= Masaka–Mbarara Water Supply and Sanitation Project =

Water supply and sanitation system in southwestern Uganda

- Location within Uganda
- Interactive map of Masaka–Mbarara Water Supply and Sanitation Project
- Location: Kagera River, Isingiro District
- Coordinates: 01°00′11″S 30°44′32″E
- Cost: €180 million ($200 million)
- Technology: Sedimentation, Chlorination
- Percent of water supply: Approximately 500,000 people in each of the cities of Masaka and Mbarara in 2030.
- Operation date: 31 December 2024 Expected

Masaka–Mbarara Water Supply and Sanitation Project (MMWSSP) is a water intake, purification, distribution and waste water collection and disposal system in the cities of Masaka and Mbarara in the Central Region and the Western Region of Uganda. The project is intended to meet the water supply and sanitation needs of approximately 1,055,000 by 2030. The work is to be carried out by the Uganda Ministry of Water and Environment through the parastatal utility company, National Water and Sewerage Corporation (NWSC). Funding (loan and grants) has been provided by the French Development Agency and the European Union.

== Location ==
The water treatment plant would be located in Western Uganda's Isingiro District, whose capital town of Isingiro, is located approximately 42 kilometres (26 mi) southeast of the city of Mbarara, the largest urban centre in Western Uganda. Isingiro is located approximately 307 kilometres (191 mi), by road, southwest of Kampala, the capital city of Uganda.

== Overview ==
The Government of Uganda (GoU) is in the process of improving the water supply and sewerage systems in three urban centres in south-western Uganda; namely Masaka, Mbarara and Isingiro. The improvements will also benefit the peri-urban areas around the three cities and over 40 small urban centres in the three districts. The GoU is working through Uganda's Ministry of Water and Environment, in collaboration with National Water and Sewerage Corporation (NWSC), the government-owned water and sanitation company. Funding is sourced through loans and grants from Agence française de développement (AFD) and the European Union.

The water intake point will be from the Kagera River that forms the southern border of Isingiro District and simultaneously the international border between Uganda and neighboring Tanzania. The raw water will be pumped to a location where a new water purification plant will be constructed. The treated potable water will then be distributed to (a) Masaka City and environs (b) Mbarara City and environs and (c) Isingiro City and surrounding rural communities.

This project is affiliated with another ongoing government undertaking by the same ministry; the Isingiro Water Supply and Sanitation Project. The Kagera River will serve as the raw water source for the city of Isingiro as well. This project will also be executed by NWSC, also with funding from the AFD.

== Other considerations ==
In Mbarara City, GoU is collaborating with RSK Uganda, a subsidiary of the RSK Group, an environmental engineering and services conglomerate, based in the United Kingdom. The detailed scope of work in Mbarara has the following components:

- The rehabilitation of Ruharo Water Treatment Plant from 8,000 cubic meters per day (8,000,000 L/d) to 12,000 cubic meters per day (12,000,000 L/d)
- Expansion and upgrading of the transmission pipeline mains of 13 kilometres (8 mi) in 2021 and a distribution mains pipeline of 27 kilometres (17 mi) in 2021
- Expansion and upgrading of the existing sewer network of 8 kilometres (5 mi) in 2021
- Rehabilitation of waste stabilization ponds in the areas of Katete, Kakoba and Kizungu
- Construction of a faecal sludge treatment centre with a treatment capacity of 50 cubic metres per day (1,800 cu ft/d)

== Construction ==
In October 2022, the engineering, procurement and construction (EPC) contract was awarded to Sogea-Satom, a subsidiary of the French group Vinci SA. Work includes the construction of a new raw water intake on the Kagera River, the construction of a new water treatment plant with capacity of 30,000 cubic meters (30,000,000 L) every 24 hours. Other infrastructure developments include the construction of a suppression station, and the laying of 62 kilometres (39 mi) of new pipes to distribute the potable water to an estimated 200,000 customers. An estimated 200 new staff are expected to be hired for the work, which is expected to take about two years. The contact price is €73 million, borrowed from the French Development Agency (AFD).

== Developments ==
In January 2023, NWSC acquired a new prefabricated water pumping station capable of pumping 160,000 cubic meters (160,000,000 L) per hour. The pump was installed to pump water from Lake Nalubaale to the Nabajjuzi water treatment plant in Masaka City. The purified water is stored in four reservoirs located at Boma, Bwala Hill, Kitovu and Kyabakuza. The new pumping station complements two other stations with pumping capacity of 230,000 cubic meters (230,000,000 L) of water per hour. The three stations produce a total of 390,000 cubic meters (390,000,000 L) every hour equivalent to 9,360,000 cubic meters (9.36×10^{9} L) every 24 hours.

== Other considerations ==
As of January 2023, Uganda's population was estimated at 49 million people. Of these, an estimated 7 million (14.3 percent) did not have access to potable drinking water. This project is part of the country's efforts to have a universal clean water supply by 2030.

== See also ==
- Ministry of Water and Environment (Uganda)
- Busia Water Supply and Sanitation Project
- Gulu Water Supply and Sanitation Project
