= Isingiro Water Supply and Sanitation Project =

Water supply and sanitation system in southwestern Uganda

- Location within Uganda
- Interactive map of Isingiro Water Supply and Sanitation Project
- Location: Kagera River, Isingiro District
- Coordinates: 01°00′11″S 30°44′32″E
- Cost: €79.5 million (US$92.6 million)
- Technology: Sedimentation, Chlorination
- Percent of water supply: 100% of Nakivale & Oruchinga Refugee Camps and Surrounding Communities in Isingiro District
- Operation date: 1 July 2024 Expected

Isingiro Water Supply and Sanitation Project (IWSSP), also Isingiro Water Supply and Sewerage System is a water intake, purification, distribution and waste water collection and disposal system in Isingiro District, in the Western Region of Uganda. The project is intended to meet the water supply and sanitation needs of 340,000 people (61.8 percent) of the 550,000 inhabitants of the district. The beneficiaries include the 100,000 occupants of Nakivale Refugee Settlement and the 32,000 occupants of Oruchinga Refugee Settlement. The work is to be carried out by the Uganda Ministry of Water and Environment through the parastatal utility company, National Water and Sewerage Corporation (NWSC). Funding (loan and grants), have been provided by the French Development Agency and the European Union.

== Location ==
The water treatment plant would be located in Western Uganda's Isingiro District, whose capital town of Isingiro, is located approximately 42 kilometres (26 mi), southeast of the city of Mbarara, the largest urban centre in Western Uganda. Isingiro is located approximately 307 kilometres (191 mi), by road, southwest of Kampala, the capital city of Uganda.

== Overview ==
In 2021 the Government of Uganda borrowed funds from the Agence française de développement (AFD) to establish the Isingiro District Water Supply and Sanitation Project, in Western Uganda. The main objective is to improve water supply and sanitation services in the district and specifically, to two refugee camps in the district, with intake capacities of 100,000 people and 32,000 people respectively, for a total of 132,000 refugees. Another 208,000 non-refugee inhabitants will also benefit, out of a total district population of 550,000.

The water intake point will be from the Kagera River that forms the southern border of Isingiro District and simultaneously the international border between Uganda and neighboring Tanzania. The raw water will be pumped to a location where a new water purification plant will be constructed. The treated potable water will then be distributed to the two refuge camps and to the rural and urban communities in Isingiro District.

This project is affiliated with another ongoing government undertaking by the same ministry; the Masaka–Mbarara Water Supply and Sanitation Project. The Kagera River will serve as the raw water source for the city of Mbarara as well. This second project will also be executed by NWSC, also with funding from the AFD.

Other planned infrastructure developments include the construction of sanitary systems in the two refugee settlements and in several urban centres in Isingiro District.

== Funding ==
The table below outlines he sources of funding for this project.

Sources of Funding for Isingiro Water Supply and Sanitation Project
Rank	Development Partner	Contribution in Euros	Percentage	Notes
1	Agence Française de Développement (AFD)	69.0 million	86.8	Loan
2	European Union	8.0 million	10.1	Grant
3	Agence Française de Développement	2.5 million	3.1	Grant
	Total	79.5 million	100.00	

The grant of €8 million by the European Union is specifically intended to be used to establish a sanitary system in the two refugee camps of Nakivale and Oruchinga.

In August 2022, the French Development Agency and the government of Uganda signed documents for loans amounting to €153 million (approx. USh604.8 billion), related to this and other water and sanitation projects in the districts of Gulu, Kyankwanzi, Kalungu and Bushenyi. The design calls for 700,000,000 liters (700,000 m^{3}) of water extracted from the Kagera River to supply Isingiro District and Mbarara City every day.

== Other considerations ==
This project is expected to reduce the waste water discharged into Lake Nakivale and also reduce the quantity of water extracted from the same lake.

== See also ==
- Ministry of Water and Environment (Uganda)
- Busia Water Supply and Sanitation Project
- Gulu Water Supply and Sanitation Project
