= Pavapuri =

Pavapuri may refer to:

- Pawapuri, a Jain pilgrimage in Nalanda, Bihar
- Shree Pavapuri Tirth Dham, a Jain pilgrimage in Rajasthan
