= Busia Water Supply and Sanitation Project =

Ugandan water supply and sanitation project

- Location within Uganda
- Interactive map of Busia Water Supply and Sanitation Project
- Location: Majanji, Busia District
- Coordinates: 00°14′37″N 33°59′17″E
- Estimated output: 12,988 cubic meters (12,988,000 L) of water daily
- Cost: US$14.2 million
- Technology: Sedimentation, Chlorination
- Percent of water supply: 100% of Busia (Uganda) Metropolitan Area & 30% of Busia District
- Operation date: 1 July 2027 Expected

Busia Water Supply and Sanitation Project (BWSSP), also Busia Water Supply and Sewerage System is a water intake, purification, distribution and waste water collection and disposal system in Busia District, Uganda.

== Location ==
The water treatment and waste water disposal facility is under construction in the lakeside town of Majanji, Majanji Parish, Majanji Sub-County, in Busia District, approximately 28 kilometres (17 mi), by road, south of the town of Busia, where the district headquarters are located. Majanji is located approximately 187 kilometres (116 mi), by road, east of Kampala, the capital city of Uganda. The geographical coordinates of the water treatment plant are: 00°14'37.0"N, 33°59'17.0"E (Latitude:0.243611; Longitude:33.988056).

== Overview ==
In the late 2020 the Government of Uganda borrowed funds from the World Bank to establish the Busia District Water Supply and Sanitation Project, in Eastern Uganda. The main objective is to improve water supply and sanitation services in the town of Busia, Uganda and to about one third of the surrounding rural district.

The water intake point will be in Lake Victoria, about 300 metres (984 ft) off the coast, in the town of Majanji. The water treatment plant, capable of processing 12,988 cubic meters (12,988,000 L) of water very 24 hours will be constructed in Majanji as well. An elevated storage tank capable of storing 1,720 cubic meters (1,720,000 L) of potable water will be erected at Dabani, between Majanji and downtown Busia.

The central collection point of the waste water will be established in the neighborhood called Osapir, within Busia Municipality, on land that is already owned by the town council. The waste water will first be passed through artificial wetland filters to separate the liquids from the solids. The liquids will then be directed into natural wetlands. The biosolids will be dried and either sold or donated to farmers to use as fertilizer.

Other planned infrastructure developments include the construction of eight flushing public toilets in downtown Busia, Uganda to cut down on open defecation and reduce water borne diseases, including Cholera, typhoid and dysentery, which are now prevalent.

== Construction and funding ==
In April 2021, the Uganda Ministry of Water and Environment, which is the implementing agency, awarded the engineering, procurement and construction (EPC) contract to Zhonghao Overseas Construction Engineering Company. The contract price is quoted as USh50 billion (approx. US$14 million). Construction is expected to last 6 years.

== Other considerations ==
Part of the water extracted from Lake Victoria under this project is intended to supply irrigation water to several agro-processing businesses in Busia District.

== See also ==
- Ministry of Water and Environment (Uganda)
- Gulu Water Supply and Sanitation Project
- Isingiro Water Supply and Sanitation Project
- Rukungiri Water Supply and Sanitation Project
