= Samuel Mwandha =

Samuel John Mwandha
- Citizenship: Ugandan
- Education: Makerere University
- Occupation: Conservationist
- Known for: Former Executive Director of the Uganda Wildlife Authority
- Awards: Diamond Jubilee Medal (Uganda) (2023)

Samuel John Mwandha also known as Sam Mwandha, is a Ugandan conservationist and former executive director of the Uganda Wildlife Authority (UWA.

== Education ==
Mwandha attended Jinja College for his O-Level education and Namilyango College for his A-Level education. He then joined Makerere University, where he pursued a degree in forestry.

== Career ==
Mwandha began his career as a teacher at Nkuutu Memorial Secondary School in Busoga, where he taught mathematics and physics for three years. He then joined Busoga Diocese as an extension worker in community forestry. In 1994, he joined Uganda National Parks, where he worked on the rehabilitation of Mount Elgon National Park following its gazettement. His conservation work later extended to Kibale National Park.

He served as Director of Conservation at the Uganda Wildlife Authority (UWA) from September 2005 to October 2010. From 2011 to 2012, he served as Executive Secretary of the Greater Virunga Transboundary Collaboration (GVTC), where he coordinated conservation efforts among Uganda, Rwanda and the Democratic Republic of the Congo.

In 2013, Mwandha joined the African Wildlife Foundation (AWF), where he worked as a Senior Conservation Planner before becoming Country Director for Uganda. He returned to the Uganda Wildlife Authority in 2018 after being appointed executive director, succeeding Andrew Seguya. He officially assumed office on 26 March 2018 and served in the position until 2025.

== Awards and honors ==
In 2025, Mwandha received a certificate of recognition from the Ministry of Tourism, Wildlife and Antiquities for his service to wildlife conservation. He was also honoured by the Uganda Wildlife Authority at his retirement. In 2023, he received the Diamond Jubilee Medal as part of Uganda's national honours.

== See also ==
- Tom Okurut
- Frank Muramuzi
- James Musinguzi
- Ministry of Water and Environment
