= Rukungiri Water Supply and Sanitation Project =

Water and sanitation system in Uganda

- Location within Uganda
- Interactive map of Rukungiri Water Supply and Sanitation Project
- Location: Rukungiri, Rukungiri District, Western Uganda
- Coordinates: 00°51′10″S 29°59′08″E
- Estimated output: 9,600 cubic meters (9,600,000 L) of water daily
- Cost: US$12 million (USh44 billion) (Phase I & II)
- Technology: Sedimentation, chlorination

Rukungiri Water Supply and Sanitation Project (RWSSP), also Rukungiri Water Supply and Sewerage System, is a water intake, purification, distribution and waste water collection and disposal system in the town of Rukungiri, in the Western Region of Uganda. When completed, the system is expected to supply 9,600 cubic meters (9,600,000 L) of water daily, to about 120,000 people in the town of Rukungiri and neighboring communities in Rukungiri District and to parts of Ntungamo District. The infrastructure development project is jointly funded by the World Bank and the Government of Uganda.

== Location ==
The new water treatment plant is located at Kabingo Village, Kebisoni Sub-county, in Rukungiri District. Kebisoni is located about 12 kilometres (7 mi), southeast of downtown Rukungiri Town.

== History ==
In 2016, the World Bank and the Government of Uganda contracted the Indian company Technofab Engineering, to implement this project. However, as of March 2021, over five years since the contract was awarded, only an estimated 35 percent of work was completed, on a project that was planned to last two years. In March 2021, the contract with the Indian contractor was terminated and National Water and Sewerage Corporation, was assigned the responsibility to complete the project.

== Overview ==
As part of efforts to supply adequate potable water to Rukungiri District, the government of Uganda, together with other development partners, devised the Rukungiri Water Supply and Sanitation Project. It is divided into two phases, Phase I and Phase II. The total budgeted cost of both phases is USh44 billion (approx. US$12 million).

=== Phase 1 ===
Phase 1 involves the construction of new intake of raw water at the Kahengye River, with a pumping station. The raw water is to be pumped to a new water treatment plant at Kabingo Village, Kebisoni Sub-county. A new reservoir with capacity of 700 cubic meters (700,000 L) will be constructed at Mukazi Hill. A new administration building, a power generator and an electromechanical house will built. Nearly 40 kilometres (25 mi) of distribution potable water mains will be laid.

=== Phase 2 ===
Phase II improvements include the construction of five reservoirs as illustrated in the table below. It also involves the construction of a waste lagoon and laying of 20 kilometres (12 mi) of potable water distribution mains. NWSC plans to build public toilets in Rukungiri town, to ease sewerage needs in the urban centre.

Rukungiri Water and Sanitation Project: Phase II components
Rank	Reservoir location	Capacity	Notes
1	Rwanyakashesha	1,000 cubic meters (1,000,000 L)	
2	Bwoma	300 cubic meters (300,000 L)	
3	Buyanja	400 cubic meters (400,000 L)	
4	Kebisoni	200 cubic meters (200,000 L)	
4	Rwerere	100 cubic meters (100,000 L)	

== Other considerations ==
Following completion of Phase II, the entire system is designed to supply 9,600 cubic meters (9,600,000 L) of clean water daily. The population in Rukungiri District has need of potable water estimated at 3,000 cubic meters (3,000,000 L) daily. Before this project they were getting only 600 cubic meters (600,000 L) a day. The project is reported to cost USh$44 billion (approx. US$12 million).

== Completion ==
On 24 November 2022, the completed water supply and sanitation project was handed over to the Ugandan Ministry of Water and Environment by Engineer Silver Mugisha, the CEO of National Water and Sewerage Corporation (NWSC). NWSC served as the general contractor for this project. The water and sanitation parastatal was also selected to serve as the operations and maintenance contractor. The project is expected to serve an estimated 163,000 people in Rukungiri Town, parts of Rukungiri District and parts of Ntungamo District, at least until 2040.

== See also ==
- Ministry of Water and Environment (Uganda)
- Busia Water Supply and Sanitation Project
- Gulu Water Supply and Sanitation Project
