= James Musinguzi =

Ugandan environmental rights activist (born 1977)

- Born: 1977 (age 48–49); Kyegegwa District, Uganda
- Occupation: Environmentalism
- Known for: Environmental rights activist
- Awards: Wildlife Conservation Education Award (2024)

James Musinguzi (born 27 July 1977) is a Ugandan environmentalist and the Executive Director of the Uganda Wildlife Authority (UWA).

== Early life and Educational background ==
James Musinguzi was born on 27 July 1977 to Mr. and Ms. Phillip Kabonesa, who originate from Kyaaka County, Kyegegwa District, though the family later settled in Kabiri Gango, Masajja, Kampala. He began his primary education at Kibiri Day and Boarding Primary School in Masajja, where he served as Head Prefect and best student after achieving four aggregates in the Primary Leaving Examination (PLE).

Musinguzi began his secondary education at Kako Senior Secondary School in Masaka District, where he served as Deputy Head Prefect. He then continued his A-level studies at Kibuli Secondary School and Kyambogo College School.

He received a scholarship to study at Mbarara University of Science and Technology, where he pursued a Bachelor of Science with Education degree, majoring in Chemistry and Biology. During his time at the university, he became actively involved in student leadership, first serving as the Guild Representative Councillor for Block D, then as Guild Secretary. In 2000, he was elected Guild President.

After completing his degree, Musinguzi was appointed as an administrator and later became an assistant lecturer in the Faculty of Science. During this period, he enrolled for a Master’s degree in Conservation Biology, a program he successfully completed in 2004. He later went on to earn a Doctor of Philosophy (PhD) in Wildlife Management.

== Career in Wildlife Conservation ==
Musinguzi joined UWEC in 2006 as an Education Officer, rose to Manager of Education and Information, then became Acting Executive Director around 2013, and was later confirmed as the substantive Executive Director of the Uganda Wildlife Conservation Education Centre (UWEC).

In 2016, Musinguzi was re‑elected to the Executive Committee of the African Association of Zoos and Aquaria at the last PAAZA conference held in South Africa.

In October 2024, the Uganda Wildlife Conservation Education Centre was merged with the Uganda Wildlife Authority (UWA) to enhance wildlife conservation efforts in the country. Following the merger, Musinguzi shifted to UWA as the Director of Community Conservation and Ex-situ Wildlife Services. On April 1, 2025, Musinguzi officially assumed office as the Executive Director of the Uganda Wildlife Authority, succeeding Sam Mwandha.

== Achievements and awards ==
In 2024, Musinguzi received the “Wildlife Conservation Education Award” at a national conservation‑event ceremony.

Under his leadership, the Uganda Wildlife Education Centre was ranked as the best in the East and Central Africa by the Pan-African Zoo Association.

UWEC, under Musinguzi leadership was awarded the World Association of Zoos and Aquaria (Waza) Award.

== See also ==
- Hilda Flavia Nakabuye
- Ndyakira Amooti
- Samuel Mwandha
