= Dabani =

- Dabani, Sirohi District
- Location within Rajasthan Location within India
- Coordinates: 24.618922°N 72.620552°E
- Country: India
- State: Rajasthan
- District: Sirohi

Government
  - Body: Dabani Gram Panchayat
- Elevation: 320 m (1,050 ft)

Population (2001)
  - Total: 1,598
- Time zone: UTC+5:30 (IST)
- Pincode(s): 307 511
- Area code: 91-XXX-XXX-XXXX
- Vehicle registration: RJ 24 (Sirohi)
- Spoken languages: Marwari Hindi, English

Dabani is a town of 1589 people about 40 km south of Sirohi, Rajasthan, India. Dabani is in Reodar Tehsil in Sirohi District of Rajasthan State, India. Dabani is located at 24.62°N 72.62°E.

Dabani has public transportation from Sirohi, Abu Road, Dantiwada, Jeerawal and Ambaji. Dabani is on NH-168 or Rajasthan SH-27 near the border of Rajasthan and Gujarat. Dabani is on the west side of Mount Abu.

== Geography ==
Dabani has rocky and rugged territory with hills in Aravalli Range. Dabani is in west of Mount Abu mountain range which is an ancient granite rock mountain.

Weather is hot and monsoon rain is not frequent. Dabani is near Devangan River which flows only during monsoon and sometime dries up in hot summer before meeting West branch of Banas river. However, there was very heavy rain in Dabani in 2017.

== Temple ==
Dabani has Chamunda Mataji Mandir, old Jain Temple and Ramdevji Mandir.

Jain new Shree Pavapuri Tirth Dham is 20 km north of Dabani and Jeerawal Parshwanath Temple is 20 km west of Dabani via Reodar.

Famous Ambaji temple in Gujarat is 60 km south of Dabani.

== See also ==
- Sirohi
- Reodar
- Abu Road
- Jeerawal
- Jirawala
- Ambaji
- Shree Pavapuri Tirth Dham
- Dilwara Temples
