= Shree Pavapuri Tirth Dham =

Śvetāmbara Jain temple in Rajasthan, India

Pavapuri Tirtha, Rajasthan
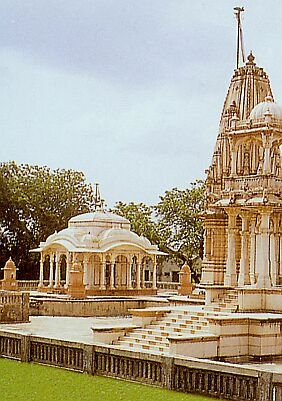

- Location within Rajasthan

Religion
- Affiliation: Jainism
- Sect: Śvetāmbara
- Deity: Parshwanath
- Festival: Mahavir Jayanti

Location
- Location: Kushalgarh, Sirohi, Rajasthan
- Coordinates: 24.750319°N 72.709816°E

Architecture
- Creator: K. P. Sanghvi Group
- Completed: 2001
- Temple: 1

Website
- www.pavapuri.com

Shree Pavapuri Tirth Dham is situated at Sirohi district of Rajasthan. This temple was built by K. P. Sanghvi Group and it comprises an important Śvetāmbara Jain Tirth (Temple complex) and Jeev Raksha Kendra (Animal Welfare Center).

== Campus ==
The Tirth derived its name after the Pavada Agriculture well that exists there.

Shri Kumarpalbhai V. Shah inspired Late Shri Hajarimalji Poonamchandji Sanghvi (Bafna) and Shri Babulalji Poonamchandji Sanghvi (Bafna), the founders of K. P. Sanghvi Group, to construct a Tirth Dham. They started construction and development of the campus on 30 May 1998, Saturday (Jeth Shukla 15, 2054 V. S.). The initial thought was to construct a small temple and a shelter for 100 cows only but the campus is now spread over more than 500 acres (2.0 km^{2}) of land. The temple complex occupies 3,101,472 sq ft (288,136.2 m^{2}) area and the Jeev Raksha Kendra (Animal Welfare Center) occupies 7,196,112 sq ft (668,540.7 m^{2}).

It took two and a half years to construct the temple with an average of 400 artisans working daily. The construction was completed on 7 February 2001, Wednesday (Magh Shukla 14, 2057 V. S.) and was finally opened for worship.

== Animal Welfare Center ==
The campus has an Animal Welfare Center that tends to stray cows, buffaloes, dogs and donkeys. Founded in 1998, the goshala covers over 7,000,000 sq ft (650,000 m^{2}) of area and houses more than 5000 stray cattle. To take care of the animals, the center also employs over 150 people and a few veterinary doctors.

== See also ==
- Jal Mandir, Pawapuri
