= Sam Cheptoris =

Ugandan politician

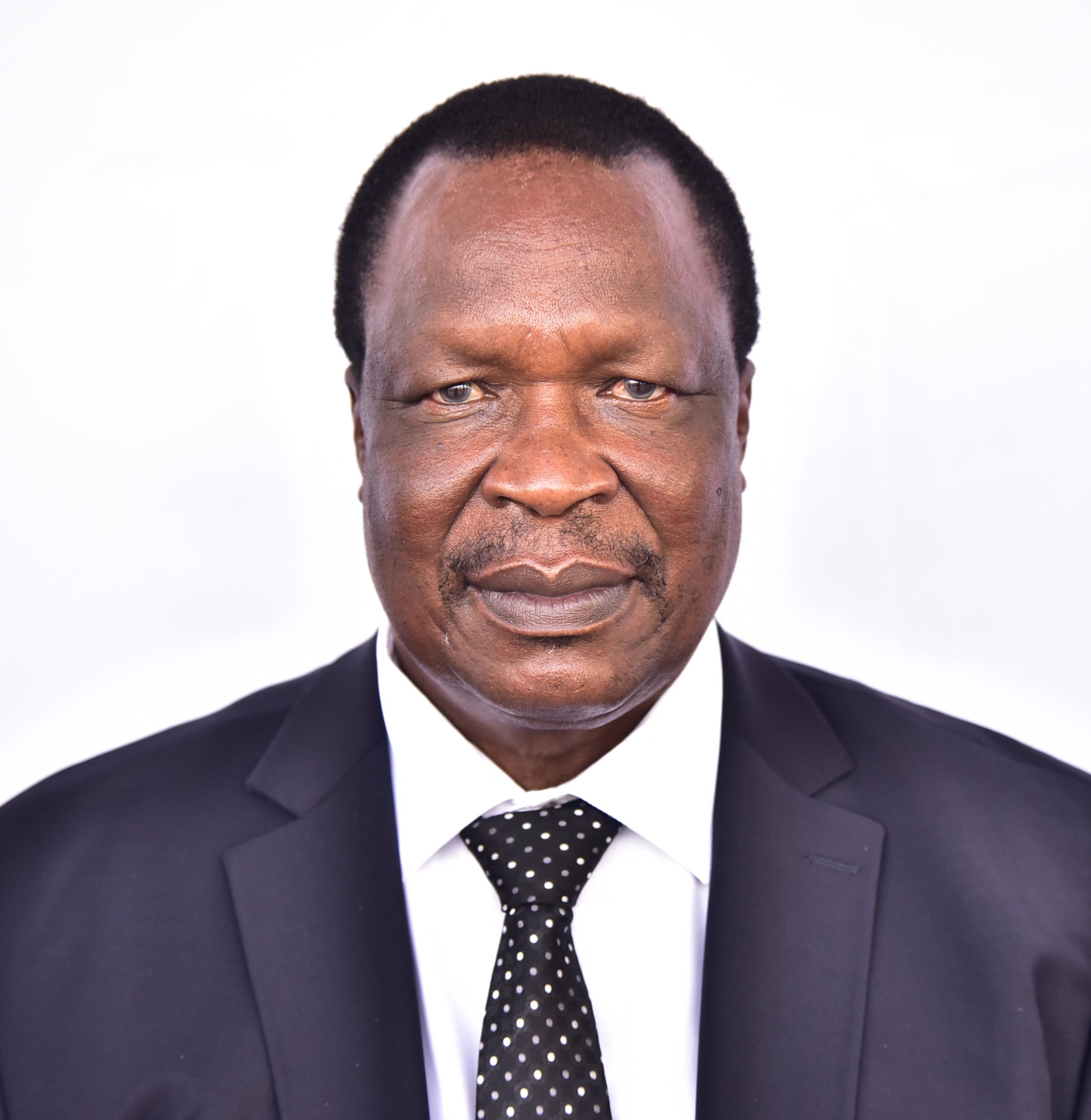
- Born: 12 December 1949 (age 76); Kapchorwa District, Uganda
- Citizenship: Uganda
- Education: University of Nairobi (Bachelor of Arts); Makerere University (Postgraduate Diploma in Education, Master of Education)
- Occupations: Educator and Politician
- Years active: 1975–present
- Known for: Politics
- Title: Cabinet Minister for Water and Environment

Sam Mangusho Cheptoris (born 12 December 1949) is a Ugandan politician. He was the Cabinet Minister of Water and Environment in the Cabinet of Uganda. He was appointed to that position on 6 June 2016. In 2021 he was elected as member of parliament for Kapchorwa Municipality.

== Early life and education ==
Sam Cheptoris was born in present-day Kapchorwa District, on 12 December 1949. He studied at Nabumali High School, before attending the University of Nairobi where he graduated with a Bachelor of Arts. Later, he studied at Makerere University, graduating first with a Postgraduate Diploma in Education and later with a Master of Education.

== Academic career ==
In 1975, after his undergraduate studies in Nairobi, Cheptoris served as a teacher of English and English Literature at Sebei College, Tegeres. Between 1978 and 1981, he served as deputy head teacher at the same school. After brief stints at Comboni College and at Gamatui Girls School, he came back to Sebei College as Headmaster in 1998. He retired from academics in 2009.

== Political career ==
In 2011 Cheptoris won the Kapchorwa District LC5 position on the National Resistance Movement political party ticket. After one five-year term, he successfully contested for the newly created Kapchorwa Municipality constituency in the Parliament of Uganda. On 6 June 2016, he was appointed as Cabinet Minister of Water and Environment. Among his priorities as a member of parliament are: (a) to establish an irrigation system in the constituency to boost agricultural production, (b) to assist in the creation of a university in the sub-region, (c) to assist in the re-establishment of "Elgon Cooperative Union", and (d) to establish a water and sewerage system in Kapchorwa Municipality.Sam retired from elective politics and did not contest in the 2026 elections in the Sebei subregion.

== Business interests ==
Cheptoris is the proprietor of (a) Kapchrowa Standard Academy, a secondary school in Kapchorwa District and (b) Cheminy Standard Academy, a secondary school in neighboring Kween District.

== See also ==
- Cabinet of Uganda
- Parliament of Uganda
