= Frank Muramuzi =

Ugandan environmentalist

- Born: 12 December 1962
- Died: 11 August 2025 (aged 62)
- Citizenship: Ugandan
- Education: Makerere International Institute of Environmental and Practical Skills; Makerere University
- Occupation: Environmentalist
- Known for: Founding director of the National Association of Professional Environmentalists

Frank Muramuzi (12 December 1962 – 11 August 2025) was a Ugandan environmentalist who served as the founding director of the National Association of Professional Environmentalists (NAPE).

He died on 11 August 2025 and is buried at his ancestral home in Mbarara.

== Education ==
Muramuzi earned his bachelor's degree in environmental education from Makerere International Institute of Environmental and Practical Skills and a diploma in adult education from Makerere University.

== Career ==
Muramuzi was one of the founding members of the African Rivers Network (ARN) and served as the East African coordinator for the Oil Watch Network, which mobilized at the Albertine Rift when Uganda began active oil extraction in 2006.

He held many roles across various environmental organizations, including co-founding and serving as the chair of membership development for Friends of the Earth, the chairperson of Ugandan chapter of the East African Communities Organizations for the Management of Lake Victoria resources (ECOVIC), board member of the Uganda Coalition for Sustainable Development (UCSD), and member of the Dams and Development Forum (DDP) of United Nations Environment Programme based in Nairobi.

Muramuzi was a vocal advocate of environmental resource management and wetland conservation who frequently pressed the government on environmental policies, including questioning the National Environment Management Authority (NEMA) about the efficiency of the national electronic waste management plan and calling on the government to terminate the business licenses of entities operating in the Ugandan wetlands.

== Achievements and awards ==
Under Muramuzi's leadership, NAPE was awarded a Human Rights award by the Uganda Human Rights Commission (UHRC) in 2013, and the Uganda Responsible Investment (URI) award for Best Environmental Protection Organisation of the Year in 2019.
