= Ndyakira Amooti =

Ugandan journalist

Sir. Ndyakira Amooti
- Born: 1955 or 1956
- Died: 25 August 1999; Kampala, Uganda
- Occupations: Journalist, children's writer
- Known for: Environmental journalism

Ndyakira Ntamuhiira Amooti (1955 or 1956 – 25 August 1999) was a Ugandan children's writer, journalist and environmentalist, awarded the Global 500 Roll of Honour and winner of the Goldman Environment Prize.

== Life and career ==
Amooti worked as a journalist for the Kampala newspaper The New Vision from 1986. He lived in a village in the Ibanda District. He reported on various environmental issues, such as endangered mountain gorillas, the forests of Bwindi, and illegal mining and poaching. He also called attention to the business of smuggling of rare animals for the purpose of exposition or laboratory experiments, in particular endangered chimpanzees and parrots. In 1993, he was awarded the Global 500 Roll of Honour of the United Nations Environment Programme. He was awarded the Goldman Environmental Prize in 1996. He later focused on forest protection and on the environment of Lake Victoria.

He published the children's book What a Country Without Animals! in 1998, and has also published the books What a Country Without Birds, What a Country Without Grasslands, and What a Country Without Wetlands. The books are about environmental issues, written for children from nine to twelve years old, and the story's principal character is the young man "Kazoora".

== Death and Legacy ==
Amooti died from leukemia in 1999, 43 years old. In accordance with his wishes, he was buried without a coffin, with his body being wrapped in a palm-leaf mat.

He is regarded as a pioneer in the awareness of environmental issues in Uganda. At the World Wetlands Day in 2008, Amooti was honored with a memorial lecture.

== Selected works ==
Children's books

- What a Country Without Animals
- What a Country Without Birds
- What a Country Without Grasslands
- What a Country Without Wetlands
