= Gulu Water Supply and Sanitation Project =

Water and sanitation system in Uganda

- Location within Uganda
- Interactive map of Gulu Water Supply and Sanitation Project
- Location: Gulu City, Northern Uganda
- Coordinates: 02°49′24″N 32°16′09″E
- Estimated output: 15,000,000 liters (15,000 m^{3}) of water daily
- Cost: US$75 million (UGX:269 billion) (Phase I & II)
- Technology: Sedimentation, Chlorination

Gulu Water Supply and Sanitation Project (GWSSP), also Gulu Water Supply and Sewerage System, is a water intake, purification, distribution and waste water collection and disposal system in the city of Gulu, the largest urban centre in the Northern Region of Uganda. In October 2020, the Uganda government concluded Phase 1 of the improvement of water supply and sanitation in the city, with funding from the World Bank, KfW and the Government of Uganda. Phase 2 improvements are expected to start in 2021, with funding from the World Bank, KfW and the Commonwealth Development Corporation (CDC Group).

== Location ==
The water treatment facility is located in the northwestern part of the city of Gulu (pop. 177,400 (est.) in 2020), in Gulu District, in the Northern Region of Uganda, approximately 334 kilometres (208 mi) by road, north of Kampala, the country's capital and largest city.

== Overview ==
Before attaining city status, Gulu relied solely on a single dam on the Oyitino River, known as Oyitino I, as its primary water source. However, a prolonged dry spell rendered the dam inadequate to meet the demands of the expanding city and its surrounding metropolitan area.

As part of efforts to avail adequate potable water to Gulu and its metropolis, the government of Uganda, together with other development partners, devised the Gulu Water Supply And Sanitation Project. It is divided into two phases, Phase I and Phase II. The total budgeted cost of both phases is US$46 million (USh:170 billion). In March 2022, that budget was increased to $75 million (UGX:269 billion).

=== Phase 1 ===
Phase 1 was executed between 2017 and 2020. The first task was to drill a borehole adjacent to Kakanyero Hotel, which supplies 50,000 liters (50 m^{3}) per hour, translating in 1,200,000 liters (1,200 m^{3}) per day. The borehole is fitted with electric pumps that pump the new water directly to storage reservoirs in some neighborhoods in Gulu City, including (a) Senior Quarters (b) Kitgum Road and (c) Alur Road, among others. Five other "motorised boreholes" were drilled with total capacity of 2,400 cubic meters (2,400,000 L) of water per day.

The second item in Phase I is the construction of another dam on the Oyitino River (Oyitino II). New intake pipes were laid down to evacuate raw water from both dams and carry it 7 kilometres (4 mi) to the water treatment plant in the neighborhood called Kabedopong. The intake of raw water from Oyitino I and Oyitino II was synchronized and fitted with a new 400 kVA electric generator. The treatment plant was refurbished and capacity increased from 4,000,000 liters (4,000 m^{3}) per day to 10,000,000 liters (10,000 m^{3}) per day.

Another component of Phase I is the building of a new sewage treatment plant in a neighborhood of Gulu called Cubu. New sewage piping to 200 new connections expanded the waste collection and disposal system in the city. Forty-two new public toilets were constructed, capable of accommodating 250 individuals at the same time. Phase I improvements cost US$23.5 million (USh:82.3 billion).

=== Phase 2 ===
Phase II improvements started in 2021 and are expected to conclude in 2024. These involve the laying on a raw water intake pipe off the Victoria Nile in Oyam District, to a new water treatment plant in Karuma. A new water purification plant will be built in Karuma, close to the raw water intake location. A new purifies water transportation pipeline will be laid measuring approximately 75 kilometres (47 mi), between Karuma and Gulu. Each jurisdiction that the treated water pipeline traverses will share in the purified water. The new water treatment plant will have treatment capacity of 30,000 cubic meters (30,000,000 L) per day.

In February 2022, Sogea-Satom, a subsidiary of the conglomerate Vinci SA of France, signed an agreement to carry out the implementation of this phase. Under the contract signed with NWSC, the French company committed to undertake the following (a) install electromechanical equipment with capacity to pump 30,000 cubic metres (1,059,440 cu ft) of raw water per day on the Victoria Nile River, in the vicinity of Karuma (b) build a water purification plant at Karuma, that can produce 30,000m3 of potable water per day. The purification plant will have a storage reservoir "for storing drinking water".

Other commitments include (c) construction of a drying facility for the sludge at the existing wastewater treatment plant in Gulu. The drying facility will sit on an area measuring 450 square metres (4,800 sq ft) and (d) Sogea-Satom will also be responsible for the installation of all the electrical, automation and remote management equipment of the entire system.

This water infrastructure and sanitation project will benefit towns and communities along a 75 kilometres (47 mi) corridor, between Karuma and Gulu, including: Kamdini, Koro Abili, Karuma, Bobi, Palenga and Minakuru. NWSC estimates that the project will benefit nearly 490,000 people in these small urban centres. In March 2022, another €26 million (UGX:94 billion), sourced from the World Bank, Kfw and the Ugandan Treasury, was injected into the second phase of this project.

== Ownership ==
The Gulu water treatment facilities, along with the sewage treatment and disposal system, are fully owned by the Government of Uganda through the Ministry of Water and Environment. Their operation and maintenance are handled by the National Water and Sewerage Corporation, a government-owned parastatal responsible for delivering potable water and sewerage services across the country.

== See also ==
- Ministry of Water and Environment (Uganda)
- Busia Water Supply and Sanitation Project
- Rukungiri Water Supply and Sanitation Project
