= Pawapuri =

- Town
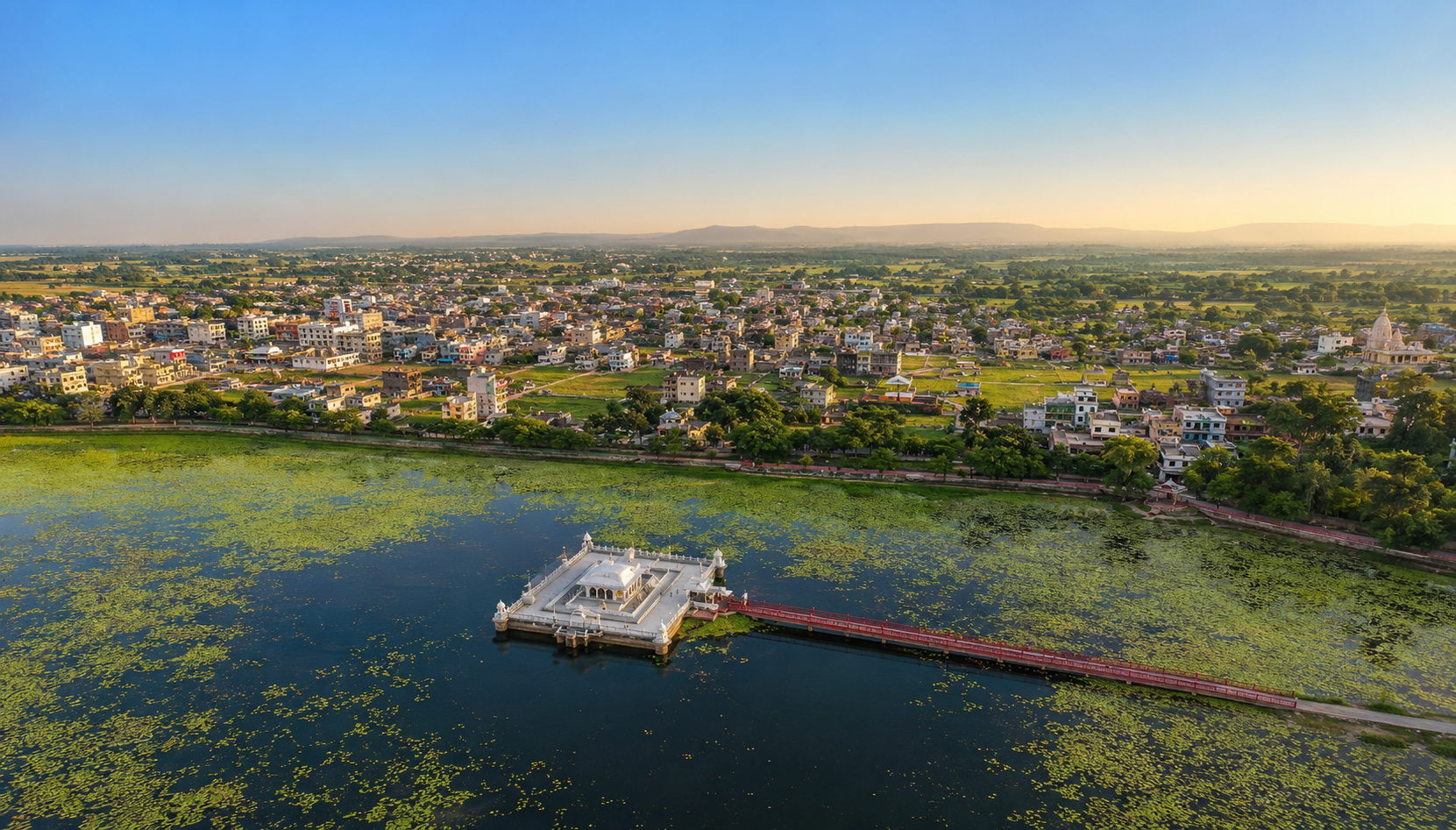
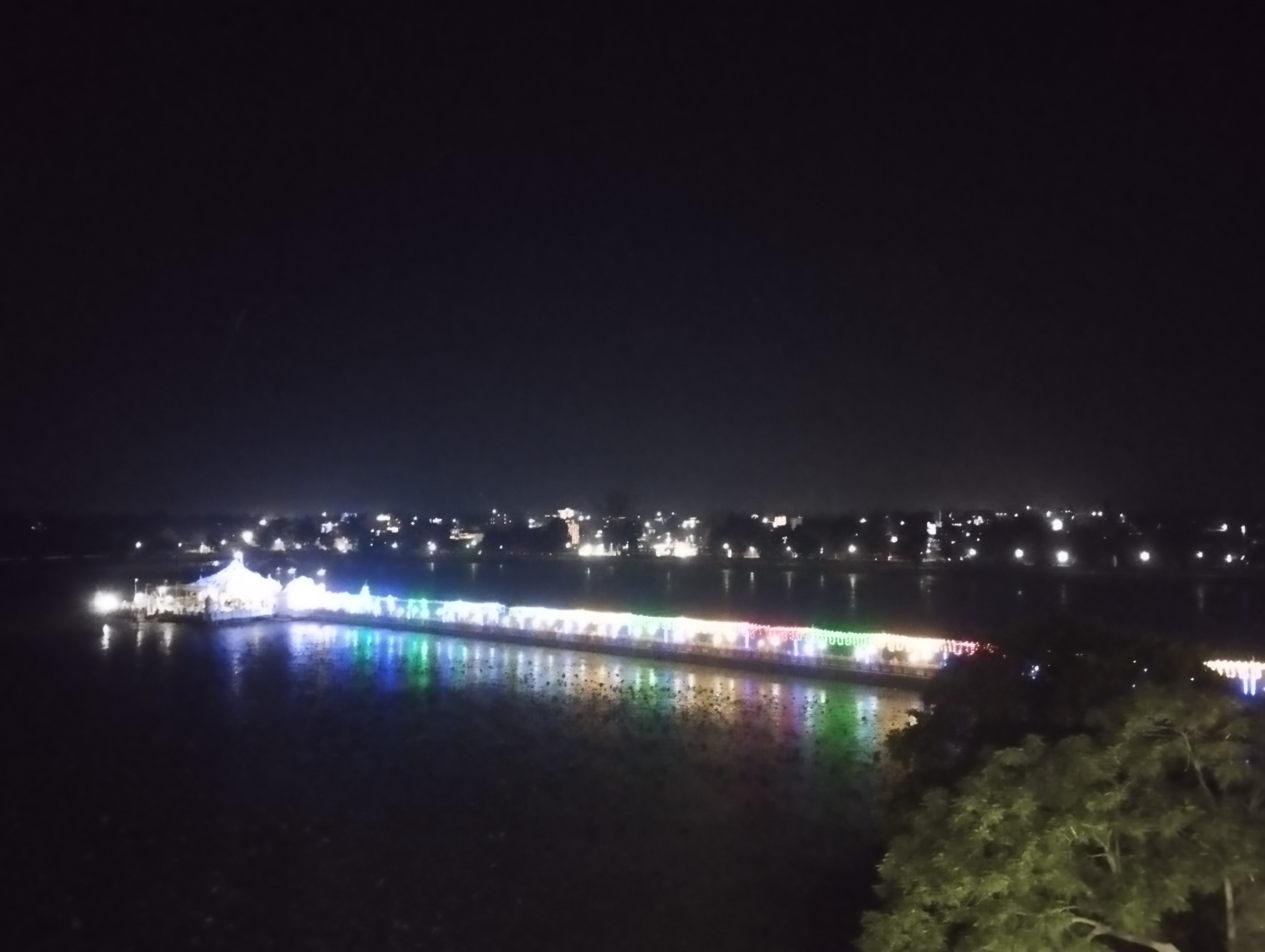
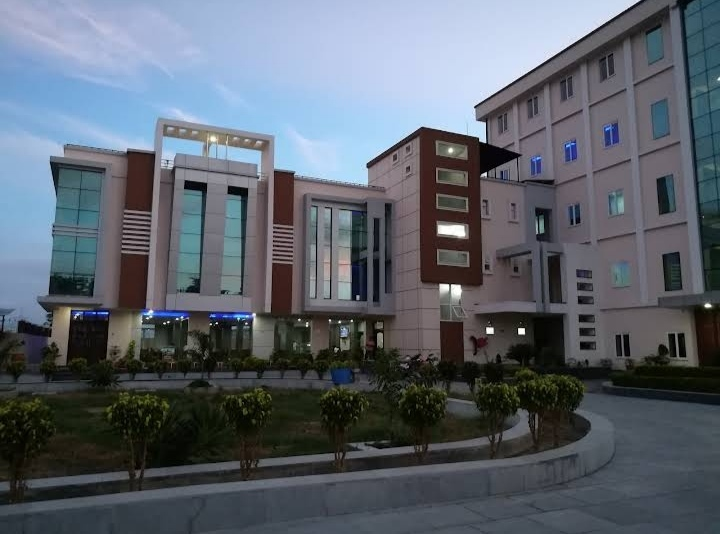
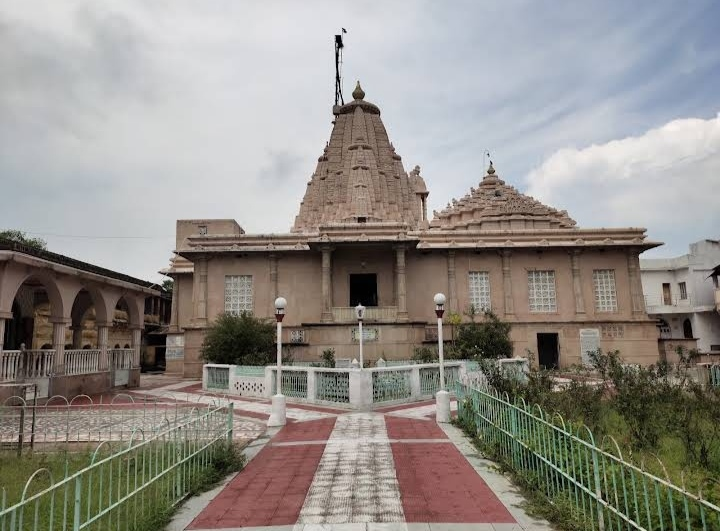
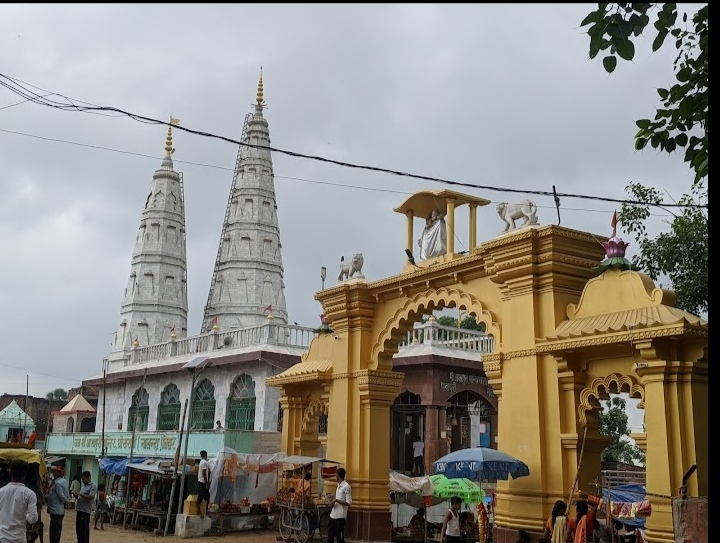
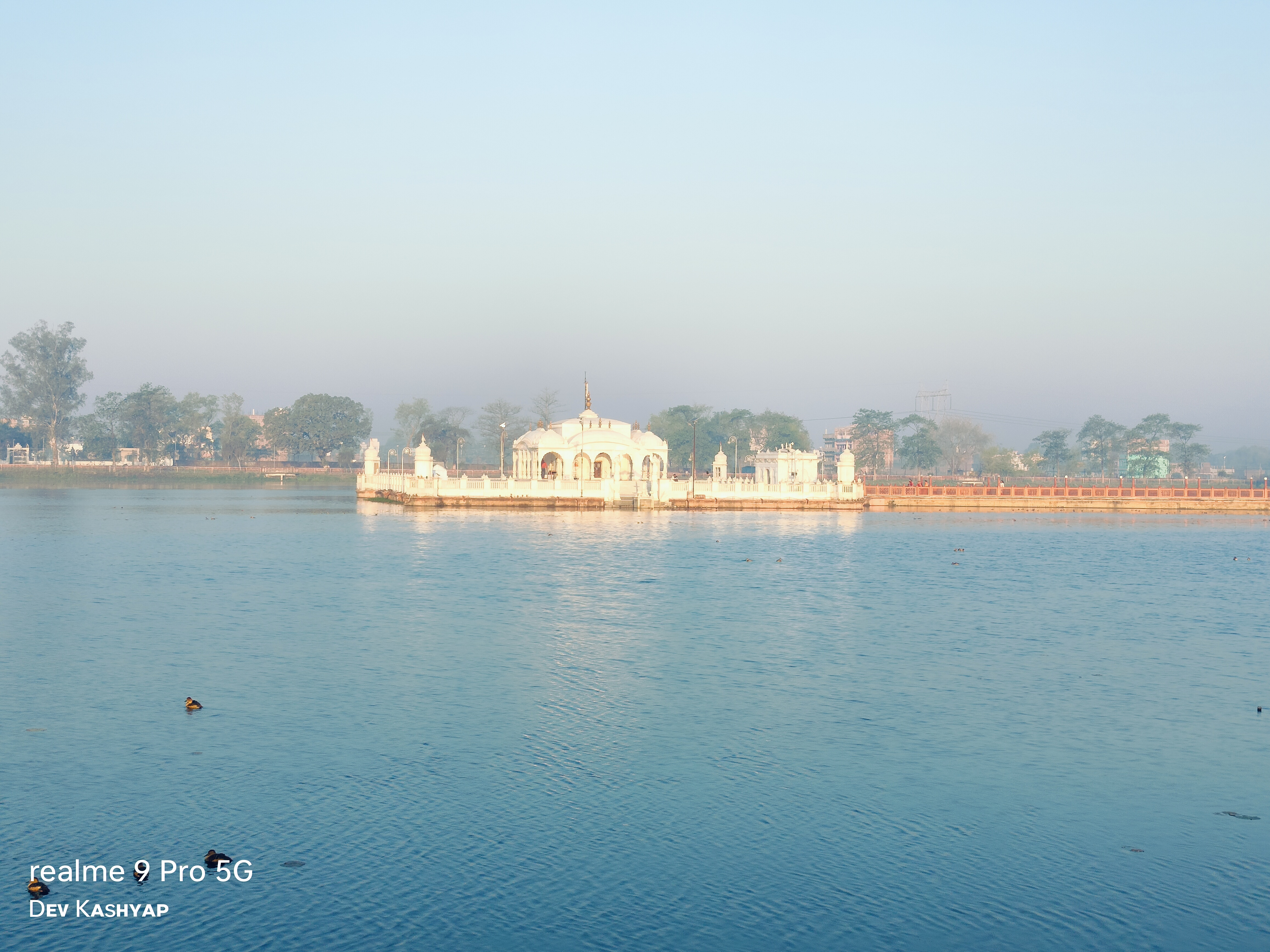
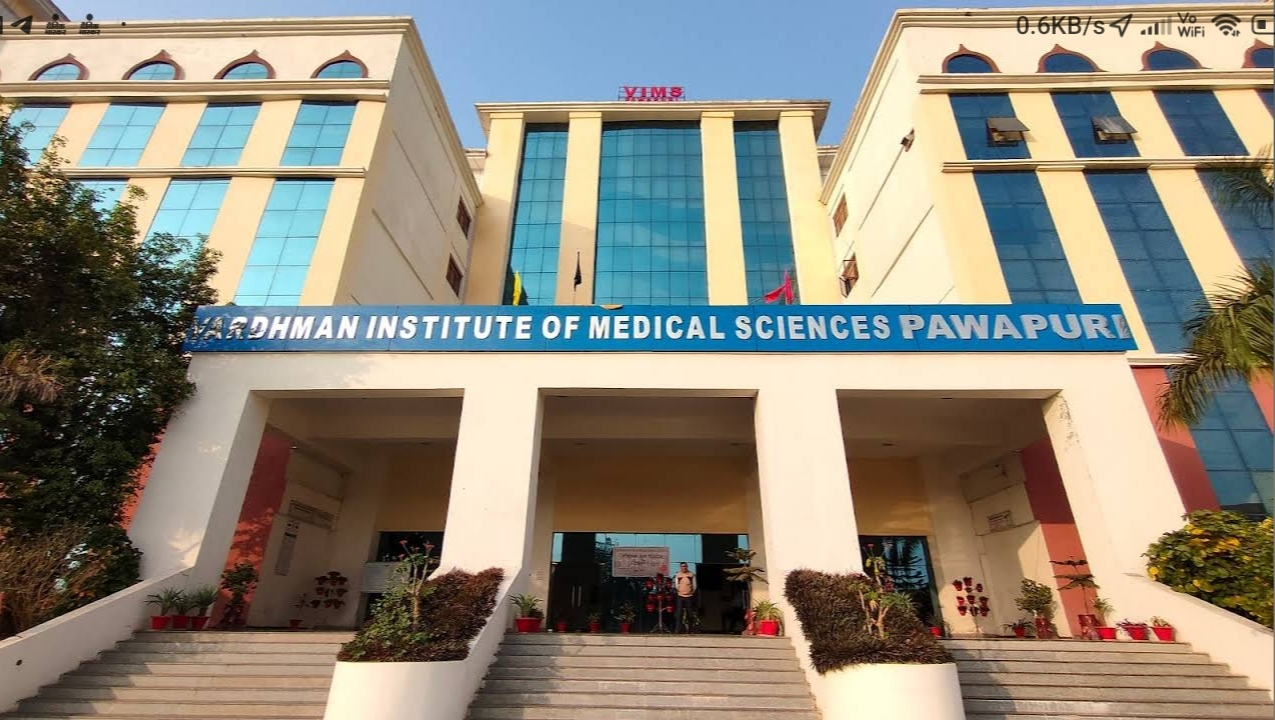
- Skyline of Pawapuri From top, left to right: Night view of Jal Mandir, Hotel Abhilasha, Gaanv Mandir, Maa Ashapuri Mandir, Jal Mandir, BMIMS Pawapuri,
- Nickname: The Town of Peace and Non-violence
- Interactive map of Pawapuri
- Country: India
- State: Bihar
- Region: Magadh
- Division: Patna
- District: Nalanda
- Nagar Panchayat: Pawapuri
- Ward: 11
- Founded: 527 BCE
- Founder: Nandivardhana

Government
  - Type: Nagar Panchayat
  - Body: Nagar Panchayat Pawapuri

Population (2011)
  - Town: 28,790
  - Urban: 13,263
- Time zone: UTC+5:30 (IST)
- PIN: 803115
- Telephone Code: +91-6112
- Vehicle registration: BR-21

Pawapuri, or Pavapuri (also called Apapapuri, meaning "the sinless town"), is a holy site for Jains located in the Nalanda district of Bihar state in eastern India. It is located about 19 kilometres from Rajgir and 101 kilometres from Patna, the capital of Bihar. Pawapuri is Mahavira's nirvana and a pilgrimage site for Jains.

== Tourism ==
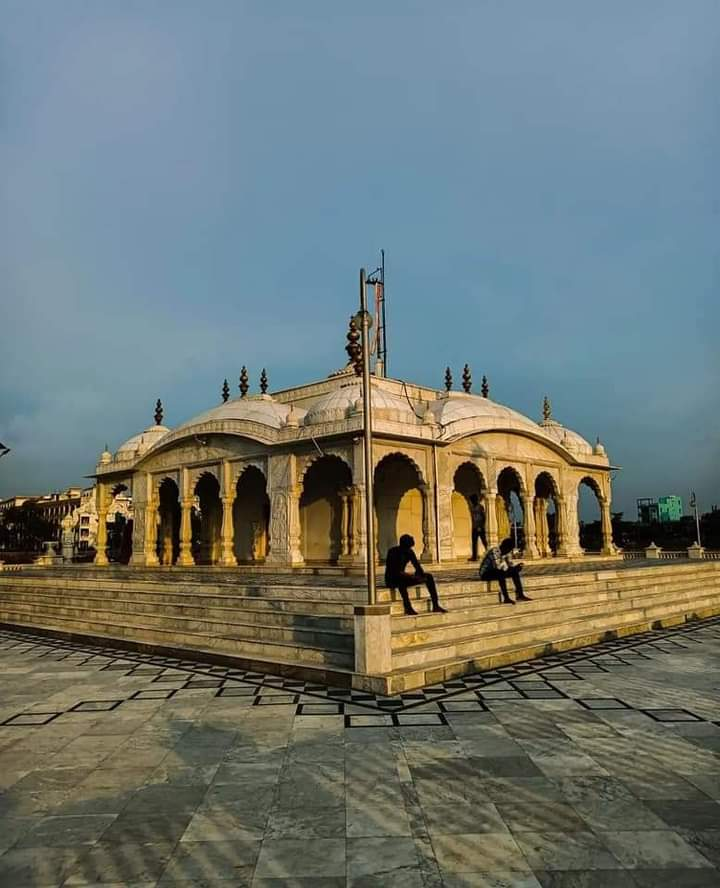
Jal Mandir In Pawapuri

Pawapuri in Nalanda district ranks second after Rajgir in Nalanda in terms of tourism. Among the main tourist attractions, the Jal Mandir (water temple) here is world-famous. It is believed that Lord Mahavira (the 24th Tirthankara of Jainism) was cremated at this place after attaining Mahanirvana. Most of the tourists come to Pawapuri in thousands to see the beauty of the water temple.

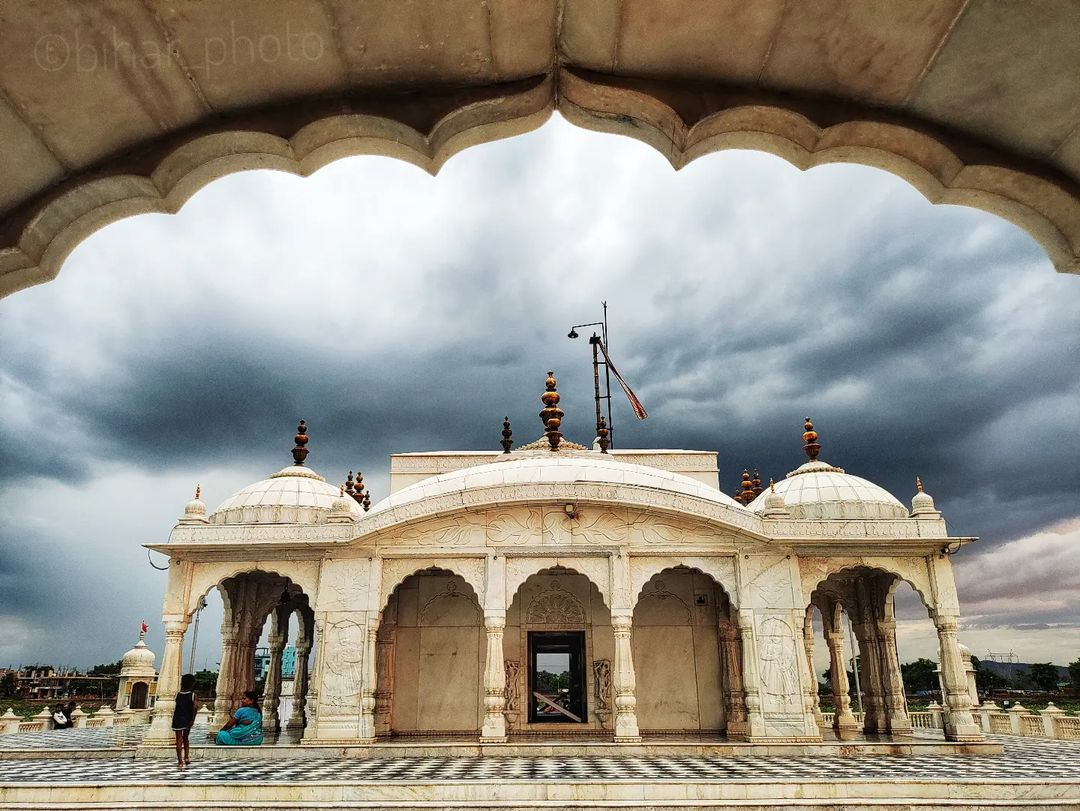
Main view of the Jal Mandir, Pawapuri

The Jal Mandir is spread over an area of 84 bighas. In summer, Lotus flowers enhance the beauty of this pond, due to which this pond is also known as Kamal Sarovar.

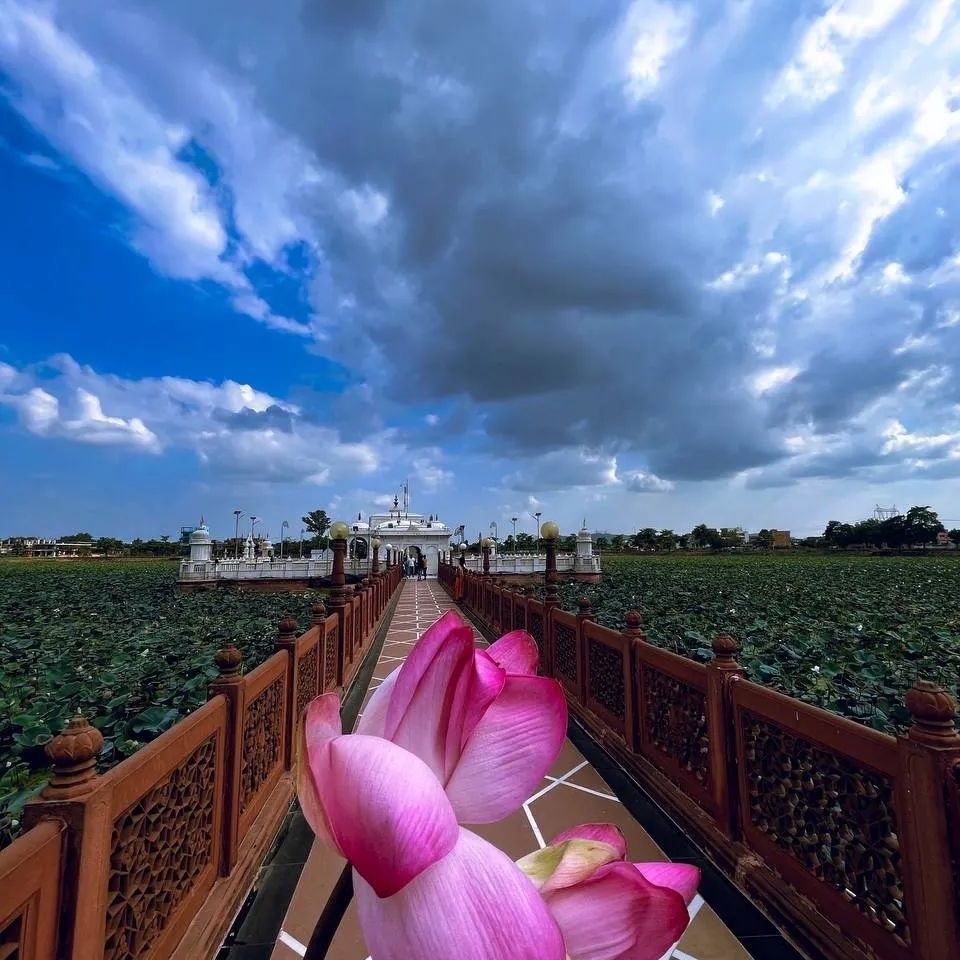
A Lotus from the Jal Mandir pond shown by an individual in front of the way to the temple

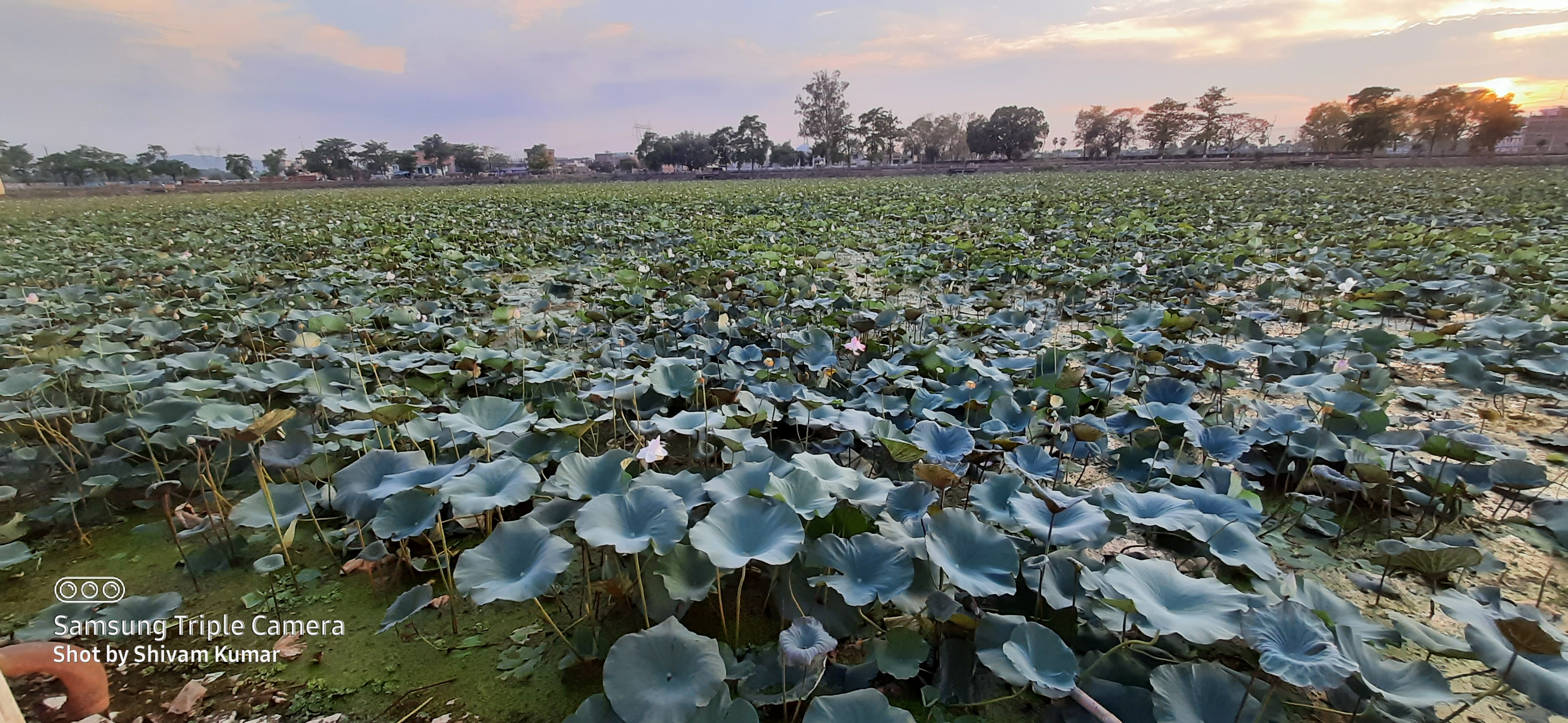
View of Lotus on Jal Mandir pond

And during winter, foreign birds come and land in this pond and make this pond more lively.

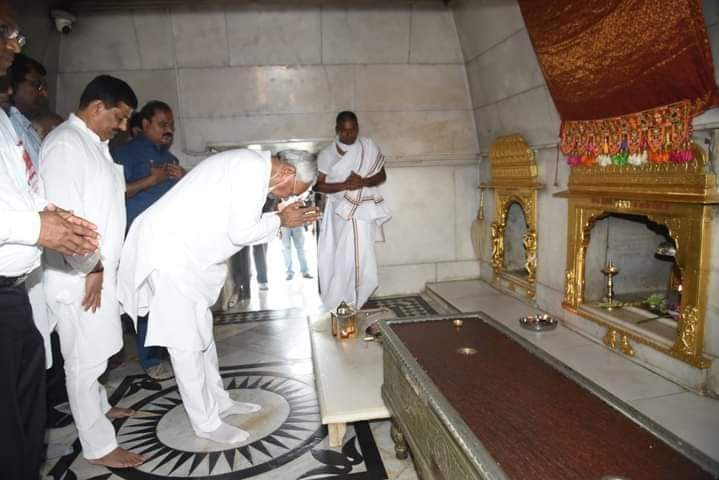
Bihar chief minister Shri Nitish Kumar offering prayers inside the Jal Mandir Pawapuri

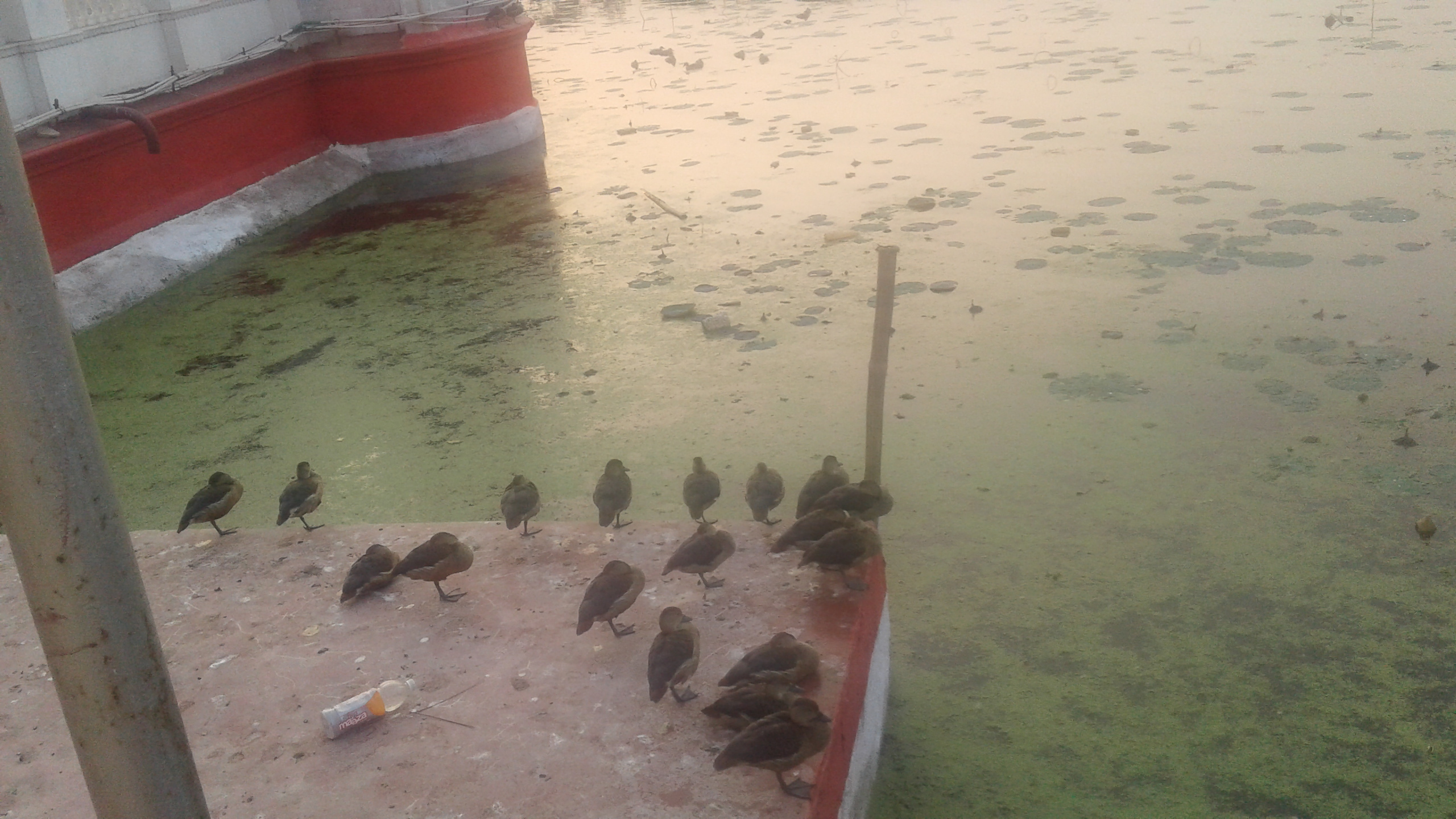
Some foreign birds resting near the water temple pond

Fish also have a different importance in this pond. Here, the tradition of wearing gold nose rings to big fish has been going on for centuries, and catching or killing fish from this pond is strictly prohibited.

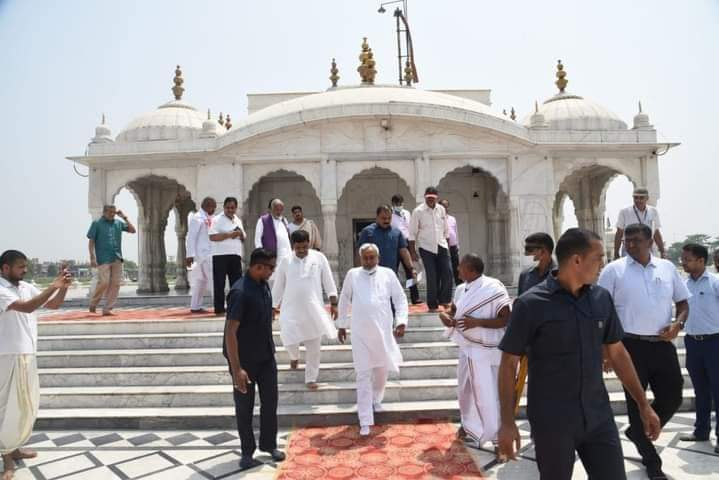
In 2022, Chief Minister of Bihar Shri Nitish Kumar along with Sanjay Kumar Jha In Jal Mandir during His visits to Pawapuri

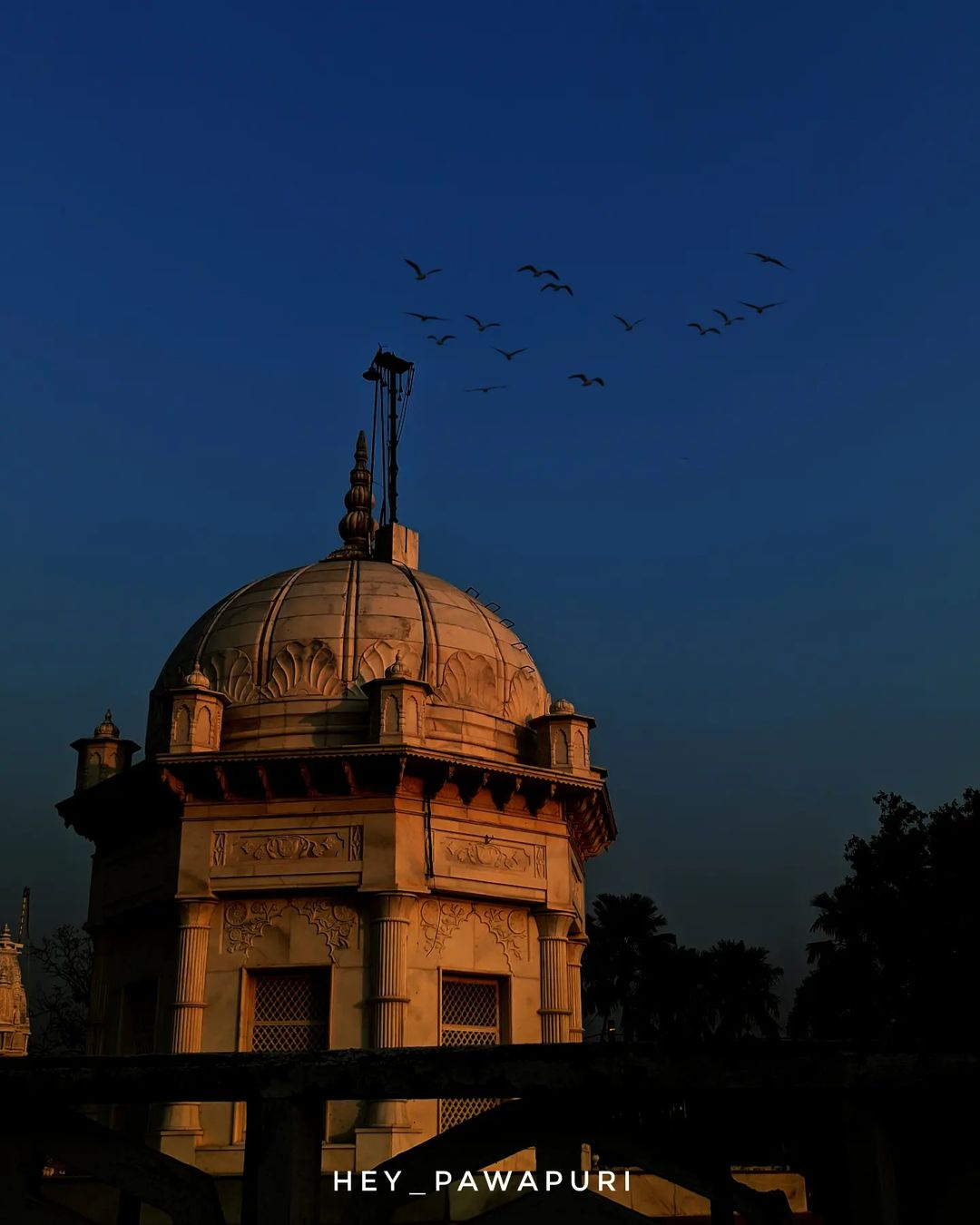
A beautiful evening view of the old Samhosharan temple in Pawapuri

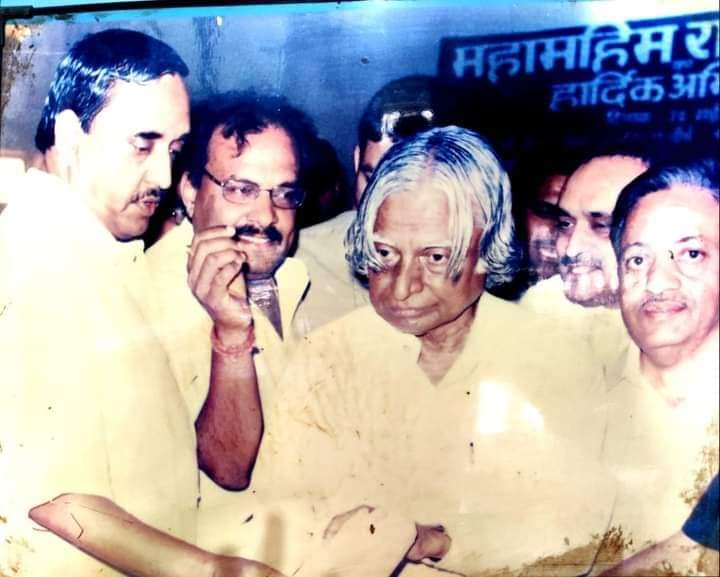
In May 2003, former President of India A.P.J Abdul Kalam lighting the lamp at the Digambar Temple in Pawapuri, along with Amartya Sen (right) and Kapildev Prasad Singh (far left)

In 2003, the President of India Dr. APJ Abdul Kalam came on a three-day visit to Bihar, when he visited the Jain temples of Pawapuri and took stock of the possible development works here. Kalam was mesmerized by the beauty of the water temple here. He also drew attention towards the development of Jain pilgrimages after returning from his Bihar visit.

Apart from the water temple, there is the old Samosaran, near the water temple. Its structure contains artifacts made by carstones and provide visitors a place to sit and reflect.

== Culture ==
Apart from the Jain temple in Pawapuri, many temples related to Hindu culture are also famous here and have their own importance. Ghosranwa village is situated at a distance of 5 kilometres from Pawapuri, which is part of the geographical area of Pawapuri. Maa Ashapuri Temple is located here, whose glory is famous from Nalanda district to entire Bihar. Thousands of devotees come here every year to visit. There is a tradition of sacrificing goats after the wishes are fulfilled, which is considered to be so in Nalanda district. The wish of every devotee who wishes here is fulfilled by Asha Maharani Completes.This 1000-year-old temple holds special significance even during Navratri. Entry of women is prohibited inside this temple for 9 days during Navratri.

=== Baba Thakur Sahdev Temple ===
This temple is located in Pokharpur village of Pawapuri and is dedicated to Baba Thakur Sahdev. This centuries-old temple also has a different significance for the local and surrounding people. It is believed that by making a wish here, Baba Thakur Sahdev will fulfil all the needs of the people. The wishes of the people living here are definitely fulfilled, but there is a special blessing of his majesty: there was a huge Peepal tree 300 to 400 years old. Due to the weak soil of its roots, the tree fell during a storm, due to which the shape of the old temple was destroyed. After which this temple was constructed, which is already grand. Near this temple, Durga temple of Pawapuri, Shiva temple, Ram Janki mandir, and Maharani Sthan are also situated, which has a special significance for the people living here.

Durga Temple and Mahavir Temple in Puri Village are also of Hindu cultural significance in Pawapuri.

== Pawapuri Mahotsav ==
It is believed that Lord Mahavira attained Mahanirvana on the night of Diwali on Kartik Amavasya, on the occasion of which Nirvana Mahotsav is organised every year in Pavapuri on the day of Kartik Amavasya on the night of Diwali.

This two-day event is organised by the Nalanda district administration and the Art, Culture, and Youth Department of the Government of Bihar. In the year 2016, on the special request of Jain followers, Bihar Chief Minister Shri Nitish Kumar announced to celebrate it as a state festival, and from the next year, 2017 onwards, it is celebrated every year as a two-day Pawapuri Mahotsav, and special fairs are organised on this occasion. which is supervised by the district administration, Nalanda, and Pawapuri Nagar panchayat administration. In this festival, along with the exhibition on the glorious history of Bihar, the life of Lord Mahavir, and the art of famous artists of the country.

== Education ==
Pawapuri is moving towards relentless development in terms of education. The Vardhman Institute of Medical Sciences is now the Bhagwan Mahavir Institute of Medical Sciences. The medical college in Pawapuri is a major centre of medical education. Medical students from all over Bihar come to study here.

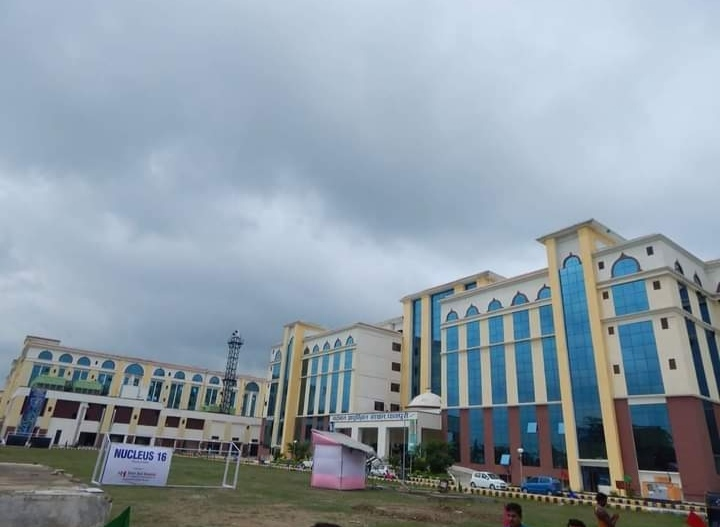
Administrative building of Vardhman Institute of Medical Sciences in Pawapuri

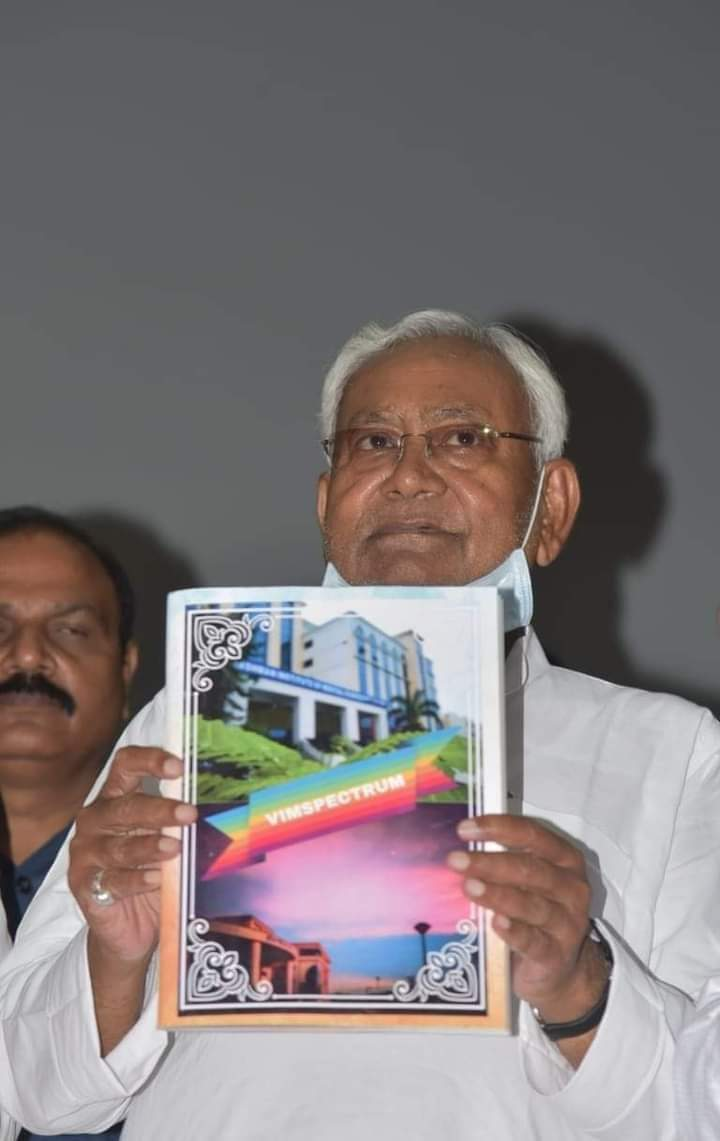
In April 2022, Bihar Chief Minister Shri Nitish Kumar Presents VIMSPECTRUM in auditorium of BMIMS During His Visits To Pawapuri

Its foundation stone was laid and inaugurated by Bihar Chief Minister Nitish Kumar in 2011. Done in 2013. Only one Sainik school in Bihar, Sainik School Nalanda, is also in Pawapuri. In 1999, former Defence Minister of India George Fernandes announced the construction of a Sainik school in Pawapuri, Nalanda. There are a total of 14 schools here, including all private and government schools for primary education, secondary education, and higher education.

- Tirthankar Mahavir Vidya Mandir, guided by Veerayatan group
- Bhagwan Mahavir Nursing College
- Open Minds - A Birla School
- Gip Public School
- Krishna Public School
- Bal Navoday Vidyalaya
- Global Public School & Kids Convent
- Mother Teresa High School
- Kerala Public School
- Gyan Deep Public School
- Congress High School
- Vardhman Mahavir College, guided by Patliputra University

== Transport ==
The city is situated at a distance of 90 kilometers from the capital city of Patna, which is connected by National Highway 20.

=== Railways ===
The nearest railway station is Pawapuri Railway Station, which connects the trains coming from Bihar's capital Patna and Rajgir. Biharsharif Railway Station is also a major railway station. The Government of India has also approved the proposal to directly connect Pawapuri Tirtha with the rail line from Nawada to Bhaya Pawapuri and Bihar Sharif to Patna.

==== Roadways ====
Pawapuri city is directly connected to National Highway 20, which connects the capital Patna to Ranchi.

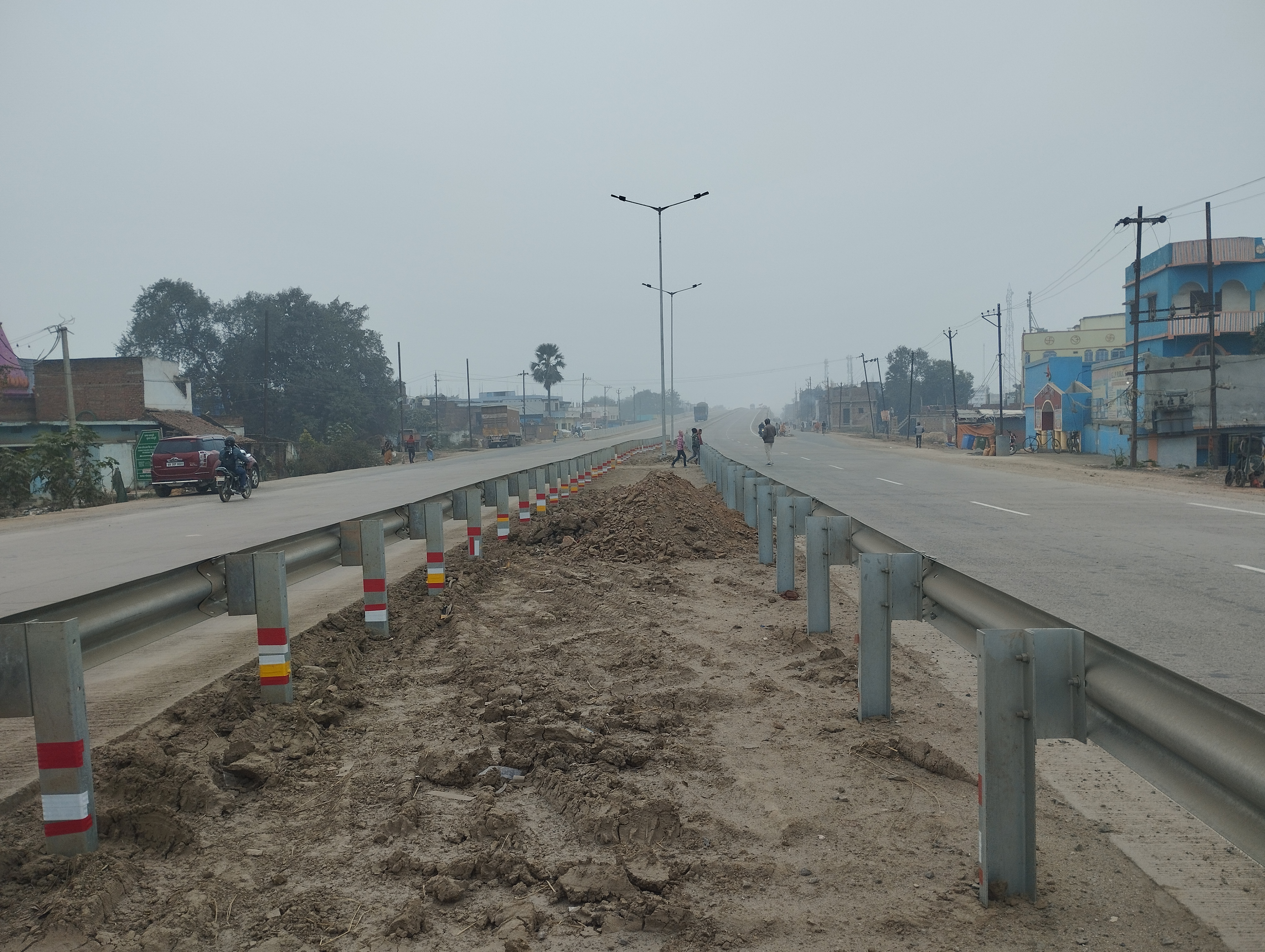
National highway 20, passes from pawapuri

=== Airways ===
Jai Prakash Narayan International Airport in Patna is the nearest airport.

== Economy ==
The entire economy of Pawapuri is based on agriculture; this area consists of three revenue villages. The small industries and local markets here also have a deep impact on the economy. Among the small industries, the brick industry, rice mills, and many hotels and restaurants are playing a major role in the economic development here. Small industries and the Bhagwan Mahavir Institute of Medical Sciences located here also provide employment to the people here.

In 2009, for the economic development here, the country's renowned economist Amartya Sen had urged Jain industrialists to invest here and provide economic upliftment to Pawapuri and surrounding areas.

== Politics ==
Pawapuri is a historical town located in the Nalanda district of Bihar and is currently a Nagar Panchayat. Before becoming a Nagar Panchayat, this area came under the purview of a Gramme Panchayat, which wasthea main market and centre of attraction in the area.

In 2020, a proposal was put before the state government by the district administration to convert it from Gramme Panchayat to Nagar Panchayat, which was fully implemented by the Bihar government in 2021. Before Nagar Panchayat, this area existed as Pokharpur Panchayat under the Giriyak block of Nalanda district, which existed with the independence of the country.

The politics here also affect regional and district politics. The total number of voters in this Nagar Panchayat is falling; in Rajgir Assembly, it is 13,256. Before 2022, like other panchayats in the block, only the chief got representation. The former Gramme Panchayat area consisted of seven villages, which are Pokharpur, Puri, Karampur, Rahimchak, Daulachak, Shobhnagar, and Sikarpur. After transformation into Nagar Panchayat, three more villages were included: Dasharathpur, Barabigha, and Purnabigha, earlier a part of Durgapur Panchayat of this block.

== Gallery ==
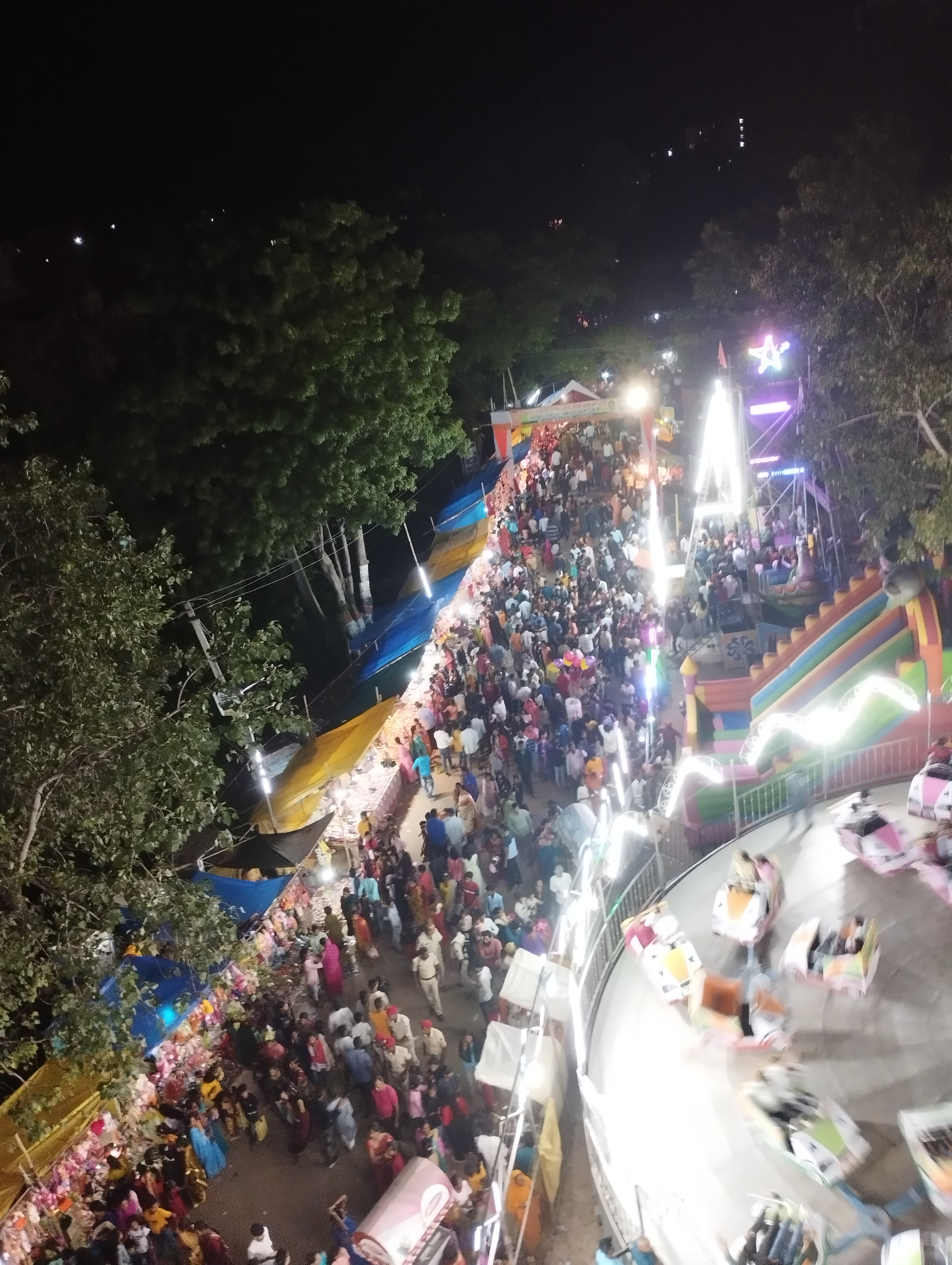
Nirvana mahotsav Fair in Pawapuri

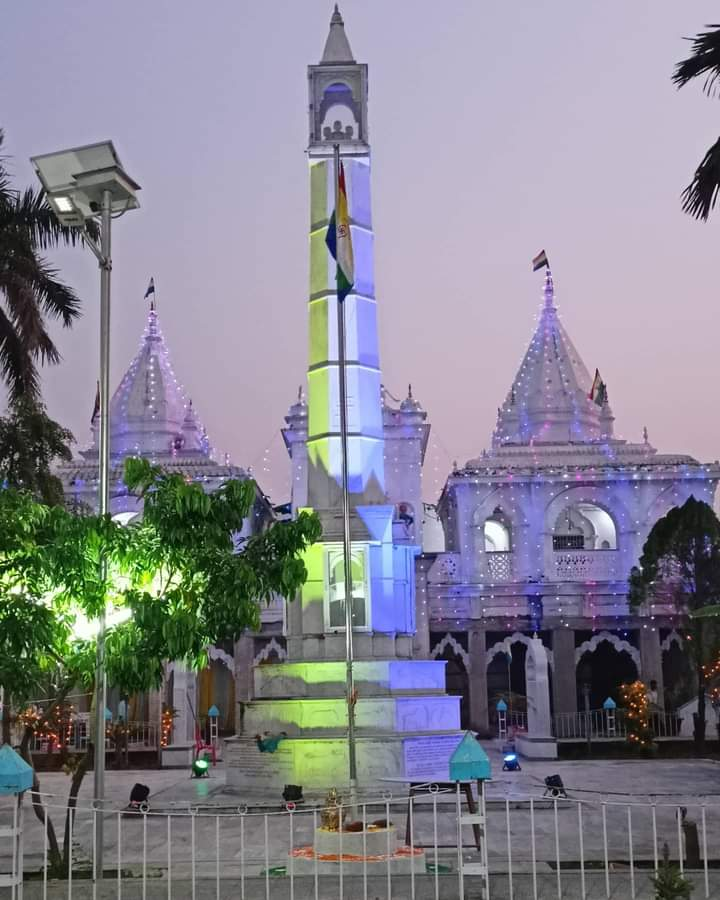
Digambar Jain Temple

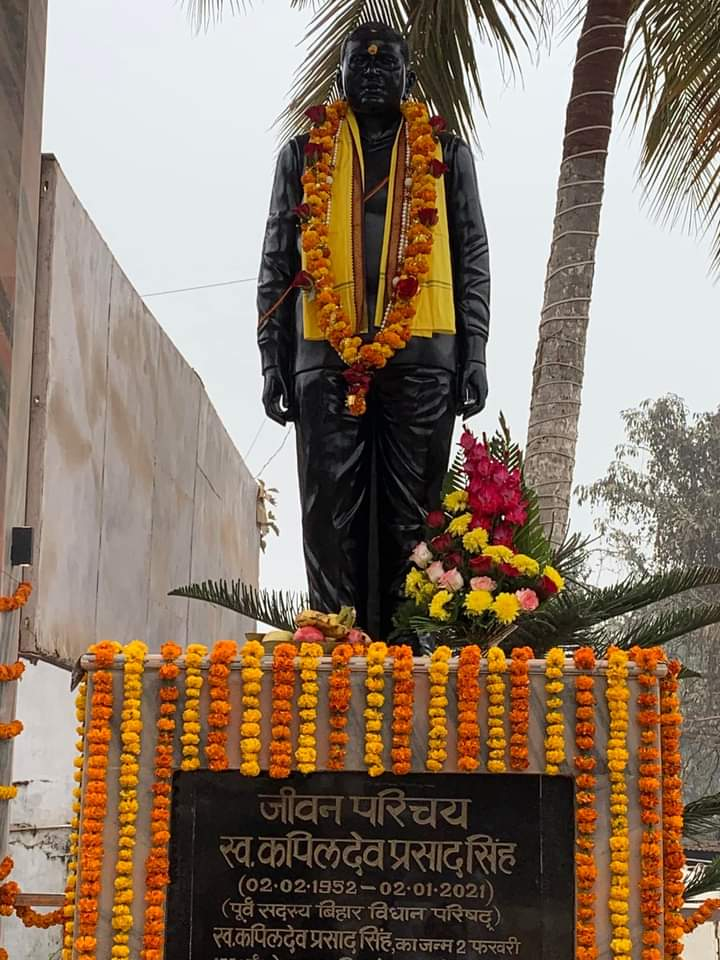
Statue of Kapildev Prasad Singh

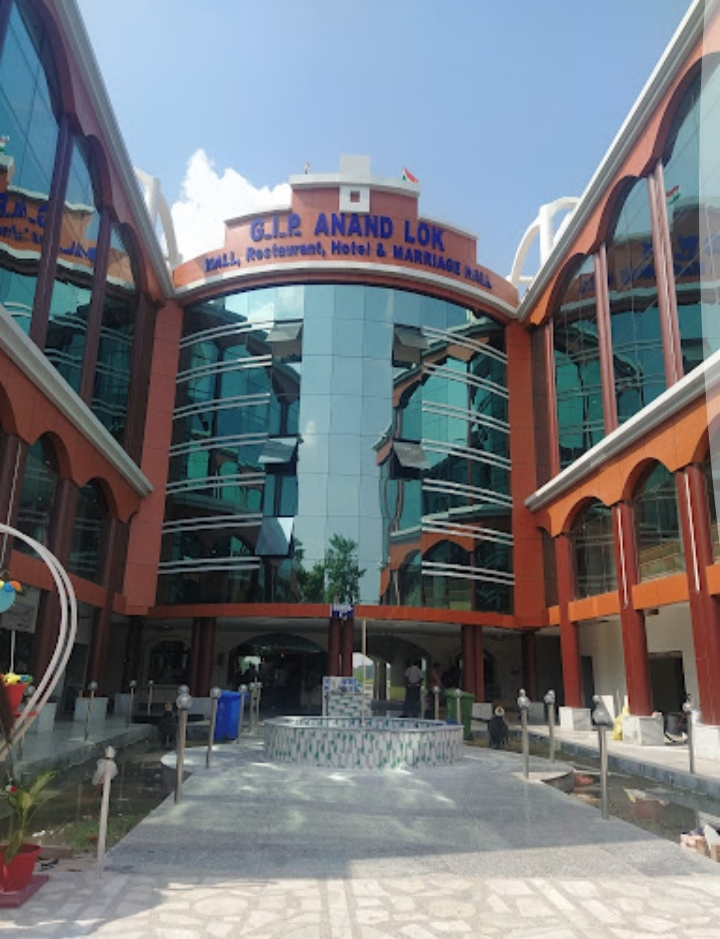
G.I.P Mall

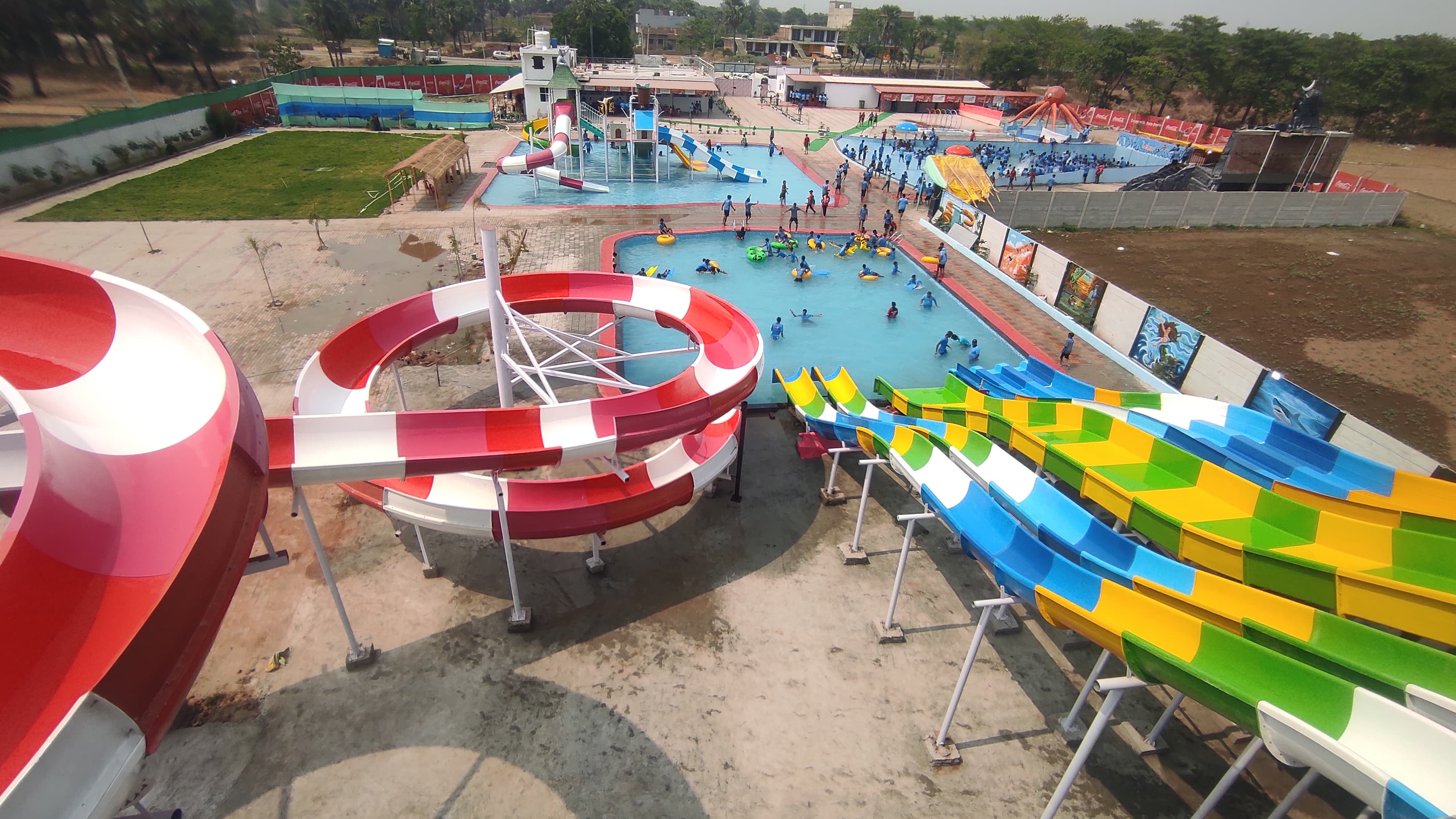
Lehar City Water Park

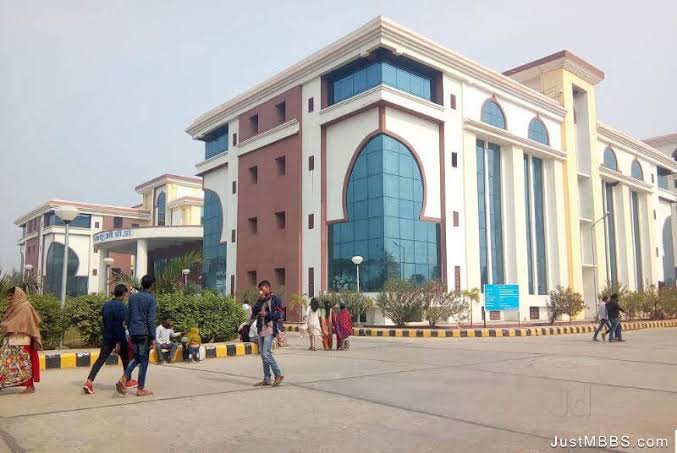
Bhagwan Mahavira Institute of Medical Sciences

== Notable people ==
- Kapildev Prasad Singh was an Indian politician and was a Former Member of Bihar Legislative Council.
- Mahavir, 24th Tirthankar of Jain

== See also ==
- Jal Mandir
- Nalanda

Pawapuri Tour And Travel Media related to Pawapuri at Wikimedia Commons
