= Ministry of Water and Environment (Uganda) =

Government ministry of Uganda

Coordinates: 00°17′56″N 32°38′56″E

- Coat of Arms of Uganda

Ministry overview
- Type: Ministry
- Jurisdiction: Government of Uganda
- Headquarters: Port Bell Road Luzira Kampala, Uganda
- Ministry executive: Sam Cheptoris, Minister of Water and Environment
- Website: www.mwe.go.ug

The Ministry of Water and Environment (MWE), is a government ministry responsible for managing the country's water resources, environment, wetlands, forestry, climate issues and sanitation policies. It is also a cabinet-level government ministry of Uganda. Its mission is to promote sustainable use of water and environmental resources for Uganda's development. It deal in things like: Water supply and sanitation, wetlands protection, climate change programs, forestry management, irrigation projects, environmental conservation.

Some bodies connected to it include: National Water and Sewerage Corporation (NWSC), National Environment Management Authority of Uganda (NEMA). The ministry is headed by Minister Sam Cheptoris.

== Location ==
The headquarters of the ministry are located on Port Bell Road, in the neighborhood of Luzira, in the Nakawa Division of Kampala, Uganda's capital and largest city. The coordinates of the ministry headquarters are 0°17'56.0"N, 32°38'56.0"E (Latitude:0.298889; Longitude:32.648889).

== Subministries ==
The minister is assisted by two (2) ministers of state.

- Minister of State for Water: Hon. Aisha Sekindi
- Minister of State for the Environment: Hon. Beatrice Anywar Atim

== Organisational structure ==
Administratively, the ministry is divided into three directorates:

- Directorate of Water Resources Management
- Directorate of Water Development
- Directorate of Environmental Affairs

== Autonomous agencies ==
The ministry works very closely with the following autonomous government agencies, in the effort to achieve its mandate.

- National Forestry Authority
- The Department of Climate Change
- National Environment Management Authority
- National Water and Sewerage Corporation
- Electricity Regulatory Authority

== List of ministers ==
- Sam Cheptoris (6 June 2016 - present)
- Ephraim Kamuntu (15 August 2012 - 6 June 2016)
- Maria Mutagamba (1 June 2006 - 15 August 2012)
- Kahinda Otafiire (2003 - 1 June 2006)

== See also ==
- Politics of Uganda
- Parliament of Uganda
- Samuel Mwandha
