= Stephen Basaliza =

Ugandan military officer

Hon. Col. (Rtd) Psc(U) Stephen Basaliza

Member of Parliament for
- In office 2001–2006
- Preceded by: Colonel (Rtd) Tom Butime
- Succeeded by: Kasaija Stephen Kagwera
- Constituency: Burahya County

Commissioner for the Uganda Human Rights Commission (UHRC)
- In office 2012–2023
- Preceded by: Margaret Sekaggya
- Succeeded by: Mariam Fauzat Wangadya

Personal details
- Party: National Resistance Army (NRA)
- Profession: Military Officer
- Known for: Member of Parliament, Constitutional Assembly Delegate

Steven Mwesige Basaliza aka 'Omudumizi' is a retired Ugandan military officer, politician, human rights activist and public servant. He has held various significant positions, including serving as a Member of Parliament for Burahya county and as a Commissioner of the Uganda Human Rights Commission (UHRC).

== Military career ==
Basaliza's military career is marked by his involvement in the National Resistance Army (NRA) during Uganda's liberation struggle. He was a member of the Uganda Patriotic Movement, which later evolved into the NRA/NRM. During the NRA bush war, he served as a lieutenant and is remembered for driving President Yoweri Museveni, then a member of the Front for National Salvation (Fronasa), in his father Emmanuel Basaliza’s Mercedes Benz 220S Sedan.

After the war, he continued his service in the Uganda Peoples’ Defence Forces (UPDF). He attended Kimaka Senior Command and Staff College in the 2nd intake, alongside notable UPDF Generals. He served as the Director of Human Rights in the UPDF from 2007 to 2010 and was appointed Chief of Pensions, Gratuity, and Survivor Benefits. In 2007, he was part of the first contingent of AMISOM troops deployed to Somalia under the command of Gen. Levi Karuhanga.

== Political career ==
Transitioning from military to politics, Basaliza represented Burahya County in Kabarole District as a Member of Parliament from 2001 to 2006. During his tenure, he was known for his advocacy on various issues affecting his constituents. In 2020, he expressed interest in representing the elderly in Western Uganda as a Member of Parliament. However, he later stepped aside in favor of Bishop Zebedee Masereka, emphasizing the need for unity among the elderly population.

== Service in the Uganda Human Rights Commission ==
Basaliza has had multiple tenures with the Uganda Human Rights Commission (UHRC). He was first appointed as a Commissioner in 2012. In 2022, President Yoweri Museveni re-appointed Basaliza to the UHRC, alongside Simeo Nsubuga and Omara Apita. The appointments were aimed at fully constituting the commission to expedite the handling of human rights cases. Basaliza was sworn in as a Commissioner on December 20, 2022, by Deputy Chief Justice Richard Buteera. UHRC Chairperson Mariam Wangadya described him as a gentleman of high moral standing and unquestionable integrity, bringing a wealth of knowledge and experience in human rights, peace, and security to the commission.

He was part of a tribunal that heard a case involving the killing of Innocent Twinomujuni by two police officers in Kabale, Uganda. The tribunal, which also included Mariam Wangadya, Crispin Kaheru, and Lamex Omaro Apitta, found that the actions of the police officers were “arrogant, high-handed, criminal, oppressive, intentional, deliberate, wanton, arbitrary, and reprehensible.” The tribunal awarded Shs45 million to Twinomujuni’s family as compensation for the violation of his right to life.
