= Barirega Akankwasah =

- Citizenship: Ugandan
- Education: Makerere University
- Occupations: Environmental specialist, conservationist
- Employer: National Environment Management Authority of Uganda
- Known for: Environmental conservation and leadership
- Title: Executive Director

Barirega Akankwasah also known as Akankwasa Barirega is a Ugandan environmental specialist and conservationist who serves as the executive director of the National Environment Management Authority (NEMA).

== Education background ==
Akankwasah holds a bachelor's degree in Environment and Natural Resource Management from Makerere University. He later obtained a Master of Science and a Doctor of Philosophy (PhD) in Environment and Natural Resource Management from Makerere University. He also holds a Diploma in Law.

== Career ==
Akankwasah began his career as a teacher and lecturer at Makerere University before joining Uganda's Ministry of Tourism, Wildlife and Antiquities. He served as a Senior Wildlife Officer and later as Principal Wildlife Officer from 2009 to 2013. He then served as Assistant Commissioner for Conservation Planning and Partnerships.

He also served as Commissioner for Wildlife Conservation at Uganda's Ministry of Tourism, Wildlife and Antiquities before serving as acting director of Tourism, Wildlife and Museums and Monuments. Akankwasah also served as Head of the Department of Wildlife Conservation in the Ministry of Tourism, Wildlife and Antiquities.

In 2020, Akankwasah was elected as the Vice President of the Conference of the Parties to the Convention on the Conservation of Migratory Species of Wild Animals. In 2021, the Minister responsible for the environment appointed him as executive director of NEMA.

Akankwasah has also served as a member of the Board of Trustees of the Uganda Wildlife Authority and as chairperson of its Human Resource Committee. He also served as a member of the Governing Council of the Uganda Wildlife Research and Training Institute.

== See also ==
- Tom Okurut
- Tom Butime
- Serapio Rukundo
- Gladys Kalema-Zikusoka
- Lamex Omara Apitta
