= Odisha (disambiguation) =

Odisha is an Indian state in Eastern India.

Odisha may also refer to:

== Sports ==
- Odisha cricket team, a cricket team in Odisha, India
- Odisha women's cricket team, a women's cricket team in Odisha, India
- Hockey Odisha (Odisha Hockey Team), a field hockey team in Odisha, India
- Odisha rugby union team, a men's rugby team in Odisha, India
- Odisha women's rugby union team, a women's rugby team in Odisha, India
- Odisha football team, a men's football team in Odisha, India
- Odisha women's football team, a women's football team in Odisha, India
- Odisha FC, a football team in Bhubaneswar, Odisha, India
- Odisha Open, an annual badminton tournament in Odisha, India

== Companies, groups, organizations ==
- Odisha TV, an Odia Indian cable television station
- Air Odisha, a regional airline of India operating from Odisha

== Other uses ==
- Odisha (genus), a genus of flowering plant
- Odisha Day, a public holiday in Odisha, India
- Odisha circuit, a Hindi film distribution circuit in Odisha

== See also ==
- Orissa (disambiguation)
- Orisha (disambiguation)
- Odia (disambiguation)
- Odra (disambiguation)
- Utkala (disambiguation)
- Odesa (disambiguation)
- Odessa (disambiguation)
- Edessa (disambiguation)
- Outline of Odisha (Odisha, India)
- Central University of Odisha (Odisha, India)
- Odisha University of Technology and Research (Odisha, India)
- Odisha University of Agriculture and Technology (Odisha, India)
- Odisha Adarsha Vidyalaya (English: Odisha Model School), a chain of schools in Odisha, India
- Odisha State Film Awards, Odisha, India
