= National Environment Management Authority =

National Environment Management Authority may refer to one of the following:

- National Environment Management Authority of Kenya
- National Environment Management Authority of Uganda
