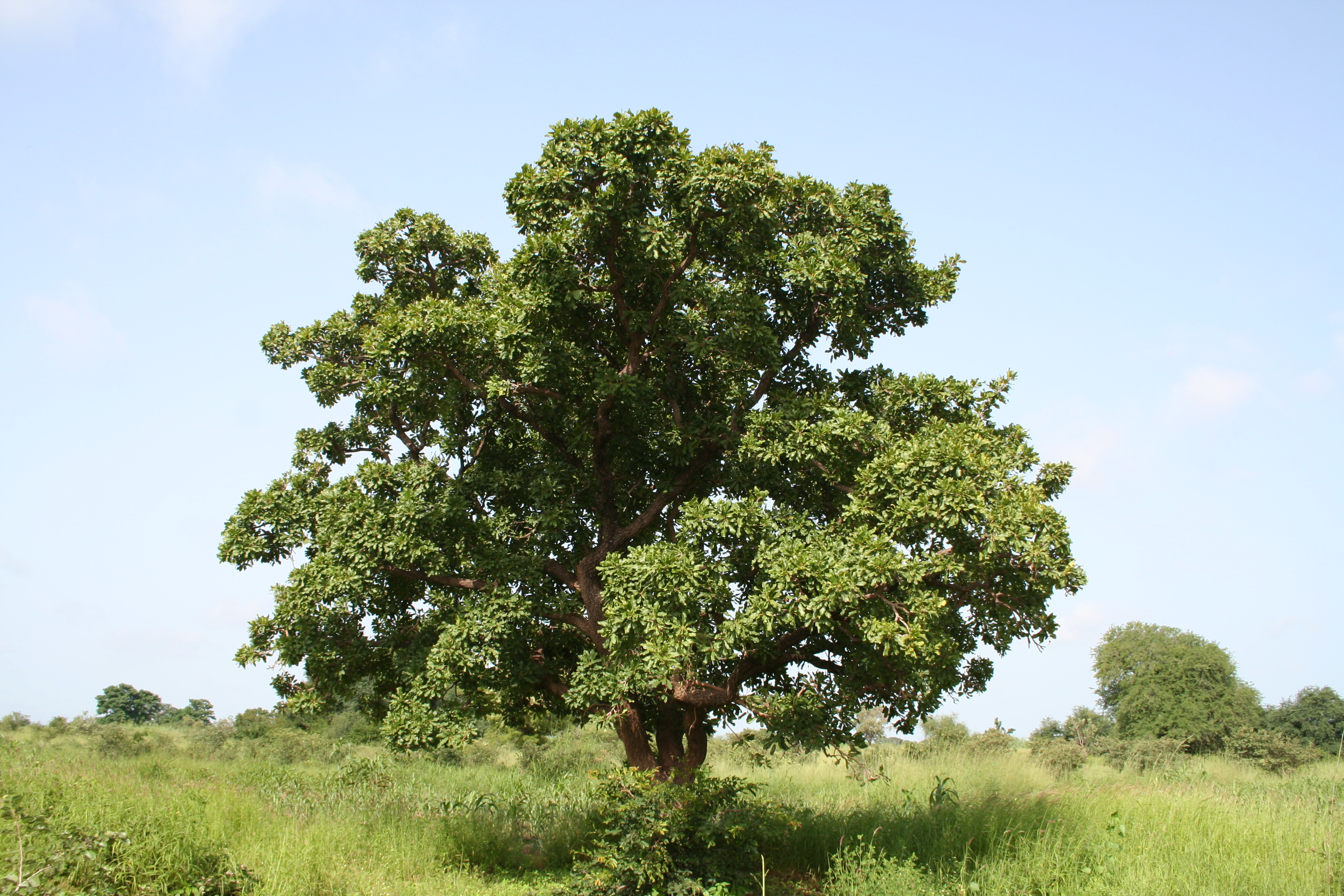
- Shea tree
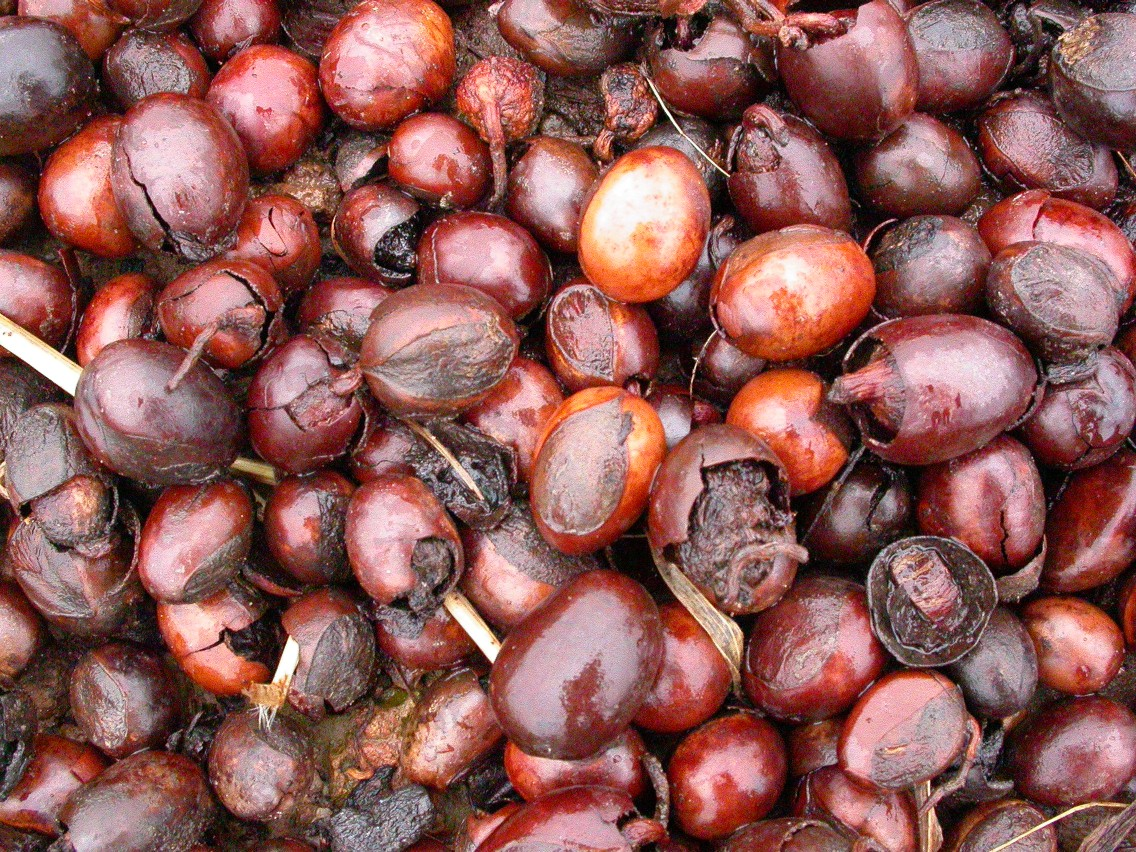
- Shea nuts

Conservation status
- Vulnerable (IUCN 2.3)

Scientific classification
- Kingdom: Plantae
- Clade: Embryophytes
- Clade: Tracheophytes
- Clade: Spermatophytes
- Clade: Angiosperms
- Clade: Eudicots
- Clade: Asterids
- Order: Ericales
- Family: Sapotaceae
- Subfamily: Sapotoideae
- Genus: Vitellaria; C.F.Gaertn.
- Species: V. paradoxa

Binomial name
- Vitellaria paradoxa C.F.Gaertn.

Synonyms
- Butyrospermum Kotschy; Micadania R.Br.; Butyrospermum paradoxum (C.F.Gaertn.) Hepper; Butyrospermum parkii (G.Don) Kotschy; Lucuma paradoxa (C.F.Gaertn.) A.DC.

= Vitellaria =

Genus of trees

Vitellaria paradoxa (formerly Butyrospermum parkii), commonly known as shea tree, shi tree (/ˈʃiː(ə)/, also /ʃeɪ/), or vitellaria, is a tree of the family Sapotaceae. It is the only species in the genus Vitellaria, and is indigenous to Africa.

The shea fruit consists of a thin, tart, nutritious pulp that surrounds a relatively large, oil-rich seed from which shea butter is extracted. It is a deciduous tree usually 7–15 m (23–49 ft) tall, but has reached 25 m (82 ft) and a trunk diameter of 2 m (6.6 ft).

The shea tree is a traditional African food plant. It has been said to have potential to improve nutrition, boost food supply in the "annual hungry season", foster rural development, and support sustainable land care.

== Description ==
The tree starts bearing its first fruit when it is 10 to 15 years old; full production is attained when the tree is about 20 to 30 years old. It then produces nuts for up to 200 years.

The fruits resemble large plums 4 to 8 centimetres long weighing between 10 and 57 grams each. These fruits take 4 to 6 months to ripen; the average yield is 15 to 20 kg (33 to 44 lb) of fresh fruit per tree, with optimum yields up to 45 kilograms (99 pounds). Each kilogram of fruit gives approximately 400 grams (14 ounces) of dry seeds. The fruit is edible.

== Nomenclature and taxonomy ==
Vitellaria is a monotypic genus, i.e., it has only one species. The species has variously been known botanically as Vitellaria paradoxa, Butyrospermum parkii, and Butyrospermum paradoxum. Many botanical works from the late 19th and much of the 20th centuries used the name Butyrospermum parkii, which is still commonly found in the cosmetics trade. However, Vitellaria paradoxa is the oldest name (published in 1807) and has been generally used in recent decades, as necessitated by the rules of botanical nomenclature; efforts in 1962 to make Butyrospermum the official scientific name for the genus (i.e., to "conserve" the name) were unsuccessful.

The species has two subspecies:

- Vitellaria paradoxa subsp. paradoxa (roughly from the Nigeria-Cameroon border westward)
- Vitellaria paradoxa subsp. nilotica (Kotschy) A.N. Henry & Chithra & N.C. Nair (roughly from the Nigeria-Cameroon border eastward)

== Distribution and habitat ==
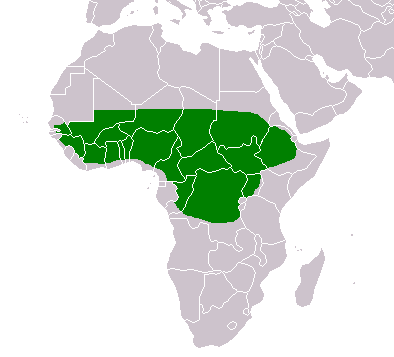
Distribution of shea trees

The shea tree grows naturally in the wild in the dry savannah belt from Senegal in the west to Sudan and South Sudan in the east, and onto the foothills of the Ethiopian highlands. It occurs in 19 countries across the African continent, namely Benin, Burkina Faso, Cameroon, Central African Republic, Chad, Ethiopia, Ghana, Guinea Bissau, Ivory Coast, Mali, Niger, Nigeria, Senegal, Sierra Leone, South Sudan, Sudan, Togo, Uganda, Democratic Republic of the Congo, and Guinea. The habitat area extends over more than 5,000 kilometres (3,100 mi).

A testa found at the site of the medieval village of Saouga is evidence of shea butter production by the 14th century.

In Uganda, shea trees are found in the Lira and Otuke districts of Northern Uganda. To protect the species, the National Environmental Management Authority (NEMA) issued a directive banning the cutting of shea trees.

== Uses ==
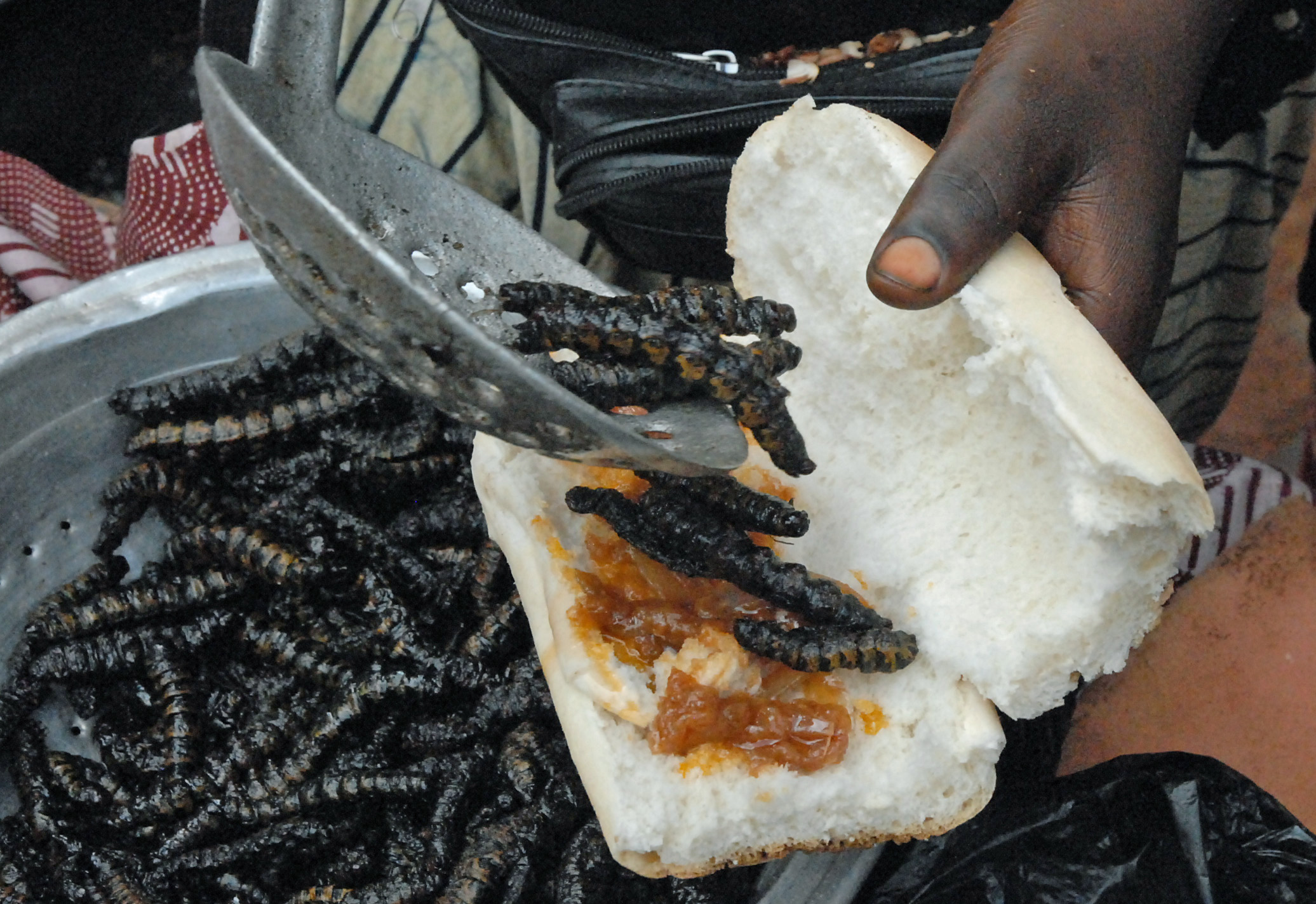
Preparing a sandwich with fried shea tree caterpillars at the Boromo bus station in Burkina Faso.

Shea butter has many uses and may or may not be refined. In the West it is most commonly used as an emollient in cosmetics and is less commonly used in food. Throughout Africa it is used extensively for food, is a major source of dietary fat, and for medicinal purposes. In Ghana and Nigeria, shea butter is a major ingredient for making the African black soap. In the Lango and Acholi cultures, shea butter (known as Moo Yao in Luo), is used to enthrone clan and traditional leaders.

Among the Yoruba in West Africa as well as in the Afro-Brazilian diaspora religions in Brazil, it is believed that this fruit holds mystical powers. In Brazil, it is widely used by practitioners of Afro-Brazilian religions, especially in initiation rituals and in the preparation of food offerings for the Orishas, being used particularly in foods dedicated to Oxalá.

Fat is traditionally extracted from the kernels by roasting and pressing them. The resulting liquid is boiled, sieved and cooled. The fat, shea butter, is used as food and for medicine and cosmetics.

The edible protein-rich caterpillars of the moth Cirina butyrospermi which feed solely on its leaves are widely collected and eaten raw, dried or fried.

=== Composition of shea butter ===
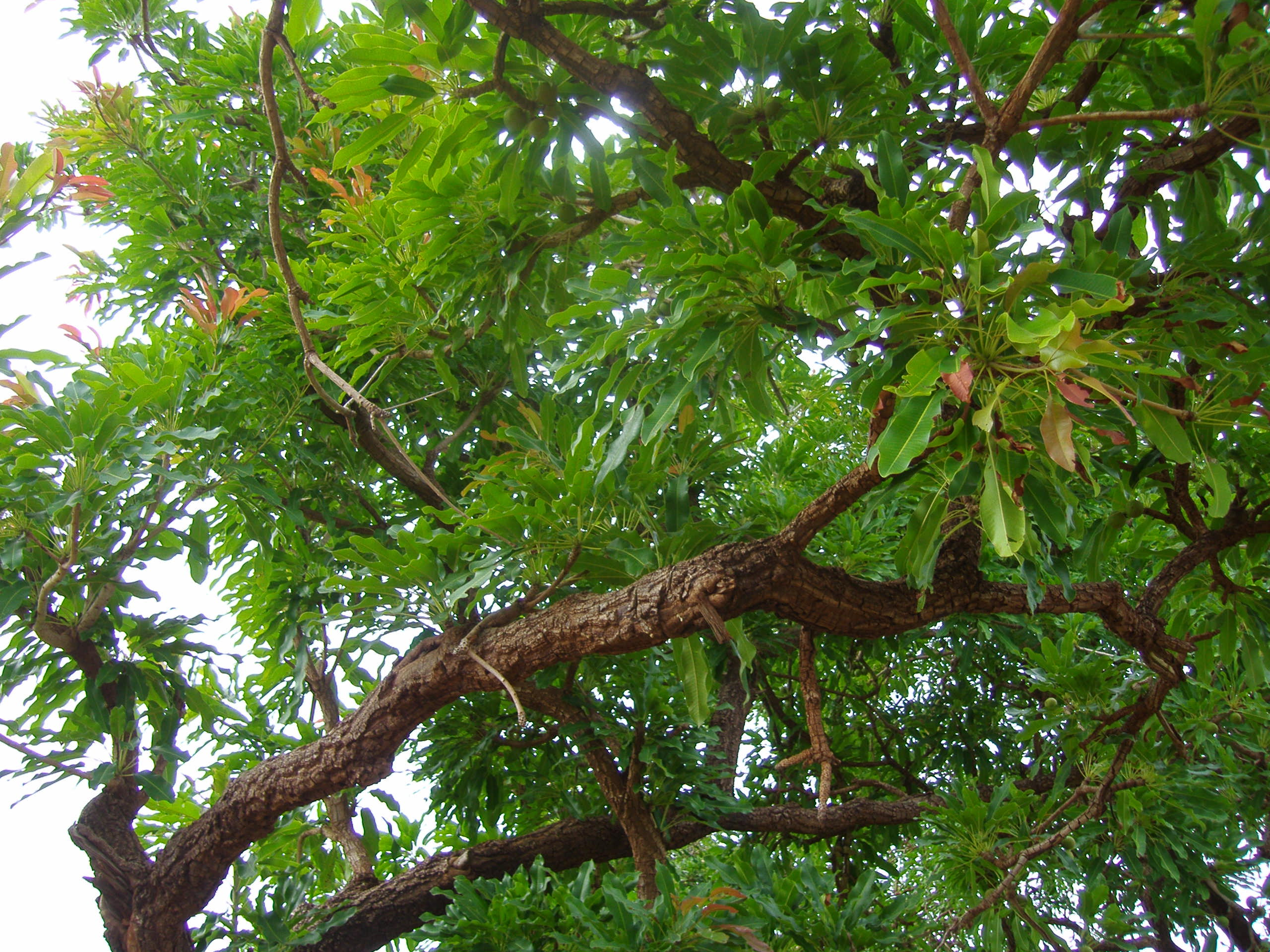
Leaves of a shea nut tree

Shea butter extract is a complex fat that in addition to many nonsaponifiable components (substances that cannot be fully converted into soap by treatment with alkali) contains the following fatty acids: oleic acid (40–60%), stearic acid (20–50%), linoleic acid (3–11%), palmitic acid (2–9%), linolenic acid (<1%) and arachidic acid (<1%). It also contains the vitamins A, E and F.

== Nutritional value ==
The fruit pulp has a high vitamin C content (196.1 mg/100 g). 50 g of the pulp provides 332% of the recommended daily intake of children (4–8 years old), and 98% of that for pregnant women. The fruit's kernels are rich in fat (17.4–59.1 g/100 g dry weight). The fat from the kernels have antioxidant and anti-inflammatory properties.

== Etymology ==
The common name is shíyiri (in N'Ko: ߛ߭ߌ߭ߦߌߙߌ) or shísu (ߛ߭ߌ߭ߛߎ, lit. "shea tree") in the Bambara language of Mali. This is the origin of the English word, whose primary pronunciation is /ʃiː/ (rhyming with "tea"), although the pronunciation /ʃeɪ/ (rhyming with "day") is common and is listed second in major dictionaries. The tree is called ghariti in the Wolof language of Senegal, which is the origin of the French name of the tree and the butter, karité.

In Hausa language the tree is called Kaɗe or Kaɗanya. Indeed, the shea tree is so indispensable in Mole-Dagbang culinary and ethno-botanical practices that the Northern Ghanaian city of Tamale etymologically derives its name from the more traditional Dagomba name 'Tama-yile' (meaning 'Home of Shea nuts').

The tree was formerly classified in the genus Butyrospermum, meaning "butter seed". The species name parkii honors Scottish explorer Mungo Park, who learned of the tree while exploring Senegal. Park's Scottish origin is reflected in the English word shea, with a final -ea.
