= Nalongo Nana Mwafrika =

Ugandan Human rights activist

Nana Mwafrika Mbarikiwa
- Annette Nana Namata
- Born: Annet Namata
- Other names: Nalongo Nana
- Citizenship: Uganda
- Employer: Front Line Defenders Uganda
- Known for: Human rights activism

Annet Namata also known as Nana Mwafrika Mbarikiwa, Nalongo Nana, Nana MwaAfrika, Annette Nana Namata, Nana Mwafrika Mbarikiwa (born 1977) is a Ugandan executive director and a human rights activist within the political and women rights space. She is the executive director of Front Line Defenders Uganda.

== Activism ==
Nana Mwafrika's activism journey begun at the age of 15 years when she stood up to defend a young school girl who had less funds for her transportation fee to Masaka.

On 7 September 2018, Nana Mwafrika stormed the tax policy Uganda meeting hosted by ACODE at Protea Hotel in Kampala demanding for fairness to tax payers than sitting in fancy hotels and spending tax payers money. Namata's story was featured on BBC.

On 24 April 2019, Nana was assaulted by a female police officer stuck her hand into her birth canal at the Uganda Police Head quarters in Nagulu while she went to demonstrate against police dispersing of the FDC rallies, deployment of police officers at Bobi Wine's home in Kyadondo in March and the killing of Ssebulime. After the police assault, she was taken to Iran-Uganda hospital (a hospital run by the Uganda police) for medical checks for a medical check up.

On the 18 June 2019, the gynaecologist at Kampala Independent Hospital in Ntinda operated her to remove her 6 months baby and put it in the incubator and also they removed the uterus due to hematoma on her Uterus and intense bleeding that was caused by raptured bladder. Nana is a mother to five children.

On 6 January 2022, Nana Mwafrika and other human rights activists were arrested at Uganda Human Rights Commission head office in Nagulu as they had gone to deliver a petition over the detention of kakwenza Rukirabashaija. The activists under their coalition “Friends of Kakwenza” called upon the Uganda Human Rights Commission (UHRC) chairperson Margaret Wangadya to resign and also release kakwenza Rukirabashaija among other requests.

On 25 July 2024, Nana Mwafrika was among the protesters that were arrested in the match to parliament during the anti corruption protests in Uganda and she was remanded to Luzira prison at the Buganda Road Court. The protestors demanded that Anita Among to resign together with Uganda parliamentary commissioners and legislators who were involved in corruption scandals.
