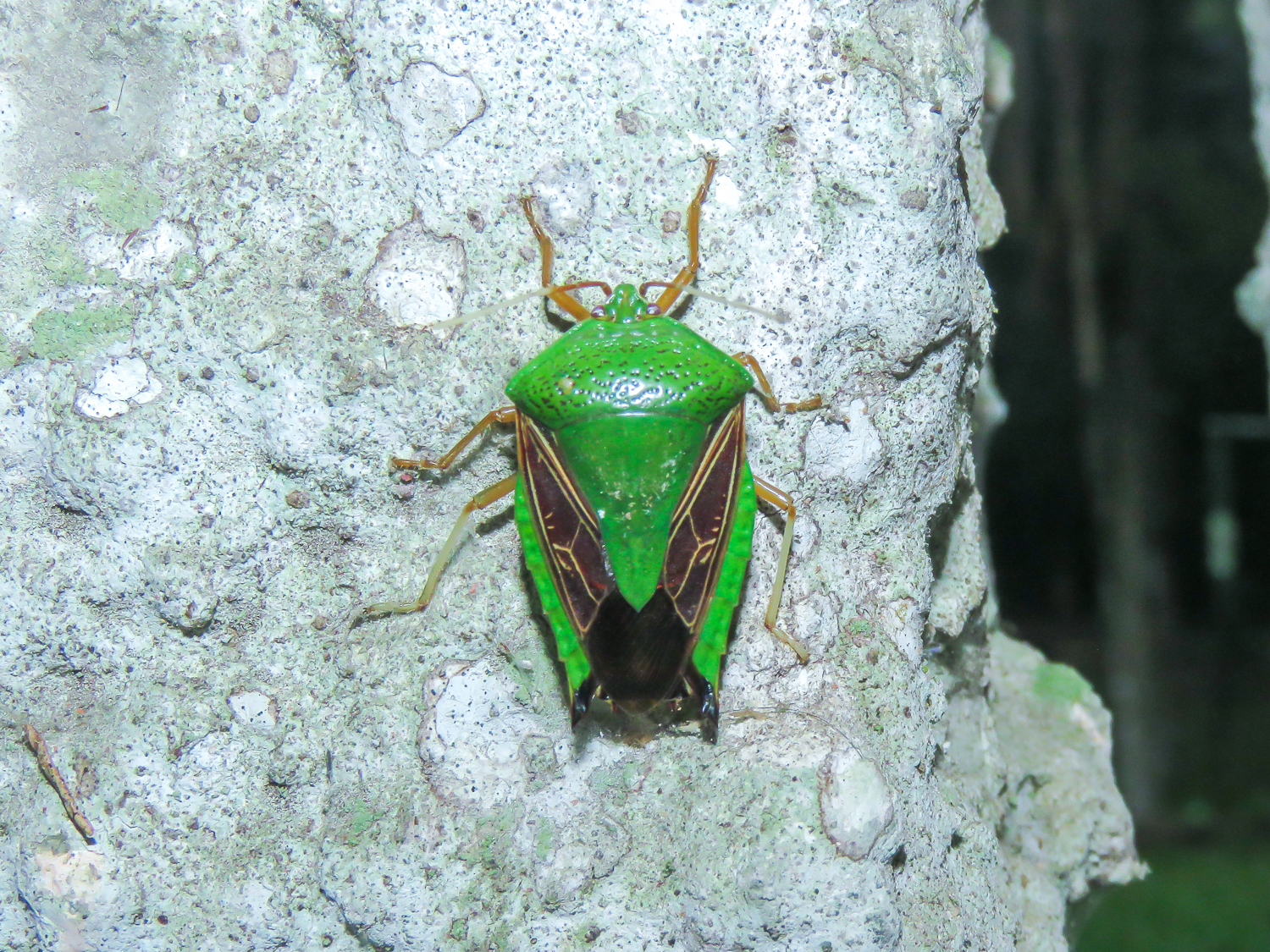

Scientific classification
- Kingdom: Animalia
- Phylum: Arthropoda
- Class: Insecta
- Order: Hemiptera
- Suborder: Heteroptera
- Family: Pentatomidae
- Genus: Pygoda
- Species: P. polita

Binomial name
- Pygoda polita (Lepeletier & Serville, 1825)

Synonyms
- Pentatoma polita Lepeletier & Serville, 1825; Edessa polita (Dallas, 1851)

= Pygoda polita =

Species of stink bug

Pygoda polita is a species of stink bug in the family Pentatomidae found in South America. It was first described as Pentatoma polita by Lepeletier and Serville in 1825, included under genus Edessa in 1851, and subsequently renamed under genus Pygoda in 2018.
