= Permanent Presidential Commission on Soil Conservation and Afforestation =

The Permanent Presidential Commission on Soil Conservation and Afforestation (PPCSCA) was a Kenyan government Commission established to promote conservation and afforestation, monitoring progress and coordinating the activities of the different organizations involved. It was established in 1981 and was made up of members representing different regions of the country.

On 1 July 2002 following the merger of three government departments, namely: the National Environment Secretariat (NES), the Permanent Presidential Commission on Soil Conservation and Afforestation (PPCSCA), and the Department of Resource Surveys and Remote Sensing (DRSRS) a new government agency National Environment Management Authority (NEMA) was formed.

== See also ==
- National Environment Management Authority (NEMA)
