= Orissa (disambiguation) =

Orissa is the former name of the state of Odisha in India.

Orissa may also refer to:

== Places ==
- Orissa Subah, a Mughal imperial province
- Bihar and Orissa Province, a province of British India from 1912 to 1936
- Orissa Province, a province of British India from 1936 to 1947
- Orissa Tributary States, a group of princely states of British India
- Orissa circuit, a Hindi film distribution circuit in Odisha

== Other uses ==
- Orissa (film), a 2013 Malayalam film directed by M. Padmakumar
- Orissa cyclone, a 1999 tropical cyclone in the Indian Ocean
- HMIS Orissa (J200), a Bangor-class minesweeper launched in 1941
- Orissa, the name of Odisha cricket team until 2011

== See also ==
- Orisha (disambiguation)
- Orissi (disambiguation)
- Odisha (disambiguation)
- Odia (disambiguation)
