= Odesa (disambiguation) =

Odesa is a city on the northern shore of the Black Sea, the third-largest city of Ukraine.

Odesa may also refer to:

== Places ==
- Odesa Raion, one of the districts of Odesa Oblast, Ukraine
- Odesa Oblast, Ukraine, the eponymous region of Odesa
- Odesa International Airport, airport at Odesa, Ukraine
- Odesa railway station, train station at Odesa, Ukraine
- Odesa Soviet Republic, former republic of USSR becoming later an Odesa region of Ukraine

== Sports ==
- HC Odesa, an ice hockey team in Odesa, Ukraine
- SC Odesa, a football club in Odesa, Ukraine
- FC Odesa, a football club in Odesa, Ukraine

== See also ==
- Nova Odesa, a town at Mykolaiv oblast, Ukraine
- Odessa Mama (disambiguation) including Odesa Mama
- Odesza, U.S. electronica band
- Odessa (disambiguation)
- Odisha (disambiguation)
- Orissa (disambiguation)
- Edessa (disambiguation)
