= Odea =

Odea may refer to:

- J. L. Odea (born 1884), Australian tennis player
- O'Dea, a surname of Irish origin
- Plural of Odeum, ancient Greek or Roman buildings built for musical activities

== See also ==
- Odeax, a brand name of demoxytocin
- Odia (disambiguation)
