= Odra =

Odra may refer to:

== Rivers ==
- Odra (Baltic Sea), better known as Oder, a river in the Czech Republic, Poland and Germany
- Odra (Kupa), a river in Croatia
- Odra (Pisuerga), a river in Spain

== Populated places ==
- Odra, Silesian Voivodeship, a village in southern Poland
- Odra, Lubusz Voivodeship, a village in western Poland
- Odra kingdom, a kingdom of ancient India, in the present-day state of Odisha
- Odra, Zagreb, a village in Croatia
- Odra Sisačka, a village in Croatia

== Other uses ==
- Office of Dispute Resolution for Acquisition, an independent tribunal within the United States Federal Aviation Administration
- Odra (computer), a computer once made in Poland
- Odra (magazine), a Polish art and culture magazine
- Odra Wodzisław, a Polish football club from Wodzisław Śląski
- Odra Opole, a Polish football club from Opole
- Odra Prakrit, an Indo-Aryan language of ancient India, ancestral to modern Odia, spoken in Odisha, India

== See also ==
- Odisha (disambiguation)
