= Odessa (disambiguation) =

Odessa most commonly refers to:

- Odesa, Ukraine, the third-largest city in Ukraine, spelled "Odessa" in Russian and historically in English
- Odessa, Texas, a city in western Texas

Odessa may also refer to:

== Places ==
=== Brazil ===
- Nova Odessa ("New Odessa"), a town

=== Canada ===
- Odessa, Ontario
- Odessa Lake (Ontario), in Eastern Ontario
- Odessa, Saskatchewan

=== United States ===
- Odessa, Delaware
- Odessa, Florida
- Odessa, Michigan, a ghost town
- Lake Odessa, Michigan
- Odessa, Minnesota
- Odessa, Missouri
- Odessa, Nebraska
- Odessa, New York
- Odessa, Oregon
- Odessa, Washington
- Odessa, West Virginia
- Odessa Township (disambiguation), multiple places

== People with the name ==
- Odessa (given name) (including a list of people with the name)

== Entertainment, arts ==
=== Film or TV ===
- "Odessa", the second episode of the mini-series Heroes Reborn

=== Music albums ===
- Odessa (Bee Gees album), 1969
- Odessa (The Handsome Family album), 1994

=== Songs ===
- "Odessa (City on the Black Sea)", by the Bee Gees (1969)
- "Odessa", by Aesop Rock from Appleseed (1999)
- "Odessa", by Animals as Leaders from Weightless (2011)
- "Odessa", by Caribou from Swim (2010)
- "Odessa", by Tiger Lou from A Partial Print (2008)

== Other uses ==
- ODESSA, a supposed organisation of former members of the Nazi SS that most historians claim is a myth
- Odessa (Wild ARMs 2), a fictional terrorist organisation from the PlayStation role-playing game Wild ARMs 2
- Odessa (yacht), Volvo Ocean 60 class
- List of storms named Odessa, tropical cyclones with the same name
  - Typhoon Odessa (1985), tropical cyclone in the Western Pacific
- ODESSA, more commonly known as the White House Plumbers

== See also ==
- Odesa (disambiguation)
- Odesza, an American musical group
- The Odessa File, a 1972 novel by Frederick Forsyth
- The Odessa File (film), a 1974 film
- Odessa Stories, collection of short stories by Isaac Babel
- Little Odessa (film), a 1995 film directed by James Gray
- Odessa Mama (disambiguation)
- Edessa (disambiguation)
