= Kipoi =

Kipoi may refer to:

- Kipoi, Evros, a village in the Evros regional unit, Greece
- Kipoi, Ioannina, a village in Zagori in Ioannina regional unit, Greece
- Kipoi Tonny Nsubuga, a Ugandan politician
