= Mariam Fauzat Wangadya =

Ugandan lawyer and advocate

- Mariam Mutonyi Wangadya
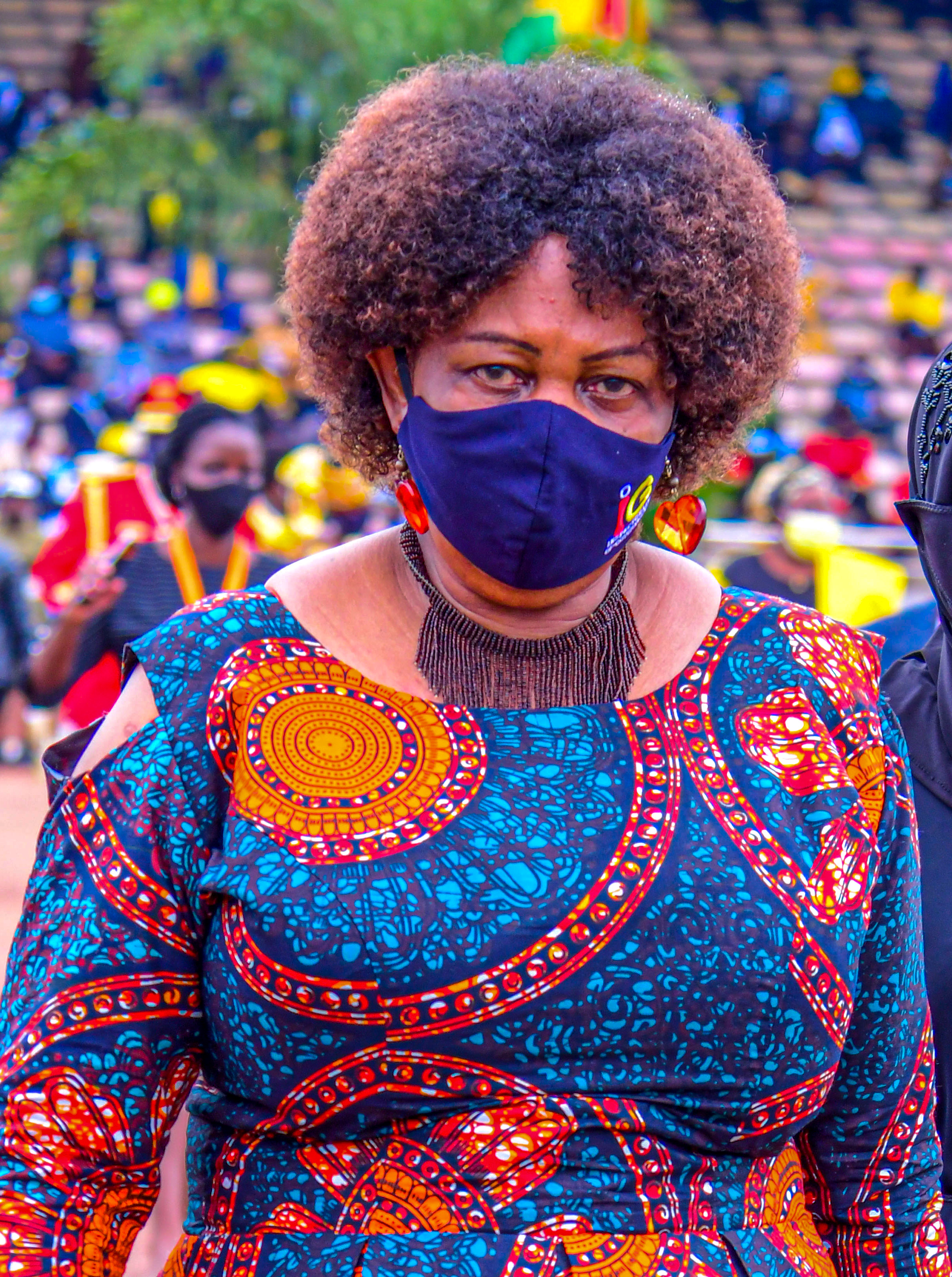
- Mariam Wangadya
- Born: Bulambuli District, Eastern Region, Uganda
- Other name: Mariam Mutonyi Wangadya
- Education: O-levels at Ngora High School, Advanced Level education at Kibuli Secondary School, Bachelor of Laws at Makerere University, a diploma in Legal Practice at the Law Development Center, a master's degree in public administration and management
- Occupations: Lawyer, Advocate and Chairperson for Uganda Human Rights Commission
- Employer: Uganda Human Rights Commission
- Known for: Fighting for civic, political, and children's rights
- Children: 1

Mariam Fauzat Wangadya (also known as Mariam Mutonyi Wangadya or Margaret Wangadya) is a Ugandan lawyer and advocate for civil, political, and children's rights. Wangadya is the chairperson of the Uganda Human Rights Commission. She is also a member of the East African Law Society, the Uganda Law Society, the International Bar Association and the Uganda Women Lawyers Association (FIDA Uganda).

== Biography ==
=== Early life and education ===
Wangadya was born in Bulambuli district to two retired teachers and has five siblings.

She completed her Ordinary Level education at Ngora High School and her Advanced Level education at Kibuli Secondary School. She graduated with a Bachelor of Laws from Makerere University and a diploma in Legal Practice from the Law Development Center. After receiving her Certificate of Admission and Enrollment as an Advocate of the High Court of Uganda. she also obtained a master's degree in Public Administration and Management in Uganda.

=== Career ===
Wangadya began her career at Dagira and Company Advocates, a private law firm in Mbale district, where she eventually became a partner. She also volunteered as a legal practitioner with the Uganda Women Lawyers Association (FIDA Uganda).

In 1996, Wangadya was appointed as one of the founding pioneer members of the Uganda Human Rights Commission (UHRC) at its inception. She served in this role alongside notable figures such as Margaret Sekaggya and Med Sozi Kaggwa.

Wangadya left the Uganda Human Rights Commission in 2013 upon her appointment as deputy Inspector General of Government, a position she served in up to 2021.

In July 2021, she was appointed as the chairperson of the Uganda Human Rights Commission by Yoweri Museveni, and she was vetted by the Appointments Committee of the Parliament of Uganda. She assumed her office on 29 September 2021, after she was sworn in by Alfonso Owiny-Dollo.

In 2023, Wangadya, on behalf of the UHRC, signed a memorandum of understanding with the National Fellowship of Born-Again Pentecostal churches of Uganda (NFBPCU) that is meant to curb human rights violations against Born-Again churches and also regulate them. This memorandum of understanding is meant to last up to 2028, but through a written mutual agreement, it can be extended.

In 2023, Wangadya, while serving as the chairperson for UHRC, accused National Unity Platform (NUP) leaders of weaponising abductions for their political interests and gains. The NUP leaders claimed that Ugandan security agents had been kidnapping and torturing NUP supporters since 2020. UHRC found out that some of the members on the list were indeed captured and released in December 2022.

In 2024, Wangadya presented the Uganda Human Rights Commission (UHRC) report to the Parliament of Uganda, containing information about the welfare and operations of the Uganda Police Force (UPF). The report raised concerns about officer living conditions, unarmed officers, the use of ropes as handcuffs, unfair deployments, and the transfer of police officers based on bribery and favouritism.

== Personal life ==
Wangadya is a mother with one son.

== See also ==
- Bart Magunda Katureebe
- Alfonse Owiny-Dollo
