= Orisi =

Orisi may be:

- an alternative spelling of Orissi, an adjective form of "Orissa", a state in India
- a misspelling of Orici, a fictional character of the Stargate TV series
- a Fijian name
  - Orisi Cavuilati, rugby player
  - Orisi Rabukawaqa, army officer
