= Simeo Muwanga Nsubuga =

Ugandan politician

Hon. Simeo Muwanga Nsubuga
- Simeo Muwanga Nsubuga

Commissioner of the Uganda Human Rights Commission
- Incumbent
- Assumed office 20 December 2022

Member of the Parliament of Uganda

Member of Parliament for Mityana South
- In office May 2016 – May 2021
- Succeeded by: Michael Muhumuza

Personal details
- Born: 4 December 1973 (age 52) Uganda
- Citizenship: Ugandan
- Party: National Resistance Movement
- Occupation: Politician, diplomat, human rights defender, police officer

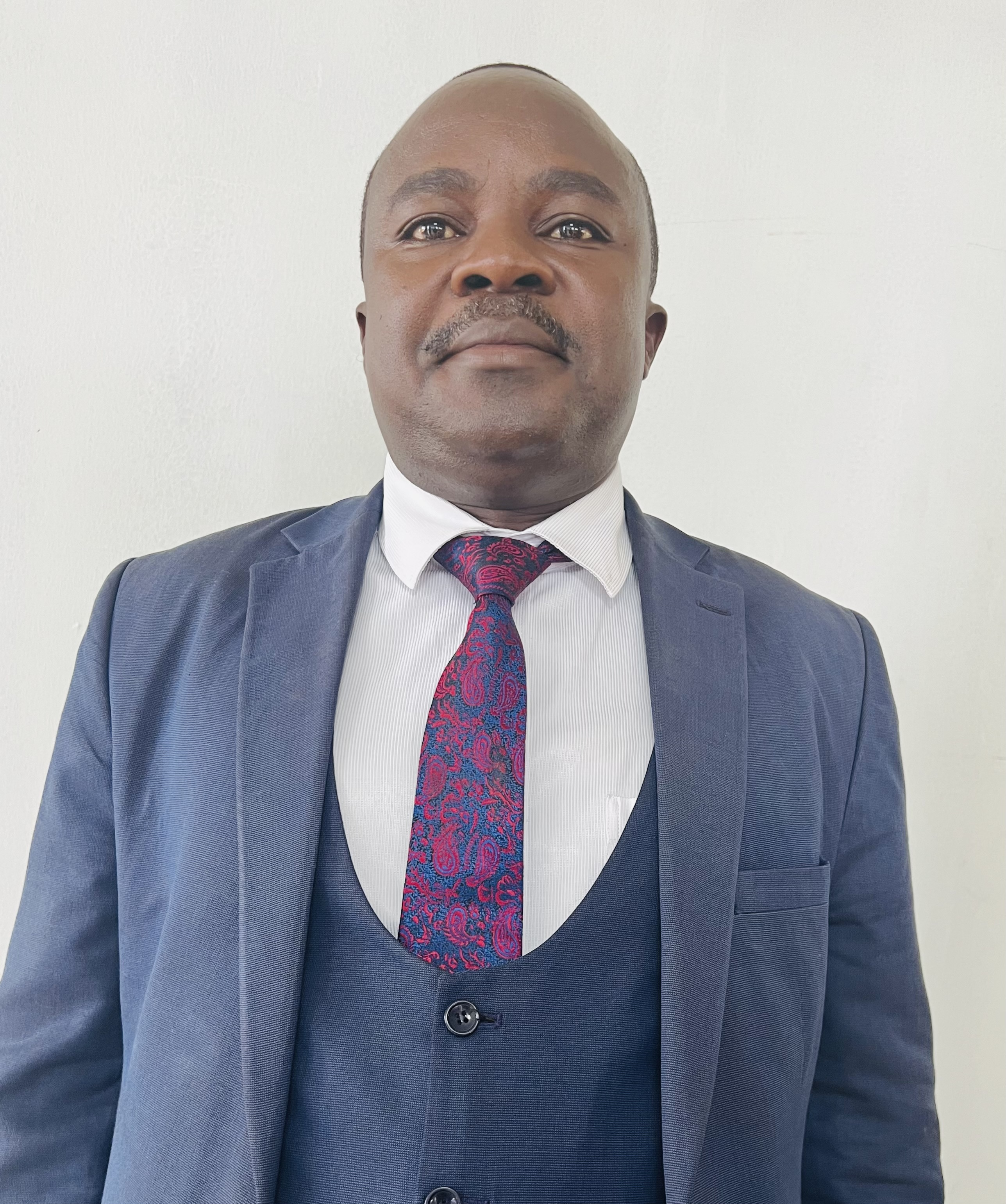

Simeo Muwanga Nsubuga is a Ugandan politician, diplomat, and human rights defender with experience in law enforcement. He is the former Mityana South Member of Parliament under the National Resistance Movement political party.

== Career ==
Nsubuga was sworn in as a Commissioner for the Uganda Human Rights Commission on Tuesday, December 20, 2022. Deputy Chief Justice Richard Butera administered the oath at the High Court Civil Division in Kampala. Nsubuga worked as a police trainer for the African Union Mission in Somalia and as a law enforcement advisor for the United Nations Development Programme (UNDP) in South Sudan. He was involved in developing various training manuals for UNDP. He was among the members of parliament who voted for the age limit bill at the Parliament of Uganda to allow President Museveni seek re-election in 2021 after reaching the mandatory 75 years age limit. He was part of the human rights committee at the Parliament of Uganda.

== See also ==
- Kipoi Tonny Nsubuga
- Evelyn Anite
- Ann Maria Nankabirwa
