= Crispin Kaheru =

Ugandan civil rights and human rights activist

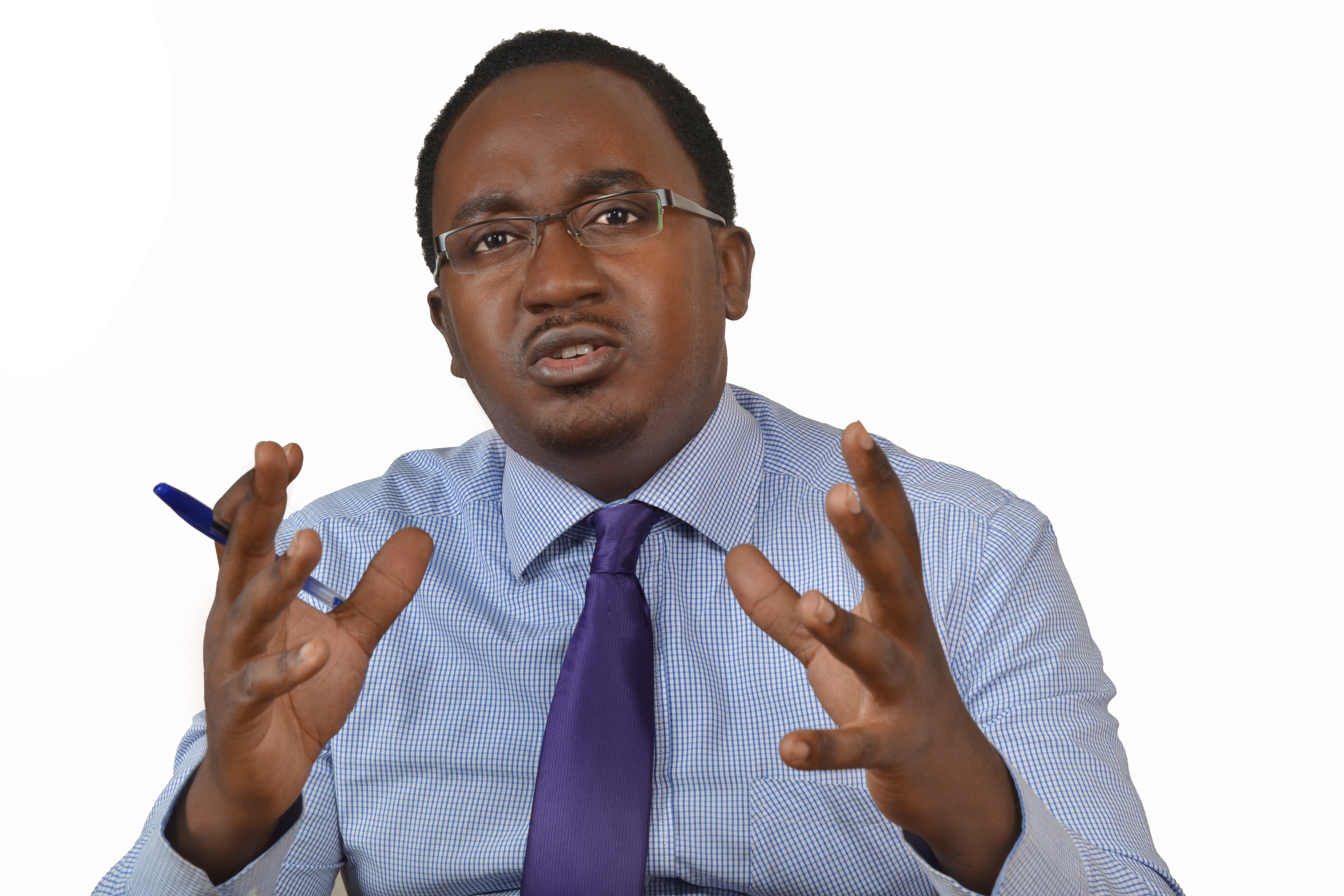
Crispin Kaheru

Crispin Kugiza Kaheru (born March 20, 1983) is a Ugandan civil rights and human rights activist, currently serving on the commission leadership as the member at Uganda Human Rights Commission.

== Education background ==
Kaheru attended primary school at Kabalega Primary School and later went to the United Kingdom, where he completed his high school education through homeschooling. He later returned and sat for his Uganda Certificate of Education at Masindi Academy. He later joined Busoga College Mwiri for his Uganda Advanced Certificate of Education. In 2005, he attained a bachelor's degree in political science from Makerere University. In 2009, he attained a Postgraduate Diploma in Peace and Security Studies from Complutense University of Madrid. In 2012, he graduated with a master's degree in Public Administration and Management from Makerere University. In 2018, he completed a course on the Practice of Problem Driven Iterative Adaptation at the John F. Kennedy School of Government. In addition to his formal education, Kaheru participated in electoral management training courses organized by the African Union's Department of Political Affairs, the European Union's Election Observation and Democracy Support, the National Democratic Institute (NDI), the International Republican Institute (IRI), and the Electoral Institute for Sustainable Democracy in Africa (EISA). In 2003, he participated in the East African Uongozi Summer Institute at the University of Dar es Salaam. In 2005, he was a member of the inaugural cohort of the British Council's Inter Action Leadership Programme.

== Personal and career history ==
He was born on March 20, 1983, in Masindi district to Micheal Stephen Kaheru and Christine Namakula Kaheru. His father was a government administrator while his mother was a teacher. His wife is Jemimah Naburri, whom he met on March 20, 2005. They have two daughters, Crystal Kaheru and Imara Kaheru.

Kaheru was the Ford Foundation Fellow in 2005, while he had started his career at the Electoral Commission of Uganda. He later joined International Republican Institute (IRI) in 2006 as a Program Assistant and was promoted to Assistant Program Officer and Program Officer at IRI's offices in Uganda, Bangladesh, Pakistan and United States between 2006 and 2009. When he returned to Uganda in 2009, he joined the Citizens’ Coalition for Electoral Democracy in Uganda (CCEDU) as the Coordinator and resigned from his position on the 11th of October, 2019 after working for nine years at CCEDU.

He is a board member of Media Focus International (MFI) since 2014, Elections Committee of the Federation of Women Lawyers of Uganda (FIDA-U) since 2014, Elections Watch Committee of the constitutional Uganda Law Society (ULS) (2015/16), Citizens’ Election Observation Network – Uganda (CEON-U) (2015/16), and Anti-Corruption Coalition of Uganda (ACCU) since 2013. In 2023, he observed Nigeria's presidential polls as an independent elections expert. He was appointed by the president of Uganda as one of the commissioners at Uganda Human Rights Commission.

== See also ==
- Rosa Malango
- Lilian Aber
- Lamex Omara Apitta
- Shifrah Lukwago
- Miria Matembe
