= Lamex Omara Apitta =

Ugandan civil servant and economist

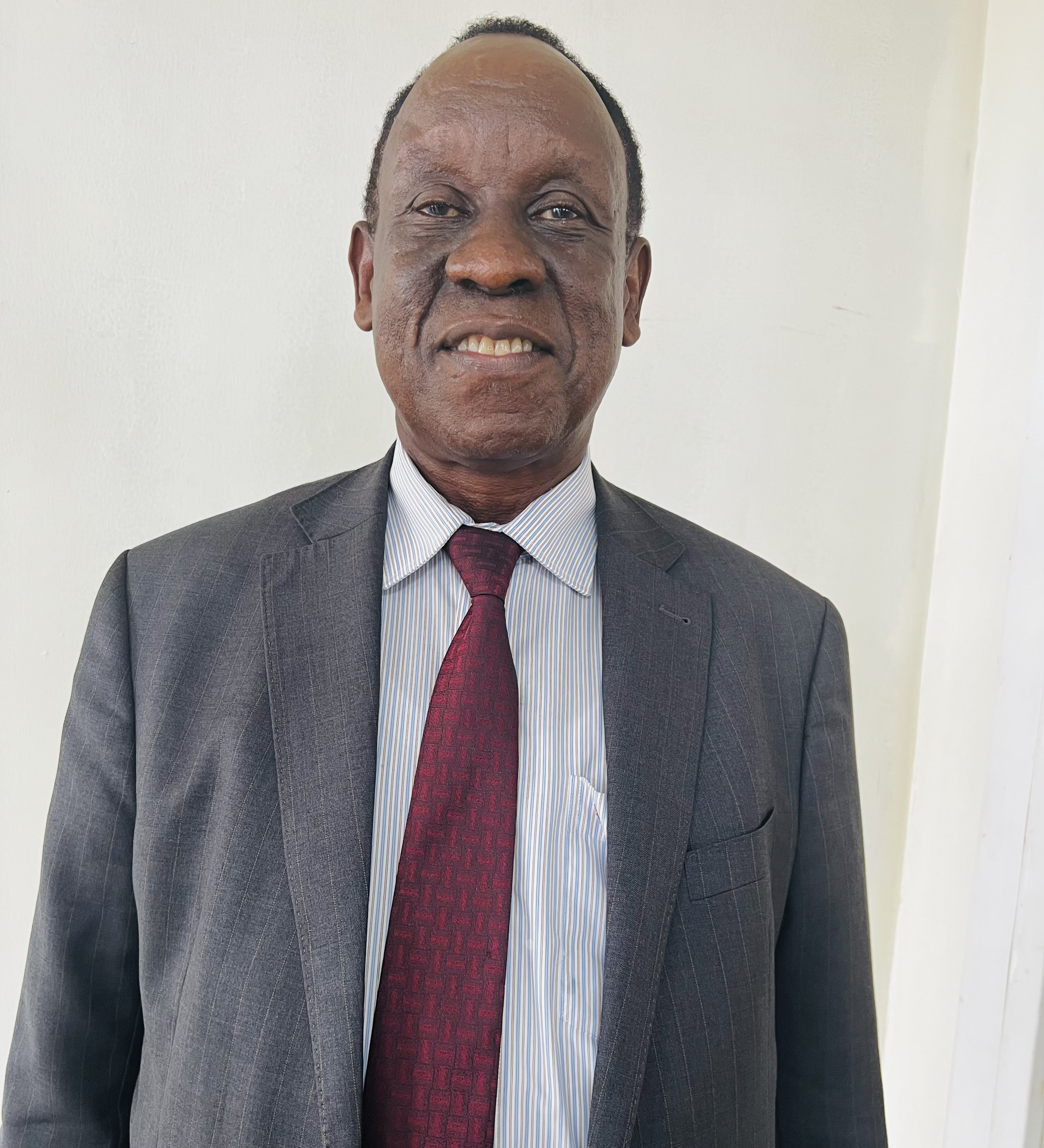
- Education: MBA; M.A. in public administration and management; postgraduate diploma in sports management
- Occupations: Civil servant; economist; policy analyst; sports administrator
- Known for: Commissioner of physical education and sports at the Ministry of Education and Sports; member of the Uganda Human Rights Commission
- Parent: Nikaroni Apitta (father)

Lamex Omara Apitta is a Ugandan civil servant, economist, policy analyst and a sports administrator/organizer. He was the commissioner of physical education and sports at the Ministry of Education and Sports. He is currently serving as a member at Uganda Human Rights Commission after his appointment by the president of Uganda.

== Personal and education background ==
His father (Nikaroni Apitta) was the founder of Boroboro Tigers FC who died in 2017. He holds an MBA, M.A in public administration and management, and a postgraduate diploma in sports management.

== Career history ==
He served as the commissioner of physical education at the Ministry of Education and Sports before resigning. He currently serves as a member at Uganda Human Rights Commission.

He has served at the Uganda Advisory Board of Trade (now defunct) as personnel officer, the Ministry of Energy and Environment Protection and established the Department of Energy Conservation as the caretaker head of the department in-the-making, and he was part of the NEAP team that worked to create the National Environment Management Authority (NEMA) for Uganda.

== See also ==
- Uganda Human Rights Commission
- Hoima Sports Stadium
- Akii Bua Stadium
- Simeo Muwanga Nsubuga
- Abubakar Muhammad Moki
