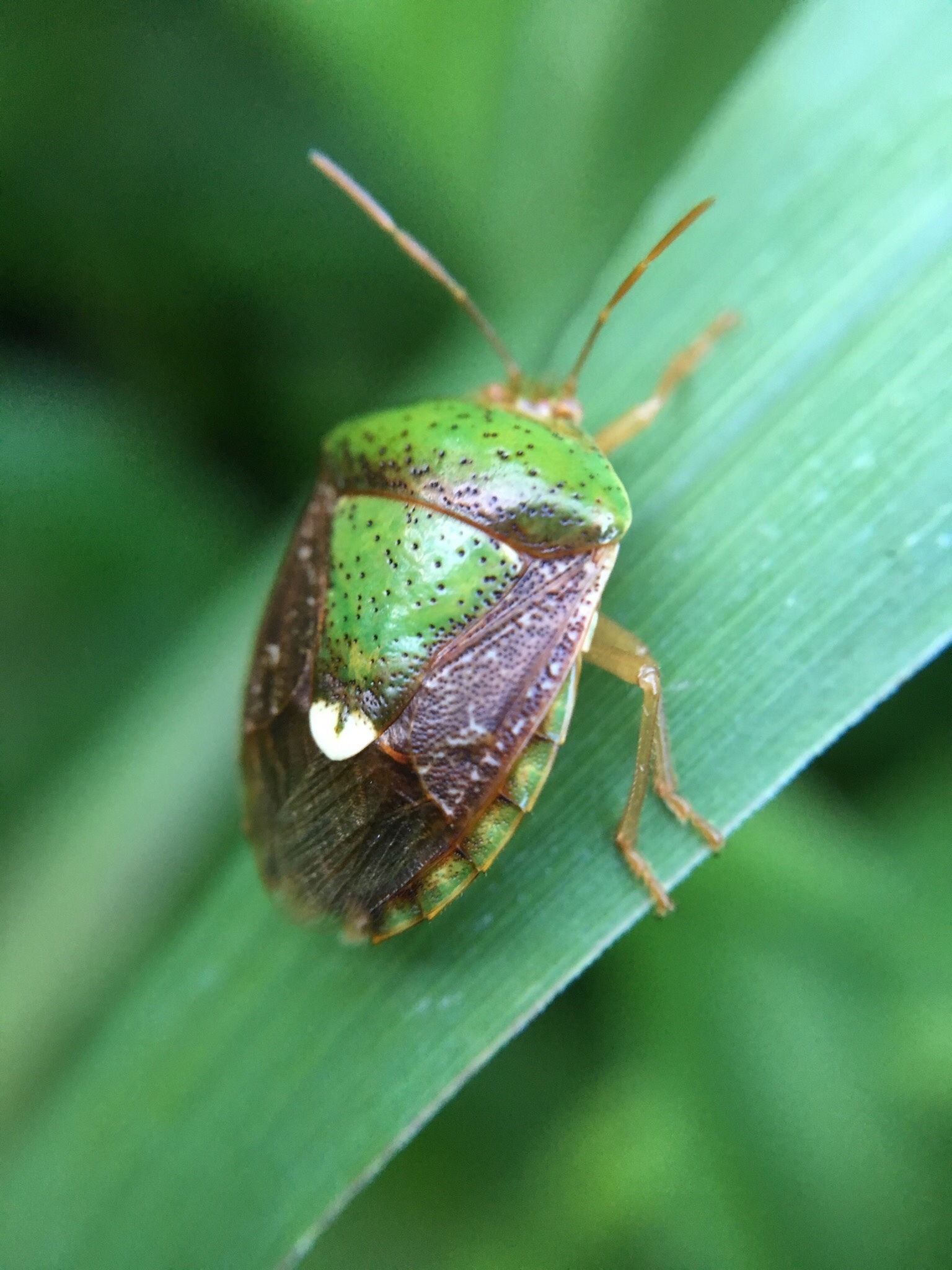

Scientific classification
- Kingdom: Animalia
- Phylum: Arthropoda
- Class: Insecta
- Order: Hemiptera
- Suborder: Heteroptera
- Family: Pentatomidae
- Genus: Edessa
- Species: E. bifida

Binomial name
- Edessa bifida (Say, 1832)

= Edessa bifida =

Species of true bug

Edessa bifida is a species of stink bug in the family Pentatomidae. It is found in the Caribbean, Central America, North America, and South America. Some have proposed elevating the preexisting subgenus Ascra to genus status, thereby reclassifying E. bifida as Ascra bifida.
