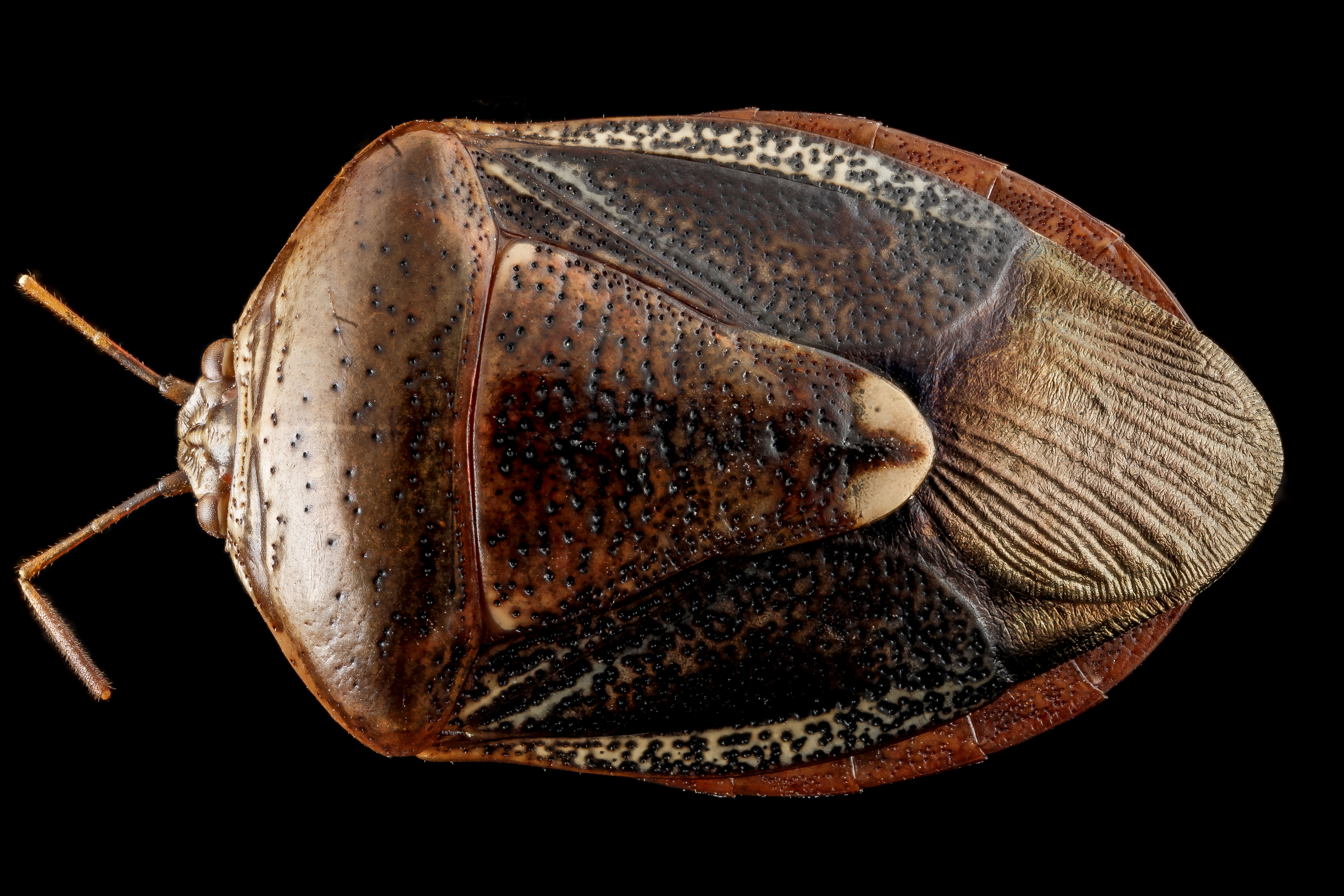

Scientific classification
- Domain: Eukaryota
- Kingdom: Animalia
- Phylum: Arthropoda
- Class: Insecta
- Order: Hemiptera
- Suborder: Heteroptera
- Family: Pentatomidae
- Genus: Edessa
- Species: E. florida

Binomial name
- Edessa florida Barber, 1935

= Edessa florida =

Species of true bug

Edessa florida is a species of stink bug in the family Pentatomidae. It is found in North America.
