= Edessa virididorsata =

Scientific classification
- Domain: Eukaryota
- Kingdom: Animalia
- Phylum: Arthropoda
- Class: Insecta
- Order: Hemiptera
- Suborder: Heteroptera
- Family: Pentatomidae
- Genus: Edessa
- Species: E. virididorsata

Binomial name
- Edessa virididorsata Silva, Fernandes & Grazia 2006

Species of insect

Edessa virididorsata is a species of stink bug within the family Pentatomidae. It is found in Colombia, Venezuela, Guyana, Surinam, French Guiana, Brazil, Paraguay, and Argentina.
