= Edessa (disambiguation) =

Edessa is the historical name of a city in Mesopotamia, now Şanlıurfa, Turkey.

Edessa may also refer to:

- Edessa (bug), a large genus of stink bugs
- Edessa, Greece
- County of Edessa, a crusader state
- Osroene, an ancient kingdom and province of the Roman Empire
- Bishopric of Edessa
- Edessa, birth name of Jarael, a character in Star Wars: Knights of the Old Republic (comics)

== See also ==
- Edosa, a moth genus
- Odessa (disambiguation)
- Odesa (disambiguation)
