= Pygoda variegata =

Scientific classification
- Kingdom: Animalia
- Phylum: Arthropoda
- Class: Insecta
- Order: Hemiptera
- Suborder: Heteroptera
- Family: Pentatomidae
- Genus: Pygoda
- Species: P. variegata

Binomial name
- Pygoda variegata Fernandes, Nascimento & Nunes, 2018

Species of stink bug

Pygoda variegata is a species of stink bug in the family Pentatomidae. It was first described in 2018 and is found in Costa Rica and Panamá. Its scientific name is in reference to the mix of brown, green and yellow of the body.
