= Tom Okurut =

Former executive director National Environment Management Authority

- Born: 6 January 1960
- Died: 14 April 2024 (aged 64)
- Citizenship: Uganda
- Education: Makerere University; University of Ibadan; IHE Delft Institute for Water Education
- Years active: 1989-2024
- Successor: Akankwasah Barirega

Tom Okia Okurut (6 January 1960 – 14 April 2024) was a Ugandan climate change activist, conservationist, environmentalist, author, and policy maker. He was the former executive director National Environment Management Authority for 10 years since 2011 to 2021, and former executive director Climate Change Action East Africa.

== Background and Education ==
Okurut attended Akadot Primary School from 1967 to 1973, Gulu High School between 1974 and 1977, Teso College Aloet from 1978 up to 1979. Okurut joined Makerere University in 1980 and graduated with a bachelor's degree of science majoring in chemistry in 1983. He obtained a post graduate diploma in renewable engineering from Eni-Sogesta Institute Urbino in Italy. Between 1987 up to 1988, he pursued his Master of Science at University of Ibadan in Nigeria, and he also attended IHE Delft Institute for Water Education in Netherlands where he did his PhD in Environmental Science and Technology from 1995 to 2000.

Okurut died on 14 April 2024 at Platinum Hospital in Nakasero, Kampala due to head clot that had reached his brain which prompted a head surgery. He died in the Intensive Care Unit due to alleged lack of oxygen circulation in the brain after the head surgery. He was buried on 20 April 2024 in Akadot village, Mukongoro subcounty in Kumi district.

== Personal life ==
Okurut was married to Ademun Anna Rose Okurut who serves as the Commissioner of Animal Health at the Ministry of Agriculture, Animal Industry and Fisheries. They had 3 children.

== Career ==
Okurut started his career as an assistant lecturer in the chemistry department at Makerere University from 1989 to 1994 after his first degree. He joined National Water and Sewage Corporation in 2000 as a Water quality officer up to 2001 in the quality, training, research and development department and he was the executive secretary for the lake Victoria Basin Commission in Kisumu, Kenya from 2006 to 2011 and he was promoted to program officer at the Lake Victoria development program, East African Community secretariat which is based in Arusha, Tanzania.

Okurut was appointed the executive director of NEMA in 2011 up to 1 September 2021 when he was succeeded by Akankwasah Barirega after serving two regimes. While at NEMA, it is alleged that he contributed to the entity success story where the entity managed to earn 500% budget increment and 100% in 5-years, lowered the pollution rate to 50% as a result of engineering innovative compliance assistant strategy, he called for the development of national guidelines and standards for workplace air quality and drafted the financial law for single plastic usage.

Okurut was the executive director of Climate Change Action for East Africa from 2021 till his death on 14 April 2024.

Okurut served as the chairperson on the Appointment Board and Council member of Makerere University Business School.

== Honor ==
In honor of Okurut's work, Anita Among requested the member of parliament to plant a minimum of five trees.

== Awards ==
Okurut was the receiver of the UNESCO - IHE Alumni award 2014 which is given to alumni of IHE Delft who have contributed exceptionally to the water management and his service as a role model to fellow water professionals.
