= Margaret Sekaggya =

Ugandan lawyer and human rights activist

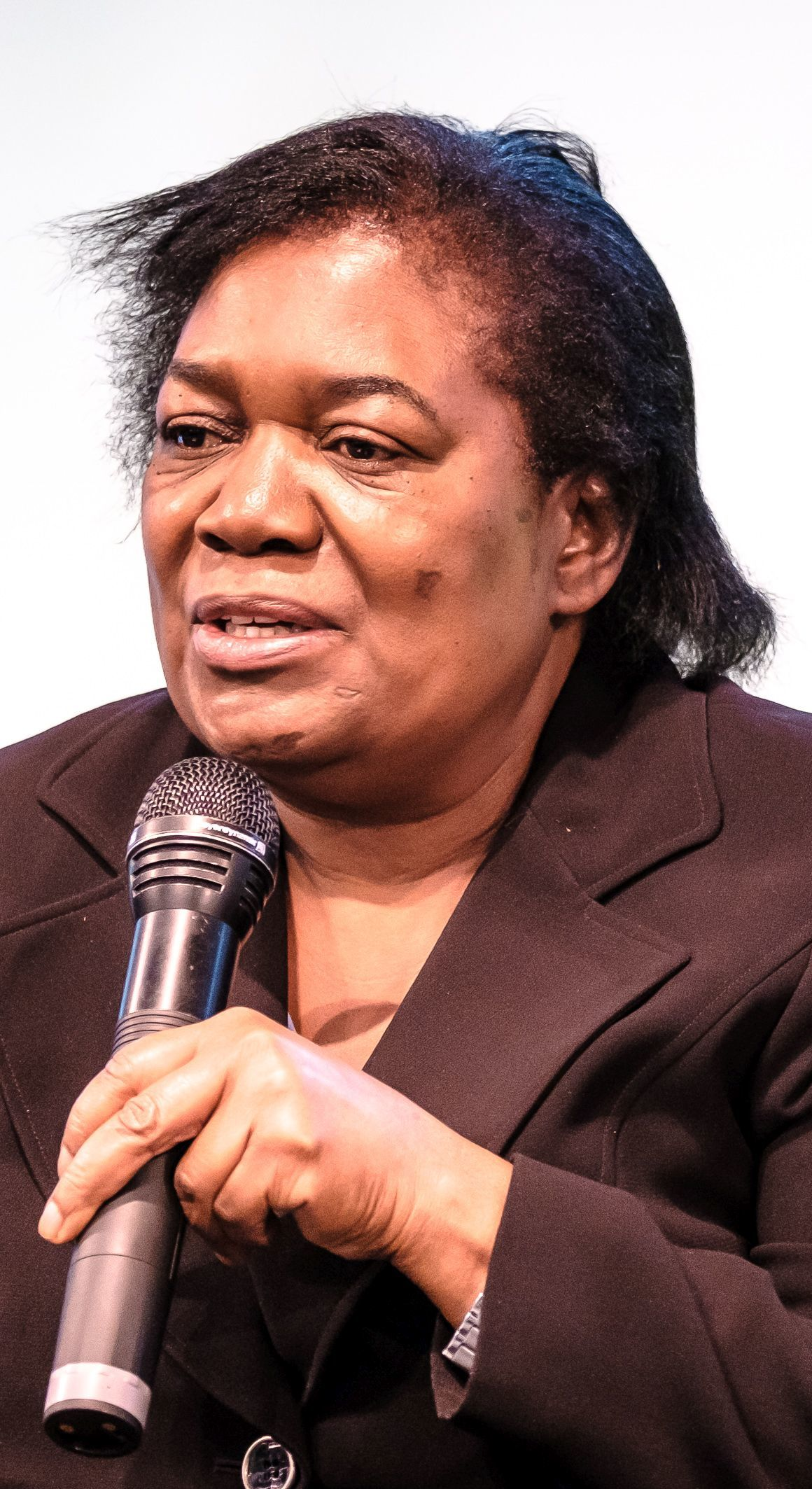

United Nations Special Rapporteur for Human Rights Defenders
- In office 2008–2014

Personal details
- Born: 23 October 1949 (age 76) Kampala, Uganda
- Education: Makerere University (LL.B.) University of Zambia (LL.M.)
- Occupation: Lawyer, Human Rights Activist

Margaret Sekaggya (born 23 October 1949) is a Ugandan lawyer and human rights activist. From 2008 to 2014, Sekaggya was the United Nations special rapporteur for human rights defenders.

She is the founder of the Human Rights and Peace Center where she served an Executive Director. She was awarded with Dorothy Ngalombi Lifetime Achievement Award in 2023 for her outstanding service and achievements as a human rights activist.

== Early life and education ==
Sekaggya was born in Kampala on 23 October 1949. In the 1960, she had her education at Old Kampala Senior School, and later Makerere College School and later joined Makerere University to pursue a bachelor of laws degree in 1970. In 1990, she attained a master of laws degree from the University of Zambia.

== Career ==
She has worked with the governments of Uganda, Zambia, and the United Nations. From 1996 to 2009, she as the chairperson for the Uganda Human Rights Commission. In 1995, she had been appointed a judge of the High Court of Uganda.

During this time, she was selected to oversee the Uganda Interim Electoral Commission. She also participated in the promulgation of the 4th Constitution of Uganda in 1995. During much of the 80s, she was based at the United Nations Institute for Namibia, readying Namibia's institutions for transition into independence. From 1978 to 1982, she was a magistrate based in Lusaka. From 2008 to 2014, Sekaggya was the United Nations special rapporteur for human rights defenders.

== See also ==
- Uganda Human Rights Commission
- Human rights in Uganda
- Human rights defenders
- Office of the United Nations High Commissioner for Human Rights
- United Nations Human Rights Council
