= Pygoda thoracica =

Scientific classification
- Kingdom: Animalia
- Phylum: Arthropoda
- Clade: Pancrustacea
- Class: Insecta
- Order: Hemiptera
- Suborder: Heteroptera
- Family: Pentatomidae
- Genus: Pygoda
- Species: P. thoracica

Binomial name
- Pygoda thoracica (Dallas, 1851)

Synonyms
- Edessa thoracica Dallas, 1851

Species of stink bug

Pygoda thoracica is a species of stink bug in the family Pentatomidae found in Ecuador. It was first described as Edessa thoracica by William Dallas in 1851 and renamed under genus Pygoda in 2018.
