= Odessa Mama =

Odessa Mama or Odesa Mama or Odessa Mame or Odesa Mame or variation. may refer to:

- "Odessa Mama" or "Odesa Mama" – a term used by the people of Odesa to lovingly refer to their city as "mother"
- "Odessa Mama" (song) or "Odesa Mama" or "Odessa Mame" or "Odesa Mame" – a popular traditional Ukrainian Yiddish song
- Odessa-mama (song; Russian: Одесса-мама), a Russian language song by Evgeny Agranovich
- Odessa-Mama, novel by Efraim Sevela, 2003
- Odessa-Mama (одесса-мама), Ukrainian TV series starring Pyotr Fyodorov, set in 1969, 2012-2013
- Odesa Mama, a 2010 art exhibition by Oleg Drozdov

== See also ==
- Odesa (disambiguation)
- Odessa (disambiguation)
- Mama (disambiguation)
- Mame (disambiguation)
