= Pygoda civilis =

Scientific classification
- Kingdom: Animalia
- Phylum: Arthropoda
- Clade: Pancrustacea
- Class: Insecta
- Order: Hemiptera
- Suborder: Heteroptera
- Family: Pentatomidae
- Genus: Pygoda
- Species: P. civilis

Binomial name
- Pygoda civilis (Breddin, 1903)

Synonyms
- Edessa civilis Breddin, 1903

Species of stink bug

Pygoda civilis is a species of stink bug in the family Pentatomidae found in Ecuador. It was first described as Edessa civilis by Gustav Breddin in 1903 and was reassigned to the genus Pygoda in 2018.
