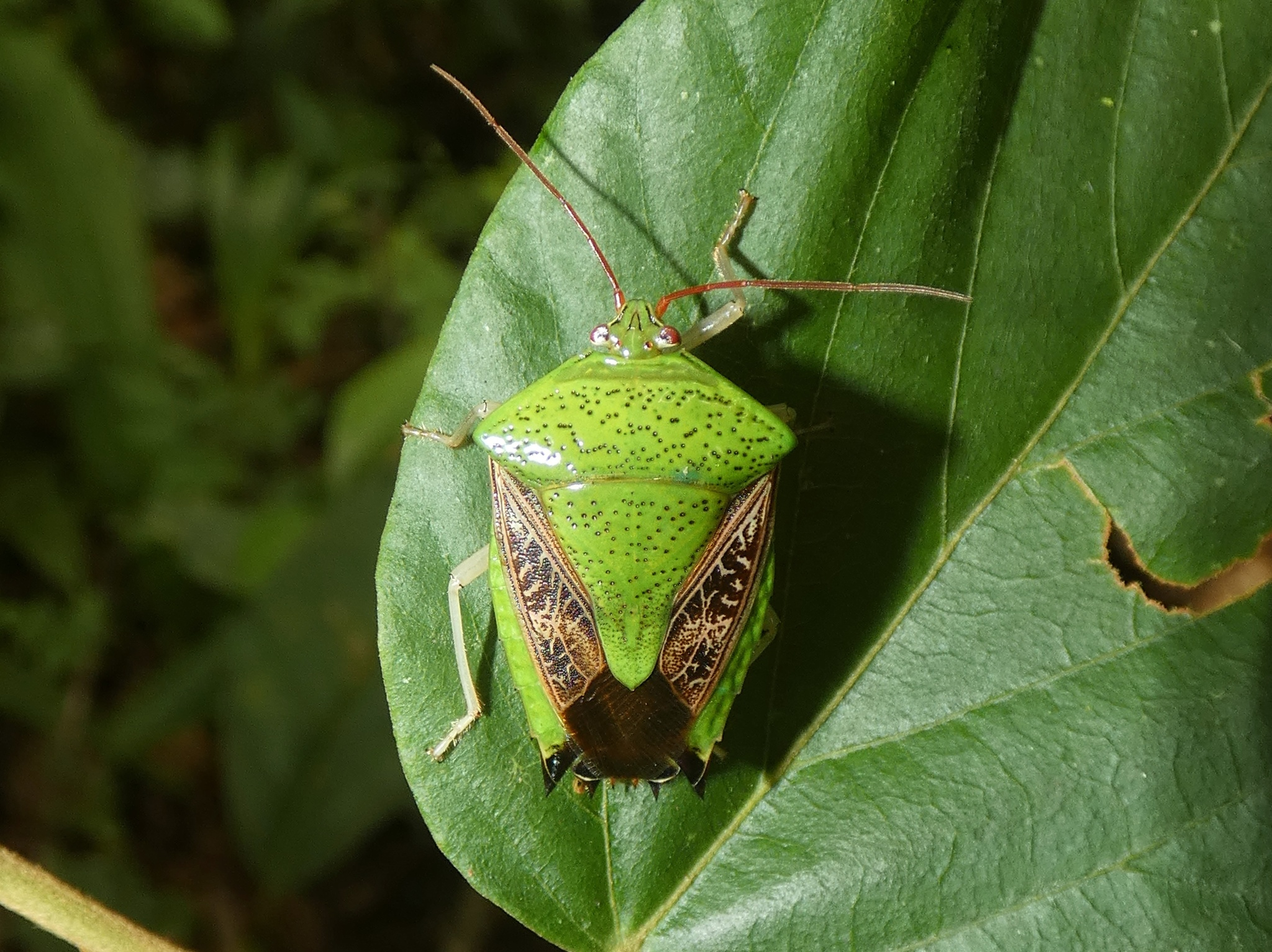
- Pygoda ramosa in Panamá

Scientific classification
- Domain: Eukaryota
- Kingdom: Animalia
- Phylum: Arthropoda
- Class: Insecta
- Order: Hemiptera
- Suborder: Heteroptera
- Family: Pentatomidae
- Genus: Pygoda
- Species: P. ramosa

Binomial name
- Pygoda ramosa Fernandes, Nascimento & Nunes, 2018

= Pygoda ramosa =

Species of stink bug

Pygoda ramosa is a species of stink bug in the family Pentatomidae. It was first described in 2018 and is found in the canal area in Panamá.

Pygoda ramosa measures between 19—21mm in length and green above. It is characterized by a pronotum and scutellum with dark brown punctuation (sparser than in P. polyta or P. irrorata). The corium has sparse small yellow stains and yellow veins and is extremely branched (which gives the species its scientific name).
