= Pygoda irrorata =

Scientific classification
- Domain: Eukaryota
- Kingdom: Animalia
- Phylum: Arthropoda
- Class: Insecta
- Order: Hemiptera
- Suborder: Heteroptera
- Family: Pentatomidae
- Genus: Pygoda
- Species: P. irrorata

Binomial name
- Pygoda irrorata (Dallas, 1851)

Synonyms
- Edessa irrorata Dallas, 1851

Species of stink bug

Pygoda irrorata is a species of stink bug in the family Pentatomidae found in South America. It was first described as Edessa irrorata by William Dallas in 1851 and renamed under genus Pygoda in 2018.
