= Pygoda expolita =

Scientific classification
- Kingdom: Animalia
- Phylum: Arthropoda
- Class: Insecta
- Order: Hemiptera
- Suborder: Heteroptera
- Family: Pentatomidae
- Genus: Pygoda
- Species: P. expolita

Binomial name
- Pygoda expolita (Distant, 1892)

Synonyms
- Edessa expolita Distant, 1892

Species of stink bug

Pygoda expolita is a species of stink bug in the family Pentatomidae found in Costa Rica and Panamá. It was first described as Edessa expolita by William Lucas Distant in 1892 and renamed under genus Pygoda in 2018.
