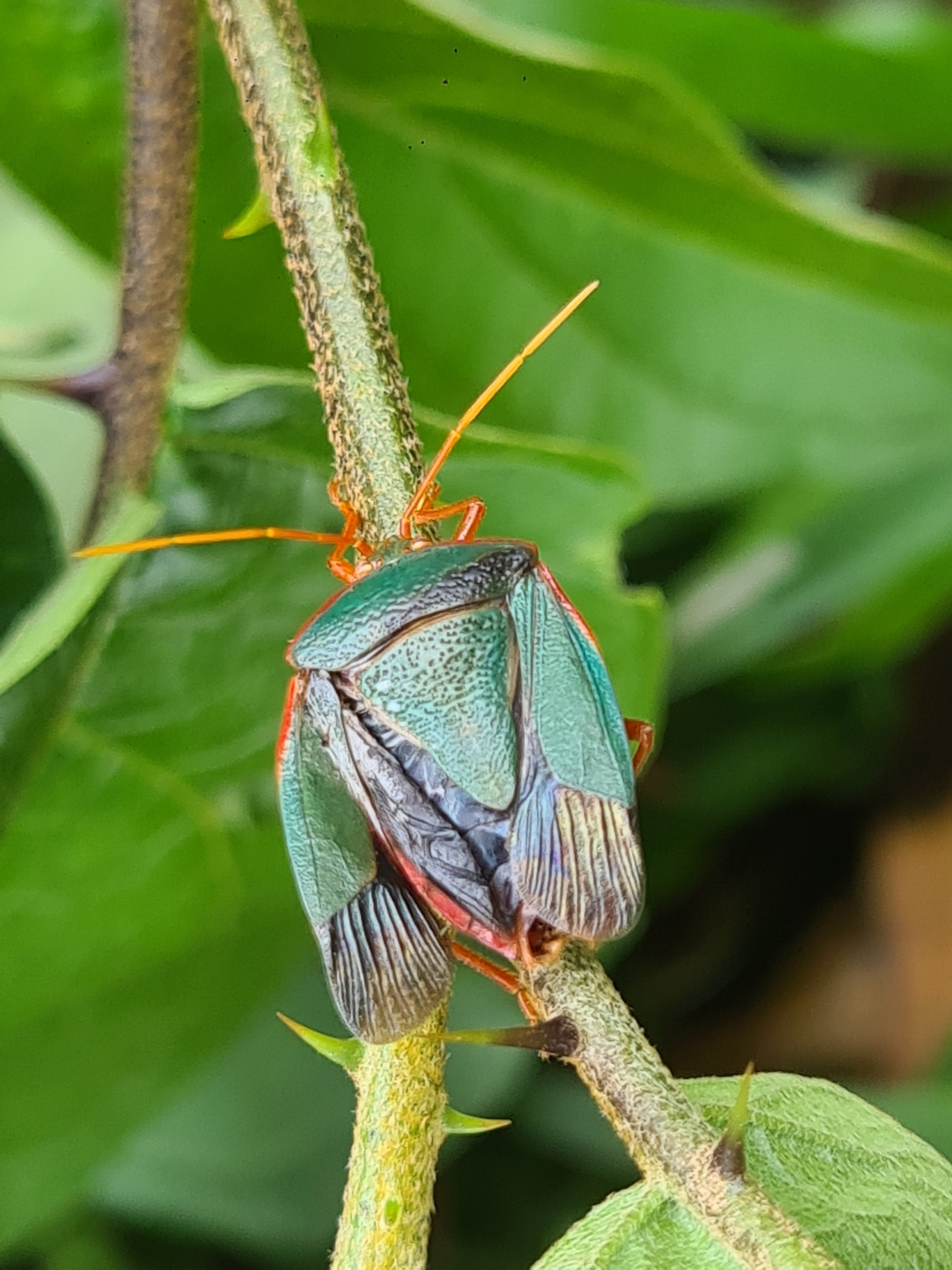

Scientific classification
- Kingdom: Animalia
- Phylum: Arthropoda
- Class: Insecta
- Order: Hemiptera
- Suborder: Heteroptera
- Family: Pentatomidae
- Genus: Edessa
- Species: E. rufomarginata

Binomial name
- Edessa rufomarginata (De Geer, 1773)

= Edessa rufomarginata =

Species of insect

Edessa rufomarginata, also known as red-bordered stink bug, is a species of stink bug. The species was originally described by Charles De Geer in 1773.

== Range ==
Edessa rufomarginata is widely distributed in Central America and South America, ranging from Mexico to Argentina.

== Ecology ==
Edessa rufomarginata is considered a secondary pest of several crops. The species can form a thread to various plants in the family Solanaceae.
