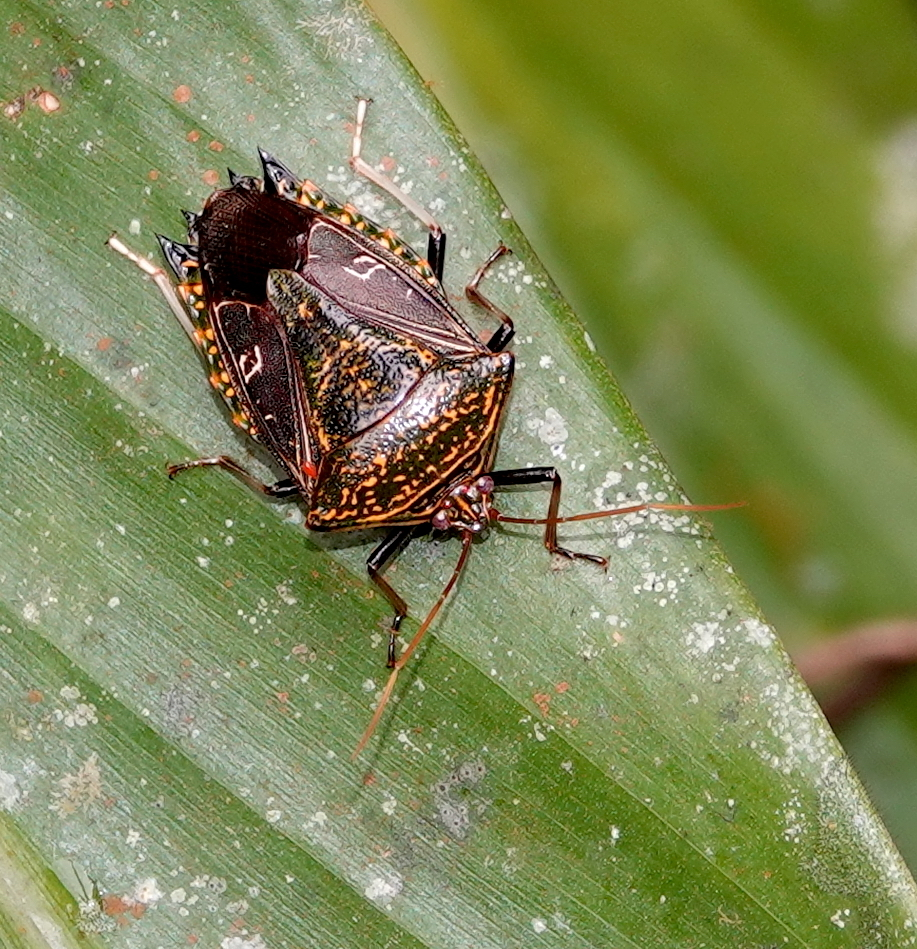

Scientific classification
- Domain: Eukaryota
- Kingdom: Animalia
- Phylum: Arthropoda
- Class: Insecta
- Order: Hemiptera
- Suborder: Heteroptera
- Family: Pentatomidae
- Genus: Pygoda
- Species: P. poecila

Binomial name
- Pygoda poecila Fernandes, Nascimento & Nunes, 2018

= Pygoda poecila =

Species of stink bug

Pygoda poecila is a species of stink bug in the family Pentatomidae. It was first described in 2018 and is found in Central America. Its scientific name is in reference to the mottled body (Greek Poikilos—mottled, varicolored, spotted).

P. poecila is larger than other Pygoda species (21–24 mm) and dark green above. Its pronotum and scutellum have brown to black punctures arranged in dark lines interspersed with irregular yellow lines or spots. Yellow veins contour the corium.
