= Pygoda amianta =

Scientific classification
- Kingdom: Animalia
- Phylum: Arthropoda
- Class: Insecta
- Order: Hemiptera
- Suborder: Heteroptera
- Family: Pentatomidae
- Genus: Pygoda
- Species: P. amianta

Binomial name
- Pygoda amianta Fernandes, Nascimento & Nunes, 2018

Species of stink bug

Pygoda amianta is a species of stink bug in the family Pentatomidae. It was first described in 2018 and is found in Costa Rica and Panamá. Its scientific name is in reference to the pure green color of the pronotum, scutellum and connexivum, without brown punctures or stains (Gr. Amiantos—pure, unspotted).
