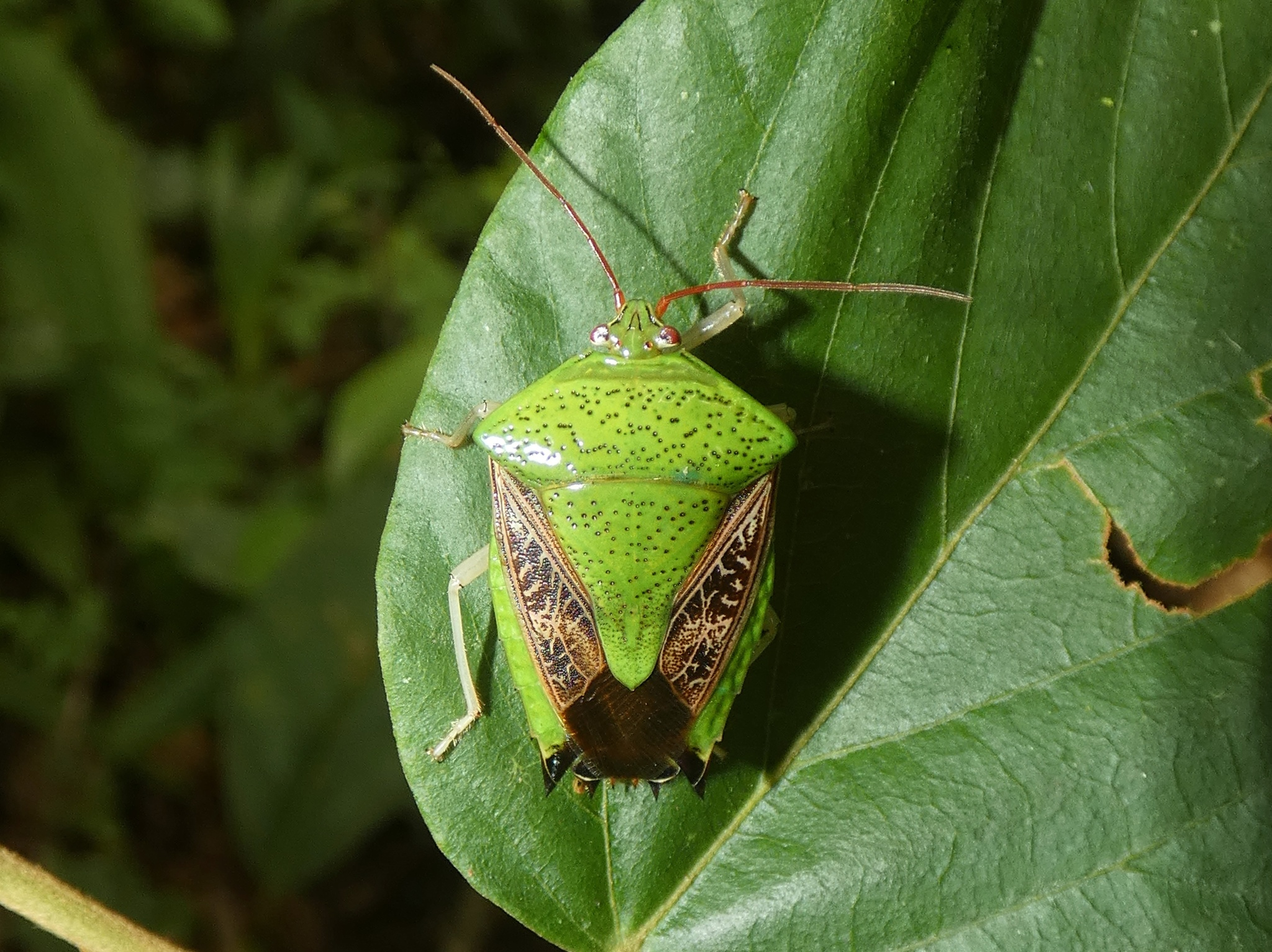
- Pygoda ramosa in Panamá

Scientific classification
- Domain: Eukaryota
- Kingdom: Animalia
- Phylum: Arthropoda
- Class: Insecta
- Order: Hemiptera
- Suborder: Heteroptera
- Family: Pentatomidae
- Subfamily: Edessinae
- Genus: Pygoda; Amyot & Serville, 1843

= Pygoda =

Genus of insects

Pygoda is a New World genus of stink bugs in the family Pentatomidae. It was formerly considered a subgenus of Edessa but was elevated to genus based on morphological traits: species grouped under Pygoda share a distinctive set of features from body, male external genitalia, and male and female internal genitalia that are very different from any other subgenus of Edessa.

== Species ==
The following species belong to the genus Pygoda:

- Pygoda amianta Fernandes, Nascimento & Nunes, 2018
- Pygoda civilis (Breddin, 1903)
- Pygoda expolita (Distant, 1892)
- Pygoda irrorata (Dallas, 1851)
- Pygoda poecila Fernandes, Nascimento & Nunes, 2018
- Pygoda polita (Lepeletier & Serville, 1825)
- Pygoda ramosa Fernandes, Nascimento & Nunes, 2018
- Pygoda thoracica (Dallas, 1851)
- Pygoda variegata Fernandes, Nascimento & Nunes, 2018
