= Odia =

Odia, also spelled Oriya or Odiya, may refer to:

- Odia people in Odisha, India
- Odia language, an Indian language, belonging to the Indo-Aryan branch of the Indo-European language family
- Odia alphabet, a writing system used for the Odia language
  - Oriya (Unicode block), a block of Odia characters in Unicode
- Odia (name), including a list of people with the name

== See also ==
- Odisha (disambiguation)
- Orissa (disambiguation)
