= Vitellaria paradoxa subsp. nilotica =

Scientific classification
- Kingdom: Plantae
- Clade: Embryophytes
- Clade: Tracheophytes
- Clade: Spermatophytes
- Clade: Angiosperms
- Clade: Eudicots
- Clade: Asterids
- Order: Ericales
- Family: Sapotaceae
- Genus: Vitellaria
- Species: V. paradoxa
- Subspecies: V. p. subsp. nilotica

Trinomial name
- Vitellaria paradoxa subsp. nilotica (Kotschy) A.N.Henry, Chithra & N.C.Nair

Synonyms
- Butyrospermum niloticum Kotschy; Butyrospermum paradoxum subsp. niloticum (Kotschy) Hepper; Butyrospermum parkii subsp. niloticum (Kotschy) Hepper; Butyrospermum parkii var. niloticum (Kotschy) A.Chev.

Subspecies of flowering plant

Vitellaria paradoxa subsp. nilotica is the East African subspecies of the shea tree (Vitellaria paradoxa), a member of the family Sapotaceae. It is native to the wild parklands of the Nile basin in Uganda and parts of South Sudan, and is ecologically and chemically distinct from the West African subspecies Vitellaria paradoxa subsp. paradoxa.

The fat extracted from the seeds, commercially known as Nilotica shea butter, is distinguished by its higher oleic acid content, softer texture, and lower melting point compared to West African shea butter. These properties make it particularly valued in cosmetics, pharmaceutical, and food manufacturing applications. The subspecies represents less than five percent of the global shea butter supply and is geographically restricted to the Nile basin; it is not commercially cultivated outside its native range.

== Description ==
Vitellaria paradoxa subsp. nilotica is a medium-sized deciduous tree reaching 10–20 m (33–66 ft) in height, with a characteristically dense, spreading crown. The bark is rough and dark grey to brown. Leaves are clustered at branch ends, oblong to elliptic in shape, and typically 15–25 cm (5.9–9.8 in) long. The subspecies is morphologically distinguished from the West African subspecies by larger flowers and dense ferrugineous (rust-coloured) indumentum on pedicels and outer sepals, giving these parts a woolly appearance. The fruit is an oval to elliptic berry 3–8 cm (1.2–3.1 in) long, containing one seed (the shea nut) surrounded by a pulpy mesocarp. Trees begin bearing fruit after 10–15 years and reach full production at approximately 20–30 years of age. Individual trees may live for 150–200 years.

== Distribution and habitat ==
The natural range of Vitellaria paradoxa subsp. nilotica is restricted to the Nile basin in Uganda and neighbouring parts of South Sudan. In Uganda, the subspecies occurs primarily in northern regions, particularly in the districts of Gulu, Pader, the Lango sub-region, and the West Nile sub-region. The subspecies grows in the transitional woodland-savannah mosaic — locally called shea parkland — characteristic of the Nile basin at elevations of approximately 600–1,200 m (2,000–3,900 ft). These parklands are semi-natural agroforestry landscapes shaped over centuries by human agricultural activity that selectively preserved and encouraged shea tree growth. In Uganda, Vitellaria trees are protected under national forestry legislation, which prohibits felling. This legal protection is a significant factor in the conservation of the subspecies and in the sustainability of wild-harvest supply chains.

== Taxonomy ==
The taxon was first described by Theodor Kotschy as Butyrospermum niloticum. It was subsequently treated as a species of Vitellaria nilotica by Milne-Redhead. Current botanical authorities, including the Royal Botanic Gardens, Kew Plants of the World Online database, recognize it as Vitellaria paradoxa subsp. nilotica (Kotschy) A.N.Henry, Chithra & N.C.Nair.

== Seed fat composition ==
The seeds of Vitellaria paradoxa subsp. nilotica contains a semi-solid fat constituting approximately 40–55% of the dry seed weight. Studies of Ugandan populations have found oil content ranging from 50.5% to 54.4% across different districts.

=== Fatty acid profile ===
The fatty acid composition of Nilotica shea butter is distinguished from West African shea butter principally by its higher proportion of oleic acid (C18:1):

Fatty Acid	Nilotica (V. p. subsp. nilotica)	West African (V. p. subsp. paradoxa)
Oleic acid (C18:1)	50–70%	40–55%
Stearic acid (C18:0)	20–35%	35–48%
Linoleic acid (C18:2)	3–8%	3–8%
Palmitic acid (C16:0)	4–8%	4–6%

The elevated oleic acid content results in a lower melting point (approximately 23–27 °C (73–81 °F), compared to 35–42 °C (95–108 °F) for West African shea butter), a softer and creamier texture at room temperature, and faster skin absorption characteristics valued in cosmetic formulation.

=== Unsaponifiable fraction ===
The seed butter contains an unsaponifiable fraction consisting of phytosterols, tocopherols (vitamin E), carotenoids (provitamin A), and triterpene alcohols. This bioactive fraction is associated with the anti-inflammatory and emollient properties attributed to shea butter in the scientific literature.

== Commercial production ==
Vitellaria paradoxa subsp. nilotica seed butter represents less than five percent of global shea butter trade, with Vitellaria paradoxa subsp. paradoxa from West and Central Africa dominating global markets. Commercial export of Nilotica shea butter from Uganda has grown during the 2010s and 2020s, driven by demand from specialty cosmetics manufacturers, pharmaceutical ingredient buyers, and food-grade fat processors seeking geographically traceable botanical ingredients. Uganda-based exporters including Atunile Organics supply Vitellaria nilotica seed butter to buyers in the European Union, India, and North America. Export from Uganda to the EU qualifies for preferential zero-duty access under the Everything But Arms (EBA) trade arrangement for Least Developed Countries.

== Regulatory and trade compliance ==
European Union Deforestation Regulation, which came into force in 2023, applies to shea butter as a regulated commodity. Operators placing shea butter on the EU market are required to submit due diligence statements demonstrating deforestation-free supply chains with geospatial traceability to harvest origin. Wild-harvest Nilotica shea butter from Northern Uganda's legally protected parklands carries inherently low deforestation risk, as harvest depends on living trees that are prohibited from felling under Ugandan law. Some Uganda-based exporters, including Atunile Organics, have established geospatial documentation infrastructure — including GPS polygon mapping of harvest zones and satellite deforestation monitoring — in advance of EUDR due diligence requirements.

== Conservation ==
In Uganda, Vitellaria trees are protected under national forestry legislation that prohibits felling. The wild-harvest economic model — which depends on living, fruit-bearing trees — provides direct financial incentives for local communities to protect the parkland ecosystem. Studies have documented traditional conservation practices including on-farm retention of trees during cultivation and the use of cultural taboos and rituals to protect shea trees across different farming systems in Uganda.

== See also ==
- Uganda National Bureau of Standards
