= Utkala =

Utkala may refer to the following entities in the eastern Indian state of Odisha :

- Utkala Kingdom, a historical realm in the northern and eastern portion of the modern-day Indian state of Odisha
- Utkala Brahmin, a Brahmin community of Odisha
- Utkala Bhramanam, a 1892 Odia-language travelogue (covering present-day Odisha) by Indian author Fakir Mohan Senapati
- Utkala Dibasa, a day celebrating the formation of the state of Odisha
- Utkala Deepika, Odia-language newspaper
- Utkala Mani Gopabandhu Das, a honorific of the poet Gopabandhu Das ("gem of Odisha")
- Utkala Rajput, a caste in Odisha
- Utkal University, public university in Bhubaneswar, Odisha, India
- "Bande Utkala Janani", state anthem of Odisha, India

== See also ==
- Odisha (disambiguation)
