= Odia (name) =

Odia is both a surname and a given name. Notable people with the name include:

- Churchill Odia (born 1985), Nigerian basketball player
- Henry Odia (born 1990), Nigerian footballer
- Odia Coates (1941–1991), American singer
