= Odra, Silesian Voivodeship =

Odra
- Village
- Coat of arms

- Location within Poland
- Coordinates: 49°58′14″N 18°19′40″E
- Country: Poland
- Voivodeship: Silesian
- County: Wodzisław
- Gmina: Gorzyce
- First mentioned: 1185

Government
  - Mayor: Ewa Mika
- Area: 3.02 km^{2} (1.17 sq mi)
- Population (2006): 391
  - Density: 129/km^{2} (335/sq mi)
- Time zone: UTC+1 (CET)
  - Summer (DST): UTC+2 (CEST)
- Car plates: SWD

Odra [ˈɔdra] is a village in Gmina Gorzyce, Wodzisław County, Silesian Voivodeship, Poland. It is situated on the Odra River.

It was first mentioned in a written document in 1185, in 1418 for the first under its current name.
