= Meddie Kaggwa =

Ugandan lawyer and human rights activist (1955–2019)

Meddie Ssozi Kaggwa
- Born: 15 April 1955; Uganda
- Died: 20 November 2019 (aged 64); Kampala, Uganda
- Citizenship: Uganda
- Education: Makerere University (Bachelor of Laws); Law Development Centre (Diploma in Legal Practice); National University of Ireland (Master of Laws)
- Occupations: Businessman, politician and corporate executive
- Years active: 1982–2019
- Known for: Management expertise
- Title: Former Chairman, Uganda Human Rights Commission

Al-Hajj Meddie Ssozi Kaggwa (15 April 1955 – 20 November 2019) was a Ugandan lawyer, businessman, politician and corporate executive, who served as the Chairman of the Uganda Human Rights Commission, from May 2009 until his death on 20 November 2019.

== Background and education ==
Kaggwa was born on 15 April 1955 in present-day Mpigi District, in the Buganda Region of Uganda. He attended local schools for his primary and secondary education. His first degree, a Bachelor of Laws, was obtained from Makerere University, Uganda's oldest and largest public university. He went on to obtain a post-graduate Diploma in Legal Practice, from the Law Development Centre, in Kampala, Uganda's capital city. He was then admitted to the Ugandan Bar. Later, he obtained a Master of Laws from the National University of Ireland, in Dublin.

== Career ==
Kaggwa had a career spanning over 30 years in positions of leadership in politics, government, management and business within Uganda. He was a Member of the Constituent Assembly that drafted the 1995 Ugandan Constitution. Kaggwa also served as the head of the department of law at the Law Development Centre. At one time he served as Minister in charge of political affairs in the Office of the President.

He represented Kawempe South Constituency in the Constituent Assembly and later representing the same constituency in the Sixth Parliament between 1996 and 2001. Kaggwa also served as secretary and head of legal services in the Arab Libyan Bank for Foreign Trade & Development, from 1984 to 1991 and as Board Secretary of the Uganda Revenue Authority for five years, from 1991 until 1996. He was a member of the Makerere University Council from 1999 to 2002 and Vice Chairperson of Kyambogo University Council and Member of Senate at the same University in 2004.

== Family ==
He was a married man and a father of five children.

== Death ==
On the morning of 20 November 2019, while driving himself to an official function, 64-year-old Meddie Kaggwa collapsed inside the vehicle, struck the vehicle in-front of his and came to a stop. Bystanders broke the window of his vehicle, administered CPR and rushed the patient to Case Medical Centre. There, efforts to resuscitate him were continued until he was pronounced dead. He was buried on 21 November 2019, at Gayaza Kasanje Village, in Mpigi Municipal Council, in Wakiso District.

== See also ==
- Ministry of Justice and Constitutional Affairs (Uganda)
