= Odessa Township =

Odessa Township may refer to:

- Odessa Township, Jewell County, Kansas
- Odessa Township, Rice County, Kansas, in Rice County, Kansas
- Odessa Township, Michigan
- Odessa Township, Big Stone County, Minnesota
- Odessa Township, Buffalo County, Nebraska
- Odessa Township, Hettinger County, North Dakota, in Hettinger County, North Dakota
- Odessa Township, Ramsey County, North Dakota, in Ramsey County, North Dakota
- Odessa Township, Edmunds County, South Dakota, in Edmunds County, South Dakota
