= Odessa (given name) =

Odessa is a unisex given name. People with the name include:

== Women ==
- Odessa A'zion (born 2000), American actress
- Odessa Chiklis (born 1999), daughter of Michael Chiklis
- Odessa Cleveland (born 1944), American actress
- Odessa Cox (1922–2001), American businesswoman
- Odessa Grady Clay (1917–1994), mother of Muhammad Ali
- Odessa Harris, (1936–2007), American blues and jazz singer
- Odessa Jorgensen, American musician known mononymously as Odessa
- Odessa Piper (born 1953), American restaurateur and chef
- Odessa Warren Grey (1883–1960), American milliner, entrepreneur, and actress
- Odessa Young (born 1998), Australian actress

== Men ==
- Odessa Sathyan (1957–2014), Indian documentary maker and activist
- Odessa Turner (born 1964), American football player

== Fictional characters ==
- Odessa Cubbage, a minor character in the game Half-Life 2
- Odessa Dobson, a character from The Spoils of Babylon
- Odessa from Into the Badlands
- Odessa (Encantadia), a character in the fantasy series Etheria
- Odessa Silverberg, a character from the video game Suikoden
