= Abubakar Muhammad Moki =

Ugandan economist and policy analyst

Commissioner for Policy Development and Capacity Building
- In office 2019–2023

Executive Director of Uganda Network of Businesses (UNB)
- Incumbent
- Assumed office 2024

Personal details
- Born: Uganda
- Education: Makerere University (Bsc(Econ), PGDE, MA(EPP), PhD)
- Occupation: Economist, Public Policy Analyst

Abubakar Muhammad Moki is a Ugandan economist and public policy analyst, currently serving as the Executive Director of the Uganda Network of Businesses (UNB). He is a retired Commissioner for Policy Development and Capacity Building in the Office of the President's Cabinet Secretariat.

== Early life and education ==
Moki has a PhD in Research on Information Attributes and Strategic Planning, a Master of Arts in Economic Policy and Planning, a Postgraduate Diploma in Education, and a Bachelor of Science in Economics from Makerere University.

== Career ==
In 2024, Moki retired as Commissioner for Policy Development and Capacity Building before being appointed as the Executive Director of the Uganda Network of Businesses (UNB).

Moki has authored works on policy analysis, including "Practical Steps in Undertaking Policy Analysis in Uganda," which outlines formal steps in policy analysis within the Ugandan context.

He has been an advocate for organic farming practices in Uganda, urging farmers to adopt organic products to improve food safety and access international markets. Dr. Moki has also participated in discussions on economic recovery strategies, emphasizing the importance of addressing land fragmentation to promote agriculture.
