= Kipoi Tonny Nsubuga =

Ugandan politician

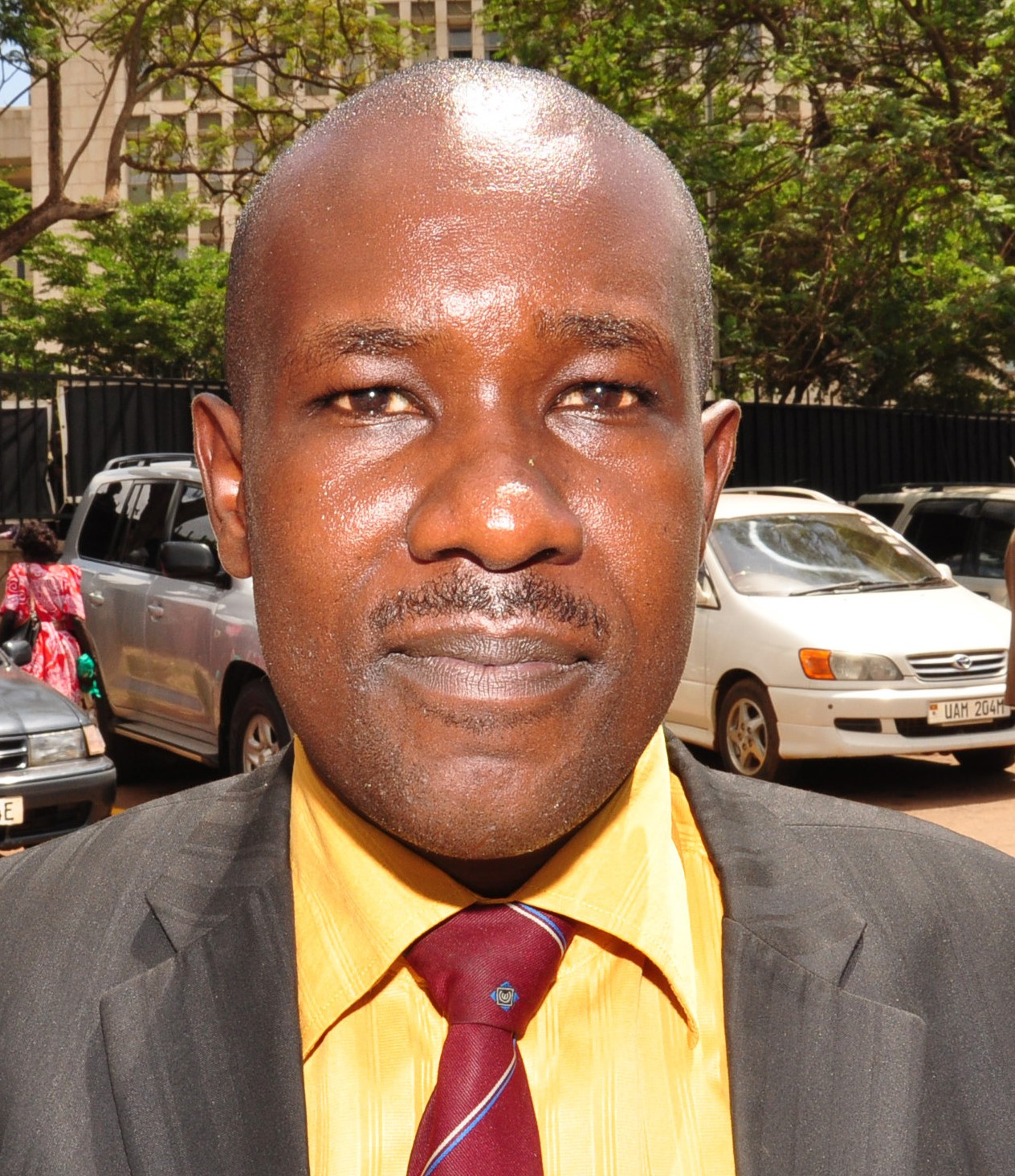
- Born: Bunefule–Bugobero sub county June 26, 1978 (age 48)
- Other name: Tony Kipoi
- Political party: National Resistance Movement

Kipoi Tonny Nsubuga (born 26 June 1978), also known as Tony Kipoi, was a member of the ninth Parliament of Uganda from 2011 until 2014, representing Bubulo West Constituency in Manafwa District. A member of the National Resistance Movement (NRM), he was elected with 72% of the vote. As of April 2018, he is facing a court martial for treason, among other charges.

== Member of parliament ==
Kipoi was inaugurated as the Member of Parliament of Bubulo West on 17 May 2011, after defeating incumbent Fred Bukeni, former minister Wanzusi Wasieba and others in the NRM primaries. He survived an immediate challenge to his election brought by 800 petitioners, with the Court of Appeal setting aside an order for a by-election made by the High Court. At the time of his election, Kipoi was the youngest directly-elected member of parliament at the age of 32.

Kipoi served on the Committee of Defense and Internal Affairs and Committee on Commissions, Statutory Authorities and State Enterprises (COSASE).

== Treason charges ==
Kipoi was arrested in December 2012 and charged with treason on the grounds that he was recruiting personnel from Uganda as well as Congolese rebels as the basis for a potential coup. In June 2013, he was arrested separately on charges of car theft, before apparently fleeing to the Democratic Republic of the Congo (DRC) while on bail. The treason charges were withdrawn in February 2014, with proceedings transferred to a court martial. He was reported to have been arrested in the DRC in November 2013, but accorded "guest-of-the-state" status. He was then rearrested in February 2014 following an extradition request from Uganda, but as of November 2014 had not been transferred to Ugandan custody. In February 2018, Kipoi was arrested in Botswana, charged with four counts of obtaining money by false pretences and extradited to Uganda in early March.

== Expulsion from parliament ==
In February 2014, Kipoi was expelled from Parliament for missing 15 sittings without a convincing explanation.
