= Orissi =

Orissi, also spelled Odissi (Odia: ଓଡ଼ିଶୀ oṛiśī) is an adjectival form of Odisha. It may refer to:

- Odissi dance, the classical dance of Odisha
- Orissi music, the classical music of Odisha
- other aspects of Orissi culture
- a person from Odisha
