= Orisha (disambiguation) =

Orisha is a divine spirit of the Yoruba religion.

Orisha or Orisa may also refer to:

- Orishas (band), a Cuban hip-hop/Latino fusion band
- Orishas (comics), a pantheon of elemental Yoruba deities published by DC Comics
- Odisha, a state located on the eastern coast of India
- Orisa (Overwatch), a character from the 2016 video game
- River Orisa, a river in North Central Nigeria.

== See also ==
- Odisha (disambiguation)
