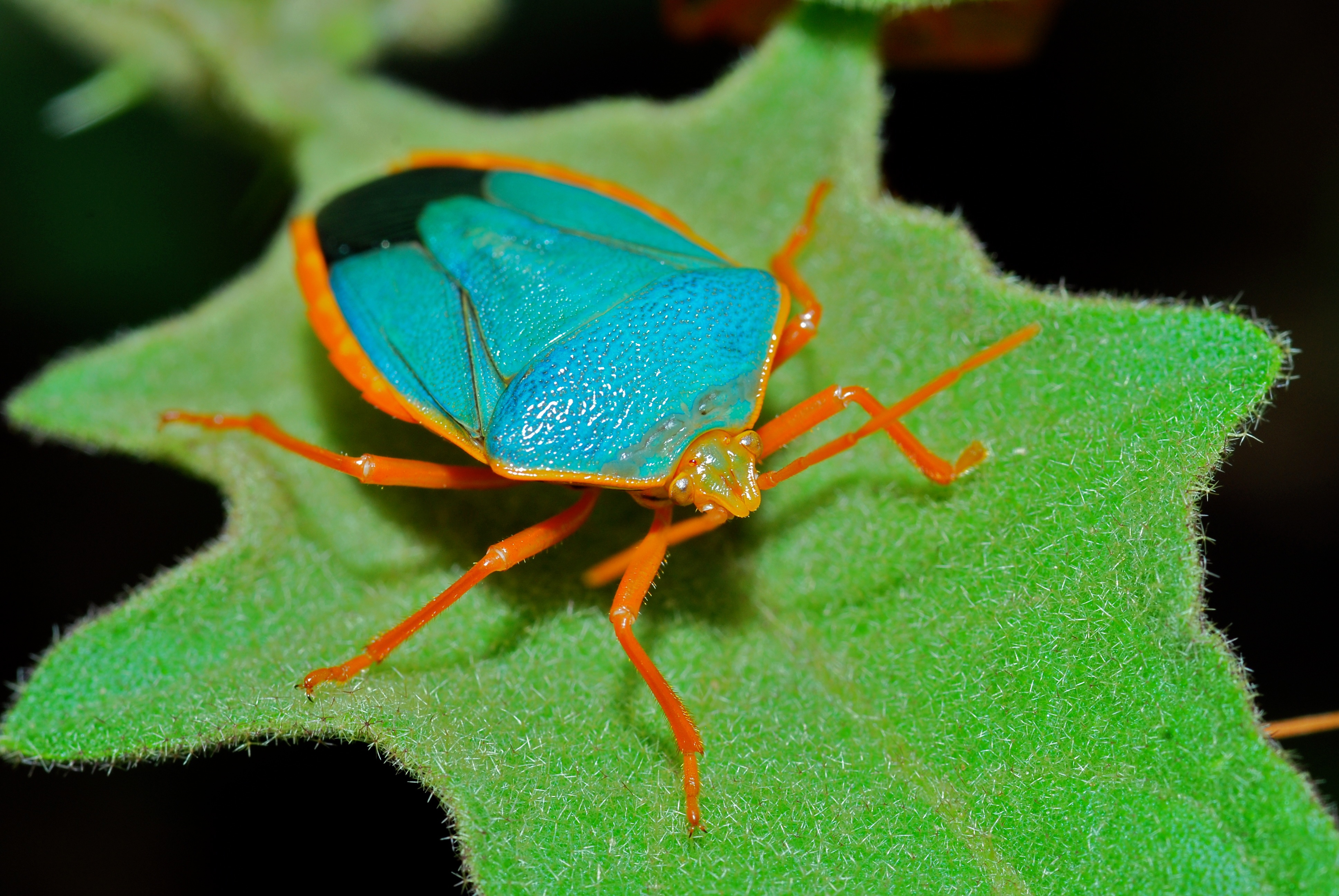
- Edessa rufomarginata

Scientific classification
- Kingdom: Animalia
- Phylum: Arthropoda
- Class: Insecta
- Order: Hemiptera
- Suborder: Heteroptera
- Family: Pentatomidae
- Subfamily: Edessinae
- Genus: Edessa; Fabricius, 1803

Synonyms
- Aceratodes Amyot & Serville, 1843; Dorypleura Amyot & Serville, 1843; Hypoxys Amyot & Serville, 1843; Pygoda Amyot & Serville, 1843

= Edessa (bug) =

Genus of insects

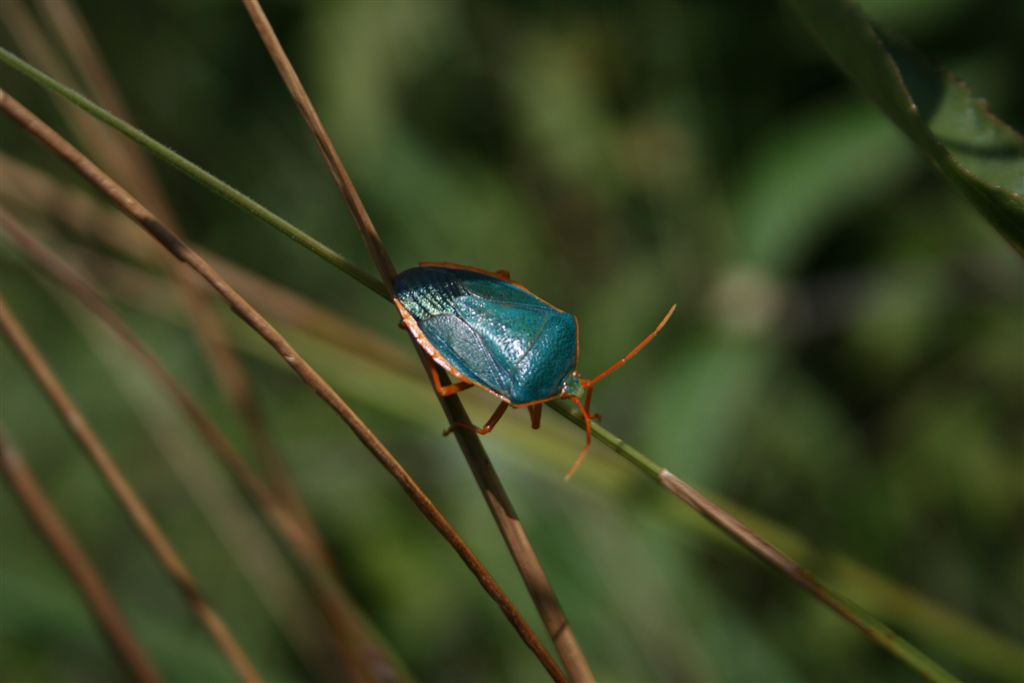
Edessa rufomarginata

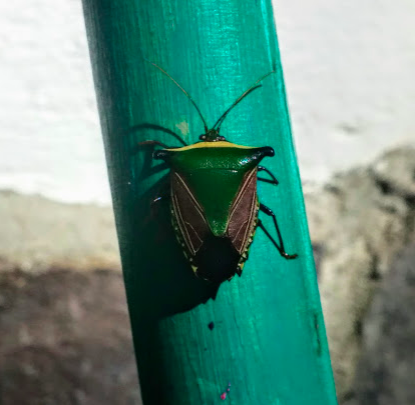
Edessa pictiventris

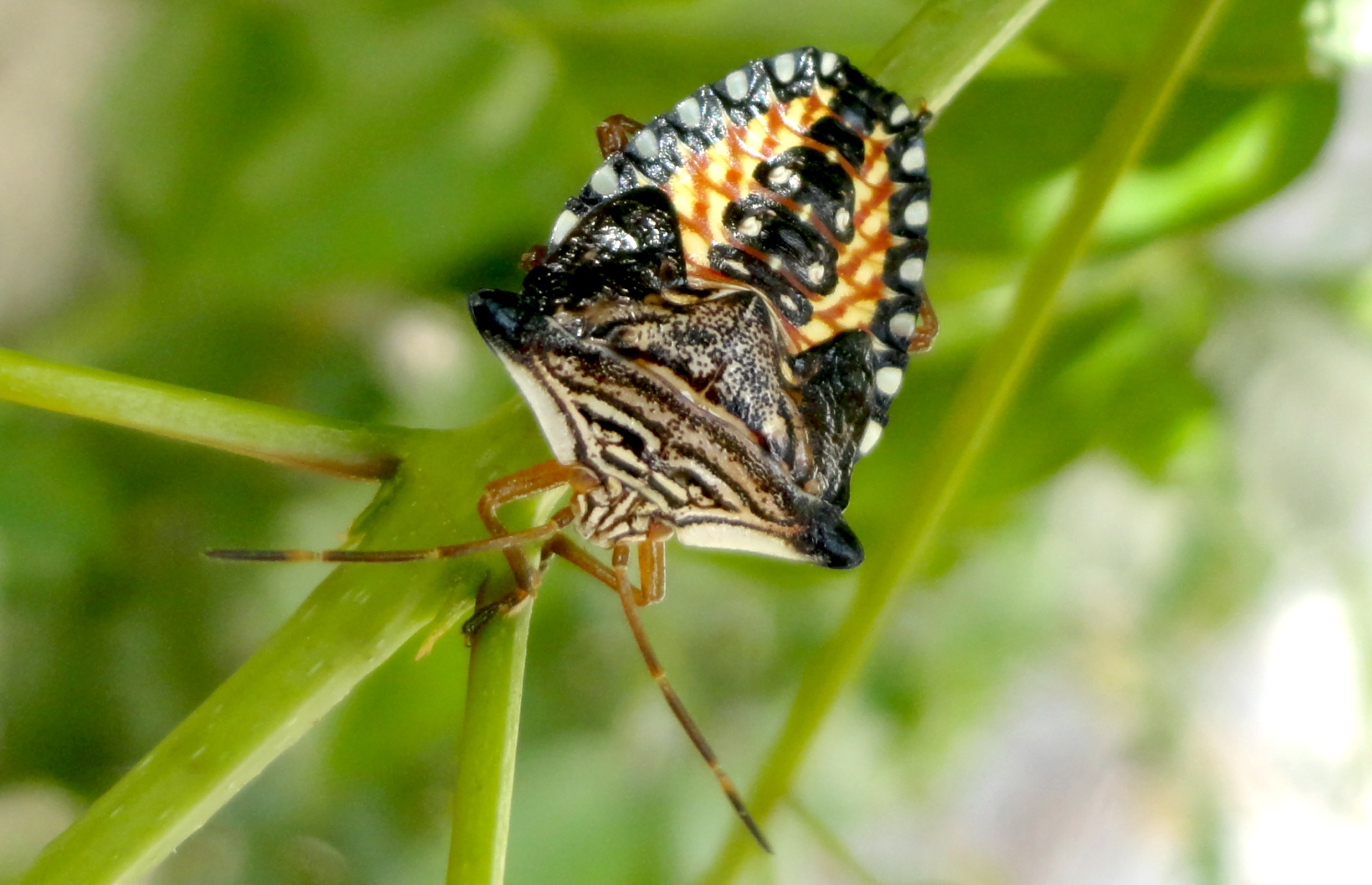
Edessa reticulata

Edessa is a large New World genus of stink bugs in the family Pentatomidae, containing over 250 described species. Several other genera used to be included until recently, such as Pygoda, Ascra, Paraedessa, Doesburgedessa and others.

== Species ==
These species belong to the genus Edessa. Hundreds more species of Edessa populate the Neotropics.

- Edessa abdominalis Erichson, 1848^{g}
- Edessa affinis Dallas, 1851^{g}
- Edessa amazonica Fernandes & van Doesburg, 2000^{g}
- Edessa angusticlada^{g}
- Edessa antilope Fabricius, 1803^{g}
- Edessa bifida (Say, 1832)^{i c g b}
- Edessa bilunulata Breddin, 1901^{g}
- Edessa brasiliensis^{g}
- Edessa bubala (Lepeletier de Saint Fargeau & Audinet-Serville, 1825)^{g}
- Edessa castaneolineata^{g}
- Edessa cervus (Fabricius, 1787)^{i c g}
- Edessa costaricensis Silva & Fernandes, 2012^{z}
- Edessa dolichocera (Lichtenstein, 1795)^{g}
- Edessa dolosa Breddin, 1907^{g}
- Edessa elongatispina^{g}
- Edessa eucnema^{g}
- Edessa exigusternata^{g}
- Edessa flavinervis Stål, 1872^{g}
- Edessa florida Barber, 1935^{i c g b}
- Edessa godmani Distant, 1881^{g}
- Edessa guyanensis Fernandes & van Doesburg, 2000^{g}
- Edessa helix Erichson, 1848^{z}
- Edessa inclyta Walker, 1868^{g}
- Edessa infulata Breddin, 1904^{g}
- Edessa irrorata Dallas, 1851^{g}
- Edessa jugalis Breddin, 1907^{g}
- Edessa jugata (Westwood, 1837)^{g}
- Edessa laticornis Stål, 1872^{g}
- Edessa lineata Westwood, 1837^{g}
- Edessa lineigera Bergroth, 1891^{g}
- Edessa luteomaculata Santos & Fernandes^{g}
- Edessa meditabunda (Fabricius, 1794)^{g}
- Edessa melacantha Dallas, 1851^{g}
- Edessa metallica^{g}
- Edessa metata Distant, 1890^{g}
- Edessa miniata Westwood, 1837^{g}
- Edessa nigridorsata Santos & Fernandes^{g}
- Edessa nigriventris Santos & Fernandes^{g}
- Edessa oxyacantha Breddin, 1904^{g}
- Edessa picticornis Stål, 1872^{g}
- Edessa pictiventris Stål, 1872^{z}
- Edessa praecellens Stål, 1862^{g}
- Edessa preclara^{g}
- Edessa pudibunda Stål, 1862^{g}
- Edessa punctata Santos & Fernandes^{g}
- Edessa rufipes (Fallou, 1888)^{g}
- Edessa rufomarginata (De Geer, 1773)^{g}
- Edessa rugulata^{g}
- Edessa satrapa Breddin, 1901^{g}
- Edessa scutellata Herrich-Schäffer, 1840^{g}
- Edessa splendens^{g}
- Edessa stolida (Linnaeus, 1758)^{g}
- Edessa trabeata Burmeister, 1835^{g}
- Edessa trabecula Breddin, 1907^{g}
- Edessa ura Erichson, 1848^{g}
- Edessa virididorsata Silva, Fernandes & Grazia 2006^{g}
- Edessa viridula^{g}
- Edessa vitula (Fabricius, 1803)^{g}

Data sources: i = ITIS, c = Catalogue of Life, g = GBIF, b = Bugguide.net z = Zootaxa
