= National Environment Management Authority of Kenya =

- Formation: 2002
- Headquarters: Nairobi, Kenya
- Director General: Mr. Mamo Boru Mamo.
- Deputy Director of Programmes and Partnerships: Ms. Anne Nyatichi Omambia
- Deputy NIE/AE Coordinator: Mr. John Wakhungu Wafula

The National Environment Management Authority (NEMA) is the Kenyan government agency responsible for the management of the environment and environmental policy. It is a Semi-Autonomous Government Agency (SAGA) within the Ministry of Environment and Forestry. The Authority works closely with international organizations such as UNEP, UNDP, and DANIDA. Since its establishment, NEMA has implemented three strategic plans to improve the environmental landscape of Kenya.

== Constitutional Framework ==
The Kenyan Constitution has provisions for the conservation and utilization of its natural resources. The Environmental Management and Coordination Act No. 8 of 1999 (EMCA) creates the National Environmental Management Authority (NEMA) to issue guidelines for the sustainable management and utilisation of the state's resources for the benefit of citizens. The EMCA makes the following provisions for NEMA's operations:

- NEMA must participate in environmental education and public awareness
- NEMA must establish Direct Environment and Provincial Committees that are to create environmental action plans for their areas of jurisdiction
- NEMA must take measures to ensure biological diversity
- NEMA must acquire consent of their Director General to initiate certain projects
- NEMA must be investigated for allegations and grievances by a Public Complaints Committee (PCC)
- NEMA's committee responsible for formulation of an action plan, the National Environmental Action Plan Committee (NEAPC), must submit a plan every five years to be approved by Parliament
- NEMA must issue restoration orders to those parties who have damaged the environmental landscape with their development projects
- NEMA must be advised by the Standards and Enforcement Review Committee (SERC) on the establishment and regulation of environmental quality standards
- NEMA must distribute licenses for any and all activities that could damage the state's environment
- NEMA must provide alternate environmental management instructions, audits, and monitoring
- NEMA must establish environmental inspectors that can prosecute and monitor compliance with environmental law

== EIA/Access Permits ==
All projects must submit an Environmental Impact Assessment (EIA) to NEMA for an access permit, and these projects will be later evaluated to ensure they are complying with guidelines proposed within the EIA. Experts responsible for the analysis of EIA plans are registered by NEMA. NEMA has an institutional framework to assist in the access permit process. For an application to be considered complete, it must contain the following:

- Signatures of authorized persons
- Proof of payment
- Comprehensive project proposal
- Research permit through the National Commission for Science, Technology, and Innovation (NACOSTI)
- Signed prior informed consent and mutually agreed terms – accompanied by minutes of meetings
- Copies of IDs or passports
- Soft copy of the application
- CVs of persons involved in project
- Institution/corporate/company profile
- Financial support evidence
- Signed material transfer agreement
- Memorandum of understanding/agreement if working in collaboration

When complete applications are submitted to NEMA, notification of the application is posted in the Kenya Gazette and newspaper. An Issuance of Records of Decision of the Authority is then within 60 days of receipt of application based upon the determination of the review made by the Access Benefit Sharing (ABS) Technical Committee of NEMA. There are three decisions that can be made by the Authority:

1. Approval - renewable access permit is for one year is granted
2. Pend Approval - the access permit processing time is paused until issues have been resolved to the satisfaction of the Authority
3. Rejection - access permit is denied due to provided reasons

== Committees of NEMA ==
=== Access Benefit Sharing (ABS) Technical Committee ===
The ABS Technical Committee is a multi-sectoral group within NEMA that provides a broad range of expertise and perspectives to contribute to fair and objective decisions. They are responsible for the decisions made regarding access permit applications and they assist in the implementation of prior informed consent, material transfer agreements, and mutually agreed terms. The composition of the ABS Technical Committee is as follows:

- Ministry of Environment and Mineral Resources (MEMR)
- National Environment Management Authority (NEMA)
- National Council for Science and Technology (NCST)
- Kenya Industrial Property Institute (KIPI)
- Kenya Wildlife Service (KWS)
- Kenya Forest Service (KFS)
- Kenya Plant Health Inspectorate Service (KEPHIS)
- Kenya Agricultural Research Institute (KARI)
- National Museums of Kenya (NMK)
- Kenya Medical Research Institute (KEMRI)
- Indigenous Information Network (IIN)

=== Kenya Private Sector Alliance (KEPSA) ===
The Kenya Private Sector Alliance (KEPSA), an umbrella organization seeking accountability for the private sector representatives within the National Environment Committee (NEC), has an environmental sector committee that is responsible for engagement with NEMA on behalf of its members.

=== The National Environmental Tribunal (NET) ===
The National Environmental Tribunal (NET) is a judicial power that resolves disputes resulting from the administrative decisions of NEMA. The NET is responsible for training the 47 county governments of Kenya in environmental literacy, but they lack original jurisdiction. They work in cooperation with NEMA to raise environmental awareness among professional groups through workshops. The Tribunal became operational in 2002 and their fundamental role within the government was secured when they participated in the induction of the judges of the Environmental and Land Court (E&LC). The Tribunal has five members:

1. Chair - qualified as a judge if the High Court and nominated by the Judicial Service Committee
2. Advocate nominated by the Law Society of Kenya
3. Environmental lawyer from academia
4. Expert with competence in environmental management - nominated by the Minister (Cabinet Secretary)
5. Expert with competence in environmental management - nominated by the Minister (Cabinet Secretary)

== Accreditation ==
NEMA was accredited by the Green Climate Fund (GCF) in March 2016. Their entity within the GCF, ending in April 2026, is classified as micro, it meets the Category B standard for environment and social risk, and it meets the Basic and Project Management guidance standards. They use their GCF accreditation to work towards “Kenya 2030,” a plan detailing strategies of climate change action and green growth to mitigate greenhouse gas emissions by 2030. They have implemented climate change mitigation and resilience projects ranging from US$10 million to US$255 million.

NEMA has also been accredited by the Adaptation Fund since March 2012. They were re-accredited in May 2019 and May 2021.
