= National Environment Management Authority of Uganda =

Government agency

Coordinates: 00°18′51″N 32°35′24″E

Agency overview
- Formed: 1995 (age 30–31)
- Jurisdiction: Government of Uganda
- Headquarters: NEMA House, 17/19/21 Jinja Road, Kampala, Uganda
- Employees: 111 (2018)
- Agency executives: Chairperson of Board of directors, [Prof James Okot-Okum]; Executive Director, Dr Barirega Akankwasah
- Parent agency: Uganda Ministry of Water and Environment
- Website: Homepage

The National Environment Management Authority of Uganda (NEMA), is a government agency responsible for the monitoring, coordinating, supervising and regulating the natural environment and the environmental policy of Uganda. NEMA advises the government of Uganda and spearheads the development of environmental policies, regulations, laws, guidelines and standards.

== Location ==
The headquarters of NEMA are located at 17/19/21 Jinja Road, in the Central Division of the city of Kampala, Uganda's capital and largest city. The geographical coordinates of the NEMA headquarters are: 00°18'51.0"N, 32°35'24.0"E (Longitude:0.314167; Latitude:32.590000). 6634872987545

== Overview ==
NEMA was established in May 1995 under the National Environment Act Cap 153 and became operational in December 1995. It is administered under the Uganda Ministry of Water and Environment.

== Governance ==
The agency is supervised by a nine-person board of directors, headed by a chairperson, currentlyProf. James Okot-Okumu. Other members of the board include Pricilla Nyandoi, Charles Ekure, Florence Grace Adongo, Katwiremu Yorokamu Bategana, Christine Mayengo, Can Amos Lapenga, Jimmy Chemonges Kuka and Barirega Akankwasah. Barirega Akankwasah serves as the Executive Director & Board Secretary. This Board of Directors for the National Environment Management Authority (NEMA) was inaugurated on May 31, 2021, and they hold office for a tenure of three years.

== See also ==
- Environmental management
- National Environment Management Authority of Kenya
