= Uganda Human Rights Commission =

Ugandan government agency

- UHRC

Agency overview
- Formed: 1 July 1995; 31 years ago
- Headquarters: 4929 Buganda Road; Kampala, Uganda
- Agency executive: Vacant, Chairman
- Website: Homepage

The Uganda Human Rights Commission (UHRC) serves to monitor and advance human rights in Uganda. The UHRC is a body established under the 1995 Constitution Article 51 under the Bill of Rights found in Chapter four of the Constitution. It is based on the Paris Principles which are the guidelines for the establishment of a national human rights institution. Its mandate is spelled out in Article 52 of the Constitution.

== Location ==
The national headquarters of UHRC are located at 4929 Buganda Road, on Nakasero Hill, in Kampala, Uganda's capital and largest city.

== Composition ==
The Commission is composed of a Chairperson, and not less than three other persons, appointed by the President with the approval of Parliament. As of 2009, there were seven commissioners. The Chairperson at that time was the late Meddie Kaggwa (1955–2019). Members of the Commission have to be persons of high moral character and proven integrity, although Commissioner Jacklet Atuhaire has been accused of attempted murder and chairlady Wangadya reported that some commissioners carry guns. They serve for a period of six years and are eligible for re-appointment.

== Commission chairperson ==
The current Chairperson Mariam Wangadya was appointed on Wednesday 29th September 2021, and replaced the late Meddie Ssozi Kaggwa who died in 2019.

== International status ==
The UHRC used to be accredited with "A status" by the GANHRI, giving it enhanced access to the United Nations human rights system. It is also a member of the Network of African National Human Rights Institutions. However, the GANHRI has defered re-accreditation of the UHRC citing lack of attention for systemic torture and human rights violations in Uganda.
