= Jalore Lok Sabha constituency =

Lok Sabha constituency in Rajasthan

Coordinates: 25.3°N 72.6°E

Jalore
- Lok Sabha constituency
- Interactive Map Outlining Jalore Lok Sabha Constituency

Constituency details
- Country: India
- Region: North India
- State: Rajasthan
- Assembly constituencies: Ahore; Jalore; Bhinmal; Sanchore; Raniwara; Sirohi; Pindwara-Abu; Reodar
- Established: 1952
- Reservation: None

Member of Parliament
- 18th Lok Sabha
- Incumbent Lumbaram Choudhary
- Party: Bharatiya Janata Party
- Elected year: 2024

Jalore & Sirohi Lok Sabha constituency (Hindi pronunciation: [d͡ʒaːlɔːɾ]) is one of the 25 Lok Sabha (parliamentary) constituencies in Rajasthan state in India. It is spread over Jalore and Sirohi districts.

== Vidhan Sabha segments ==
Presently, Jalore & Sirohi Lok Sabha constituency comprises eight Vidhan Sabha (legislative assembly) segments. These are:

#	Name	District	Member	Party	2024 Lead
141	Ahore	Jalore	Chhagan Singh Rajpurohit	BJP	BJP
142	Jalore (SC)	Jalore	Jogeshwar Garg	BJP	BJP
143	Bhinmal	Jalore	Samarjit Singh	INC	BJP
144	Sanchore	Jalore	Jivaram Choudhary	IND	BJP
145	Raniwara	Jalore	Ratan Devasi	INC	BJP
146	Sirohi	Sirohi	Ota Ram Dewasi	BJP	BJP
147	Pindwara-Abu (ST)	Sirohi	Samaram	BJP	BJP
148	Reodar (SC)	Sirohi	Motiram Koli	INC	BJP

== Members of Parliament ==
Year	Member	Party
1952	Bhawani Singh	Independent
1957	Suraj Ratan Damani	Indian National Congress
1962	Harish Chandra Mathur	Indian National Congress
1967	Deoki Nandan Patodia	Swatantra Party
1971	Narendra Kumar Sanghi	Indian National Congress (R)
1977	Hukam Ram	Janata Party
1980	Virda Ram Phulwariya	Indian National Congress
1984	Buta Singh	Indian National Congress
1989	Kailash Meghwal	Bharatiya Janata Party
1991	Buta Singh	Indian National Congress
1996	Parsaram Meghwal	Indian National Congress
1998	Buta Singh	Independent
1999	Buta Singh	Indian National Congress
2004	Susheela Bangaru	Bharatiya Janata Party
2009	Devji Patel	Bharatiya Janata Party
2014	Devji Patel	Bharatiya Janata Party
2019	Devji Patel	Bharatiya Janata Party
2024	Lumbaram Choudhary	Bharatiya Janata Party

== Election results ==
=== 2024 ===
2024 Indian general election: Jalore & Sirohi
Party	Candidate	Votes	%	±%
BJP	Lumbaram Choudhary	796,783	54.91	▼1.85
INC	Vaibhav Gehlot	5,95,240	41.02	▲3.44
NOTA	None of the above	18,459	1.27	▼0.03
Majority		2,01,543	13.89	▼5.29
Turnout		14,51,126	62.89	▼2.85
BJP hold		Swing	▼1.85	

=== 2019 ===
2019 Indian general elections: Jalore & Sirohi
Party	Candidate	Votes	%	±%
BJP	Devji Patel	772,833	56.76	
INC	Ratan Dewasi Desai	5,11,723	37.58	
NOTA	None of the Above	17,714	1.30	
Independent	Lukaram	13,485	0.99	
Margin of victory		2,61,110	19.18	−15.85
Turnout		13,61,627	65.74	+6.12
BJP hold		Swing		

=== 2014 ===
2014 Indian general elections: Jalore & Sirohi
Party	Candidate	Votes	%	±%
BJP	Devji Patel	580,508	53.35	+19.68
INC	Udai Lal Anjana	1,99,363	18.32	−1.30
Independent	Sardar Buta Singh	1,75,344	16.12	−8.93
BSP	Otaram	29,998	2.76	N/A
Independent	Shankar Lal Darji	16,399	1.51	N/A
NOTA	None of the above	11,183	1.03	N/A
Majority		3,81,145	35.03	+26.77
Turnout		10,88,045	59.62	+21.64
BJP hold		Swing	+19.72	

=== 2009 ===
2009 Indian general elections: Jalore & Sirohi
Party	Candidate	Votes	%	±%
BJP	Devji M Patel	1,94,503	33.67	−15.31
Independent	Sardar Buta Singh	1,44,698	25.05	N/A
INC	Sandhya Choudhary	1,13,332	19.62	−23.39
Independent	Sukhraj	20,458	3.54	
Majority		49,805	8.62	+2.65
Turnout		5,77,606	37.98	
BJP hold		Swing	-15.31	

=== 2004 ===
2004 Indian general elections: Jalore & Sirohi
Party	Candidate	Votes	%	±%
BJP	B. Susheela	3,21,255	48.98	+3.18
INC	Sardar Buta Singh	2,82,063	43.01	−8.37
Independent	Jasa Ram	28,061	4.28	
BSP	Dinesh Katiwal	24,489	3.73	+3.23
Majority		39,192	5.97	+0.39
Turnout		6,55,868	45.92	−6.62
BJP gain from INC		Swing	+3.18	

=== 1998 Lok Sabha ===
- Buta Singh (IND) : 365,336 votes
- Genaram (BJP) : 199,251

== See also ==
- Jalore district
- Sirohi district
- List of constituencies of the Lok Sabha
