= Lumbaram Choudhary =

Indian politician

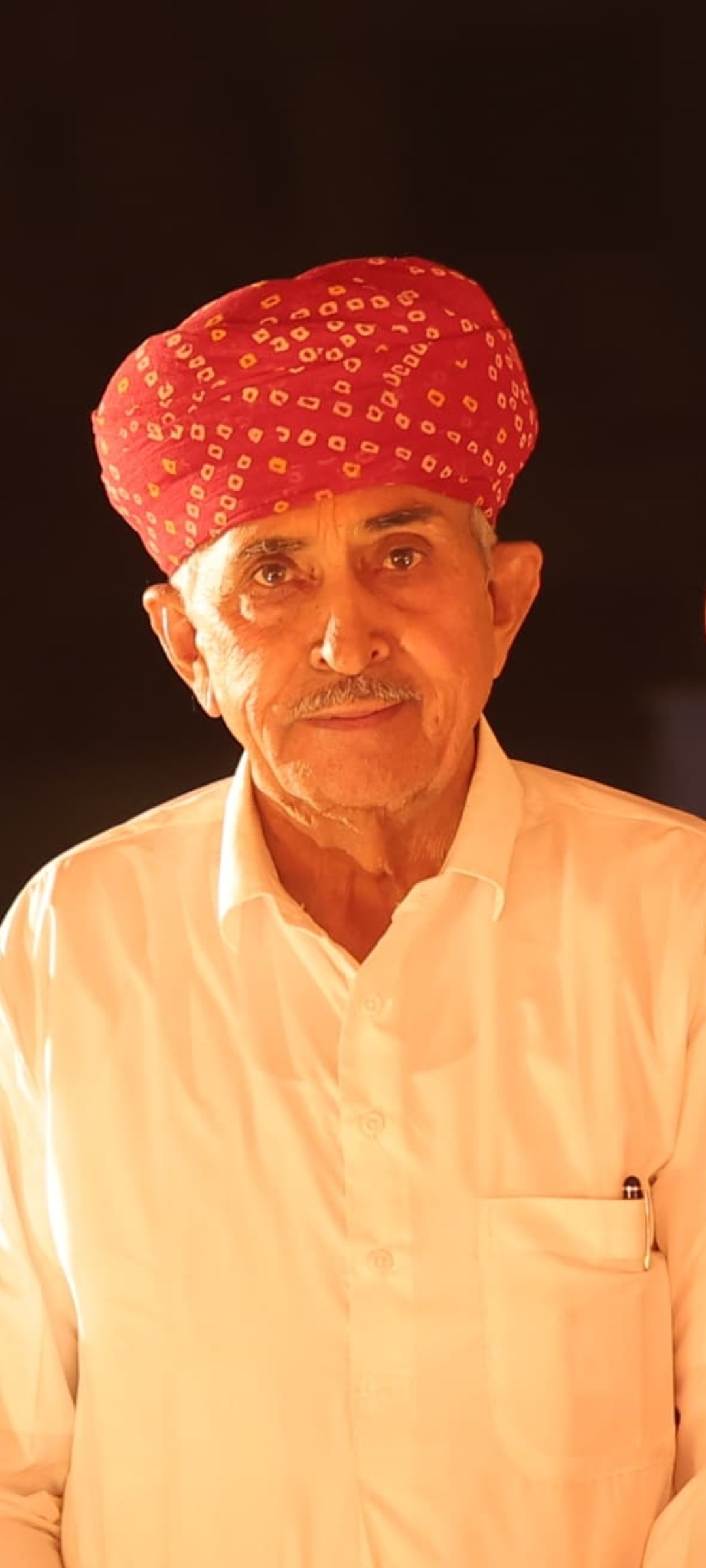

Member of Parliament, Lok Sabha
- Incumbent
- Assumed office 4 June 2024
- Prime Minister: Narendra Modi
- Preceded by: Devji M Patel
- Constituency: Jalore Sirohi

Personal details
- Party: Bharatiya Janata Party

Lumbaram Choudhary (Hindi pronunciation: [lʊmbaːɾaːm t͡ʃɔːd̪ʱ.ɾiː]) is an Indian politician from Vadeli, Sirohi, Rajasthan. He was elected as a member of Parliament from Sirohi-Jalore Lok Sabha constituency, defeating Vaibhav Gehlot. He is a member of the Bharatiya Janata Party.

He is a disciple of Thakur Jawan Singh Solanki of Mirpur, who served as the first member of the Legislative Assembly for the Sirohi constituency.

Singh, then the district head of the Bharatiya Janata Party, took up Choudhary from a small farm in the nearby village of Vadeli, first as an LIC agent. Singh then appointed Choudhary as a booth level agent at his own village, Mirpur, in 1982. This confirmed Choudhary entry into politics and he became a member of the Bharatiya Janata Party under Singh's guidance. Until his death in 2003, Singh played an active role in Choudhary's career.
