= Vadeli, Sirohi =

Vadeli
- Village
- Location in Rajasthan, India Vadeli (India)
- Coordinates: 24.805959°N 72.753716°E
- Country: India
- State: Rajasthan
- District: Sirohi
- Talukas: Sirohi

Government
  - Body: Gram panchayat
- Time zone: UTC+5:30 (IST)
- PIN: 307001
- Telephone code: 02972
- ISO 3166 code: RJ-IN
- Vehicle registration: RJ-24
- Sex ratio: ♂/♀
- Lok Sabha constituency: Sirohi (Rajasthan Assembly Constituency)
- Vidhan Sabha constituency: Sirohi
- Civic agency: Gram panchayat

Vadeli is a village located in Sirohi Tehsil of Sirohi district, Rajasthan with a total of 120 families residing. Vadeli village has a population of 685 of which 349 were males while 336 were females as per Population Census 2011.

== Historical context and the legend of Vadeli ==
Before Sirohi became the primary seat of power, the region was known as the Chandravati state. The Parmar dynasty held sway over the area around Abu and Sirohi from approximately 1190 AD. Later power transferred from the Parmar dynasty to the Deora clan of Rajputs.

== Notable people ==
- Lumbaram Choudhary, politician
- Thakur Jawan Singh, politician
