= 2003 Rajasthan Legislative Assembly election =

Election in Indian state

- 1 December 2003

All 200 seats to the Rajasthan Legislative Assembly 101 seats needed for a majority
- Turnout: 67.18% (▲3.79%)
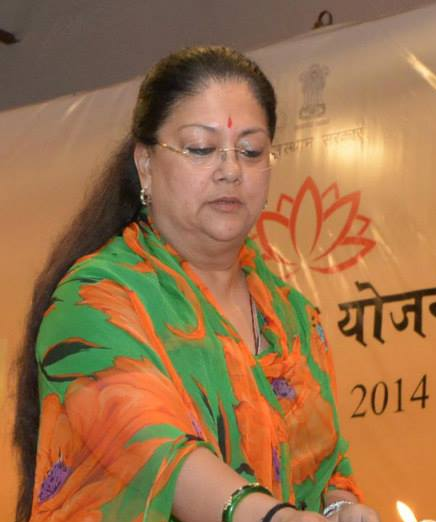

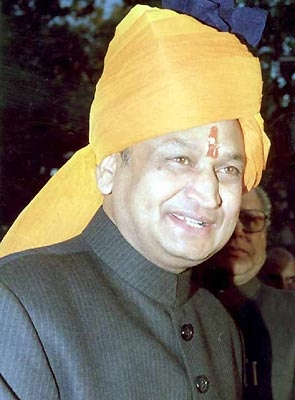
	Majority party	Minority party
Leader	Vasundhara Raje	Ashok Gehlot
Party	BJP	INC
Leader since	8 December 2003	1 December 1998
Leader's seat	Jhalrapatan	Sardarpura
Last election	33	153
Seats won	120	56
Seat change	▲87	▼97
Chief Minister before election
Ashok Gehlot
INC
Elected Chief Minister
Vasundhara Raje Scindia
BJP

Legislative Assembly elections were held in the Indian state of Rajasthan in 2003. The incumbent ruling party INC lost to the BJP.

== Exit polls ==
Survey	Date	BJP	INC	Source
Aaj Tak-OGR Marg	September 2003	85-95	70-80	
Sahara Samay-DRS	September 2003	94	84	

== Parties and Alliance ==
Party/Alliance Name	Flag	Electoral symbol	Leader	Seats contested
Bharatiya Janata Party			Vasundhara Raje	197
Indian National Congress			Ashok Gehlot	200

== Results ==
Party	Votes	%	+/–	Seats	+/–
Bharatiya Janata Party	8,929,572	39.20	▲5.97	120	▲87
Indian National Congress	8,120,605	35.65	▼9.30	56	▼97
Bahujan Samaj Party	904,686	3.97	▲1.80	2	Steady
Indian National Lok Dal	588,452	2.58	▲2.06	4	▲4
Rajasthan Samajik Nyaya Manch	507,703	2.23	▲2.23	1	▲1
Janata Dal (United)	204,468	0.90	▲0.90	2	▲2
Samajwadi Party	198,317	0.87	▲0.53	0	Steady
Communist Party of India (Marxist)	176,123	0.77	▼0.04	1	Steady
Nationalist Congress Party	146,685	0.64	▲0.64	0	Steady
Rashtriya Lok Dal	100,929	0.44	▲0.16	0	Steady
Lok Janshakti Party	84,128	0.37	▲0.37	1	Steady
Others	227,670	1.00	▼1.18	0	Steady
Independent	2,590,717	11.37	▼3.04	13	▲6
Total	22,780,055	100.00	–	200	–

== Elected members ==
Constituency	Reserved for (SC/ST/None)	Member	Party
Bhadra	None	Dr. Suresh Chaudhary	Independent
Nohar	None	Bahadur Singh	Indian National Lok Dal
Tibi	SC	Dharmendra Kumar	Bharatiya Janata Party
Hanumangarh	None	Vinod Kumar S/o Atma Ram	Indian National Congress
Sangaria	None	Gurjant Singh	Bharatiya Janata Party
Ganganagar	None	Surendra Singh Rathore	Bharatiya Janata Party
Kesrisinghpur	SC	O P Mahendra	Bharatiya Janata Party
Karanpur	None	Surendra Pal Singh	Bharatiya Janata Party
Raisinghnagar	SC	Lalchand	Bharatiya Janata Party
Pilibanga	None	Ram Pratap Kasaniya	Independent
Suratgarh	None	Ashok Nagpal	Bharatiya Janata Party
Lunkaransar	None	Virendra	Indian National Congress
Bikaner	None	Bulaki Das Kalla	Indian National Congress
Kolayat	None	Devi Singh Bhati	Samajik Nyay Manch
Nokha	SC	Govind Ram Meghwal	Bharatiya Janata Party
Dungargarh	None	Mangla Ram	Indian National Congress
Sujangarh	SC	Khema Ram Meghwal	Bharatiya Janata Party
Ratangarh	None	Raj Kumar Rinwa	Independent
Sardarshahar	None	Bhanwar Lal Sharma	Indian National Congress
Churu	None	Rajendra Singh Rathore	Bharatiya Janata Party
Taranagar	None	Dr. Chandra Shekhar Baid	Indian National Congress
Sadulpur	None	Nand Lal Poonia	Indian National Congress
Pilani	None	Sharwan Kumar	Indian National Congress
Surajgarh	SC	Sundar Lal	Bharatiya Janata Party
Khetri	None	Data Ram	Bharatiya Janata Party
Gudha	None	Ranveer Singh	Lok Jan Shakti Party
Nawalgarh	None	Pratibha Singh	Independent
Jhunjhunu	None	Sumitra Singh	Bharatiya Janata Party
Mandawa	None	Ram Narain Chaudhary	Indian National Congress
Fatehpur	None	Bhanwaru Khan	Indian National Congress
Lachhmangarh	SC	Kesar Dev	Bharatiya Janata Party
Sikar	None	Raj Kumari Sharma	Bharatiya Janata Party
Dhod	None	Amra Ram	Communist Party of India
Danta - Ramgarh	None	Narain Singh	Indian National Congress
Srimadhopur	None	Harlal Singh Kharra	Independent
Khandela	None	Mahadeo Singh Khandela	Indian National Congress
Neem-ka-thana	None	Prem Singh Bajor	Bharatiya Janata Party
Chomu	None	Ram Lal Sharma	Bharatiya Janata Party
Amber	None	Lalchand Kataria	Indian National Congress
Jaipur Rural	None	Brij Kishore Sharma	Indian National Congress
Hawamahal	None	Surendra Pareek	Bharatiya Janata Party
Johribazar	None	Kalicharan Saraf	Bharatiya Janata Party
Kishanpole	None	Mohan Lal Gupta	Bharatiya Janata Party
Bani Park	None	Prof. Beeru Singh Rathore	Bharatiya Janata Party
Phulera	None	Navratan Rajoria	Bharatiya Janata Party
Dudu	SC	Babulal Nagar	Indian National Congress
Sanganer	None	Ghanshyam Tiwari	Bharatiya Janata Party
Phagi	SC	Laxmi Narain Bairwa	Bharatiya Janata Party
Lalsot	ST	Virendra	Bharatiya Janata Party
Sikrai	ST	Ram Kishore Meena	Bharatiya Janata Party
Bandikui	None	Murari Lal Meena	Bahujan Samaj Party
Dausa	SC	Nand Lal Banshiwal	Bharatiya Janata Party
Bassi	None	Kanhaiya Lal Meena	Bharatiya Janata Party
Jamwa Ramgarh	None	Ram Chandra	Indian National Congress
Bairath	None	Rao Rajendra Singh	Bharatiya Janata Party
Kotputli	None	Subhash Chandra	Independent
Bansur	None	Mahipal Singh Yadav	Indian National Congress
Behror	None	Karan Singh Yadav	Indian National Congress
Mandawar	None	Dharampal Chaudhary	Bharatiya Janata Party
Tizara	None	Durru Miyan	Indian National Congress
Khairthal	SC	Jay Ram	Bharatiya Janata Party
Ramgarh	None	Zubair Khan	Indian National Congress
Alwar	None	Jitendra Singh	Indian National Congress
Thanagazi	None	Kanti	Independent
Rajgarh	ST	Samarth Lal	Bharatiya Janata Party
Lachhmangarh	None	Jagat Singh	Indian National Congress
Kathumar	SC	Ramesh Chand Khinchi	Indian National Congress
Kaman	None	Madan Mohan Singhal	Bharatiya Janata Party
Nagar	None	Mohamad Mahir Azad	Indian National Congress
Deeg	None	Arun Singh	Indian National Lok Dal
Kumher	None	Digamber Singh	Bharatiya Janata Party
Bharatpur	None	Vijay Bansal	Indian National Lok Dal
Rupbas	SC	Nirbhay Lal	Indian National Congress
Nadbai	None	Krishnendra Kaur	Independent
Weir	SC	Jagannath Pahadia	Indian National Congress
Bayana	None	Atar Singh Badana	Bharatiya Janata Party
Rajakhera	None	Pradhuman Singh	Indian National Congress
Dholpur	None	Banwari Lal	Indian National Congress
Bari	None	Daljeet Singh	Indian National Congress
Karauli	None	Suresh Meena	Bahujan Samaj Party
Sapotra	ST	Sukh Lal	Bharatiya Janata Party
Khandar	SC	Ashok	Indian National Congress
Sawai Madhopur	None	Kirodi Lal Meena	Bharatiya Janata Party
Bamanwas	ST	Heera Lal	Independent
Gangapur	None	Durga Prasad	Indian National Congress
Hindaun	SC	Kalu Ram	Indian National Lok Dal
Mahuwa	None	Harigyan Singh	Bharatiya Janata Party
Toda Bhim	ST	Batti Lal	Bharatiya Janata Party
Niwai	SC	Heera Lal	Bharatiya Janata Party
Tonk	None	Mahaveer	Bharatiya Janata Party
Uniara	None	Prabhu Lal	Bharatiya Janata Party
Todaraisingh	None	Nathu Singh Gurjar	Bharatiya Janata Party
Malpura	None	Jeetram	Bharatiya Janata Party
Kishangarh	None	Bhagirath Choudhary	Bharatiya Janata Party
Ajmer East	SC	Anita Bhadel	Bharatiya Janata Party
Ajmer West	None	Vasudev Devnani	Bharatiya Janata Party
Pushkar	None	Dr. Shri Gopal Baheti	Indian National Congress
Nasirabad	None	Govind Singh	Indian National Congress
Beawar	None	Devi Shankar	Bharatiya Janata Party
Masuda	None	Vishnu Modi	Bharatiya Janata Party
Bhinai	None	Sanwar Lal	Bharatiya Janata Party
Kekri	SC	Gopal Lal Dhobi	Bharatiya Janata Party
Hindoli	None	Hari Mohan	Indian National Congress
Nainwa	None	Ram Narayan	Indian National Congress
Patan	SC	Babu Lal	Bharatiya Janata Party
Bundi	None	Mamta Sharma	Indian National Congress
Kota	None	Om Birla	Bharatiya Janata Party
Ladpura	None	Bhawani Singh Rajawat	Bharatiya Janata Party
Digod	None	Bharat Singh	Indian National Congress
Pipalda	SC	Prabhu Lal	Bharatiya Janata Party
Baran	None	Parmod Kumar	Independent
Kishanganj	ST	Hemraj	Independent
Atru	SC	Madan Dilawar	Bharatiya Janata Party
Chhabra	None	Pratap Singh Singhvi	Bharatiya Janata Party
Ramganjmandi	None	Prahlad Gunjal	Bharatiya Janata Party
Khanpur	None	Narendra Nagar	Bharatiya Janata Party
Manohar Thana	None	Jagannath	Bharatiya Janata Party
Jhalrapatan	None	Vasundhara Raje	Bharatiya Janata Party
Pirawa	None	Kanhaiya Lal Patidar	Bharatiya Janata Party
Dag	SC	Sanehlata	Bharatiya Janata Party
Begun	None	Chunni Lal Dhakad	Bharatiya Janata Party
Gangrar	SC	Arjun Lal Jingar	Bharatiya Janata Party
Kapasin	None	Badri Lal Jat	Bharatiya Janata Party
Chittorgarh	None	Narpat Singh Rajvi	Bharatiya Janata Party
Nimbahera	None	Ashok Kumar Navlakha	Bharatiya Janata Party
Badi Sadri	None	Prakash Chaudhary	Indian National Congress
Pratapgarh	ST	Nand Lal Meena	Bharatiya Janata Party
Kushalgarh	ST	Fateysingh	Janata Dal
Danpur	ST	Arjunsingh	Indian National Congress
Ghatol	ST	Navneetlal Ninama	Bharatiya Janata Party
Banswara	None	Bhawani Joshi	Bharatiya Janata Party
Bagidora	ST	Jeetmal Khant	Janata Dal
Sagwara	ST	Kanak Mal Katara	Bharatiya Janata Party
Chorasi	ST	Sushil	Bharatiya Janata Party
Dungarpur	ST	Nathu Ram Ahari	Indian National Congress
Aspur	ST	Raiyaji Meena	Indian National Congress
Lasadia	ST	Gautam Lal	Bharatiya Janata Party
Vallabhnagar	None	Randhir Singh Bhinder	Bharatiya Janata Party
Mavli	None	Shanti Lal Chaplot	Bharatiya Janata Party
Rajsamand	SC	Banshi Lal Khatik	Bharatiya Janata Party
Nathdwara	None	C. P. Joshi	Indian National Congress
Udaipur	None	Gulab Chand Kataria	Bharatiya Janata Party
Udaipur Rural	ST	Vandna Meena	Bharatiya Janata Party
Salumber	ST	Arjun Lal	Bharatiya Janata Party
Sarada	ST	Raghuveer Meena	Indian National Congress
Kherwara	ST	Nana Lal Ahari	Bharatiya Janata Party
Phalasia	ST	Babulal Kharadi	Bharatiya Janata Party
Gongunda	ST	Mangi Lal Garasiya	Indian National Congress
Kumbhalgarh	None	Surendra Singh Rathore	Bharatiya Janata Party
Bhim	None	Hari Singh (panna Singh)	Bharatiya Janata Party
Mandal	None	Kalulal Gurjar	Bharatiya Janata Party
Sahada	None	Kailash Chandra Trivedi	Indian National Congress
Bhilwara	None	Subhash Chandra Baheria	Bharatiya Janata Party
Mandalgarh	None	Shivcharan Mathur	Indian National Congress
Jahazpur	None	Shivji Ram Meena	Bharatiya Janata Party
Shahpura	SC	Ramratan Bairwa	Bharatiya Janata Party
Banera	None	Ramlal	Indian National Congress
Asind	None	Hagami Lal	Independent
Jaitaran	None	Surendra Goyal	Bharatiya Janata Party
Raipur	None	C D Deval	Indian National Congress
Sojat	None	Laxmi Narayan Dave	Bharatiya Janata Party
Kharchi	None	Khushveer Singh	Indian National Congress
Desuri	SC	Laxmi Barupal	Bharatiya Janata Party
Pali	None	Gyanchand Parakh	Bharatiya Janata Party
Sumerpur	None	Madan Rathore	Bharatiya Janata Party
Bali	None	Pushpendra Singh	Bharatiya Janata Party
Sirohi	None	Sanyam Lodha	Indian National Congress
Pindwara Abu	ST	Samaram Garasiya	Bharatiya Janata Party
Reodar	SC	Jagasi Ram Koli	Bharatiya Janata Party
Sanchore	None	Jeewaram Choudhary	Bharatiya Janata Party
Raniwara	None	Arjun Singh Deora	Bharatiya Janata Party
Bhinmal	None	Samarjit Singh	Indian National Congress
Jalore	SC	Jogeshwar Garg	Bharatiya Janata Party
Ahore	None	Shankar Singh Rajpurohit	Bharatiya Janata Party
Siwana	SC	Teekam Chand Kant	Independent
Pachpadra	None	Amara Ram	Bharatiya Janata Party
Barmer	None	Taga Ram	Bharatiya Janata Party
Gudamalani	None	Hemaram Choudhary	Indian National Congress
Chohtan	None	Gangaram Choudhary	Bharatiya Janata Party
Sheo	None	Jalam Singh	Bharatiya Janata Party
Jaisalmer	None	Sang Singh	Bharatiya Janata Party
Shergarh	None	Babu Singh Rathore	Bharatiya Janata Party
Jodhpur	None	Suryakanta Vyas	Bharatiya Janata Party
Sardarpura	None	Ashok Gehlot	Indian National Congress
Sursagar	SC	Mohan Meghawal	Bharatiya Janata Party
Luni	None	Ram Singh Vishnoi	Indian National Congress
Bilara	None	Ram Narain Dudi	Bharatiya Janata Party
Bhopalgarh	None	Mahipal Maderna	Indian National Congress
Osian	None	Banne Singh	Bharatiya Janata Party
Phalodi	None	Ram Narayan Vishnoi	Bharatiya Janata Party
Nagaur	None	Gajendra Singh Khimsar	Bharatiya Janata Party
Jayal	SC	Madan Lal Meghwal	Bharatiya Janata Party
Ladnu	None	Manohar Singh	Bharatiya Janata Party
Deedwana	None	Yunus Khan	Bharatiya Janata Party
Nawan	None	Harish Chand	Bharatiya Janata Party
Makrana	None	Bhanwar Lal Rajpurohit	Bharatiya Janata Party
Parbatsar	SC	Rakesh Meghwal	Bharatiya Janata Party
Degana	None	Richpal Singh Mirdha	Indian National Congress
Merta	None	Bhanwar Singh	Bharatiya Janata Party
Mundwa	None	Usha Punia	Bharatiya Janata Party
