= Bakra, Jalore =

Bakra
- Village
- Location in Rajasthan
- Coordinates: 25.252°N 72.457°E
- Country: India
- State: Rajasthan
- Jalore: Jalore
- Elevation: 140 m (460 ft)

Population (2011)
  - Total: 5,953

Languages
  - Official: Marwari
- Time zone: UTC+5:30 (IST)
- PIN: 343025
- Telephone code: STD code 02977
- Vehicle registration: Rj-16
- Lok Sabha constituency: Jalore
- Website: jalore

Bakra is a village located in Jalore district in the state of Rajasthan, India. It had an estimated population of 5,953 at the 2011 Census.
