= Mirpur Jain Temple =

Śvetāmbara Jain Temple in Rajasthan, India

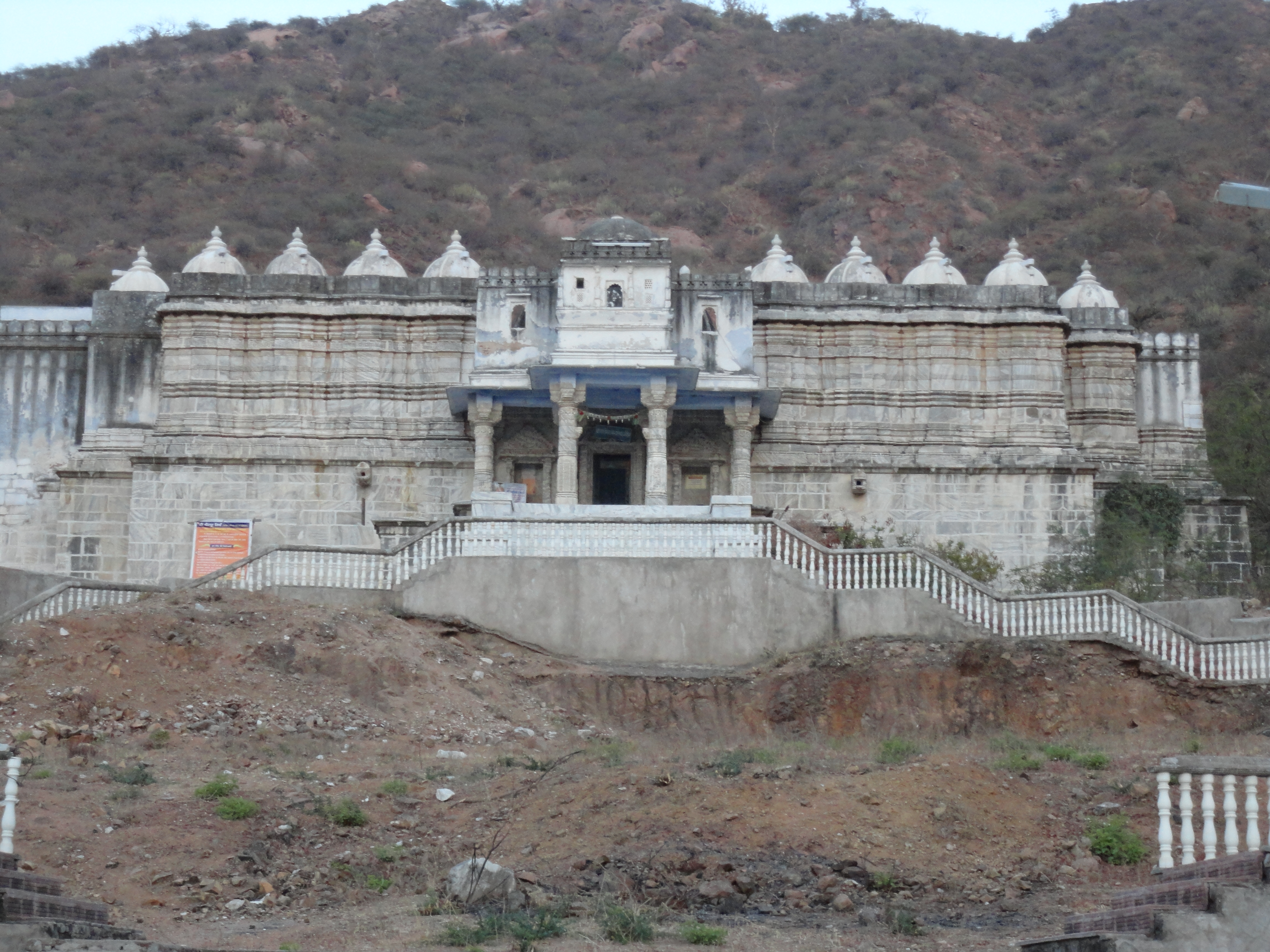
- Mirpur Jain Temple

- Location within Rajasthan

Religion
- Affiliation: Jainism
- Sect: Śvetāmbara
- Deity: Parshvanatha
- Governing body: Seth Kalyanji Parmanand ji Trust, Sirohi

Location
- Location: Mirpur, Sirohi, Rajasthan, India
- Coordinates: 24.782967°N 72.786408°E

Architecture
- Completed: 9th century
- Temple: 4

Mirpur Jain Temple (Aati Prachin Hamirpura Bhidbhanjan Parshvanath)/108 Shri Hamirpura Parshwanath Jain Tirth is the first Marble Temple (Monument) of Rajasthan and an Ancient Historical site of Śvetāmbara Jain pilgrimage, built in the 9th century and partially damaged by Mahmud Begada in 13th Century, situated in Mirpur, a fortified village in the Sirohi district of Rajasthan, India. This temple is dedicated to the 23rd Tirthankara, Lord Parshvanath (Bhidbhanjan Parshvanath). The village has four Jain temples. The temple is famous for its art and exquisite carvings, comparable to those at the Dilwara temples.

== History ==
Mirpur Jain Temple was built in the 9th century AD, during the reign of the Solanki Rajputs. The Mirpur temple is generally considered the oldest marble monument in Rajasthan. It is devoted to the 23rd Jain tirthankara, Pārśva. The temple has inscriptions dating back to 1162 AD that mentions the history of Hamirgarh. There are seven inscriptions dating from the 12th to the 15th century, and the latest inscription dates back to the 19th century.

Mahmud Begada, the Sultan of Gujarat, damaged this temple in the 13th century, Some idols from this temple are still broken today and can be seen inside the upper dome. Their legs and hands are still broken. He led his army from the back side of the hill, approached downwards, and attacked this Temple. He also attacked the fortified Village.

== Main temple ==
Mirpur Jain Temple was built in the 9th century AD. Mirpur Jain Temple is the most important building near Sirohi. This temple is also mentioned in the 'World And Encyclopedia of Art.' The temple is famous for its art and exquisite carvings. The fine carvings of the temple are comparable to the ones in Dilwara temples. The domes, pillars, and borders are the features unique to this temple. The murals on the ceiling of the temple show unique motifs that are not visible in other Jain temples. The kalamandap stands on its high pedestal with carved pillars and engraved parikrama representing every walk of life in Indian Mythology. The indescribable artistry of this temple is famous throughout the world and is considered by many to be unmatched. The ancient art of this temple served as a model for the later Dilwara and Ranakpur temples. This temple belongs to Shvetambara sect of Jainism. The Moolnayak of the temple is a 90 cm tall white colored idol of Lord Parshvanatha called Bhidbhanjan Parshwanathji. This sculpture illustrates Parshwanath's triumph over Kamatha's upsargas, in considerable detail. In this sculpture, Dharanendra raises a hood of 5 cobras to provide shelter for Lord Parshwanath from the relentless storm set into motion by Kamatha. The temple walls and pillars are rich with carvings of floral and geometric designs.

The idols in the temple are re-anointed in an annual ceremony. The temple is managed by Seth Shri Kalyanji Paramanandji Pedhi, Sirohi and also manages Dharamshala, Bhojanshala, and an open garden.

== Other Temples ==
- Bhagvan Suparshwanathji Temple: This temple is dedicated to Suparshvanatha. The temple is built in Nagara style. The temple is famous for the beautiful glasswork of the sanctum. This temple belongs to the Digambara sect of Jainism.
- Bhagvan Mahavir Swami Temple: This temple is dedicated to Mahavir Swami. This temple is built in Nagara style. The temple is famous for paintings on the dome.
- Bhagvan Shantinath Temple: This is dedicated to Shantinatha. The temple is rich in architecture, with an amalgamation of Indo-Persian architecture. The temple has been built in the Nagara style with decorative pillars and a sanctum.

== Photo gallery ==
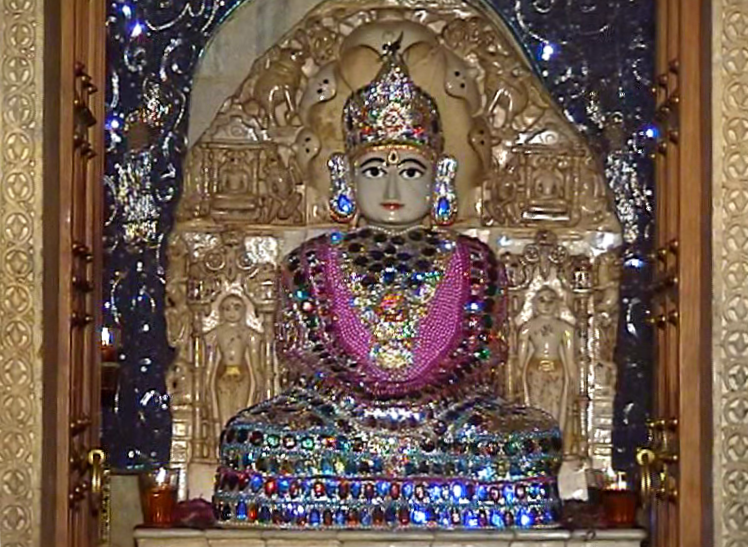
Main idol of Parshwanath

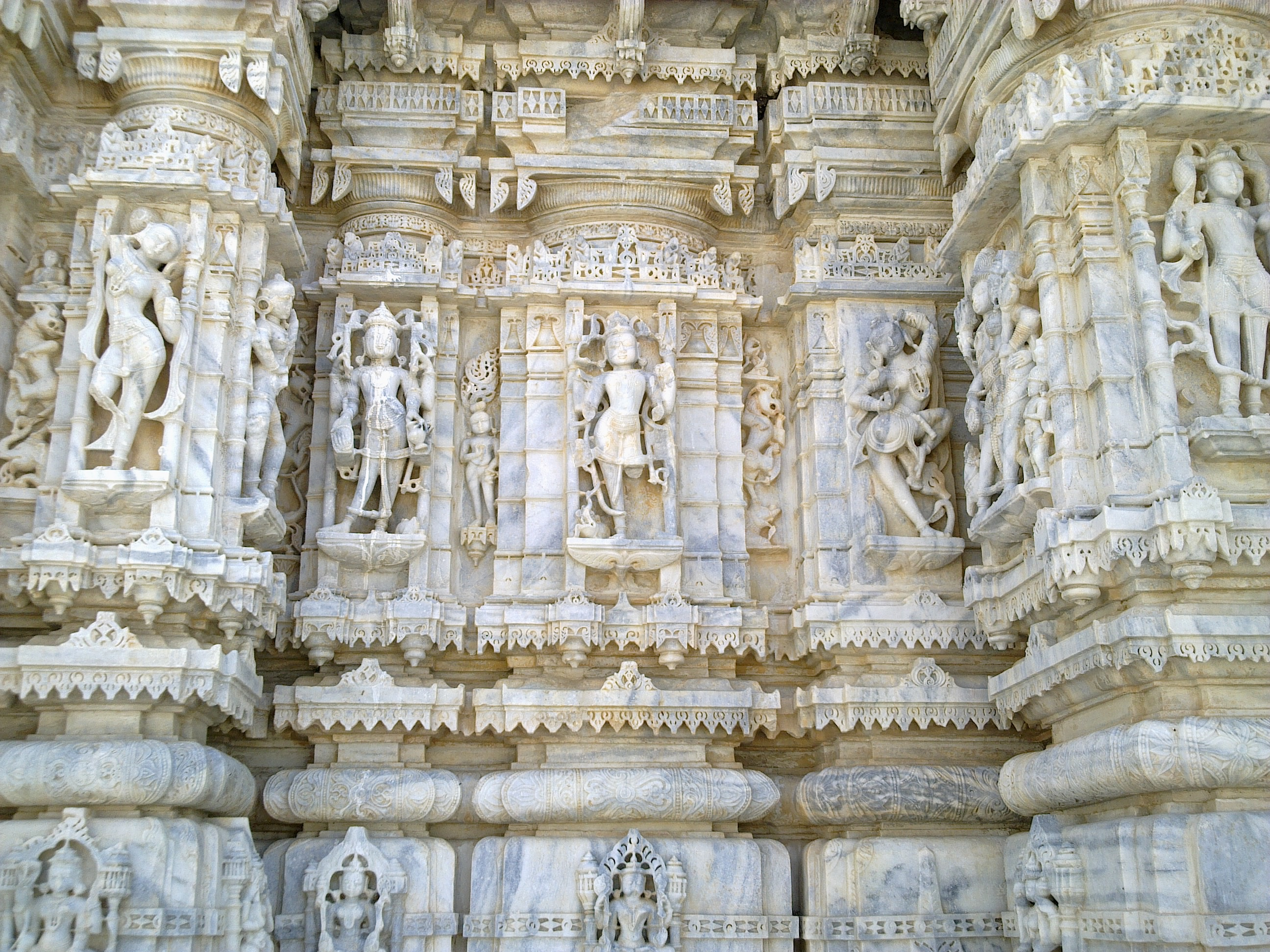
Wall of Mirpur Jain Temple

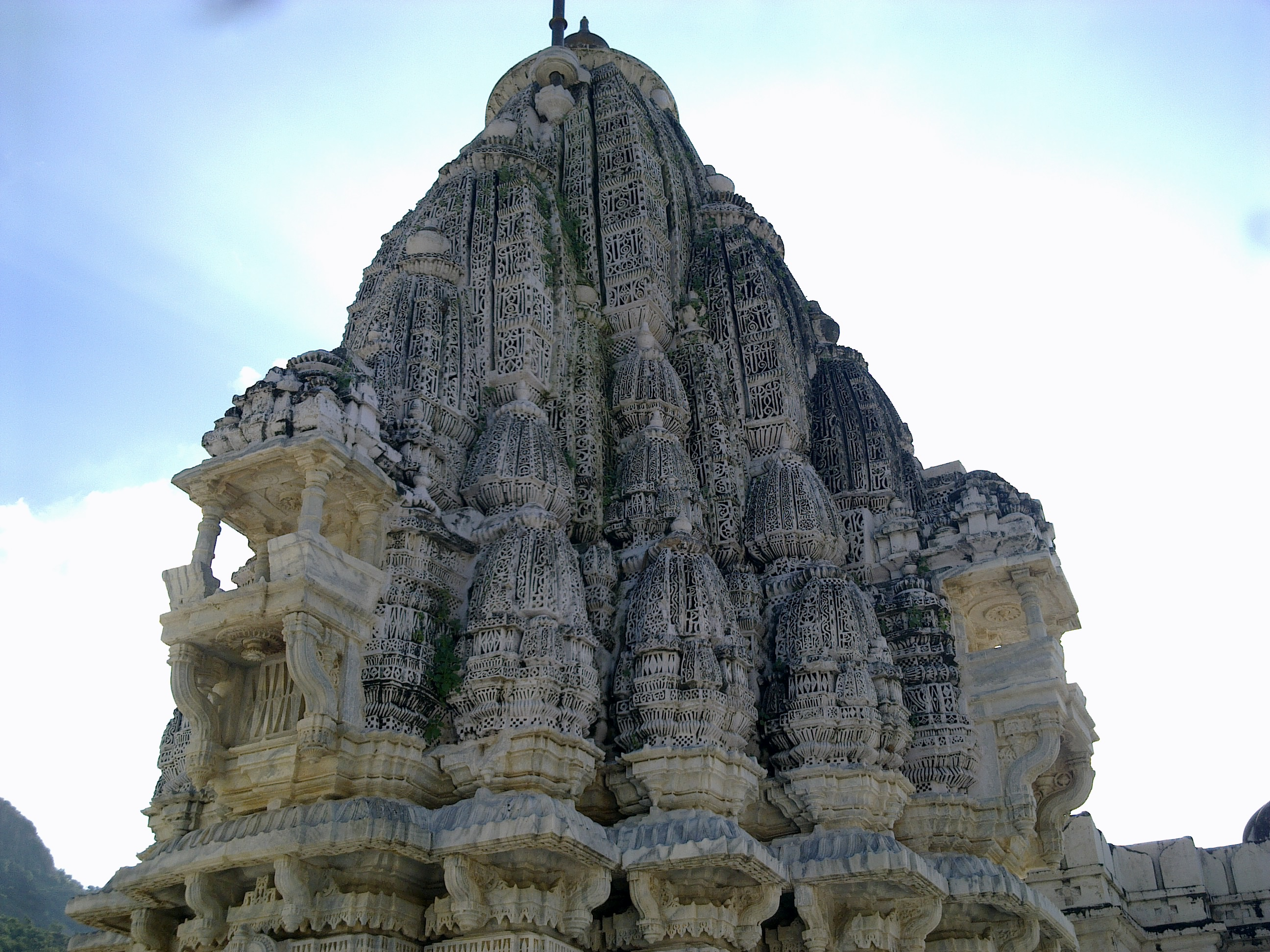
Shikhar of the Mirpur Jain Temple

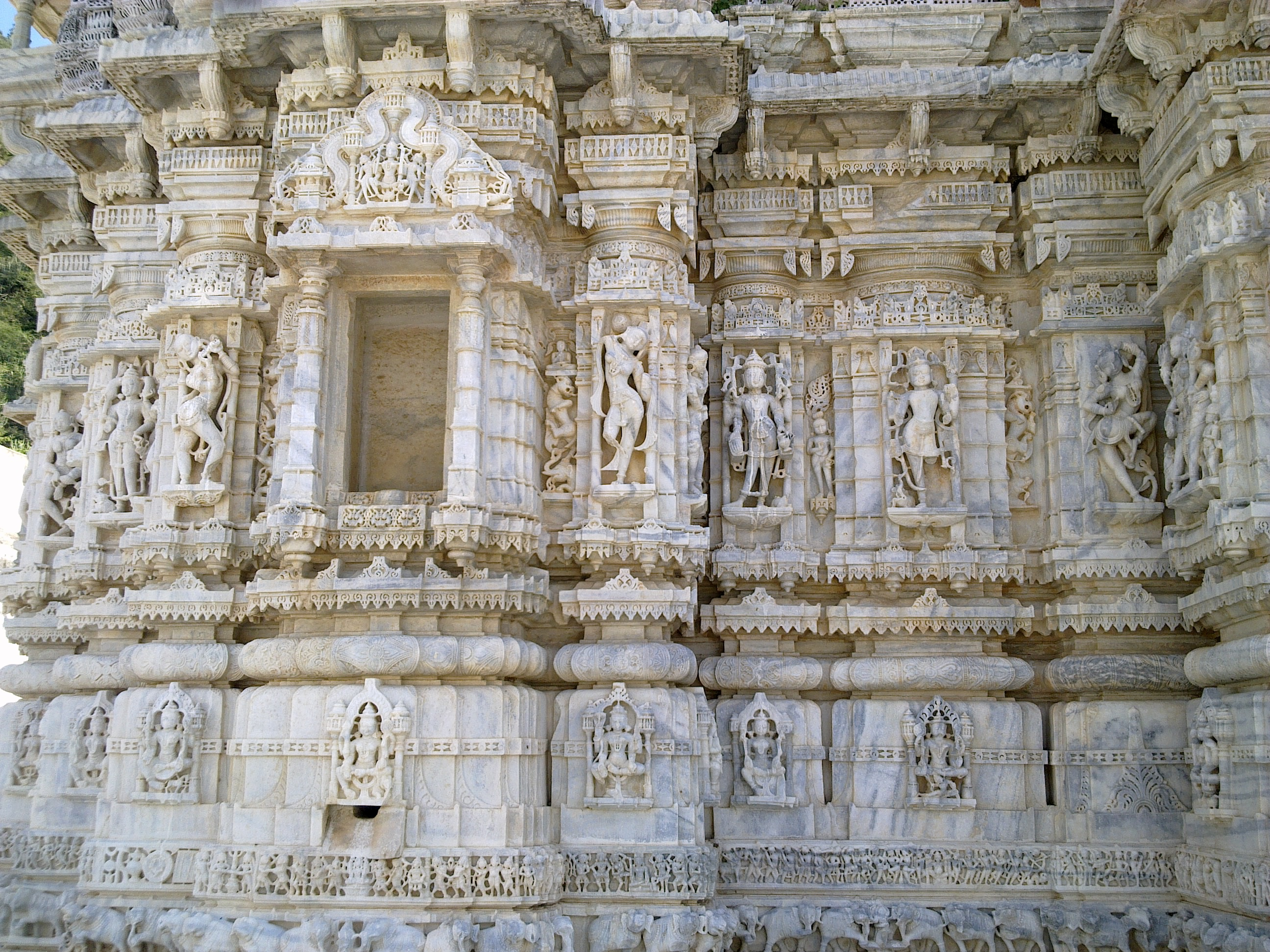
Carving on a wall

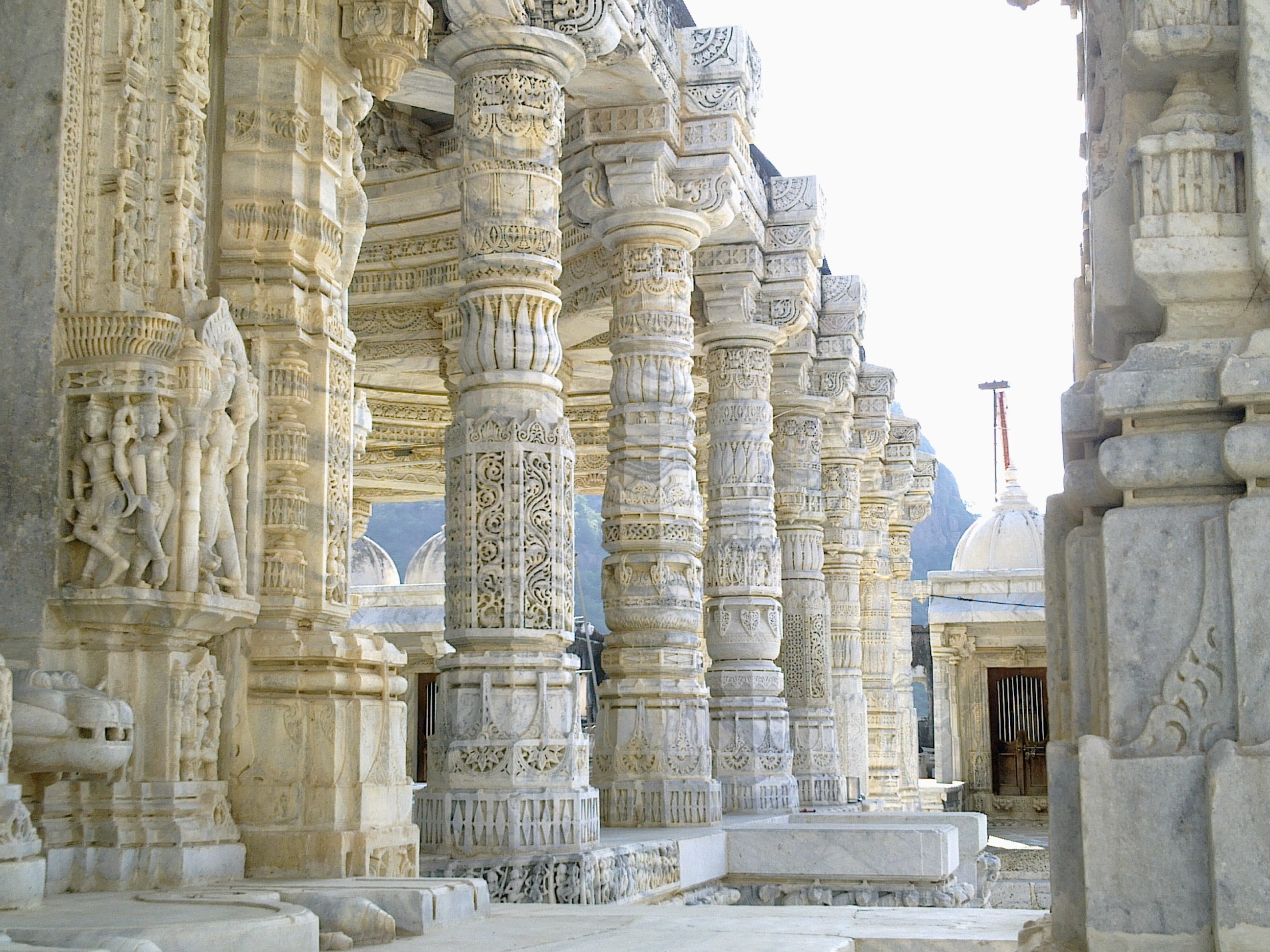
Pillars at the Mirpur Jain Temple

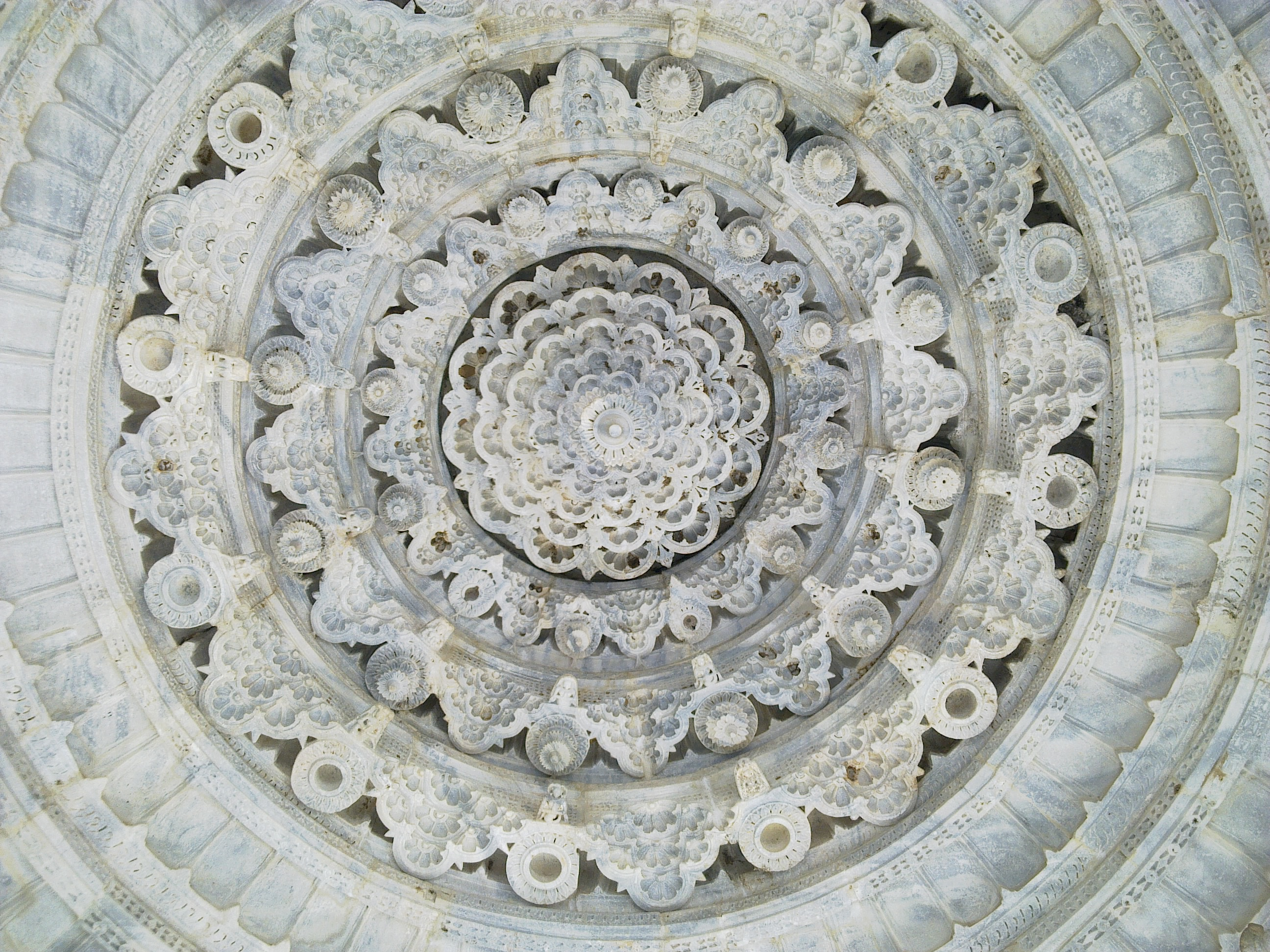
Art inside the dome at Mirpur Jain Temple

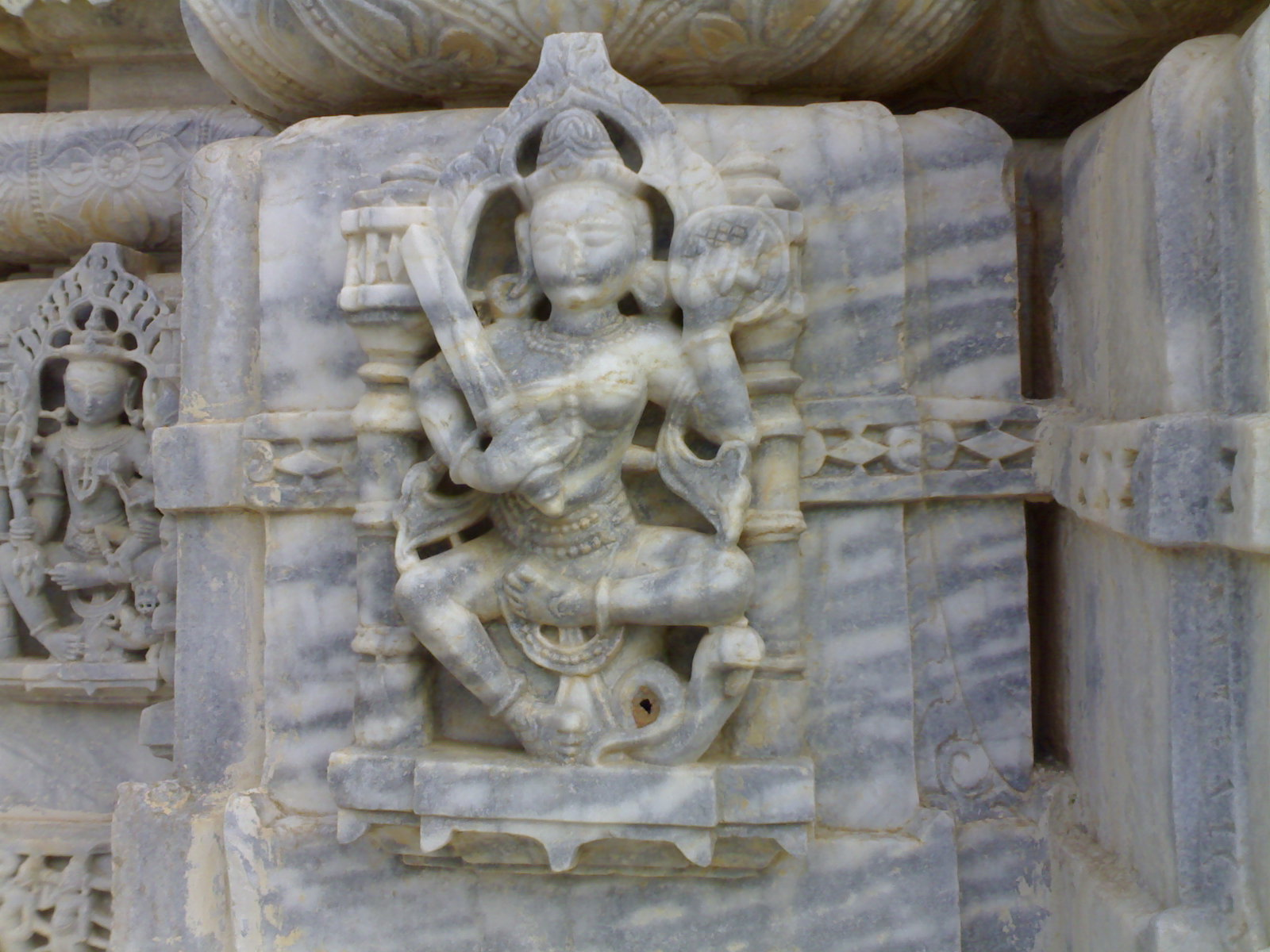
Padmavati Mata with her vahan as snake

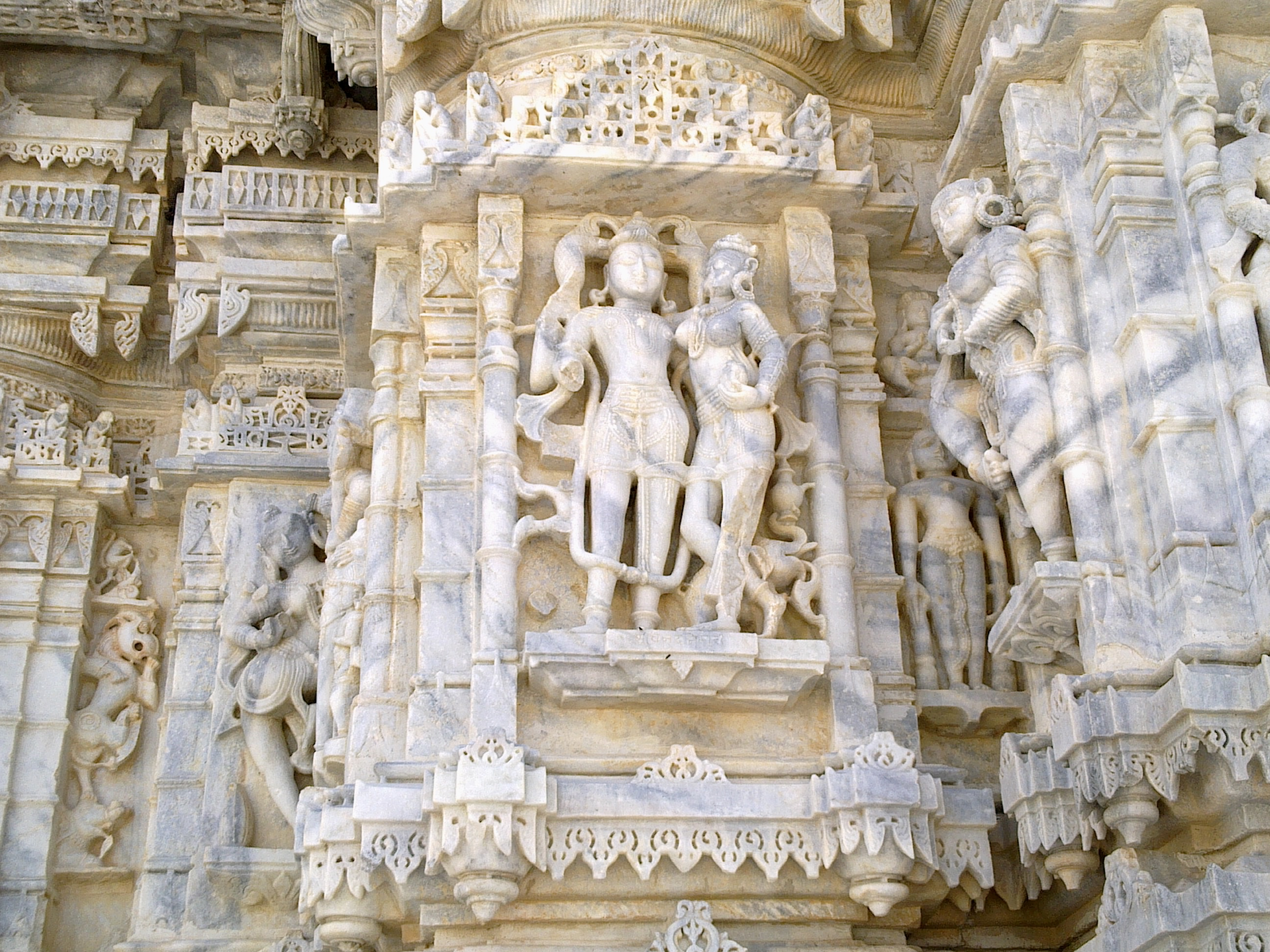
A statue of Indra on the walls

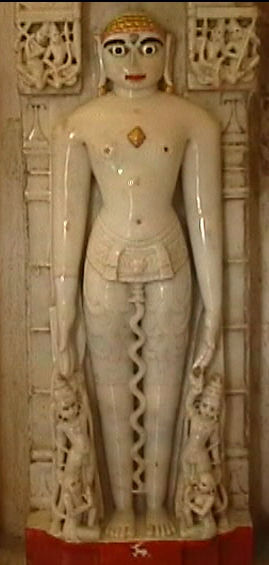
Idol of Bhagvan Mahavir Swami Temple dating to the 13th century

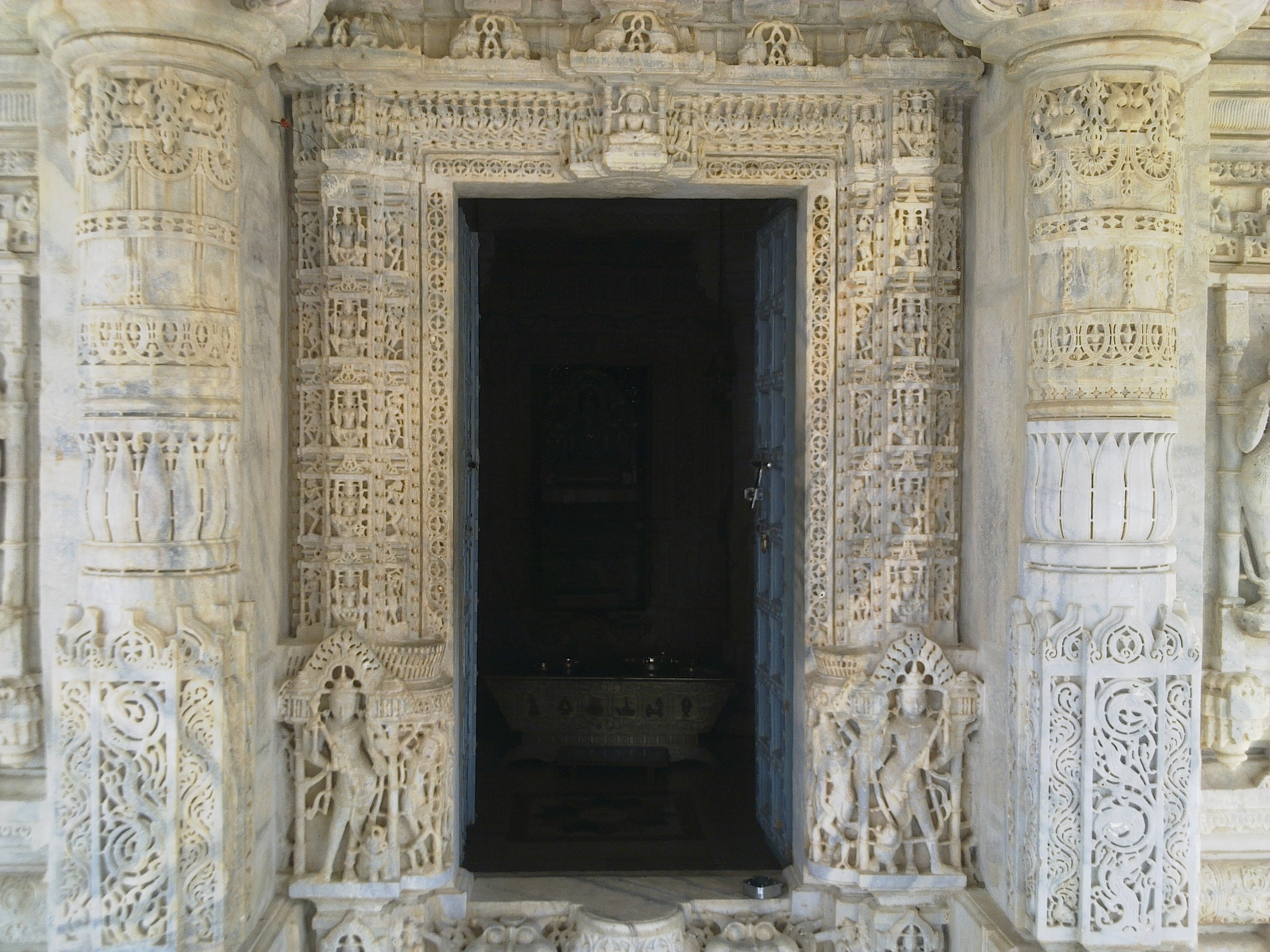
Art at the entrance to the main shrine

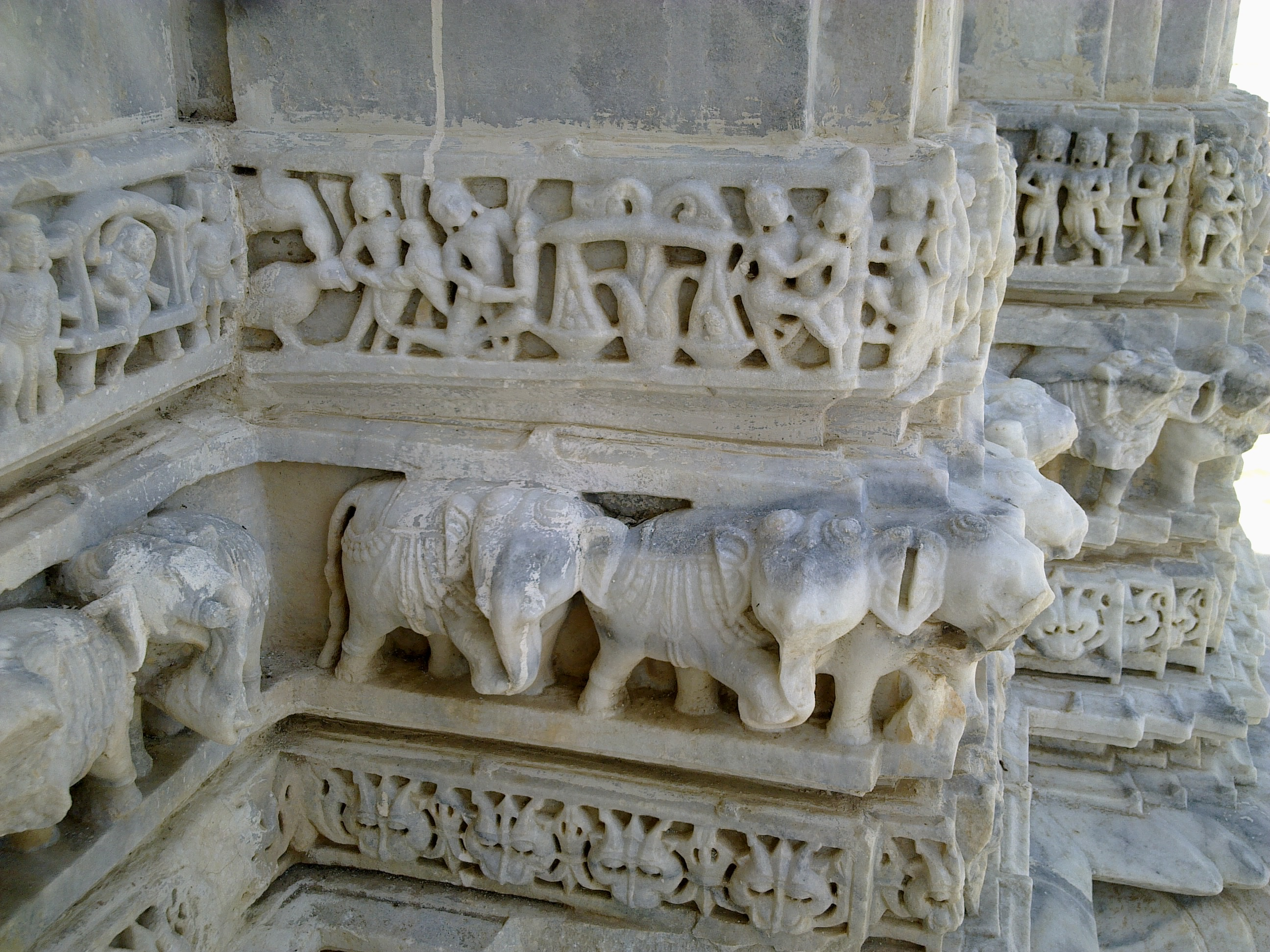
Megrath Bhav of Bhagvan Shantinathji

== See also ==
- Mirpur Jahaj Temple
- Ranakpur Jain temple
- Dilwara temples
