= Pindwara-Abu Assembly constituency =

Legislative Assembly constituency in Rajasthan State, India

Coordinates: 24.8°N 73.05°E

Pindwara-Abu
- Constituency No. 147 for the Rajasthan Legislative Assembly

Constituency details
- Country: India
- Region: North India
- State: Rajasthan
- District: Sirohi
- Lok Sabha constituency: Jalore
- Established: 1990
- Total electors: 228,333
- Reservation: ST

Member of Legislative Assembly
- 16th Rajasthan Legislative Assembly
- Incumbent Samaram Garasiya
- Party: Bharatiya Janata Party

Pindwara-Abu Assembly constituency is one of the 200 Legislative Assembly constituencies of Rajasthan state in India.

It is part of Sirohi district and is reserved for candidates belonging to the Scheduled Tribes.

== Members of the Legislative Assembly ==
| Election | Member | Party |
|---|---|---|
| 1990 | Prabhu Ram Graseeya | Bharatiya Janata Party |
| 1993 | Prabhu Ram Graseeya | Bharatiya Janata Party |
| 1998 | Lala Ram Garasiya | Indian National Congress |
| 2003 | Samaram Garasiya | Bharatiya Janata Party |
| 2008 | Ganga Ben Garasiya | Indian National Congress |
| 2013 | Samaram Garasiya | Bharatiya Janata Party |
| 2018 | Samaram Garasiya | Bharatiya Janata Party |
| 2023 | Samaram Garasiya | Bharatiya Janata Party |

== Election results ==
=== 2023 ===
2023 Rajasthan Legislative Assembly election: Pindwara-Abu
| Party | Candidate | Votes | % | ±% |
|---|---|---|---|---|
| BJP | Samaram Garasiya | 70,647 | 43.82 | −5.88 |
| INC | Leelaram Garasiya | 57,553 | 35.7 | +5.33 |
| BAP | Megharam Garasiya | 23,894 | 14.82 | |
| Bheem Tribal Congress | Amarsingh Kalundha | 2,053 | 1.27 | |
| Independent | Kapura Ram Meena | 1,798 | 1.12 | |
| BSP | Surendra Kumar | 1,613 | 1.0 | −0.58 |
| NOTA | None of the above | 3,666 | 2.27 | −1.1 |
| Majority | | 13,094 | 8.12 | −11.21 |
| Turnout | | 161,224 | 70.61 | +1.5 |
| BJP hold | | Swing | | |

=== 2018 ===
2018 Rajasthan Legislative Assembly election: Pindwara-Abu
| Party | Candidate | Votes | % | ±% |
|---|---|---|---|---|
| BJP | Samaram Garasiya | 69,360 | 49.7 | |
| INC | Lala Ram Garasiya | 42,386 | 30.37 | |
| SS | Magan Lal | 6,658 | 4.77 | |
| BTP | Gouri Shankar | 5,137 | 3.68 | |
| Independent | Rataram | 3,983 | 2.85 | |
| Independent | Revat Kumar | 2,650 | 1.9 | |
| BSP | Dalpatram | 2,208 | 1.58 | |
| Independent | Kesarmal | 1,549 | 1.11 | |
| NOTA | None of the above | 4,702 | 3.37 | |
| Majority | | 26,974 | 19.33 | |
| Turnout | | 139,551 | 69.11 | |

== See also ==
- List of constituencies of the Rajasthan Legislative Assembly
- Sirohi district
