= Shankar Singh Rajpurohit =

Indian politician

Member of the Rajasthan Legislative Assembly
- In office 2013–2018
- Preceded by: Bhagraj Choudhary
- Succeeded by: Chhagan Singh Rajpurohit
- Constituency: Ahore

Member of the Rajasthan Legislative Assembly
- In office 2003–2008

Personal details
- Party: Bharatiya Janata Party
- Occupation: Politician

Shankar Singh Rajpurohit is an Indian politician from the Bharatiya Janata Party and a two term member of the Rajasthan Legislative Assembly representing the Ahore Vidhan Sabha constituency of Rajasthan.
