= Hotigaon =

Village in Rajasthan, India

- Village
- Hoti Gaon
- Location in Rajasthan, India Hotigaon (India)
- Coordinates: 24°52′49″N 71°34′16″E
- Country: India
- State: Rajasthan
- District: Jalore

Area
  - Total: 1,281 ha (3,170 acres)

Population (2011)
  - Total: 752

Languages
  - Official: Marwari language & Hindi
- Time zone: UTC+5:30 (IST)
- PIN: 343041
- ISO 3166 code: RJ-IN
- Vehicle registration: RJ-46

Hotigaon is a village in the Jalore district in Rajasthan, India. Hotigaon has a total population of 752 peoples according to Census 2011. Hotigaon 33km away from district headquarter Sanchore.

Phool Mukteshwar Temple is very famous where a fair is held here once a year. Along with this, this model village was adopted by MP Devji Patel.
