= Susheela Laxman Bangaru =

Indian politician

Member of Parliament
- In office 17 May 2004 – 18 May 2009
- Preceded by: Buta Singh
- Succeeded by: Devji Patel
- Constituency: Jalore

Personal details
- Born: 14 March 1948 Jhansi, United Provinces (now Uttar Pradesh), India
- Died: 3 March 2018 (aged 69) Hyderabad, Telangana, India
- Party: Bharatiya Janata Party
- Spouse: Bangaru Laxman (m. 1971; died 2014)
- Children: 4

Susheela Laxman Bangaru (14 March 1948 – 3 March 2018) was an Indian politician. She was a member of Lok Sabha from 2004 to 2009, elected from Jalore constituency in Rajasthan as a candidate of Bharatiya Janata Party. She was the wife of politician Bangaru Laxman.
