= Sanchore Assembly constituency =

Political division of Rajasthan, India

Coordinates: 24.75°N 71.78°E

Sanchore
- Constituency No. 144 for the Rajasthan Legislative Assembly

Constituency details
- Country: India
- Region: North India
- State: Rajasthan
- District: Sanchore
- Established: 1951
- Reservation: None

Member of Legislative Assembly
- 16th Rajasthan Legislative Assembly
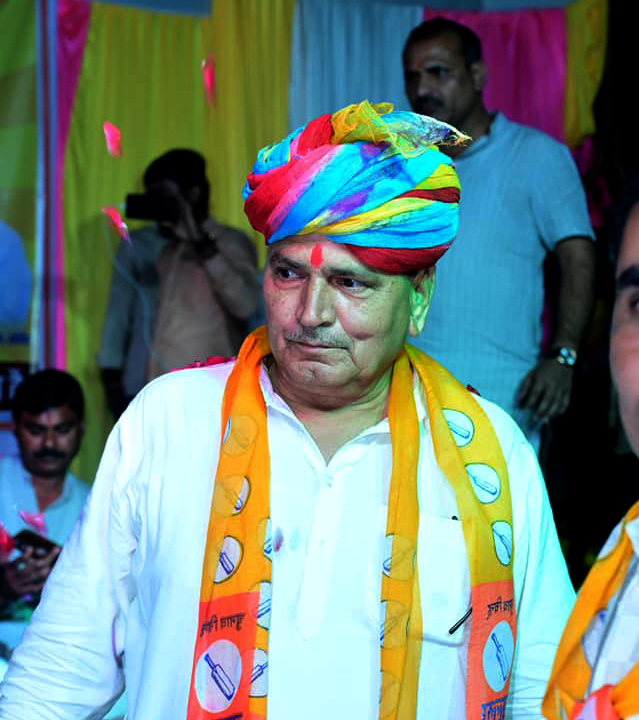
- Incumbent Jivaram Choudhary
- Party: Independent

Sanchore Assembly constituency is one of constituencies of Rajasthan Legislative Assembly in the Jalore Lok Sabha constituency.

== Member of the Legislative Assembly ==
Election	Member	Party
1952	Kishor Singh	Independent
1957	Laxmi Chand	Ram Rajya Party
1962	Raghu Nath Bishnoi	Indian National Congress
1967	Raghu Nath Bishnoi	Indian National Congress
1972	Raghu Nath Bishnoi	Indian National Congress
1977	Raghu Nath Bishnoi	Indian National Congress
1980	Kanak Raj Mehta	Independent
1985	Raghu Nath Bishnoi	Indian National Congress
1990	Laxmi Chand Mehta	Bharatiya Janata Party
1993	Heera lal Bishnoi	Indian National Congress
1998	Heera Lal Bishnoi	Indian National Congress
2003	Jivaram Choudhary	Bharatiya Janata Party
2008	Jivaram Choudhary	Independent
2013	Sukhram Bishnoi	Indian National Congress
2018	Sukhram Bishnoi	Indian National Congress
2023	Jivaram Choudhary	Independent

== Election results ==
=== 2023 ===
2023 Rajasthan Legislative Assembly election: Sanchore
Party	Candidate	Votes	%	±%
Independent	Jiva Ram Choudhary	95,518	37.03	
INC	Sukhram Vishnoi	90,847	35.22	−1.97
BJP	Devji Patel	30,535	11.84	−13.97
BSP	Shamsher Ali Sayyed	26,108	10.12	+0.24
RLP	Suresh Sagar	4,612	1.79	
AAP	Ram Lal Bishnoi	4,292	1.66	
NOTA	None of the above	1,940	0.75	−0.66
Majority		4,671	1.81	−9.57
Turnout		257,977	81.81	+0.42
Independent gain from INC		Swing		

=== 2018 ===
2018 Rajasthan Legislative Assembly election: Sanchore
Party	Candidate	Votes	%	±%
INC	Sukhram Bishnoi	84,689	37.19	
BJP	Dana Ram Choudhary	58,771	25.81	
Independent	Jivaram Choudhary	49,693	21.82	
BSP	Ramesh Kumar	22,496	9.88	
NOTA	None of the above	3,209	1.41	
Majority		25,918	11.38	
Turnout		227,740	81.39	
INC gain from		Swing		

== See also ==
- Member of the Legislative Assembly (India)
