= Buta Singh =

Indian politician (1934–2021)

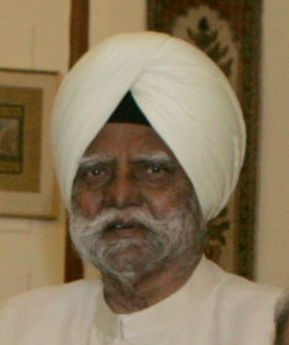
- Singh in 2012

Minister of Home Affairs
- In office 1986–1989
- Prime Minister: Rajiv Gandhi
- Preceded by: P. V. Narasimha Rao
- Succeeded by: Mufti Mohammad Sayeed

Minister of Agriculture Minister of Rural Development
- In office 1984–1986
- Prime Minister: Rajiv Gandhi

Governor of Bihar
- In office 5 November 2004 – 29 January 2006
- Preceded by: Rama Jois
- Succeeded by: Gopalkrishna Gandhi

Chairman National Commission for Scheduled Castes
- In office 2007–2010
- Prime Minister: Manmohan Singh
- Preceded by: Suraj Bhan
- Succeeded by: P. L. Punia

Minister of Parliamentary Affairs Minister of Sports
- In office 1982–1984
- Prime Minister: Indira Gandhi

Chairman Asian Games Special Organizing Committee
- In office 1981–1982
- Prime Minister: Indira Gandhi

Minister of Civil Supplies, Consumer Affairs and Public Distribution
- In office 1995–1996
- Prime Minister: P.V. Narasimha Rao

Personal details
- Born: 21 March 1934 Mustafapur, Punjab, British India (now India)
- Died: 2 January 2021 (aged 86) New Delhi, India
- Party: Indian National Congress
- Spouse: Manjit Kaur
- Children: Arvinder Singh Lovely (son) Sarabjot Singh (son) Gurkirat Kaur (daughter)

Sardar Buta Singh (21 March 1934 – 2 January 2021) was an Indian politician and a senior leader of the Indian National Congress. He was a Union Home Minister of India, Governor of Bihar and was chairman of the National Commission for Scheduled Castes from 2007 to 2010.

== Early life ==
Buta Singh was born on 21 March 1934 in Mazhabi Sikh family at Mustafapur, Jalandhar district, Punjab, British India. He was educated at Lyallpur Khalsa College in Jalandhar, from where he was awarded a B.A. (Hons), and at Guru Nanak Khalsa College in Bombay, where he earned an M.A. Singh then gained a Ph.D. from Bundelkhand University. He married Manjit Kaur in 1964; the couple had three children.

He worked as a journalist before entering politics. He contested his first elections as an Akali Dal member and joined the Indian National Congress in the late 1960s at the time when that party was split.

== Political career ==
Singh was first elected to the Lok Sabha in 1962, for the Moga constituency. He was subsequently elected to the 4th (from Ropar in 1967), 5th, 7th, 8th (from Jalore), 10th (1991), 12th and 13th Lok Sabhas. He was involved with the Congress Party since Jawaharlal Nehru was Prime Minister and he was close to former Indian prime ministers Indira Gandhi and Rajiv Gandhi. But he was first elected to the Indian Parliament from the Moga constituency as Akali Dal candidate, defeating his Congress opponent.

He switched to Ropar constituency in 1967, this time as a Congress candidate, and was elected from there to Lok Sabha a couple of times. He became General Secretary of the All India Congress Committee (AICC) General Secretary (1978–1980), Home Minister of India and later Governor of Bihar (2004–2006). Other portfolios that he has held include those for railways, commerce, parliamentary affairs, sports, shipping, agriculture, communications and housing. He was chairman of the National Commission for Scheduled Castes (ranked as Cabinet Minister) from 2007 to 2010.

He wrote a book Punjabi Speaking State – A Critical Analysis and a collection of articles on Punjabi literature and Sikh history. Indira Gandhi chose him to select a new party symbol when Congress was split. He was very closely involved with her in Operation Blue Star and as a minister he oversaw reconstruction of the Golden Temple following that exercise. His name was also in the finalists for the post of President of India along with Giani Zail Singh in the Indira era. He was also the chairperson of Asian Games organizing committee when the competition was held in India in 1982.

He contested 2014 Lok Sabha election from Jalore (Lok Sabha constituency) as an independent, backed by Samajwadi Party, but he came third.

== Controversies ==
In 1998, as Communications Minister he was indicted in the JMM bribery case, and forced to resign.

As the Governor of Bihar, Singh's decision to recommend the dissolution of the Bihar Assembly in 2005 was sharply criticised by the Supreme Court of India. The court ruled that Singh had acted in haste and misled the federal cabinet because he did not want a particular party claiming to form the government, to come to power.

Singh, however, claimed that the party was resorting to unfair means to secure support to form the government. On 26 January 2006, Singh sent a fax to Abdul Kalam offering to resign his post. The next day he left office and was replaced temporarily by West Bengal governor Gopalkrishna Gandhi.

== Death ==
Singh died in New Delhi from complications of a cerebral haemorrhage on 2 January 2021, at age 86.

== Positions held ==
1. 1962 : Elected to 3rd Lok Sabha, from Moga seat, as Akali Dal candidate
2. 1966–68 : Member, Public Accounts Committee.
3. 1967 : Re-elected to 4th Lok Sabha (2nd term) as Congress candidate, Ropar (Lok Sabha constituency)
4. 1971 : Re-elected to 5th Lok Sabha (3rd term), from Ropar (Lok Sabha constituency)
5. 1971 : Chairman, Committee on the Welfare of Scheduled Castes and Scheduled Tribes
6. 1973–74 : Convenor, All India Congress Committee (Indira) [AICC(I)], Harijan Cell.
7. 1974–76 : Union Deputy Minister, Railways.
8. 1976–77 : Union Deputy Minister, Commerce.
9. 1978–80 : General-Secretary, AICC(I).
10. 1980 : Re-elected to 7th Lok Sabha (4th term), from Ropar (Lok Sabha constituency)
11. 1980–82 : Union Minister of State, Shipping and Transport.
12. 1982 : Union Minister of State, Supply and Rehabilitation (Independent Charge).
13. 1982–83 : Union Minister of State, Supply and Sports (Independent Charge).
14. 1983–84 : Union Cabinet Minister, Parliamentary Affairs, Sports and Works and Housing.
15. 1984 : Re-elected to 8th Lok Sabha (5th term), from Jalore (Lok Sabha constituency)
16. 1984–85 : Union Cabinet Minister, Agriculture and Rural Development.
17. 1985–86 : Union Cabinet Minister, Agriculture.
18. 1986–89 : Union Cabinet Minister, Home Affairs.
19. 1991 : Re-elected to 10th Lok Sabha (6th term), Jalore (Lok Sabha constituency)
20. 1994–95 : Chairman, Parliamentary Committee on Defence.
21. 1995–96 : Union Cabinet Minister, Civil Supplies, Consumer Affairs and Public Distribution.
22. 1998 : Re-elected to 12th Lok Sabha (7th term), Jalore (Lok Sabha constituency)
23. Mar–Apr. 1998: Union Cabinet Minister, Communications.
24. 1998–99 : Member, Committee on Subordinate Legislation and Member, Committee on Finance.
25. 1999 : Re-elected to 13th Lok Sabha (8th term), Jalore (Lok Sabha constituency)
26. 1999–2000 : Member, Committee of Privileges and Member, Committee on Communications.
27. 1999–2001 : Member, Committee on the Welfare of Scheduled Castes and Scheduled Tribes.
28. 2002–2003 : Chairman, Public Accounts Committee, Room No.-51, Parliament House, New Delhi.
29. 2004–2006 : Governor Of Bihar
30. 2006–2007 : Permanent Invitee Congress Working Committee
31. 2007–2010 : Chairman National Commission For Scheduled Castes (rank of Cabinet Minister)

Lok Sabha
Preceded by Constituency does not exist	Member of Parliament for Ropar; 1967–1977	Succeeded by Basant Singh Khalsa
Preceded by Basant Singh Khalsa	Member of Parliament for Ropar; 1980–1984	Succeeded by Charanjit Singh
Preceded by Virda Ram Phulwariya	Member of Parliament for Jalore; 1984–1989	Succeeded by Kailash Chandra Meghwal
Preceded by Kailash Chandra Meghwal	Member of Parliament for Jalore; 1991–1996	Succeeded by Parsaram Meghwal
Preceded by Parsaram Meghwal	Member of Parliament for Jalore; 1998–2004	Succeeded by Susheela Laxman Bangaru
Political offices
Preceded by Bhishma Narain Singh	Minister of Parliamentary Affairs; 29 January 1983 – 31 December 1984	Succeeded by H. K. L. Bhagat
Preceded by Rao Birender Singh	Minister of Agriculture; 1984 – 12 May 1986	Succeeded by Gurdial Singh Dhillon
Preceded by P. V. Narasimha Rao	Minister of Home Affairs; 12 May 1986 – 2 December 1989	Succeeded by Mufti Mohammad Sayeed
Preceded by Ved Marwah; Acting	Governor of Bihar; 5 November 2004 – 29 January 2006	Succeeded by Gopalkrishna Gandhi
