= Surajratan Fatehchand Damani =

Indian politician (1912–1995)

Sujan Ratan Fatehchand Damani

Member of Parliament, Lok Sabha
- In office 1957–1962
- Constituency: Jalore
- In office 1967–1980

Personal details
- Born: 14 July 1912
- Died: 13 January 1995 (aged 82)
- Party: INC
- Children: 1 son, 3 daughters
- Profession: Industrialist
- As of 23 February, 2012

S R Damani or Sujan Ratan Fatehchand Damani (14 July 1912, in Bikaner Rajasthan – 13 January 1995) was a member of the 2nd Lok Sabha of India from the Jalore constituency of Rajasthan and a member of the Indian National Congress (INC) political party. He later become member of 4th, 5th and 6th Lok Sabha from the Solapur constituency of Maharashtra

He founded a charitable Trust for the educational institutions, free maternity and child-welfare centres, for awarding scholarships for higher studies and other philanthropic purposes. He worked as member of Executive Committee of Congress Party in Parliament and its treasurer during 1969–1971.
