= Parsaram Meghwal =

Indian politician

Member of the Lok Sabha for Jalore
- In office 1996–1998
- Preceded by: Buta Singh
- Succeeded by: Buta Singh

Personal details
- Born: Madgaon, Jalore
- Died: July 21, 2021
- Party: Indian National Congress
- Spouse: Babita Meghwal

Parsaram Meghwal (30 October 1954 – 21 July 2021) was an Indian politician and a former member of parliament for the constituency of Jalore in Rajasthan.
