= Bhagraj Choudhary =

Indian politician (1936–2022)

Member of the Rajasthan Legislative Assembly
- In office 1985-1990, 1993-2003, 2008 – 2013
- Constituency: Ahore
- In office 1962-1967, 1972 – 1977
- Constituency: Raniwara

Minister of Forest, Environment and Climate Change
- In office 1998–2002

Personal details
- Born: 16 April 1936 Siwana, Barmer district, Rajasthan, India
- Died: 10 February 2022 (aged 85) Jalore, India
- Party: INC

Bhagraj Choudhary (16 April 1936 – 10 February 2022) was an Indian politician from Barmer, Rajasthan. He served as member of the Rajasthan Legislative Assembly for six terms representing Raniwara and Ahore constituency. He was a member of Indian National Congress.

He also served as Minister of Forest, Environment and Climate Change in Government of Rajasthan.

== Personal life ==
Choudhary born to Shri Modaram Choudhary on 16 April 1936 at Rakhi village near Siwana in Barmer district. He married Smt. Meera Bai. His educational qualifications are Bachelor of Arts and Bachelor of Laws and professionally he was an advocate. Choudhary died on 11 February 2022, at the age of 85.

== Political career ==
Chaudhary has been elected twice from Raniwara, firstly in 1962 and then in 1972 and four terms from Ahore, are 1985, 1993, 1998 and 2008. In 1985, he was elected as a Lok Dal candidate. Later he re-joined Indian National Congress. He also served as Minister of Forest, Environment and Climate Change in Government of Rajasthan.
