= Raniwara Assembly constituency =

Legislative Assembly constituency in Rajasthan State, India

Coordinates: 24.75°N 72.21°E

Raniwara
- Constituency No. 145 for the Rajasthan Legislative Assembly

Constituency details
- Country: India
- Region: North India
- State: Rajasthan
- District: Jalore
- Lok Sabha constituency: Jalore
- Established: 1957
- Total electors: 271,874
- Reservation: None

Member of Legislative Assembly
- 16th Rajasthan Legislative Assembly
- Incumbent Ratan Dewasi
- Party: Indian National Congress
- Elected year: 2023

Raniwara Assembly constituency is one of the 200 Legislative Assembly constituencies of Rajasthan state in India.

It is part of Jalore district. As of 2023 its representative is Ratan Dewasi of the Indian National Congress.

== Members of the Legislative Assembly ==
Election	Name	Party
2003	Arjun Singh Deora	Bharatiya Janata Party
2008	Ratan Dewasi	Indian National Congress
2013	Narayan Singh Dewal	Bharatiya Janata Party
2018	Narayan Singh Dewal	Bharatiya Janata Party
2023	Ratan Dewasi	Indian National Congress

== Election results ==
=== 2023 ===
2023 Rajasthan Legislative Assembly election: Raniwara
Party	Candidate	Votes	%	±%
INC	Ratan Devasi	112,681	52.76	+6.74
BJP	Narayan Singh Dewal	90,319	42.29	−5.56
ASP(KR)	Bharat Kumar	1,989	0.93	
BSP	Lakharam	1,947	0.91	−0.53
NOTA	None of the above	2,685	1.26	−0.43
Majority		22,362	10.47	+8.64
Turnout		213,585	78.56	+0.83
INC gain from BJP		Swing		

=== 2018 ===
Rajasthan Legislative Assembly Election, 2018: Raniwara
Party	Candidate	Votes	%	±%
BJP	Narayan Singh Dewal	88,887	47.85	
INC	Ratan Devasi	85,482	46.02	
BSP	Popat Lal Meghwal	2,675	1.44	
AAP	Babu Lal	2,195	1.18	
Independent	Bharat Kumar Meghwal	1,876	1.01	
NOTA	None of the above	3,148	1.69	
Majority		3,405	1.83	
Turnout		185,762	77.73	

== See also ==
- List of constituencies of the Rajasthan Legislative Assembly
- Jalore district
