= Sukhram Bishnoi =

Indian politician

- सुखराम बिश्नोई
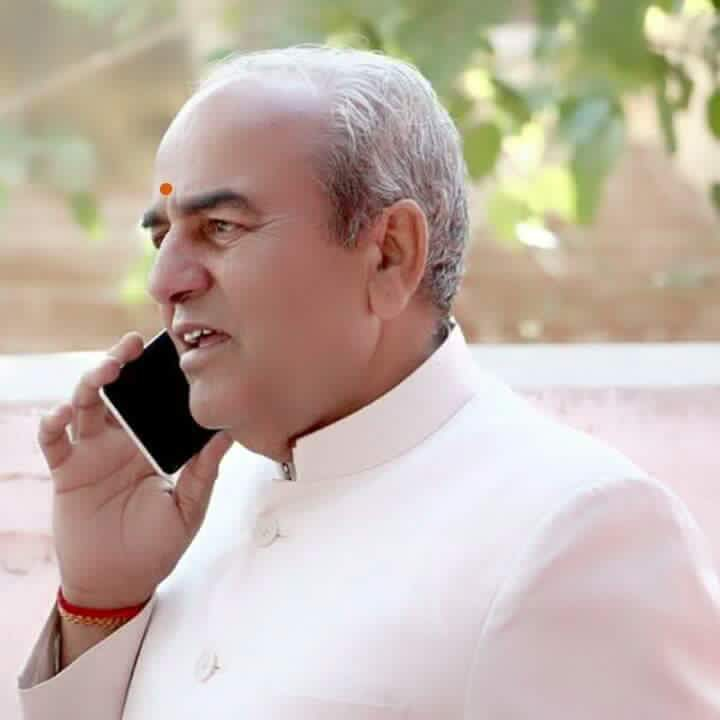

Minister of State Labour (Independent Charge) Factory & Boiler inspection (Independent Charge) Revenue Forest & Environment, Government of Rajasthan
- In office November 2021 – 3 Desember 2023

Minister of State Forest & Environment, Government of Rajasthan
- In office December 2018 – November 2021

Member of the Rajasthan Legislative Assembly
- In office 2013 – 3 Desember 2023
- Succeeded by: Jivaram Choudhary
- Constituency: Sanchore

Personal details
- Born: 3 May 1953 (age 72) Keriya Sanchore, Jalore, Rajasthan
- Party: Indian National Congress
- Spouse: Smt.Meera
- Children: 2 Sons & 1 Daughter
- Education: B.A., LL.B.
- Occupation: Advocate

Sukhram Bishnoi (born 3 May 1953) is an Indian politician & former State Minister of Government of Rajasthan from Rajasthan belonging to the Indian National Congress. He is a Member of the Rajasthan Legislative Assembly and represents the Sanchore constituency of Jalore district Rajasthan.

== Educational background ==
Bishnoi completed his primary and higher secondary education at his birthplace Sanchore, Rajasthan. He is a law graduate and has started his career as an advocate. As an advocate, he has served for more than 22 years to the poor and backward class of people. He provides free legal aid to the people who are socially and economically backward.

== Political career ==
His political journey was started in 1998 when he was elected to the post of Up Pradhan (Sanchore) and later, he was elected to the office of Pradhan (Sanchore) in 2002.

He was an Indian National Congress candidate in Sanchore for the 2008 Rajasthan Legislative Assembly. He received more than 35 percent of votes and trailed at second position. He was defeated by an Independent candidate by a margin of 2.32 percent.

He was elected to the Rajasthan Legislative Assembly for the constituency of Sanchore in 2013. He received 43.52 percent votes and defeated BJP candidate Jeevaram Choudhary by more than 24,043 votes.

He has served as member of house committee (Rajasthan Legislative Assembly) from 2014 to 2016 and is serving as member of house committee for a third term. He is a member of the Pradesh Congress Committee.

Again in 2018, he won from Sanchore Constituency with a margin of around 20k votes. He was Minister of State Forest & Environment in Government of Rajasthan during Congress Government.
