= Mirpur, Sirohi =

Mirpur Meerpur
- Village
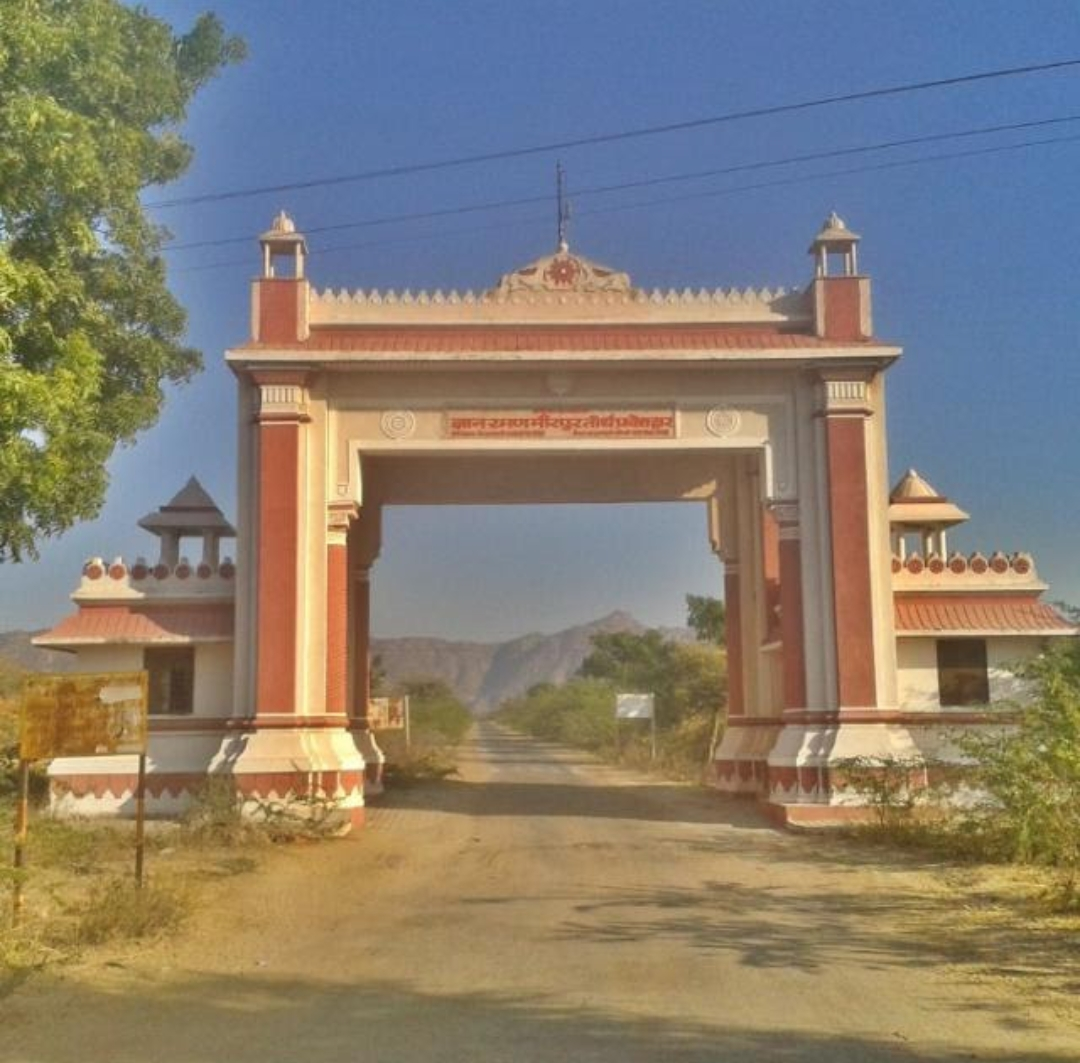
- Entrance Gate of Mirpur

- Location in Rajasthan, India Mirpur (India)
- Coordinates: 24°47′20″N 72°46′08″E
- Country: India
- State: Rajasthan
- District: Sirohi
- Founder: Thakur Ladu Singh
- Talukas: Sirohi

Government
  - Body: Gram Panchayat
- Time zone: UTC+5:30 (IST)
- PIN: 307001
- Telephone code: 02972
- ISO 3166 code: RJ-IN
- Vehicle registration: RJ-24
- Sex ratio: ♂/♀
- Lok Sabha constituency: Sirohi (Rajasthan Assembly Constituency)
- Vidhan Sabha constituency: Sirohi
- Civic agency: Gram Panchayat

Mirpur is a village located in the Sirohi District of Rajasthan, India. The village is known for its Jain tirtha called Mirpur Jain Temple and Mirpur Jahaj Temple. It is also the birthplace of the politician Thakur Jawan Singh Solanki.

The Mirpur Thikana was granted by Sirohi Maharaja to Thakur Ladu Singh Solanki for showing courage in the battlefield near Kailashnagar, Sirohi. So, Thakur Ladu Singh ji left his ancestral thikana which was in Mewar region to his new capital/thikana Mirpur.

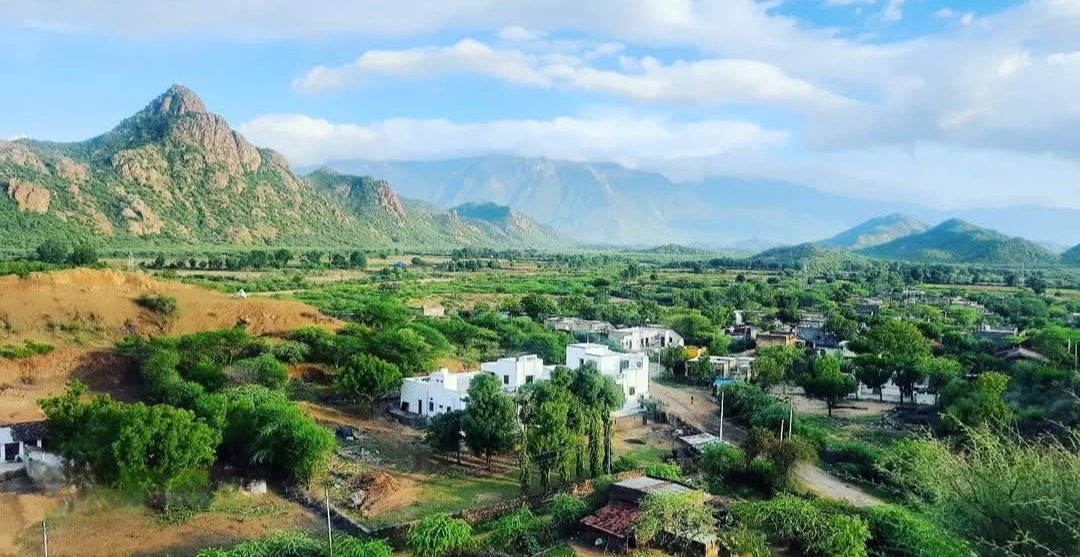
Mountain Range of Mirpur

In Rajasthan, there was an ancient city called Jirapalli Patan, where King Samprati had built a temple of Lord Parshvanath. In Vikram Samvat 808, King Hamir attacked the city and conquered its fort. King Hamir changed the name of Jirapalli Patan to Hamirgarh. Over time, the name gradually transformed from Hamirgarh to Hamirpur and from Hamirpur to Mirpur. Hamirpur was destroyed by Muslim invaders along with the Jain temple. Later on this village was granted to Thakur Ladu Singh.

Ruling Thakurs

Reign start	Reign end	Ruler
Not known	Not known	Not known
Not known	Not known	Not known
Not known	Not known	Thakur Udai Singh
		Thakur Ladu Singh
	1992	Thakur Jamat Singh
1992	30 November 2022	Thakur Narayan Singh
30 November 2022		Thakur Anirudh Pratap Singh

Today, the four existing Jain temples are evidence that Hamirpur was once a major cultural and commercial center of the Jain community.

This land became sacred with the birth of Shri Parshvachandrasuriji, the founder of Parshvagaccha, in the year 1536 Samvat. Then, in the same year, by composing the story of Maun Ekadashi, Saubhagyanandisuriji made this land radiant.

After 1796 AD, this city declined. As a result, the idols installed here were relocated to nearby villages. At that time, the idol of Godiji Parshwanath that was installed here was consecrated at the Paydhuni Jain temple in Mumbai.

About a hundred years ago, an idol was taken from here to Hadecha Nagar, which is now famous in Hadecha Nagar as Chhote Adinath.

The Hamirpura Parshwanath Bhagwan installed here is also renowned among the 108 Parshwanath pilgrimage sites as Bheedbhanjan Parshwanath. This is mentioned in a verse composed in Samvat 1881 by Khushalvijayji's disciple Uttamvijayji as follows: "हमीरपुरा पास प्रणमु वली नवलखा, भीडभंजन प्रभु भीड भांगे |दुःखभंजन अने डोकरीया नमुं, पास जिरावला जगता जागे ।।".

Currently, there are a total of 5 Jain temples here.

1. Main Shri Hamirpur Parshvanath Jain Temple (Mirpur Jain Temple)
2. Shri Suparshvanath Jain Temple
3. Shri Shantinath Jain Temple
4. Shri Shantinath Jain Temple (Ancient Mahavir Swami)
5. Shri Munisuvrat Swami Jain Temple (Mirpur Jahaj Temple)

The management of the above temples 1-4 is under the Seth Shri Kalyanji Parmanandji Pedhi located in Sirohi.

Other Main Temple

1. Vaastaan Ji Mahadev Temple, Built by Thakur Ladu Singh ji
2. Pishhwaanji Mahadev Temple (Famous for its Natural underground water Pond inside Temple)
3. Toonk Mata (Nandeshwari Mata Temple), located on Top of Mountain.
