= Ahore Assembly constituency =

Legislative Assembly constituency in Rajasthan State, India

Coordinates: 25.37°N 72.78°E

Ahore
- Constituency No. 141 for the Rajasthan Legislative Assembly

Constituency details
- Country: India
- Region: North India
- State: Rajasthan
- District: Jalore
- Lok Sabha constituency: Jalore
- Established: 1957
- Total electors: 271,455
- Reservation: None

Member of Legislative Assembly
- 16th Rajasthan Legislative Assembly
- Incumbent Chhagan Singh Rajpurohit
- Party: Bharatiya Janata Party
- Elected year: 2018

Ahore Assembly constituency is one of the 200 Legislative Assembly constituencies of Rajasthan state in India. It is in Jalore district.

== Members ==
Members of the Legislative Assembly for Ahore
Year	Member	Party
1957	Madho Singh	Indian National Congress
1962	Chhattra Singh	Akhil Bharatiya Ram Rajya Parishad
1967	Madho Singh	Indian National Congress
1972	Samundar Kanwar	Indian National Congress
1977	Gopal Singh	Janata Party
1980	Samundar Kanwar	Indian National Congress
1985	Bhagraj Choudhary	Bharatiya Lok Dal
1990	Gopal Singh	Indian National Congress
1993	Bhagraj Choudhary	Indian National Congress
1998	Bhagraj Choudhary	Indian National Congress
2003	Shankar Singh Rajpurohit	Bharatiya Janata Party
2008	Bhagraj Choudhary	Indian National Congress
2013	Shankar Singh Rajpurohit	Bharatiya Janata Party
2018	Chhagan Singh Rajpurohit	Bharatiya Janata Party
2023	Chhagan Singh Rajpurohit	Bharatiya Janata Party

== Election results ==
=== 2023 ===
Rajasthan Legislative Assembly Election, 2023: Ahore
Party	Candidate	Votes	%	±%
BJP	Chhagan Singh Rajpurohit	83,259	49.63	+0.38
INC	Saroj Choudhary	72,044	42.94	+14.1
NOTA	None of the above	2,999	1.79	−0.26
Majority		11,215	6.69	−13.72
Turnout		167,769	61.8	−0.08
BJP hold		Swing		

=== 2018 ===
Rajasthan Legislative Assembly Election, 2018: Ahore
Party	Candidate	Votes	%	±%
BJP	Chhagan Singh Rajpurohit	74,928	49.25	
INC	Savaram Patel	43,880	28.84	
BSP	Pankaj	22,808	14.99	
Independent	Jagdish Choudhary	2,684	1.76	
NOTA	None of the above	3,111	2.05	
Majority		31,048	20.41	
Turnout		152,126	61.88	

== See also ==
- List of constituencies of the Rajasthan Legislative Assembly
- Jalore district
