= Tara Bhandari =

Indian politician

Deputy Speaker of the Rajasthan Legislative Assembly
- In office 28 July 1998 - 30 November 1998

Member of the Rajasthan Legislative Assembly
- In office 1990 - 1998
- Constituency: Sirohi

Personal details
- Born: 21 January 1945 (age 81) Sirohi, Rajasthan, India
- Party: Bharatiya Janata Party
- Children: 5

Tara Bhandari (21 January 1945) is an Indian politician who briefly served as the deputy speaker of Rajasthan Legislative Assembly. She twice elected to the Rajasthan Legislative Assembly from Sirohi. She is a member of the Bharatiya Janata Party.
