= Narayan Singh Dewal =

Indian politician

Member of the Rajasthan Legislative Assembly
- In office 2013–2023
- Succeeded by: Ratan Dewasi
- Constituency: Raniwara

Personal details
- Born: 5 August 1964 (age 61) Pahadpura, Rajasthan
- Party: BJP
- Spouse: Sunita Kanwar
- Children: 2
- Relatives: Ukh Singh Dewal
- Education: Graduated
- Occupation: Member of the Legislative Assembly

Narayan Singh Dewal (born 5 August 1964) is a Member of the Legislative Assembly (MLA) from Raniwara, Rajasthan & former state Vice President of Bhartiya Janta Party, Rajasthan, India. He is a member of the Bharatiya Janata Party and was elected as an MLA in 2013 as a candidate of that party, with a margin of 32,652 votes. In 2018, he was again re-elected from the same constituency, with a margin of 3,645 votes.
