= Laxmi Barupal =

Indian politician

MLA
- Constituency: Desuri

Personal details
- Born: Jaipur, Rajasthan

Laxmi Barupal as an Indian politician and a leader of the Bharatiya Janata Party. She is a former Member of Legislative Assembly from Desuri constituency in Rajasthan. She is daughter of Hukam Ram Meghwal, former member of Parliament.

== Education ==
Barupal is a Bachelor of Arts from Maharshi Dayanand University.
