= Jivaram Choudhary =

Indian politician

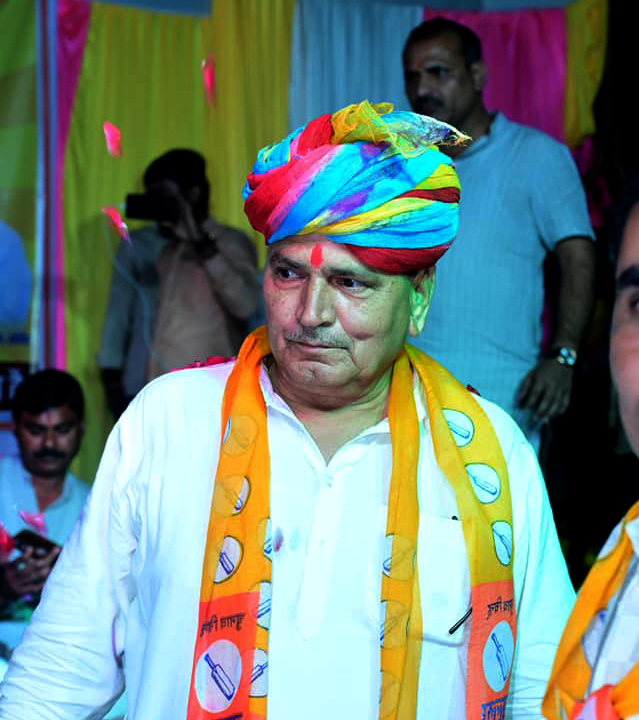

Member of the Rajasthan Legislative Assembly
- Incumbent
- Assumed office 2023
- Preceded by: Sukhram Bishnoi
- Constituency: Sanchore
- In office 2003–2013
- Succeeded by: Sukhram Bishnoi
- Constituency: Sanchore

Personal details
- Born: Sanchore, Jalore, Rajasthan
- Party: Independent

Jivaram Choudhary is an Indian politician serving as a member of the Rajasthan Legislative Assembly from Sanchore constituency of Jalore district.
