= Sanyam Lodha =

Indian politician

Member of the Rajasthan Legislative Assembly
- In office 1998 - 2008
- Succeeded by: Otaram Dewasi
- Constituency: Sirohi, Rajasthan
- In office 17 Dec 2018 - 3 December 2023
- Succeeded by: Otaram Dewasi
- Constituency: Sirohi, Rajasthan

Personal details
- Born: 20 January 1965 (age 61) Pali, Rajasthan
- Party: Indian National Congress
- Education: B.Com (Rajasthan University); LLB (Jai Narain Vyas University)

Sanyam Lodha (born 20 January 1965) is an Indian politician. He was elected to the Rajasthan Legislative Assembly for three terms from Sirohi. He is a member of the Indian National Congress.
