= Chhagan Singh =

Indian politician

Member of the Rajasthan Legislative Assembly
- In office 2018–Incumbent
- Preceded by: Shankar Singh Rajpurohit
- Constituency: Ahore

Personal details
- Party: Bharatiya Janata Party
- Profession: MLA, politician

Chhagan Singh won 2018 Rajasthan Legislative Assembly election with margin of 31,048 votes from Ahore Assembly constituency of the Rajasthan Legislative Assembly in the Jalore district.
