= Ratan Dewasi Desai =

Indian politician

Member of the Rajasthan Legislative Assembly
- Incumbent
- Assumed office 2023
- Preceded by: Narayan Singh Dewal
- Constituency: Raniwara
- In office 2008–2013
- Succeeded by: Narayan Singh Dewal
- Constituency: Raniwara

Personal details
- Born: 25 September 1975 (age 50) Mount Abu, Sirohi District, Rajasthan
- Party: Indian National Congress
- Spouse: Viraj Desai (m. 1997)
- Occupation: Politician

Ratan Dewasi Desai (born 25 September 1975) is an Indian politician. He is a member of All India Congress Committee and state spokesperson of Rajasthan State Congress. He has been an MLA from Raniwara constituency in the Rajasthan Assembly elections, 2008 and Deputy Chief Whip (Minister of State) in the Ashok Gehlot government.

He was elected MLA from Raniwara constituency in the 2008 assembly elections and since 2011 has been the government deputy chief whip in the then Ashok Gehlot government. At present, he is leader of the Congress party in Jalore and Sirohi districts of western Rajasthan.

== Personal, early life and background ==
Ratan Dewasi was born on 25 September 1975 in Mount Abu, Sirohi district of Rajasthan. His father's name is Shankarlal Dewasi and his wife's name is Viraj Dewasi. Dewasi has been a bright student since childhood. He is a diploma in hotel management degree holder.

== Career ==
Ratan Dewasi first started politics as a student leader by joining the student political organization National Student Union of India (a unit of the Congress Party). A pioneer in protest and protest against the administration and in view of his leadership and zeal, the party High Command in 1997 entrusted the responsibility of district president of Sirohi District, N.S.U.I.

=== Rajasthan Assembly elections ===
He has been elected to the Rajasthan Legislative Assembly elections for two terms. He was elected in 2008 for the first term and then in 2023 from Raniwara as a member of the Indian National Congress.
