= Devji Patel =

Indian politician (born 1976)

Devji M. Patel
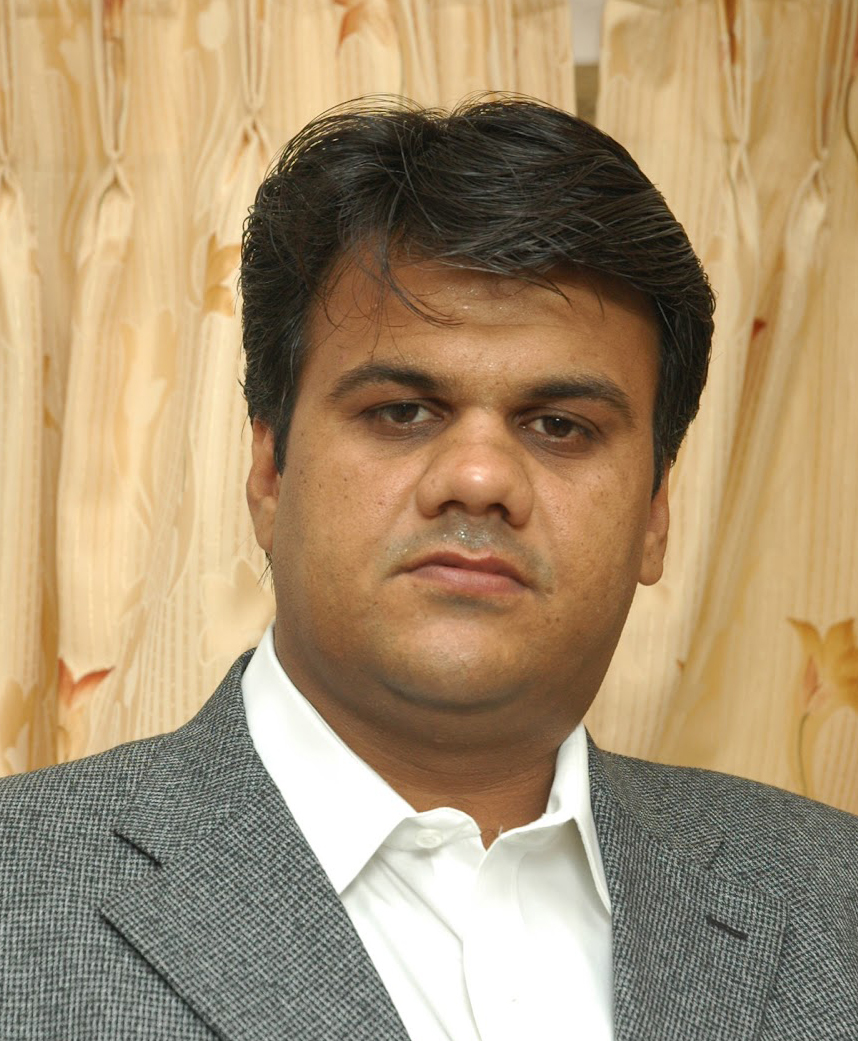
- A portrait of Devji Mansingram Patel

Member of the Lok Sabha
- In office 16 May 2009 – 4 June 2024
- Preceded by: B. Susheela
- Succeeded by: Lumbaram Choudhary
- Constituency: Jalore

Personal details
- Born: 25 September 1976 (age 49) Jalore, Rajasthan, India
- Party: Bharatiya Janata Party
- Spouse: Smt. Indira
- Children: 1 Son & 1 Daughter
- Website: www.devjipatel.com

Devji Mansingram Patel (born 25 September 1976) is a member of the Lok Sabha, the lower house of parliament of India. He was elected in 2009 from Jalore (Lok Sabha constituency) in Rajasthan as a candidate of the Bharatiya Janata Party. He again won the elections in 2014 and got elected for the third time.
