= C D Deval =

Indian politician (b. 1938)

Member of Rajasthan Legislative Assembly
- In office 2003–2008
- Succeeded by: -
- Constituency: Raipur Assembly constituency
- Preceded by: Hira Singh Chaouhan

Personal details
- Born: 30 December 1938 (age 87) Pali, Rajasthan
- Party: Indian National Congress
- Children: 5
- Education: B.A.(1958); M.A.(1960); LL.B.
- Alma mater: Rajasthan University
- Occupation: Politician; Administrator; Social Activist
- Website: C D Deval on Facebook

C D Deval (born 30 December 1938) is an Indian politician, Congress leader and former IAS officer from Rajasthan. He has served as the Member of Rajasthan Legislative Assembly from the Raipur Constituency during 2003-08. He entered administrative service first as a Tehsildar and selected for RAS in 1963. In 1984, he was promoted to the IAS. He retired as an IAS officer in 1996.

During his tenure as RAS officer, he was twice elected as the President of RAS Officers Association. Since 2013, he has been leading Marwar Prantiya Charan Mahasabha, a social organization of the Charan community.
