= Mirpur Jahaj Temple =

Coordinates: 24°47′29″N 72°45′50″E

Mirpur Jahaj Temple (Shri Munisuvrat Swami Jain Temple) is a Jain temple located in Mirpur, Sirohi, Rajasthan, India. It is built in the form of a ship.

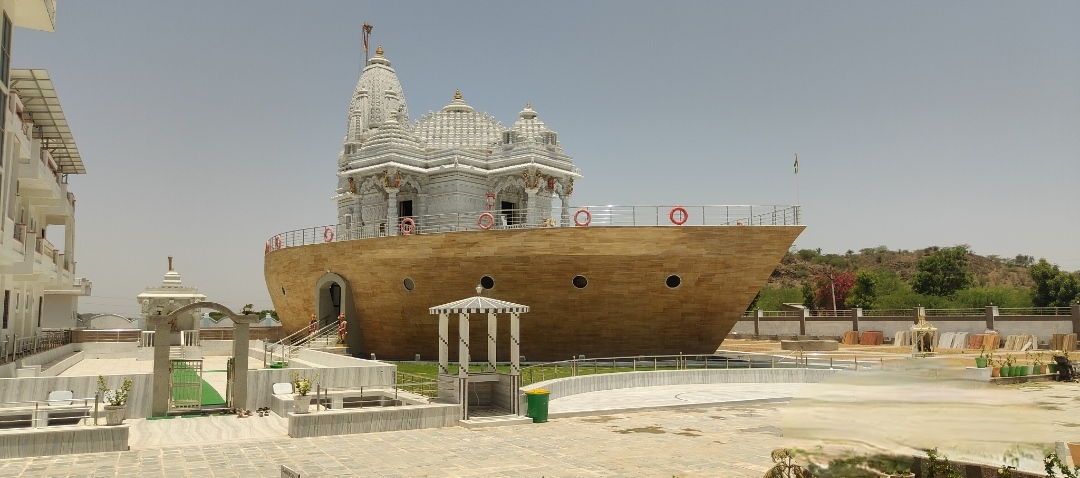
Mirpur Jahaj Temple

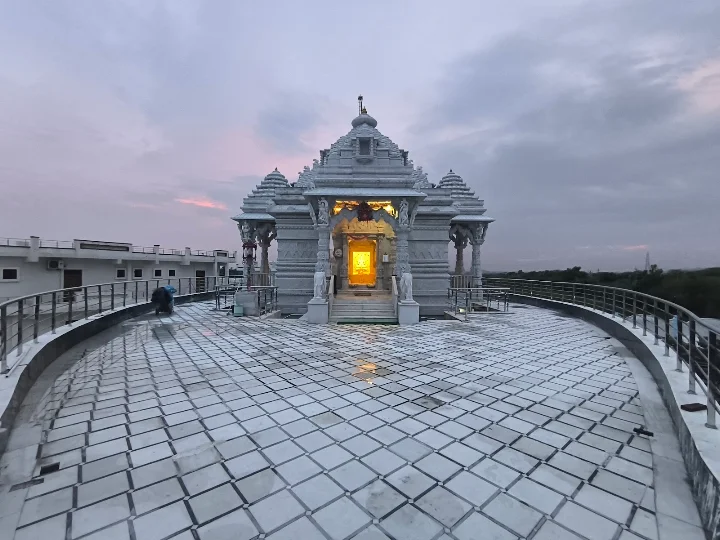
Top view of Mirpur Jahaj Temple
