= Samaram Garasiya =

Indian politician

- समाराम गरासिया

Member of 12th Rajasthan Assembly
- In office 2003–2008
- Preceded by: Lala Ram Garasiya
- Succeeded by: Ganga Ben Garasiya
- Constituency: Pindwara-Abu

Member of 14th Rajasthan Assembly
- In office 2013–2018
- Preceded by: Ganga Ben Garasiya
- Constituency: Pindwara-Abu

Member of 15th Rajasthan Assembly
- In office 2018–2013
- Constituency: Pindwara-Abu

Member of 16th Rajasthan Assembly
- Incumbent
- Assumed office 2023
- Preceded by: Leelaram Grasiya
- Constituency: Pindwara-Abu

Personal details
- Party: Bhartiya Janta Party
- Occupation: Politician

Samaram Garasiya is an Indian politician currently serving as a member of the 16th Rajasthan Legislative Assembly. He is a member of the Bhartiya Janta Party and represents the Pindwara-Abu Assembly constituency in Sirohi district.

He previously served as a member of the 12th Rajasthan Legislative Assembly, the 14th Rajasthan Legislative Assembly, and the 15th Rajasthan Legislative Assembly, also representing Pindwara-Abu Assembly constituency.

== Career ==
Following the 2023 Rajasthan Legislative Assembly election, he was elected as an MLA from the Pindwara-Abu Assembly constituency, defeating Leelaram Grasiya, the candidate from the Indian National Congress (INC), by a margin of 13,094 votes.
