= Otaram Dewasi =

Indian politician

Minister of State, Government of Rajasthan
- Incumbent
- Assumed office 30 December 2023
- Governor: Kalraj Mishra; Haribhau Bagade
- Chief Minister: Bhajan Lal Sharma
- Ministry and Departments: List: Panchayati Raj; Rural Development; Disaster Management, Relief & Civil Defense
- Preceded by: Rajendra Singh Gudha
- In office 27 October 2014 – 17 December 2018
- Chief Minister: Vasundhara Raje
- Ministry and Departments: List: Devasthan; Cow Husbandry

Member of the Rajasthan Legislative Assembly
- Incumbent
- Assumed office 3 December 2023
- Preceded by: Sanyam Lodha
- Constituency: Sirohi
- In office 2008–2018
- Preceded by: Sanyam Lodha
- Succeeded by: Sanyam Lodha
- Constituency: Sirohi

Personal details
- Born: 10 October 1964 (age 61) Mundara, Rajasthan, India
- Party: Bharatiya Janata Party
- Spouse: Amia Devi (m. 1980)
- Children: 4
- Education: 8th Pass
- Alma mater: Rajkiya Madhyamik School, Mundara, Tehsil Bali, District Pali, Rajasthan
- Occupation: Politician, priest
- Website: www.otaramdewasi.com

Otaram dewasi

Otaram Dewasi (born 10 October 1964) is an Indian politician serving as Minister of State in the Government of Rajasthan, overseeing Panchayati Raj, Rural Development, and Disaster Management since December 2023. He is a member of the Bharatiya Janata Party (BJP) and represents the Sirohi Assembly constituency in the Rajasthan Legislative Assembly.

== Early life and education ==
Dewasi was born in Mundara, Rajasthan. He studied up to the 8th standard at Rajkiya Madhyamik School in Mundara, Tehsil Bali, District Pali. In 1987, he briefly served in the Rajasthan Police as a constable, later returning to religious and community service.

== Political career ==
Dewasi joined the Bharatiya Janata Party in 2003. In 2008, he was elected as a Member of the Rajasthan Legislative Assembly from the Sirohi constituency and re-elected in 2013 and 2023. He lost the 2018 election.

== Ministerial positions ==
Dewasi has held the following ministerial roles in the Government of Rajasthan:

- Minister of Devasthan and Cow Husbandry (2014–2018) under the Second Raje ministry
- Minister of State (Independent Charge) for Panchayati Raj, Rural Development, Disaster Management, Relief & Civil Defense (from 30 December 2023) in the Bhajan Lal Sharma ministry

== Electoral record ==
Election results
Year	Office	Constituency	Party	Votes	%	Opponent	Opponent Party	Votes	%	Result	Ref
2008	MLA	Sirohi	Bharatiya Janata Party	56,400	47.72	Sanyam Lodha	Indian National Congress	47,830	40.47	Won	
2013	MLA	Sirohi	Bharatiya Janata Party	82,098	52.54	Sanyam Lodha	Indian National Congress	57,659	36.90	Won	
2018	MLA	Sirohi	Bharatiya Janata Party	71,019	39.79	Sanyam Lodha	IND	81,272	45.53	Lost	
2023	MLA	Sirohi	Bharatiya Janata Party	114,729	56.64	Sanyam Lodha	Indian National Congress	78,924	38.96	Won	
