= Hukam Ram =

Indian politician

Member of parliament
- In office 1977–1980
- Preceded by: Narendra Kumar Sanghi
- Succeeded by: Virda Ram Phulwariya
- Constituency: Jalore

Personal details
- Born: 23 March 1926 (age 100) Bali, Pali
- Died: 2005
- Party: Janata Party
- Spouse: Kasturi Devi

Hukam Ram Meghwal (23 March 1926 – 2005) was an Indian member of parliament from Jalore constituency. He was a member of the Janata Party. He died due to heart attack on 12 May 2005.
