= Jawan Singh (politician) =

Indian politician

Thakur Jawan Singh Solanki
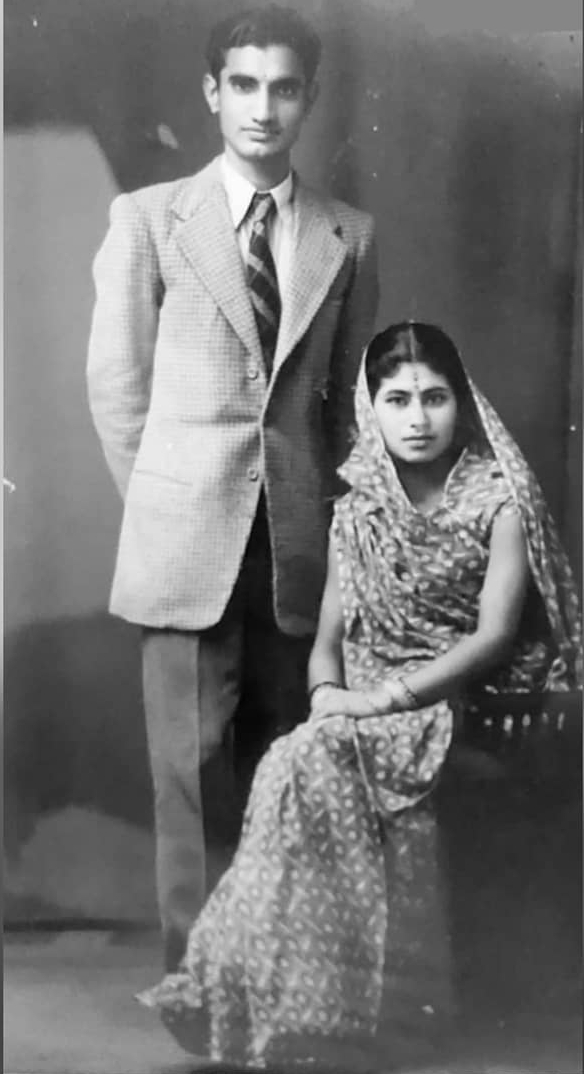
- Thakur Sahab Jawan Singh Solanki of Mirpur with his wife Thakurani Sahiba Annpurna Kanwar of Nai Garhi, Rewa, (M.P)

MLA
- In office 23 February 1952 – 23 March 1957
- Constituency: Sirohi

Personal details
- Born: 20 December 1920 Mirpur Thikana, Princely state of Sirohi, Rajputana, British India
- Died: 15 March 2003 (aged 82) Pali, Rajasthan
- Party: Ram Rajya Parishad (Independent) Bharatiya Janata Party
- Other political affiliations: (1952-57) सदस्य, पहली राजस्थान विधान सभा (23/02/1953-05/12/1956) सदस्य, याचिका समिति, राजस्थान विधान सभा (31/03/1953-12/12/1956) सदस्य, प्राक्‍कलन समिति, राजस्थान विधान सभा
- Education: Allahabad University (LL.B.); Birla Engineering College, Pilani (BA)
- Occupation: RAS, RJS, SDM, RTO, district magistrate, politician (MLA)
- Website: https://www.indianrajputs.com/view/mirpur

Thakur Jawan Singh Solanki (20 December 1920 – 15 March 2003) was the first MLA elected from the Sirohi constituency of Rajasthan, India under the Political Party Ram Rajya Parishad Created by Jodhpur Maharaja Hanwant Singh drawing a large number of erstwhile Rajput princes and nobles, he also fielded several aristocrats (thakurs) from among his erstwhile subjects and important landlords into his party in 1952.

Later the Party Merged into Bharatiya Janata party.

== Service ==
He entered politics and won as MLA with a margin of over 1 Lakh plus votes and completed his tenure. He was elected in 1952.

Then he joined Government Service and was Appointed as Judge at (Jaisalmer-jodhpur-Bikaner), Senior RAS officer, RJS and various other positions. He played a vital role in the Indo-Pak war during his tenure as SDM in Barmer, Rajasthan.

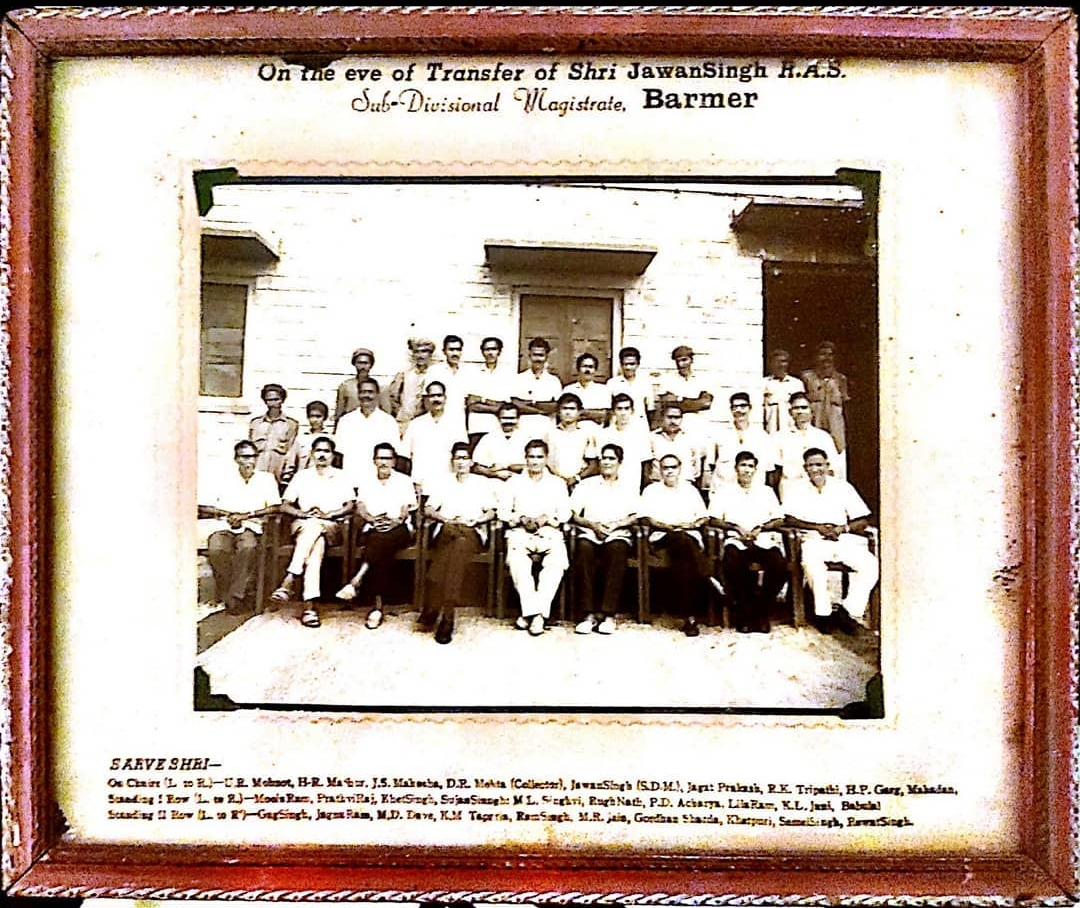
Transfer of Jawan Singh as SDM of Barmer

In 1972, he changed the fates of villagers of Nayabas, near Neem Ka Thana, which was once notorious for crimes like cattle theft, illegal liquor trade, and robberies. The stigma was particularly heavy for the Meena community. Nayabaswas under siege and surrounded by c. 5,000 policemen when Jawan Singh Ji entered the village and asked the villagers to educate themselves, saying that one day the villagers could also become RAS officers like himself. The Village Is an IAS factory Now, There are More Than 500 IAS/RAS/Govt. Officers, Thus Jawan Singh's Motivation Uplifted their Lifestyle and Changed the Scenario of Village.

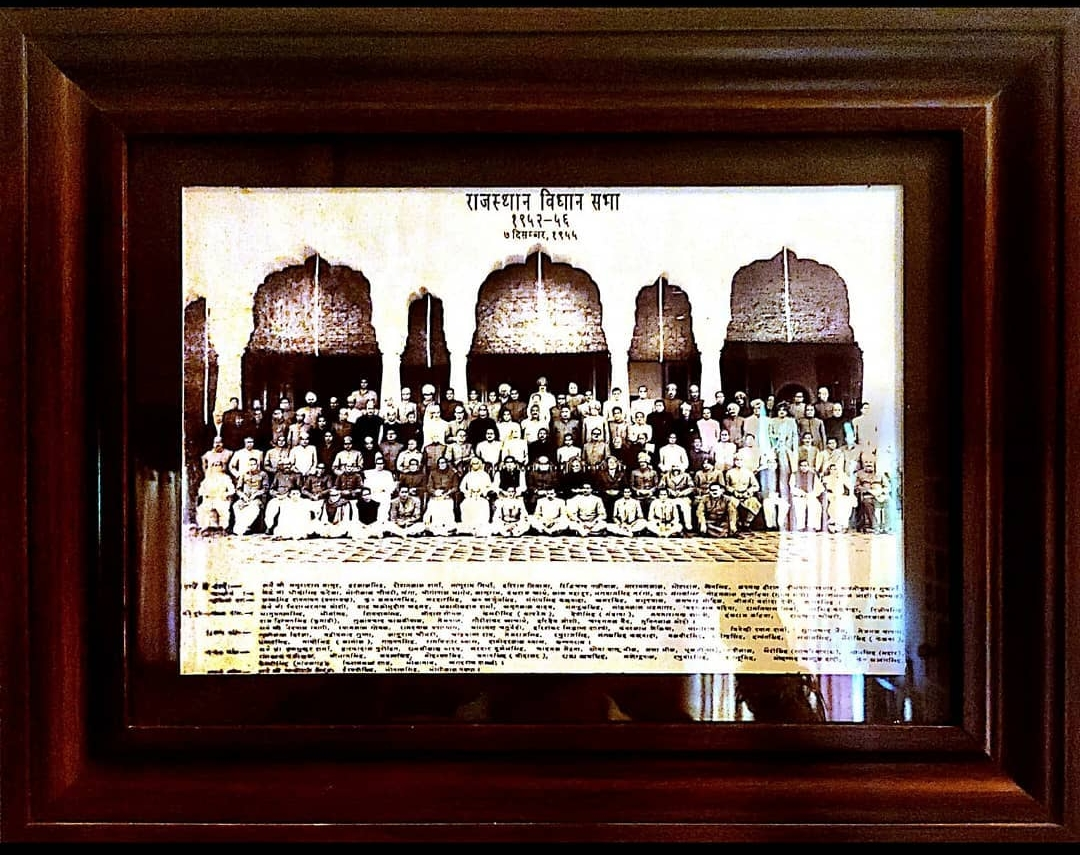
Jawan Singh with other MLA during the first Legislative Assembly of Rajasthan

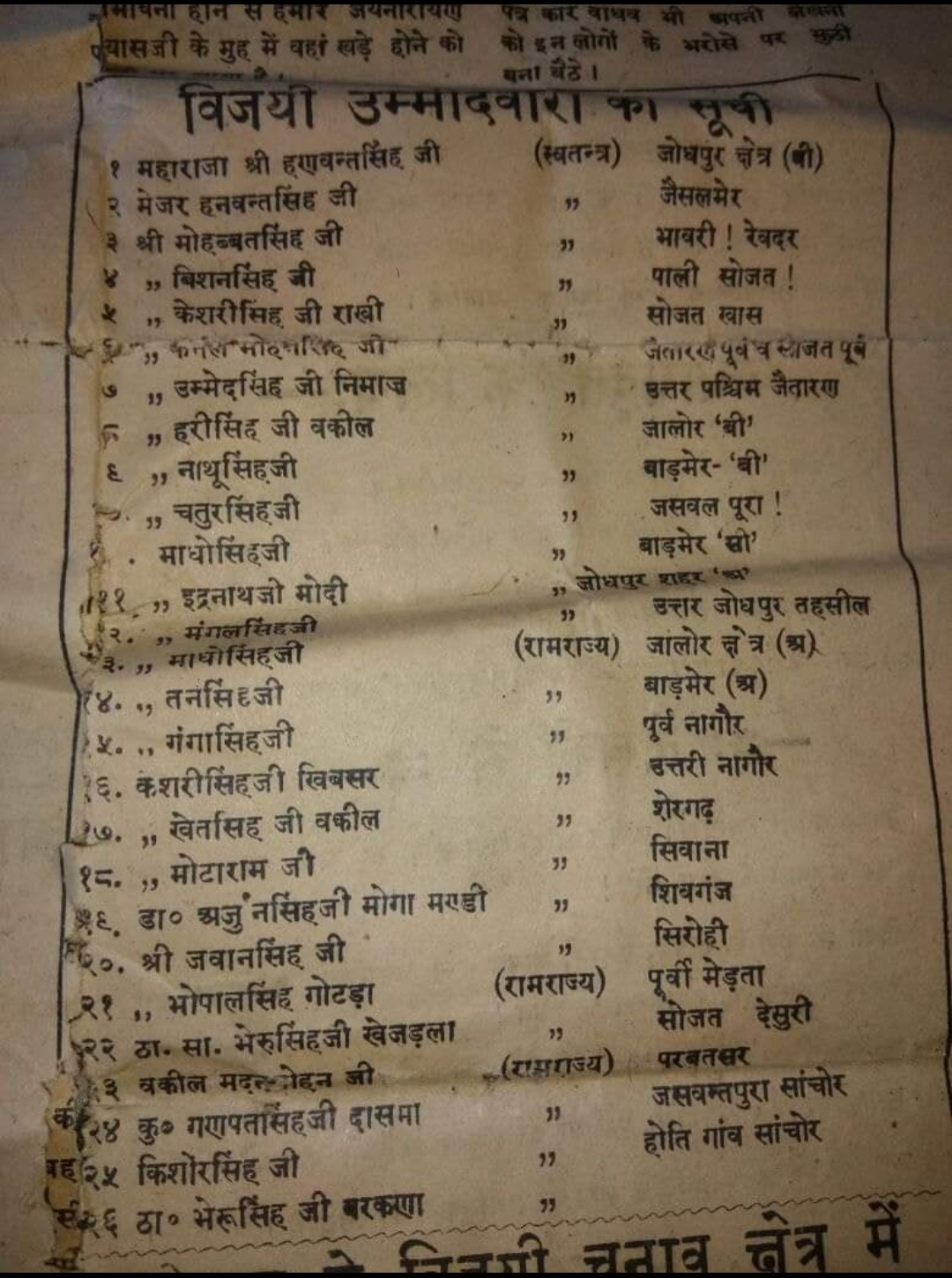
News Paper Cutting of winning Candidates of first MLA from Rajasthan Constituency in 1952
