= Sirohi Assembly constituency =

Legislative Assembly constituency in Rajasthan State, India

Coordinates: 24.89°N 72.86°E

Sirohi
- Constituency No. 146 for the Rajasthan Legislative Assembly

Constituency details
- Country: India
- Region: North India
- State: Rajasthan
- District: Sirohi
- Lok Sabha constituency: Jalore
- Established: 1951
- Total electors: 304,492
- Reservation: None

Member of Legislative Assembly
- 16th Rajasthan Legislative Assembly
- Incumbent Otaram Dewasi
- Party: Bharatiya Janata Party
- Elected year: 2023

Sirohi Assembly constituency is one of the 200 Legislative Assembly constituencies of Rajasthan state in India. It is in Sirohi district.

== Members of the Legislative Assembly ==
Year	Member	Party
1952	Jawan Singh	Independent
1957	Veerka	Independent
1957	Mohbat Singh	Indian National Congress
1962	Dharmaram	Indian National Congress
1967	M. Singh	Indian National Congress
1972	Shanti Lal Kothari	Indian National Congress
1977	Raghu Nandan Vyas	Janata Party
1980	Devisahai Gopalia	Indian National Congress
1985	Ramlal	Indian National Congress
1990	Tara Bhandari	Bharatiya Janata Party
1993	Tara Bhandari	Bharatiya Janata Party
1998	Sanyam Lodha	Indian National Congress
2003	Sanyam Lodha	Indian National Congress
2008	Otaram Dewasi	Bharatiya Janata Party
2013	Otaram Dewasi	Bharatiya Janata Party
2018	Sanyam Lodha	Indian National Congress
2023	Otaram Dewasi	Bharatiya Janata Party

== Election results ==
=== 2023 ===
2023 Rajasthan Legislative Assembly election: Sirohi
Party	Candidate	Votes	%	±%
BJP	Ota Ram Dewasi	114,729	56.64	+16.85
INC	Sanyam Lodha	78,924	38.96	+30.75
ASP(KR)	Motilal	2,298	1.13	
Independent	Hemant Purohit	2,269	1.12	
NOTA	None of the above	2,339	1.15	−0.32
Majority		35,805	17.68	+11.94
Turnout		202,572	66.53	+0.3
BJP gain from Independent		Swing		

=== 2018 ===
Rajasthan Legislative Assembly Election, 2018: Sirohi
Party	Candidate	Votes	%	±%
Independent	Sanyam Lodha	81,272	45.53	
BJP	Otaram Devasi	71,019	39.79	
INC	Jiva Ram Arya	14,656	8.21	
Independent	Tejraj Solanki	1,966	1.1	
HND	Deepa Rajguru	1,790	1.0	
NOTA	None of the above	2,621	1.47	
Majority		10,253	5.74	
Turnout		178,484	66.23	

== See also ==
- List of constituencies of the Rajasthan Legislative Assembly
- Sirohi district
