= State Highway 11 (Rajasthan) =

Road in Rajasthan, India

State Highway 11

Route information
- Length: 108 km (67 mi)

Major junctions
- East end: Sanchore, Rajasthan
- West end: Abu Road, Rajasthan

Location
- Country: India
- State: Rajasthan
- Districts: Jalore, Sirohi
- Primary destinations: Jaitpura, Raniwara, Reodar, Mandar

Highway system
- Roads in India; Expressways; National; State; Asian; State Highways in Rajasthan

State Highway 11 ( RJ SH 11) is a State Highway in Rajasthan state of India that connects Sanchore in Jalore district of Rajasthan with Abu Road in Sirohi district of Rajasthan. The total length of RJ SH 11 is 108 km.

This highway connects National Highway 15 in Sanchore to National Highway 14 in Abu Road. Other cities and towns on this highway are: Jaitpura, Raniwara, Reodar and Mandar.
