= Bhatana, Rajasthan =

Village in Rajasthan, India

Bhatana is a village in Reodar Tehsil, Sirohi district in the state Rajasthan. Population of the village is around 4976, Number of houses are around 960 as per the census 2011. It is around 35 kilometer away from Abu Road.
