= Dantrai =

Dantrai Dev Nagri Dantrai
- town
- Nickname: Harni Dantrai
- Location in Rajasthan, India Dantrai (India)
- Coordinates: 24.7166667°N 72.5166667°E
- Country: India
- State: Rajasthan
- District: Sirohi

Languages
  - Official: Hindi
- Time zone: UTC+5:30 (IST)
- PIN: 307512
- Telephone code: 02975
- ISO 3166 code: RJ-IN
- Vehicle registration: RJ-24
- Coastline: 0 kilometres (0 mi)
- Nearest Railway Station: Aburoad
- Lok Sabha constituency: Jalore - Sirohi

Dantrai, also known as Harni Dantrai, is a town in Reodar tehsil, Sirohi district, Rajasthan, India. The total geographical area of village is 2218 hectares.

Several castes of the Hindu religion live in this town such as KShartiya Ghanchi, Bhil, Rabari, Jain, Rajpurohit, Rajput, Rawal, Suthar, Rao, Prajapat, and Agarwal also live there. The town has various temples of the Jain and Hindu communities.

The village is administrated by a sarpanch who is elected representative of the village by the local elections.

Nine hundred families reside in the town. Dantrai village has a population of 4585 of which 2367 are males while 2218 are females as per population census 2011.

Dantrai has one post office, Chowki (police station), hospital, and powerhouse. The village is connected with Jalore - Reodar Highway.

Dantrai has two secondary schools (separate for boys & girls). The village is also equipped with recreational centers.

Dantrai belongs to Jodhpur Division. It is located 45 km towards west from District headquarters Sirohi, 14 km from Reodar, and 481 km from state capital Jaipur.

Dantrai's Pin code is 307512 and postal head office is Dantrai.

Many people from this town are successful businessmen, professionals such as Chartered Accountants, Doctors, and lawyer in various parts of the country. Most of the people in Dantrai depend on agriculture.

The town is surrounded by the Aravalli Range, which separates it from the Thar Desert. The most famous temples are Jageshwar Mahadev, Paadru Dham, and Bhakarli Mahadeo. Khimaj mata is also 5 kilometre away from village.

Abu Road is nearest town to Dantrai for all major economic activities and is approximately 48 km away.
