= Jagasi Ram Koli =

Indian politician

Jagasiram Jagmalram Koli

Member of the Rajasthan Legislative Assembly
- In office 2003–2023
- Preceded by: Chhoga Ram Bakoliya
- Succeeded by: Motiram Koli
- Constituency: Reodar

Personal details
- Born: 3 July 1967 (age 59) Ranadi village, Reodar, Sirohi district, Rajasthan
- Citizenship: India
- Party: Bhartiya Janata Party
- Spouse: Laxmi Devi
- Children: 1 son, 2 daughters
- Parent: Jagmal Ram Koli (father)
- Occupation: Agriculturist

Jagasiram Jagmalram Koli is an Indian Politician, Social Worker and incumbent four-time Member of the Rajasthan Legislative Assembly for Reodar constituency in Rajasthan, India. Jagasi Ram Koli belongs to the Bhartiya Janata Party. In 2018 general elections he beat Neeraj Dangi of Indian National Congress by a margin of 14604 votes.

== Other Minor posts ==
- Member of Committee on Welfare of Schedule Caste (2014-2015)
- Member of Committee on Welfare of Schedule Caste (2015-2016)
- Member of Committee on Welfare of Schedule Caste (2016-2017)
- Member of Committee on Welfare of Schedule Caste (2017-2018)
