= Vediya, Chitalwana =

Vediya Bedia and Veriya
- Village
- Location in Rajasthan, India
- Coordinates: 24.88°N 71.31°E
- Country: India
- State: Rajasthan
- District: Jalore
- Tehsil: Chitalwana

Area
  - Total: 1,070.45 ha (2,645.1 acres)

Population (2011)
  - Total: 1,611

Literacy rate
  - 34.14%: 34.14%
- Time zone: UTC+5:30 (IST)
- PIN: 343027
- Area code: 02979
- ISO 3166 code: RJ-IN
- Vehicle registration: RJ46
- Households: 272

Vediya or Veriya is a village and gram panchayat located in Chitalwana tehsil of the Jalore district. The old village panchayat for Vediya was Bheemgura.

== Administration ==
In November 2025, the Rural Development and Panchayati Raj Department of the Government of Rajasthan issued a gazette notification to reorganize and re-delimit 177 Gram Panchayats in Jalore district and to create 128 new ones. Under this notification, Vediya was notified as a newly created Gram Panchayat, one of the 28 new Gram Panchayats in the Chitalwana Panchayat Samiti.

== Demographics ==
The population of this village is 1611, out of which male population is 844 while female population is 767.

== Villages in Vediya Panchayat ==
- Vediya
- Janipura
- Bheensaron ki Dhani
