= India One Solar Thermal Power Plant =

Concentrated solar thermal power plant in Rajasthan, India

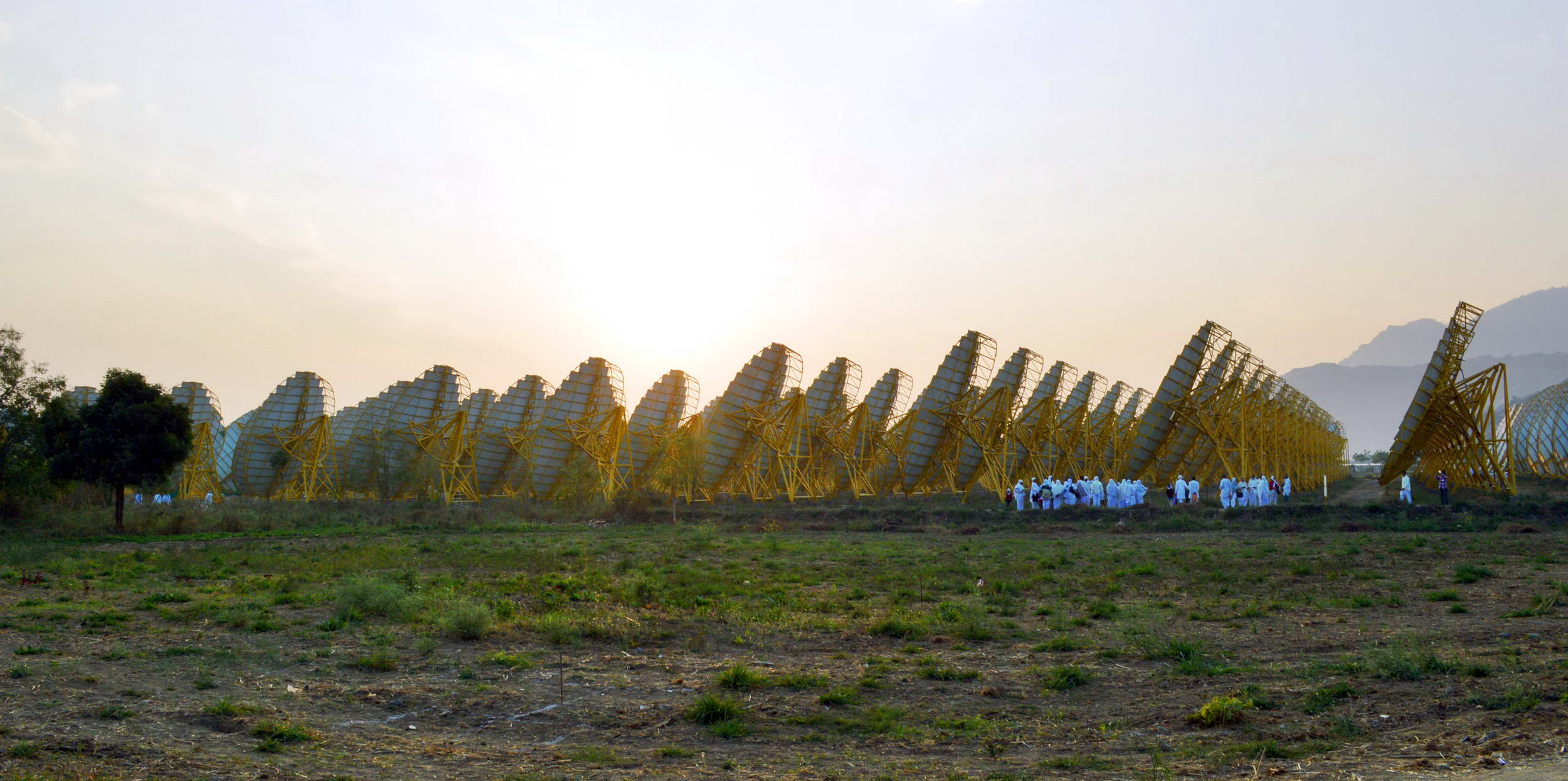
- India One Solar Thermal Power Plant, April 2014
- Country: India
- Location: Shantivan campus, Abu Road, Sirohi district, Rajasthan
- Status: Operational
- Construction began: 2010
- Commission date: 2017
- Construction cost: ₹80 crore (reported, 2025)
- Owner: Brahma Kumaris
- Operator: World Renewal Spiritual Trust

Solar farm
- Type: CSP
- Thermal capacity: 3.5 MW (thermal)

Power generation
- Units operational: 770 dishes of 60 m² each
- Nameplate capacity: 1 MW

India One Solar Thermal Power Plant is a 1 MW concentrated solar thermal power plant at the Shantivan campus of the Brahma Kumaris in Abu Road, Sirohi district, Rajasthan, India. It has 16 hours of thermal energy storage and supplies electricity and heat to the campus. The plant is operated by the World Renewal Spiritual Trust (WRST), a sister organisation of the Brahma Kumaris.

India One was developed as an Indo-German research and demonstration project. It received support from India's Ministry of New and Renewable Energy (MNRE) and Germany's Federal Ministry for the Environment, Nature Conservation, Building and Nuclear Safety (BMUB), through the ComSolar initiative of the Deutsche Gesellschaft für Internationale Zusammenarbeit (GIZ). Groundwork began in 2006, construction started in 2010, and the plant was commissioned in 2017.

The plant uses 770 parabolic dishes, each 60 m², to focus sunlight on cast-iron receivers. These receivers store heat and help the plant operate without photovoltaic cells or fossil fuel backup. At the time of commissioning, the plant supported a kitchen preparing about 35,000 meals a day and by 2025, the kitchen was preparing about 50,000 meals a day.

== Background ==
The Brahma Kumaris began experimenting with solar energy at their Mount Abu centres in the early 1990s. The work was linked to the large kitchens at the organisation's Mount Abu and Abu Road campuses. By the mid-1990s, the organisation was using a solar steam cooking system with twenty-four Scheffler reflectors, along with a solar hot-water system. The German federal government's International Climate Initiative (IKI) later described the Brahma Kumaris as a "pioneer in the solar movement in India".

The idea behind India One also drew on work by the Austrian physicist Wolfgang Scheffler, who introduced an early Scheffler-reflector system in India in 1990. The system was intended to help local communities cook without firewood.

== Development and funding ==
The groundwork for India One began in 2006. The project applied for Indian government clearance in 2009, and construction began in 2010. The total investment was estimated as about ₹80 crore.

The project was implemented by the World Renewal Spiritual Trust. It was partly funded by India's MNRE and Germany's BMUB through the GIZ-administered ComSolar programme. Golo Pilz, a German renewable-energy engineer and the Brahma Kumaris' Adviser on Renewable Energy, was Head of Project. Jayasimha Rathod was the project's chief executive officer. Everything from conception to fabrication, manufacturing and installation of the dishes, has been done in-house with the help of Yogi volunteers of Brahma Kumaris. Nearly 90 per cent of the plant's components had been designed and made in India.

== Design and technology ==
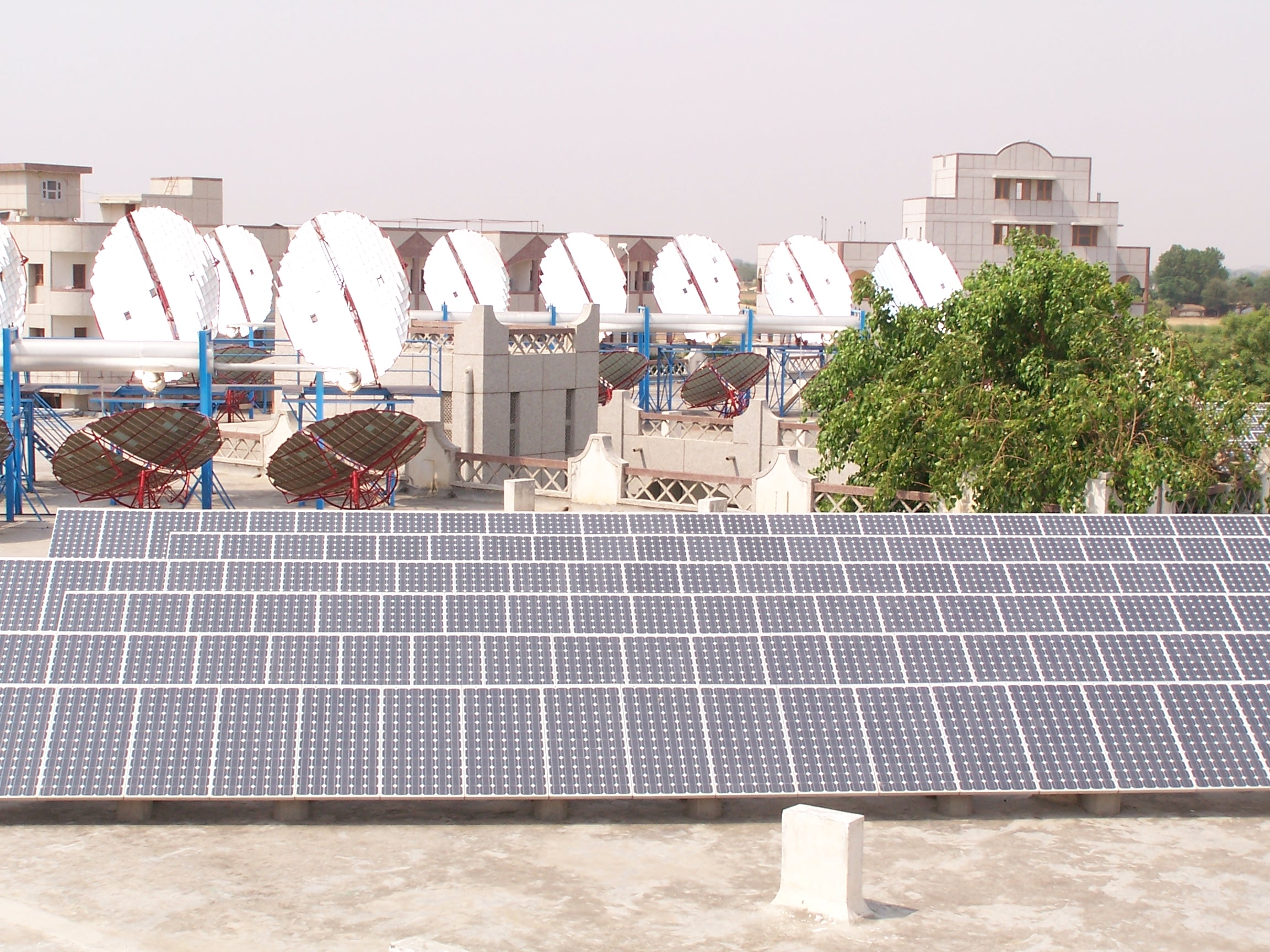
A large solar generator at India One Solar Thermal Power Plant

India One has an electrical capacity of 1 MW and a thermal capacity of about 3.5 MW. Its thermal storage is designed to provide 16 hours of operation without photovoltaic cells or fossil-fuel backup.

The collector field has 770 parabolic dishes, each 60 m². The dishes track the sun and focus sunlight onto fixed cast-iron receivers. Each receiver is made from about three tonnes of cast iron and works both as the absorber and as the heat-storage block. The system produces super-heated steam directly in the receivers, at reported conditions of about 450 °C and 42 bar. It does not use thermal oil, molten salt, or intermediate heat exchangers. The storage temperature ranges from about 250 °C to 450 °C during operation.

== Operation ==
The plant covered about 25 acres (10 ha) when it was commissioned and expanded to 35 acres by 2025. It works as a captive, off-grid power station for the Shantivan campus. The campus has capacity for about 25,000 people, and the plant also supplies off-grid electricity to about 10,000 people in the surrounding community.

At commissioning, the plant produced enough heat and electricity to prepare about 35,000 meals a day. The daily output of the plant was about 16,000 kWh of electricity and about half of that output was used on the Brahma Kumaris campus, and the kitchen was preparing about 50,000 meals a day "without electricity, firewood or cooking gas".

== Recognition ==
On 29 April 2016, the Brahma Kumaris and the World Renewal Spiritual Trust received the CST and Solar Cooker Excellence Award 2016 in New Delhi. The award was presented at a national workshop convened by the Ministry of New and Renewable Energy with the Global Environment Facility–UNDP programme on concentrating solar thermal energy. Minister of State Piyush Goyal presented the award. The IKI announcement includes a photograph of Goyal handing the award to Golo Pilz as Head of Project of India One.

== See also ==
- Brahma Kumaris
- Concentrated solar power
- Solar power in India
- List of solar thermal power stations
- Renewable energy in India
- Wolfgang Scheffler
