= Chimrawas =

- town
- Nickname: jambheshwar nagar
- Location in Rajasthan, India Chimrawas (India)
- Coordinates: 24.936°N 71.488°E
- Country: India
- State: Rajasthan
- District: Jalore

Population
  - Total: 5,029

Languages
  - Official: Hindi Marwari
- Time zone: UTC+5:30 (IST)
- PIN: 343041
- ISO 3166 code: RJ-IN

Chimrawas is a village located in Tehsil Chitalwana in the Jalore district of Rajasthan, India. Chimrawas is located 33 km (21 mi) distance from Sanchore main town. It is 300 km (190 mi) from Jodhpur city. Near by village of this village with distance are Dungari (6 km or 3.7 mi), Keriya (15 km or 9.3 mi), National Highway 15(25). The majority of the population are Bishnoi. The main business of the villagers are milk production and agriculture.

== Politics ==
Current Surpanch: Ashok Kumar khod

MLA: Sukhram Bishnoi

MP: Devji M Patel

Current President: Chhoga Ram Bishnoi

== Education ==
Education institutes in the village:

- Govt. School secondary
- Sarswati Vidya Mandir (Upper Primary)

Educational Institutes near the village:

- Indira College Lalji Ki Dungari (6km)
- College Sanchore (33km)
- Senior Secondary School, Dungari(6km)
- Senior Secondary School, Sesawa(6km)

== Crops ==
- Bajra (Pennisetum glaucum) - The main food of the village, most widely grown type of millet.
- Jeera (Cuminum cyminum)
