= Hadecha =

- village
- Location in Rajasthan, India Hadecha (India)
- Coordinates: 24°48′52″N 71°39′35″E
- Country: India
- State: Rajasthan
- District: Jalore

Population (2011)
  - Total: 3,952

Languages
  - Official: Hindi
- Time zone: UTC+5:30 (IST)
- Nearest city: Sanchore
- Lok Sabha constituency: Jalore
- Vidhan Sabha constituency: Sanchore

Hadecha is a village in Chitalwana Tehsil in the Jalore district of Indian state of Rajasthan. Hadecha is about 15 km (9.3 mi) from Sanchore and is an important town in the city. According to a 2011 census, the population of Hadecha was 3952.
