= Sildar =

Village in Rajasthan, India

Coordinates: 24°48′N 72°31′E

Sildar is a small village located in Sirohi district, in the state of Rajasthan in Western India. It had majority of Jain residents who shifted to cities like Pune, Mumbai, Chennai and even Andaman in search of new business opportunities.
