= Chadual =

- village
- Location in Rajasthan, India Chadual (India)
- Coordinates: 24°54′43″N 72°38′49″E
- Country: India
- State: Rajasthan
- District: Sirohi

Government
  - Body: Gram Panchayat

Languages
  - Official: Hindi Marwari
- Time zone: UTC+5:30 (IST)
- Postal code: 307802
- ISO 3166 code: RJ-IN
- Vehicle registration: RJ-24
- Coastline: 0 kilometres (0 mi)

Chadual is a village in Sirohi district in the Indian state of Rajasthan

== Geography ==
It is located about 25 km west of Sirohi.

== Demographics ==
This village has many castes including Purohit, Rawal Brahmin, Rajput, Jain, Suthar, Mali, Prajapat, Bhatt Brahmin, Dewasi, Boda Prajapat, Meghwal and Bheel.

== Governance ==
This village is represented by the Govt. Local Body Gram Panchayat tanwari.

== Culture ==
This village has many Hindu temples and also one Jain temple.

== Gallery ==
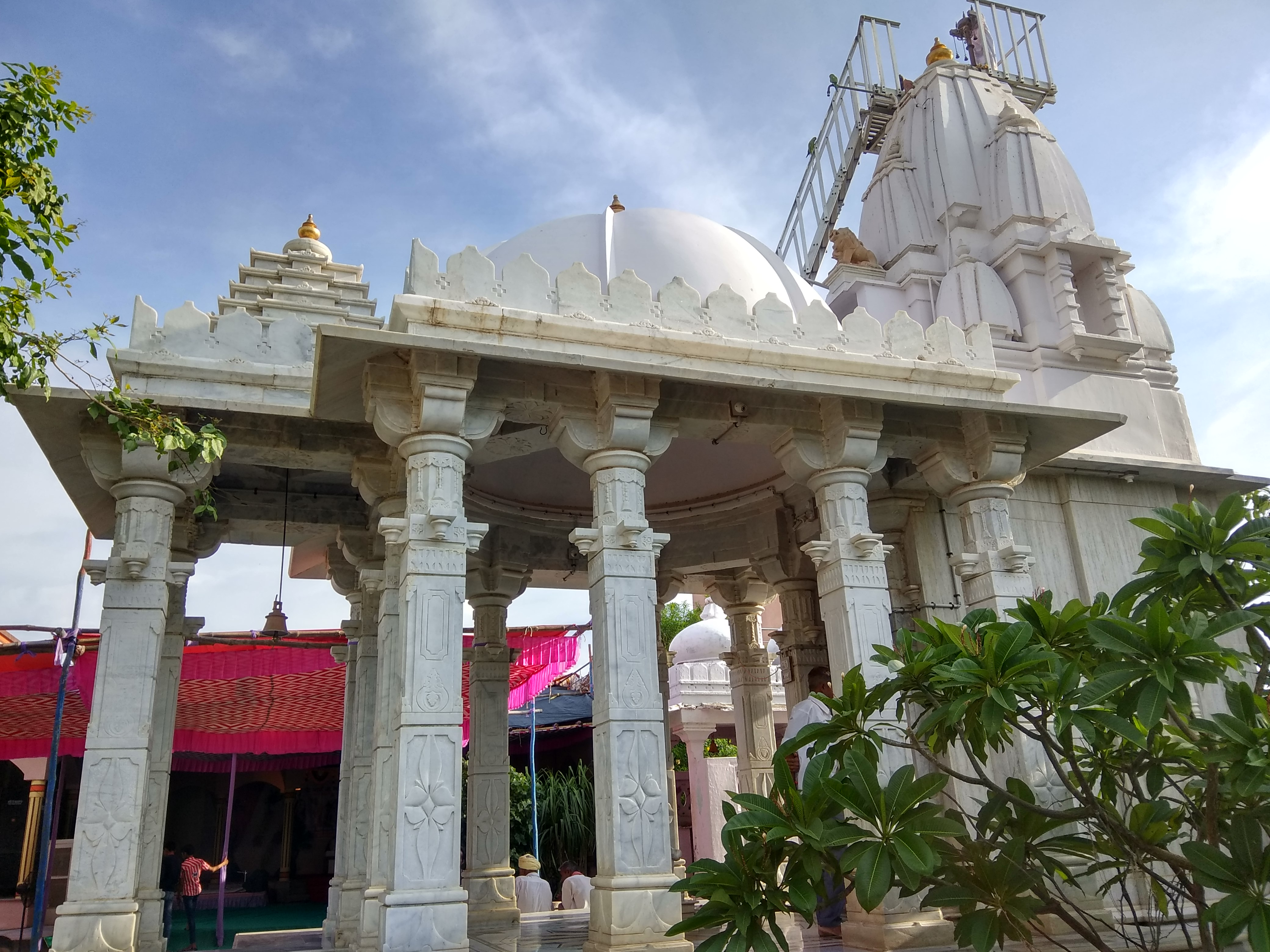
Shri Vaijnath Mahadev Temple in Chadual

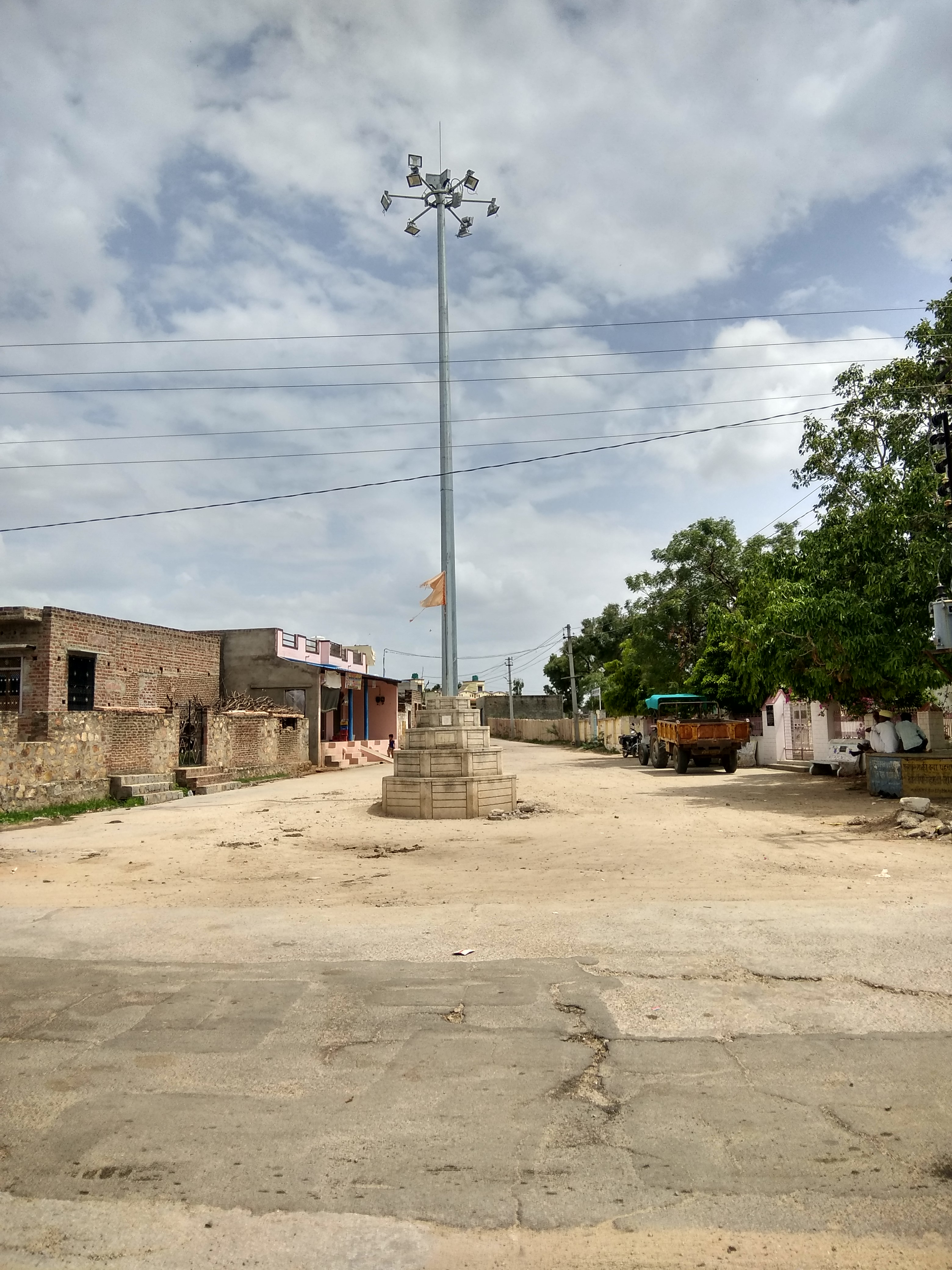
Chadual Bus Station
