= Warada =

Varada Varada
- Village
- Location in Rajasthan, India Varada (India)
- Coordinates: 25.0330695°N 72.6861587°E
- Country: India
- State: Rajasthan
- District: Sirohi
- Talukas: Sirohi

Government
  - Body: Gram Panchayat
- Elevation: 231 m (758 ft)

Population (2001)
  - Total: 9,040

Languages
  - Official: Hindi, Marwari
- Time zone: UTC+5:30 (IST)
- PIN: 307801
- ISO 3166 code: RJ-IN
- Vehicle registration: RJ-24
- Lok Sabha constituency: Jalore (Lok Sabha Constituency)
- Vidhan Sabha constituency: Sirohi
- Civic agency: Gram Panchayat

Varada is a village situated in Sirohi tehsil of Sirohi District of Rajasthan in Western India. It lies on Sirohi - Jalore Highway, 27 km north of Sirohi and 48 km south of Jalore. Only in Varada village you can find the famous "PILOO" tree. It is the only village having PILOO tree in entire Rajasthan.

== Demographics ==
Population of Varada is 2,744 according to census 2011. where male population is 1,405 while female population is 1,339.
