= Bheemgura =

Village in Rajasthan, India

Bheemguda
- Gram Panchayat
- Bheemgura
- Country: India
- State: Rajasthan
- District: Jalore
- Tehsil: Chitalwana

Government
  - Sarpanch: Parwati Devi

Area
  - Total: 437.94 ha (1,082.2 acres)

Population (2011)
  - Total: 927
- Time zone: UTC+5:30 (IST)
- PIN: 343027
- ISO 3166 code: RJ-IN
- Vehicle registration: RJ-46

Bheemgura or Bheemguda is a village and gram panchayat in the Jalore district in Rajasthan, India. Bheemgura has a total population of 927 peoples according to Census 2011. Bheemgura 53km away from district headquarter Sanchore.

Along with this, Narmada Canal Distributor and Post Office are also located here.
