= Korka =

- village
- Interactive map of Korka
- Coordinates: 25.1584°N 72.2444°E
- Country: India
- State: Rajasthan
- District: Jalore district

Population (2011)
  - Total: 2,953

Languages
  - Official: Hindi
- Time zone: UTC+5:30 (IST)
- PIN: 343040
- Vehicle registration: RJ- 40
- Nearest city: Bhinmal
- Lok Sabha constituency: Jalore
- Vidhan Sabha constituency: Raniwara

Korka or Kodka is a village in the Tehsil of Raniwara, Jalore District, Rajasthan State, India. It belongs to Jodhpur division. It is located 66 KM south of the district headquarters in Jalore and 486 KM from the state capital Jaipur.

== Demographics ==
Total 525 families residing in Korka. Korka village has the population of 2,953 of which 1537 are males while 1416 are females as per Population Census 2011. In Korka village population of children with age 0-6 is 540 which makes up 18.29% of total population of the village. Average Sex Ratio of Korka village is 921 which is lower than Rajasthan state average of 928. Child Sex Ratio for the Korka as per census is 957, higher than Rajasthan average of 888. Korka village has lower literacy rate compared to Rajasthan. In 2011, the literacy rate of Korka village was 55.04% compared to 66.11% of Rajasthan. In Korka Male literacy stands at 71.69% while female literacy rate was 36.81%. Korka has been a multi-ethnic and multi-religious town. The Hindus forms a largest religious group, followed by Muslims. As per constitution of India and Panchayati Raj Act, Korka village is administrated by Sarpanch (Head of Village) who is elected representative of the village.

== Transportation ==
Rajasthan State Road Transport Corporation(RSRTC) runs regular services to many destinations in the state. The village has one bus stand.

== Economy ==
=== Agriculture ===
Korka is known for its Agriculture work. Thousands of people are farmer in Korka. Dairy Farm is most work of Korka. All farmer of Korka are keep animal as Cow, Baffalo, Goat, Sheep, Camel and others animals. There are four dairy farm in Korka. There are small many shops in Korka, as Nagneshi General Store, Swami Narayan General Store, Rajeshwar mobile and others.

=== Temples ===
- Baba Ramdev temple
- Shiv Temple
- Gogaji Temple
- Momaji Temple
- Ramtaramji Temple
- Swami Narayan Temple

== Telecommunications ==
Telephone services are provided by various players like Airtel, Idea cellular, Vodafone, Reliance Infocomm, Tata Docomo, MTS, Uninor, Tata Indicom and the state owned BSNL and most of them provide 3G services also.

Currently, Airtel, Vodafone and Idea provide 4G LTE services in the Village. Reliance Jio has also started the services.

== Education ==
There are 7 schools in Korka, including:

- Govt.Se.Sec. School
- Ramdev Public School (Late. Vija Ramji)
- Adarsh Vidhya Mandir Sec. School (Ramjiram Chaudhary)
- Sarswati Public School (Jwahara Ram)
