= Kusuma, Rajasthan =

Coordinates: 24°00′N 87°48′E

Kusuma Magariwara Gram Panchayat
- village
- Interactive map of Kusuma
- Country: India
- State: Rajasthan

Languages
  - Official: Hindi
- Time zone: UTC+5:30 (IST)
- ISO 3166 code: RJ-IN

Kusuma is a village attached to 'Magariwara' in Reodar Tahsil of Sirohi District of Indian state of Rajasthan. It is 45 km from Abu Road. Its ancient name was Kutsasrama meaning a hermitage of Kutsa. In the seventh century it was famous for the temple of Shiva, built in neighbourhood of Kusuma by a warrior named Satyabhata. In 625 AD this area was held by Rajilla who was a feudatory of King Varmalata of Bhinmal.
