= Badgaon, Jalore =

Badgaon
- Village
- Bargaon
- Country: India
- State: Rajasthan
- District: Jalore
- Tehsil: Raniwara

Area
  - Total: 2,009.72 ha (4,966.1 acres)

Population (2011)
  - Total: 6,453
- Time zone: UTC+5:30 (IST)
- PIN: 343029
- ISO 3166 code: RJ-IN

Badgaon is a village in Raniwara tehsil, in the Jalore district of Rajasthan. It is 10 km (6.2 mi) from Raniwara in the northwest and 17 km (11 mi) from Mandar in the southeast. There is a gram panchayat headquarters within it. Badgaon has a dominant Jain community and a Jain temple as well as many people of the Dawoodi Bohra community. Bargaon has a total population of 6,453 peoples according to Census 2011.

Although the old area of the village around the well is quite abandoned, the area near bus stand is fast developing.

Badgaon was called "Jalore ka Kashmir" before Deora rajputs are prominent in this area. Nearby Badgaon are many villages, including Rupawati Kalan, Rupawati khurd, Dhamseen, Vagtapura, Jetpura and Rampura.

There are many schools, including Govt. Senior Secondary School, Shatabdi Children Senior School, Badgaon Shatabdi Children Senior Secondary School, Vidhya Bharti School, Gurukul, Happy Home and Tagore Public.

Badgaon is on the border of Sirohi district.
