= Wolfgang Scheffler (inventor) =

Austrian inventor

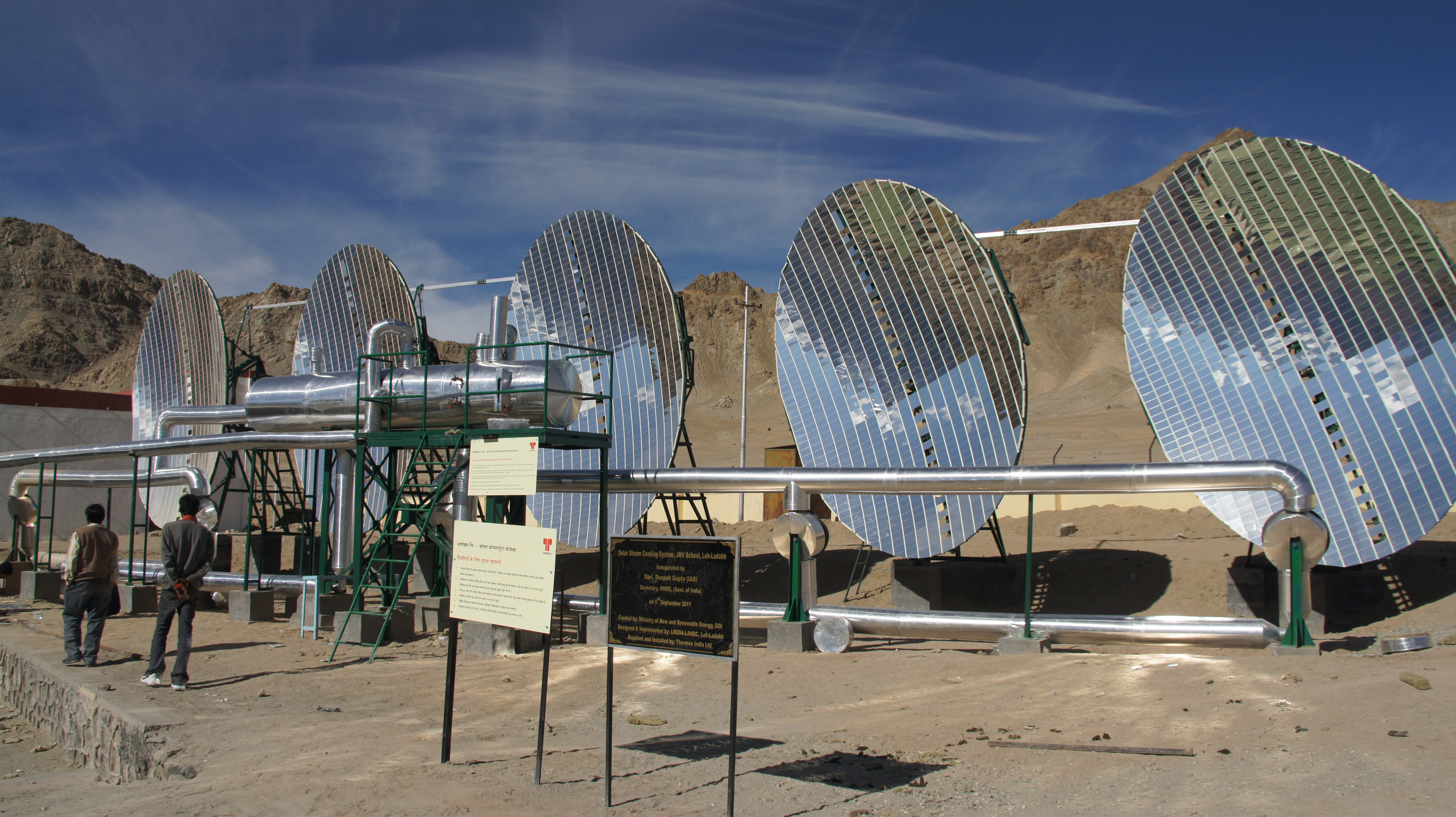
Scheffler cooker at JNV school in Leh, India.

Wolfgang Scheffler (born 1956) is an Austrian inventor. He invented and promoted Scheffler reflectors, large, flexible parabolic reflecting dishes that concentrate sunlight for solar cooking in community kitchens, bakeries, and in the world's first solar-powered crematorium. By early 2008, over 2000 large cookers of his design had been built distributed worldwide including the world's largest solar cooker.

Scheffler was born in Innsbruck, Austria.

In 1983 he finished his master's degree in physics at the University of Cologne. With a friend he wanted to construct a mirror to use solar energy to make glass in developing countries. The friend changed but Scheffler has developed the principle of this deformable mirror.

In the press there was talk of the scarce firewood in developing countries. So in 1983 he had the idea of using the mirror for cooking. To get to know an African country for the first time, he worked for six weeks in an aid camp in Kenya. At the end he talked to the director about the solar stove. He was invited to come back and start the project on site. In 1985, they started, initially with simple solar cooking boxes made of cardboard, foil and glass. They used them to make tea, to convince people that this works. This was done with an emphasis on local construction of the devices.

Contacts to India were established through development aid. In India, his idea really took off, including collaboration with the Brahma Kumaris on large solar steam cooking kitchens using Scheffler reflectors at their Mount Abu and Abu Road campuses from the 1990s onwards. Later India One 1 MW solar thermal station at Abu Road, commissioned in 2017, grew out of Scheffler's introduction of the reflector technology in India in 1990. The NGO Solare Bruecke was founded in 1992.

In 2001 he learned from a radio interview with the German Prof. Peter Dienel about the actual existence of a superbly effective participatory decision-making process, which Dienel had developed in 1973 (Planungszelle, Citizens' assembly). Scheffler started promoting his method.

Together with Heike Hoedt he received the Special Recognition Award at the 2006 Nuclear-Free Future Award.

== See also ==
- India One Solar Thermal Power Plant
- Solar cooker
