= Reodar Assembly constituency =

Legislative Assembly constituency in Rajasthan State, India

Coordinates: 24.62°N 72.53°E

Reodar
- Constituency No. 148 for the Rajasthan Legislative Assembly

Constituency details
- Country: India
- Region: North India
- State: Rajasthan
- District: Sirohi
- Lok Sabha constituency: Jalore
- Established: 1977
- Total electors: 283,584
- Reservation: SC

Member of Legislative Assembly
- 16th Rajasthan Legislative Assembly
- Incumbent Motiram Koli
- Party: Indian National Congress
- Elected year: 2023

Reodar or Reodar-Abu Road Assembly constituency is one of the 200 Legislative Assembly constituencies of Rajasthan state in India.

It is part of Sirohi district, and is reserved for candidates belonging to the Scheduled Castes. As of 2023, it is represented by Motiram Koli of the Indian National Congress.

== Members of the Legislative Assembly ==
Year	Member	Party
2003	Jagasi Ram Koli	Bharatiya Janata Party
2008	Jagasi Ram Koli	Bharatiya Janata Party
2013	Jagasi Ram Koli	Bharatiya Janata Party
2018	Jagasi Ram Koli	Bharatiya Janata Party
2023	Motiram Koli	Indian National Congress

== Election results ==
=== 2023 ===
2023 Rajasthan Legislative Assembly election: Reodar
Party	Candidate	Votes	%	±%
INC	Motiram Koli	93,120	46.94	+5.51
BJP	Jagsi Ram Koli	89,556	45.14	−4.55
BSP	Veena Ram	3,797	1.91	+0.56
Independent	Gopal Dana	3,179	1.6	
BAP	Ganpat Lal	2,319	1.17	
NOTA	None of the above	5,178	2.61	−0.84
Majority		3,564	1.8	−6.46
Turnout		198,385	69.96	−1.2
INC gain from BJP		Swing		

=== 2018 ===
Rajasthan Legislative Assembly Election, 2018: Reodar
Party	Candidate	Votes	%	±%
BJP	Jagsi Ram Koli	87,861	49.69	
INC	Neeraj Dangi	73,257	41.43	
Independent	Narayan Lal	3,328	1.88	
BSP	Radheshyam	2,395	1.35	
AAP	Sukhraj	1,817	1.03	
NOTA	None of the above	6,108	3.45	
Majority		14,604	8.26	
Turnout		176,820	71.16	

== See also ==
- List of constituencies of the Rajasthan Legislative Assembly
- Sirohi district
