= Motiram Koli =

Indian politician

Member of Rajasthan Legislative Assembly
- Incumbent
- Assumed office 3 December 2023
- Governor: Kalraj Mishra; Haribhau Bagade
- Chief Minister: Bhajan Lal Sharma
- Preceded by: Jagasi Ram Koli
- Constituency: Reodar

Personal details
- Born: Motiram Punamramji Koli; 1971 (age 54–55) Reodar, Sirohi district, Rajasthan
- Party: Indian National Congress
- Occupation: Politician
- Profession: Agriculturist
- Nickname: Pradhanji

Motiram Punamramji Koli is an Indian politician, social worker and current Member of the Rajasthan Legislative Assembly from Reodar Assembly constituency as a member of Indian National Congress party. Motiram Koli defeated the Jagasi Ram Koli of Bharatiya Janata Party by the margin of 3,564 votes in 2023 Rajasthan Legislative Assembly election.

== Political career ==
- 2008, Pradhan of Reodar Panchayat samiti
- 2023, Member of 2023 Rajasthan Legislative Assembly election
