= Arnay =

Village in Rajasthan, India

- Village
- Country: India
- State: Rajasthan
- District: Jalore
- Tehsil: Sanchore

Area
  - Total: 3,156.06 ha (7,798.8 acres)

Population (2011)
  - Total: 6,312
- Time zone: UTC+5:30 (IST)
- PIN: 343041
- ISO 3166 code: RJ-IN
- Vehicle registration: RJ-46

Arnay is a village in the Jalore district, Rajasthan, India. Arnay is situated 18 km (11 mi) from tehsil headquarters. Agriculture is the main occupation of this village. The population of this village is 6,312 according to Census 2011. This village has an average literacy rate of 52%; male literacy is 65% and female literacy is 38%.

== Distances ==
National Highway 68 of India passes 15 km (9.3 mi) from this village. The nearest railway station is Bhinmal, which is 40 km (25 mi) away. Block headquarters are connected by bus service.
