= Golasan =

Village in Rajasthan, India

- Village
- Country: India
- State: Rajasthan
- District: Jalore

Area
  - Total: 2,100.42 ha (5,190.3 acres)

Population (2011)
  - Total: 3,949
- Time zone: UTC+5:30 (IST)
- PIN: 343041
- ISO 3166 code: RJ-IN
- Vehicle registration: RJ-46

Golasan is a village in the Jalore district in Rajasthan, India. Golasan has a total population of 3,949 people according to Census 2011. Hotigaon 13 km (8.1 mi) away from district headquarter Sanchore. Golasan Balaji Temple is famous for a fair that is held here every year. The south-facing self-manifested Hanuman idol here is uniquely miraculous.
