= Sadalwa =

Village in Rajasthan, India

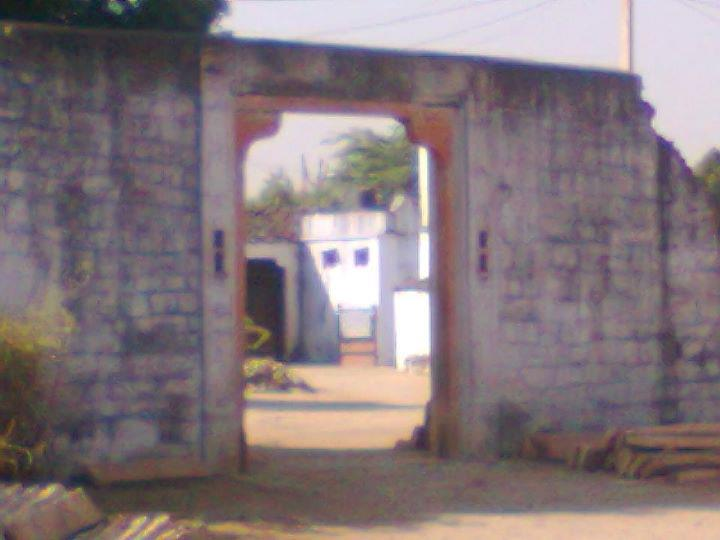
Sadalwa Gate

Sadalwa is a village in Rajasthan, India. It is located in the Pindwara tehsil of the Sirohi district in Rajasthan. Lakhavat deora

== Geography ==
Sadalwa is populated by about 63 families, belonging to the Deora clan. It is 10 kilometers (6.2 miles) from Pindwara city. The nearest railway stations are Keshavganj, Sirohi Road and Aouarh.

== About ==
A statue of The Great Ancestor is located at the village entrance in front of the temple. The statue was also known as Dadosa or data (grandfather) in the Rajput community. One of the Ancestors (dadosa or grandfather) apparently killed a pandit or priest, who was riding on a horse in front of the Sadalwa gate, with a "talwar" (sword), because in Rajput culture it is considered that no person other than Rajput can move in front of the Rajput houses.
