= Mandwariya =

Village in Rajasthan, India

Mandwariya a village and Panchayat area in the Sirohi district of Rajasthan, India.
