= Pindwara =

Pindwara Pindarvataka
- Town
- Location in Rajasthan, India Pindwara (Rajasthan)
- Coordinates: 24.7945°N 73.055°E
- Country: India
- State: Rajasthan
- District: Sirohi
- Nearest city: Sirohi City
- Settled: 1433 AD
- Named for: Home of God

Government
  - Type: Rajasthan Government
  - Body: Municipality
  - Chairman: Rakesh Rawal BJP
  - Vice Chairman: Chelaram Dewasi BJP

Area
  - Total: 20 km^{2} (7.7 sq mi)
  - Rank: 3rd In Sirohi District
- Elevation: 372 m (1,220 ft)

Population (2011)
  - Total: 24,487
  - Rank: 4th In Sirohi District
  - Density: 1,200/km^{2} (3,200/sq mi)

Languages
  - Official: Hindi
- Time zone: UTC+5:30 (IST)
- PIN: 307022
- Telephone code: 02971
- ISO 3166 code: RJ-IN
- Vehicle registration: RJ-24 RJ-38
- Sex ratio: 1000/908 ♂/♀
- Literacy Rate: 75.98%(2011)
- Nearest City: Sirohi, Udaipur, Abu Road, Palanpur, Falna
- Avg. summer temperature: 37 °C (99 °F)
- Avg. winter temperature: 5 °C (41 °F)
- Avg. Rainfall: 600-800MM
- Website: urban.rajasthan.gov.in/content/raj/udh/nagar-palika-pindwara/en/home.html.html

Pindwara is a municipality and tehsil located nearby Sirohi city in Sirohi District in the Indian state of Rajasthan. Pindwara is one of main financial city of Sirohi district after Abu Road. As of 2011, the population of Pindwara is 24,487. It is located 435 km (270 mi) southwest of the state capital, Jaipur, between Aravalli Hills and plains of Marwar region. The city used to be a major area of marble and stone carving in India for a long time. It is common belief that if there is any construction of temple work all over the world, it could not complete without involvement of Pindwara artisan. This is proved by this fact that marble carvings of major temples of India like Akshardham temple network, Shri Ram temple Ayodhya are being carried out in the city.

The nearest airports are in Udaipur (100 km [62 mi]) and Ahmedabad (230 km [140 mi]). It is connected by RSRTC and GSRTC operated buses to all parts of Rajasthan, and Indian cities of Ahmedabad, New Delhi And Mumbai. It also has railway connectivity with Chennai, Bangalore, Puri, Hyderabad, Mysuru, Agra, Haridwar, Gwalior, Kolkata, Mumbai, etc.

== Geography ==
Pindwara is at 24.7945°N 73.055°E. It has an average elevation of 372 metres (1,220 ft). The city is situated in the lap of the Aravallis and is known for the high mountain ranges of the Aravallis. It is about 100 km (62 mi) from Udaipur and 240 km (150 mi) from Ahmedabad.

== History ==
The history of this city is studied from the history of Sirohi. The region falls in the Sirohi kingdom and was ruled in the 14th century by Rao Devraj who belongs to the "Chouhan clan" of the Rajputana clan.

== 2026 ULB election ==
The 2026 ULB election for the Pindwara Municipality was held on 11 September 2026. Vote counting was conducted on 14 September 2026. The results were as follows:

Party	Wards won
INC	13
BJP	7
Independent	5
Total	25

=== Ward-wise results ===
Ward No.	Elected member	Party
1	Dinesh Gurjar	INC
2	Tarun Meena	INC
3	Gudiya Meena	INC
4	Azharuddin Meman	INC
5	Rinku Devi	BJP
6	Vijay Kumar	Independent
7	Ramesh Prajapat	INC
8	Parbat Singh	INC
9	Basu Devi	Independent
10	Tina Devi	BJP
11	Badi Devi	BJP
12	Ranchhod Rawal	Independent
13	Chetan Agrawal	BJP
14	Prakash Kunwar	INC
15	Ashok Prajapat	Independent
16	Prateek Tak	BJP
17	Vinesh Bhati	INC
18	Sushila Devi	INC
19	Rakesh Rawal	INC
20	Sanjay Garg	INC
21	Chelaram Dewasi	BJP
22	Parwati Garg	Independent
23	Radha Devi	INC
24	Ranchhod Gavariya	BJP
25	Achal Singh Baliya	INC

== Demographics ==
According to the 2011 Census of India, Pindwara had a population of 24,487. Males constituted 52.40% of the population and females 47.60%. Pindwara had an average literacy rate of 75.98%, higher than the state average of 66.11%. 88.86% of the males and 61.84% of females were literate. 13.93% of the population is under 6 years of age. Pindwara was the most populous tehsil in Sirohi district with a population of 2,61,789 and controlling over 107 villages. The religious population of Pindwara was 88.56% Hindu, 7.55% Muslim, 0.08% Sikhs, 3.68% Jain, 0.05% Christians, and 0.03% did not answer.

Religions in Pindwara
Hinduism	88.56%
Islam	7.55%
jainism	3.68%
sikh	0.08%
others	0.05%
Distribution of Religions; Includes Christians (0.05%).

=== Population growth through the years ===
Population growth through the years
Year	Population
1991	15,185
2001	20,765
2011	24,487

== Climate ==
Pindwara is influenced by the local steppe climate. The warmest month of the year is May, with an average temperature of 32.7 °C (90.9 °F). The lowest average temperatures in the year occur in January, when it is around 17.5 °C (63.5 °F). The average annual temperature in Pindwara is 25.5 °C (77.9 °F).

Climate data for Pindwara
Month	Jan	Feb	Mar	Apr	May	Jun	Jul	Aug	Sep	Oct	Nov	Dec	Year
Mean daily maximum °C (°F)	25.5 (77.9)	25.9 (78.6)	36.4 (97.5)	40.8 (105.4)	41.1 (106.0)	44.2 (111.6)	35.0 (95.0)	32.4 (90.3)	32.9 (91.2)	31.2 (88.2)	30.3 (86.5)	28.7 (83.7)	33.7 (92.7)
Mean daily minimum °C (°F)	15.1 (59.2)	10.0 (50.0)	20.2 (68.4)	24.8 (76.6)	26.2 (79.2)	28.3 (82.9)	25.2 (77.4)	23.2 (73.8)	24.6 (76.3)	20.1 (68.2)	15.9 (60.6)	12.3 (54.1)	20.5 (68.9)
Average precipitation mm (inches)	3 (0.1)	0 (0)	1 (0.0)	1 (0.0)	5 (0.2)	56 (2.2)	513 (20.2)	633 (24.9)	307 (12.1)	29 (1.1)	9 (0.4)	1 (0.0)	1,558 (61.2)
