= Mungathala =

- village
- Mungathala Jain temple in 1897
- Country: India
- State: Rajasthan
- Tehsil: Abu Road

Languages
  - Official: Hindi
- Time zone: UTC+5:30 (IST)
- ISO 3166 code: RJ-IN

Mungathala is an old village in Sirohi district of in Indian state of Rajasthan. It lies about 10 km north to Abu Road. Its old name is Mungasthala. The Saiva temple of Mogadesvara and a Śvetāmbara Jain temple of Mahavira are celebrated temples of the place.

Mundasthala is one of the Towns and Villages of Balecha (Baliya) Chauhan Dominions.

This name occurs in number of epigraphs of 12th century as Mundasthala. This proves its antiquity. This is a sacred Śvetāmbara Jain pilgrimage dedicated to the 24th Tirthankara Mahavira. In an inscription dating back to the14th century, it is called Mahatirtha.
