= Chandravati =

- village
- Location in Rajasthan, India Chandravati (India)
- Coordinates: 24°27′00″N 72°46′00″E
- Country: India
- State: Rajasthan
- Tehsil: Abu Road

Languages
  - Official: Hindi
- Time zone: UTC+5:30 (IST)
- Vehicle registration: RJ-38

Chandravati, popularly known as Chandroti, is a village situated near Abu Road on the bank of the West Banas River in the Indian state of Rajasthan. In ancient times it was an extensive town, and present villages such as Dattani, Kiverli, Kharadi and Santpura were its suburbs. The old ruins, such as temples, torans and images scattered over the large area, bear testimony to its past glory.

== History ==
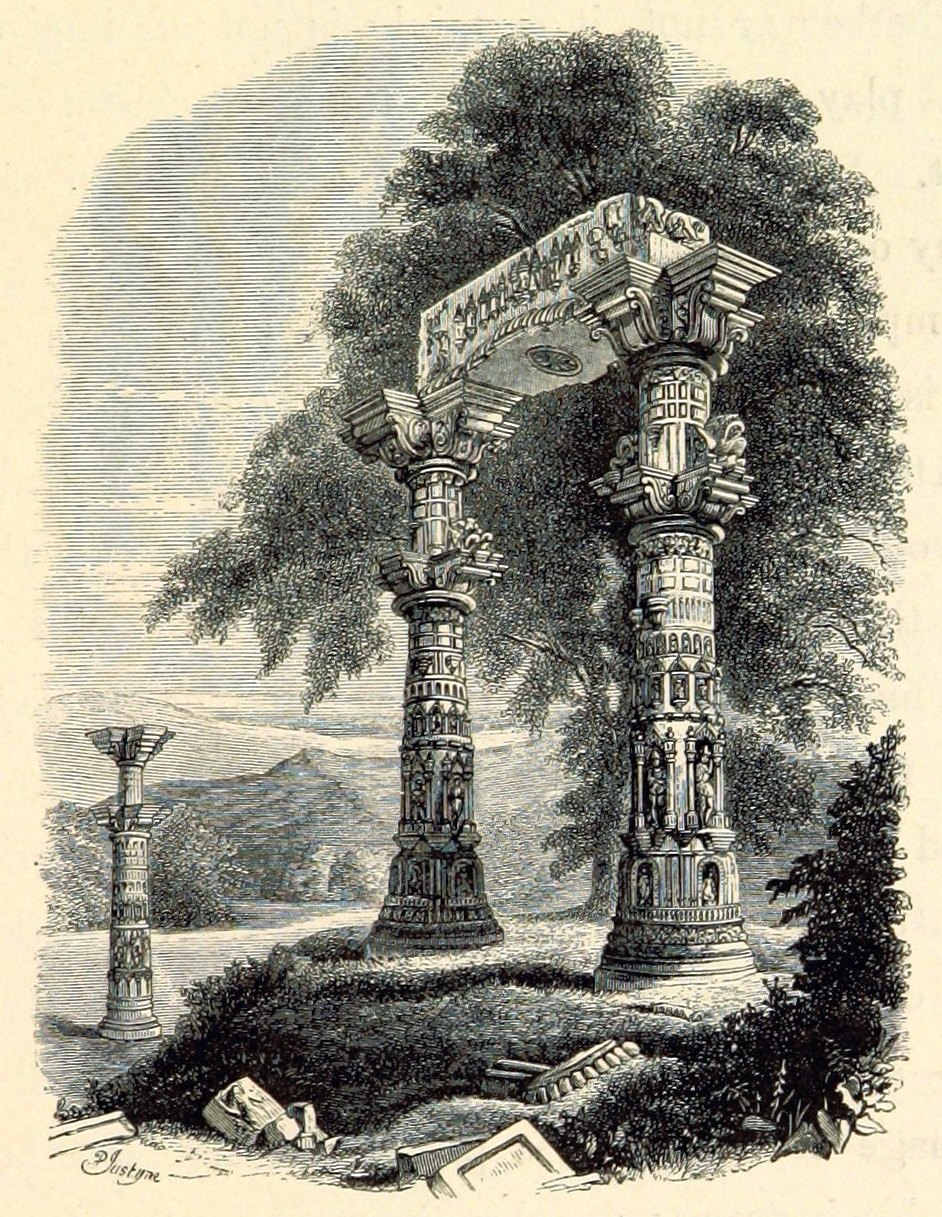
Pillars of ruined Jain temple of 13th century at Chandravati, sketched in 1866

Archeological excavations suggested that there was a large settlement at the place before the establishment of Chandravati by Paramaras. Chandravati was ruled by the Paramaras of Abu. The first Paramara ruler of the area was Sindhuraja in the early tenth century.

Chandravati was the major city in past said to once been eighteen miles in circuit. Its prosperity seems to have lasted from the seventh to the beginning of the fifteenth century. Tradition gives it an earlier origin than Dhar, making it the metropolis of Western India, when the Parmara was paramount lord to whom the nine castles of the desert were the grand subordinate fiefs. In the seventh century, then subordinate to Dhar, it proved a place of refuge to Raja Bhoj, when, by some northern invader, he was forced to flee from his capital. From the Parmars it was wrested by the Chauhan chieftains of Sirohi, and, on the establishment of the Chaulukya dynasty of Anhilwad Patan (942) the rulers of Chandravati became its vassals. The remains at Chandravati and on mount Abu seem to point to the eleventh and twelfth centuries as the time of greatest wealth and splendour. The materials recovered by excavation suggested that it was established around 7th century and expanded into a large settlement (about 50 hectare) around 10th or 11th century when it was a capital township.

In 1024 AD, Chandravati was attacked and plundered by Mahmud Ghazni when he passed through Rajasthan to attack Anhilwad Patan. After defeating Prithviraj III in 1192 AD, the Muslim army also attacked Chandravati.

In 1197, its rulers Prahladan and Dharavarsh, as feudatories to Bhimdev II (1178–1243) of Anhilwad, encamping near Abu, attempted to hold the entrance into Gujarat against Kutb-ud-din Aibak (1192–1210). Notwithstanding their strong position they were attacked, defeated, and put to flight. Great wealth fell into the victor'shands, and, as he passed on and took Anhilvada, it is probable that, on his way, he plundered Chandravati. Kutb-ud-din's expedition was little more than a passing raid, and Dharavarsh's son succeeded him. He, or his successor, was about 1270 defeated and driven out by the Chauhans of Nadol. In about 1315 AD Chandravati passed into the hands of Deora Chauhans.

Then (1304) came Alauddin Khalji's final conquest of Gujarat, and Chandravati, with Anhilwad as the centre of Muslim power, lost almost all independence. Another hundred years completed its ruin. In the beginning of the fifteenth century, by the founding of Sirohi (1405), Chandravati ceased to be the seat of a Hindu chief, and, a few years later (1411–1412), its buildings and skilled craftsmen were carried off to enrich the new capital of Sultan Ahmed Shah I (1411–1443) of Gujarat Sultanate. Since then Chandravati has remained forsaken and desolate. Even its ruins, sold and carried off as building materials, have all but disappeared. Though some are more modern, most of the Chandravati remains belong to the eleventh and twelfth centuries, the best period of Abu architecture (1032-1247).

Sahasamala Devada shifted his capital to Sirohi around 1450 AD, and from then on Chandravati lost its glory.

In 1824 Sir Charles Colville and his party, the first European visitors to Chandravati, found twenty marble edifices of different sizes. One Brahmanic temple was adorned with rich, very well executed sculptured figures and ornaments in high relief, many of the figures almost quite detached. The chief images were of Brahma, two Shiva, Mahishasuramardini, Yama. The best executed were the dancing nymphs, with garlands and musical instruments, many of them extremely graceful. Except the roof of the domes, whoso outer marble cover was gone, the temple was white marble throughout, the lustre of tho prominent part undimmed. Near the temple, two richly carved columns, supporting an entablature and sculptured pediment, are probably triumphal pillars, kirti stambh, like those at Sidhpur. When visited by British explorer Burgess in 1874, of the twenty buildings not more than three or four were left.

The remains of Chandravati was destroyed further during the construction of the railway track between Malwa and Abu road before independence. It is now a small village.

== Arts and literature ==
There were a large number of temples in Chandravati. They were mainly Shiva temples and Jain temples.

Many European scholars who visited this area in the nineteenth century have written about surviving artistic specimens. James Tod has given pictures of some of these temples in his Travels in Western India. In 1824 Charles Colville and his party visited Chandravati and found twenty marble edifices of different sizes. One temple to Brahma was adorned with rich and finely executed sculptured figures and ornaments in high relief. Another scholar, Ferguson, found the pillars so highly ornamented in details and varieties that no two pillars are exactly alike.

At present not a single temple is in order. The pieces of old temples were removed and used in temples in distant cities. The many monuments were destroyed by contractors of Rajputana Malwa Railway before independence. The remaining were stolen or were destroyed when Abu Road industrial area was extended and Palanpur-Abu Road Highway was constructed. It divided the ancient site into two parts.

Rulers of Chandravati also patronized literature. Jain monks wrote some literary works there.

== Archeology ==
At least three fortified enclosures were discovered during excavations. The largest fortification is spread over four hectares and is located in the valley of Banas river. Three residential complexes; six room complex in south eastern corner, six room complex in north eastern corner and the large hall with few rooms in south central part of the fort; were discovered. Several minor objects were also discovered from the complexes like terracotta beads, copper and iron objects, animal figures.

The other two fortifications, a large settlement, about thirty six temples, around twelve bawaris are located in the valley of Sevarni river which is a tributary of Banas.
