= Raniwara =

Raniwara Raniwara Kallan
- City
- Location in Rajasthan, India Raniwara (India)
- Coordinates: 24.7500°N 72.2167°E
- Country: India
- State: Rajasthan
- District: Jalore

Government
  - Type: Gram panchayat

Area
  - Total: 1,023.42 km^{2} (395.14 sq mi)
- Elevation: 204 m (669 ft)

Population (2022)
  - Total: 206,831
  - Density: 202.098/km^{2} (523.431/sq mi)

Languages
  - Official: Hindi
- Time zone: UTC+5:30 (IST)
- PIN: 343040
- Telephone code: 912990
- ISO 3166 code: RJ-IN
- Vehicle registration: RJ-16 & RJ-46 (NEW)

Raniwara is a town in Jalore district of Rajasthan state in India. Situated 35 km (22 mi) south of the Bhinmal on Jalore-Sanchore road, it is headquarters of the tehsil by Raniwala Kallan. Raniwara is 109 km (68 mi) from Abu Raj (Mount Abu) and 20 km (12 mi) from the town of Bhinmal.

It is part of the Raniwara Assembly constituency. Ratan Dewasi of Congress won as MLA in the 2023 Rajasthan Assembly election.

Raniwara is connected By Samdari-Bhildi railway line. There is a big dairy plant of Rajasthan in the town run by Jalore-Sirohi Zila Dugdh Utpadak Sahakari Sangh Ltd. Malwara, Badgaon, Ajodar, Jakhri, Dhanol, Badgaon, Silasan, Mokhatra, Sewadiya, Meda, Varetha and Raniwara Khurd are some of its nearby villages. In 2026, Rs.535 crore was sanctioned in the state budget to expand the Sanchore-Raniwara-Mandar-Revdar road.

The Sundha Mata temple is located 20 km (12 mi) From Raniwara. The temple is situated on a hilltop called 'Sundha', at 72°-22' E longitude and 24°-50' N latitude. Garba Chowk Temple of Mother Goddess in Raniwara where Garba dance is performed during Navratri days.The Hinglaj Mata temple is also in Raniwara. It is the seat of Hinglaj goddess and worshipped by Khatri community. Pipaji temple is also situated here Pipaji was a lok sant worship by Pipa Khatriya community.
