= Abu Road =

Abu Road Kharadi
- City, Sub-District
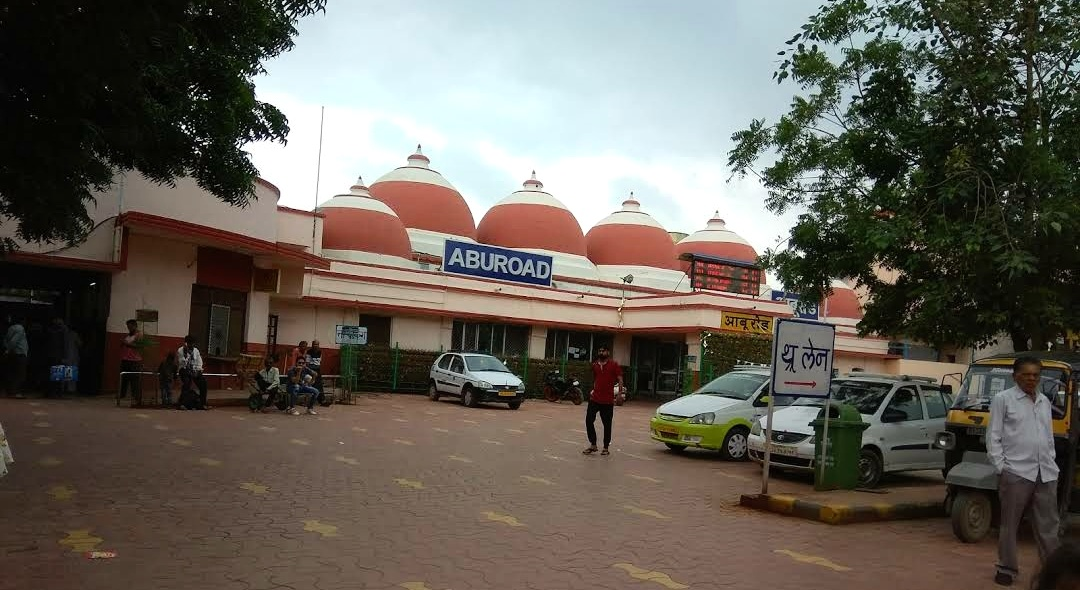
- Abu Road Railway Station

- Location in Rajasthan, India Abu Road (India)
- Coordinates: 24.48°N 72.78°E
- Country: India
- State: Rajasthan
- District: Sirohi
- Subdivision (India): Abu Road
- Tehsil: Abu Road

Government
  - Type: Municipal
  - Body: Abu Road Municipal
  - MP: Lumbaram Choudhary
  - MLA: Motiram Koli
- Elevation: 263 m (863 ft)

Population (2011)
  - Total: 224,404

Languages
  - Official: Hindi, English
  - Local: Rajasthani
- Time zone: UTC+5:30 (IST)
- PIN: 307026, 307510
- Telephone code: 91-2974
- Vehicle registration: RJ-38 Abu Road, DTO

Abu Road is a city and sub-district in Sirohi district of Rajasthan state in western India, lies on the bank of West Banas River. It is the tehsil and sub-district headquarters and the largest city in Sirohi District in terms of area and population. Its railway station is an important stop on the main Indian Railways line between New Delhi and Ahmedabad and registers an impressive growth in passenger traffic and revenue generation for North Western Railway zone. The popular hill station, Mount Abu is 27 km up the hill from Abu Road.

The Industrial city is located in the southernmost part of Rajasthan, near the Gujarat border. It is surrounded by the Aravalli Range, which separates it from the Thar Desert. It is around 482 km from Jaipur, approximately 151 km from Udaipur and 197 km from Ahmedabad. Placed almost in the middle of major Indian metro cities. Besides, connectivity with Gujarat ports and cities, it has a strategic geographical advantage. The main industries are marble & granite, miniature cement plants, HDPE bags, synthetic yarns, mineral grinding, ABS resin, Steel and insulators.

== History ==
The old name of Abu Road city was Kharadi. The Rajputana–Malwa Railway set up the railway station here on 30 December 1880, and the station was named Abu Road. The road to Mount Abu was built in 1845, during the rule of Maharao Shiv Singh of Sirohi.

== Demographics ==
As of the 2011 India census, Abu Road had a population of 55,595. Males constitute 52% of the population and females 48%. Abu Road has an average literacy rate of 80.81%, higher than the state average of 66.11%.89.63% of the males and 70.97% of females are literate. 11.89% of the population is under 6 years of age.

As of the 2011 India census, Abu Road Tehsil had population of 2,24,404 of which 1,16,769 are males and 1,07,635 are females. It had 43,041 households. The population of children between age 0-6 is 40,421 which is 18.01% of total population.

== Geography ==
Abu Road is an important Industrial and commercial city in the southwestern region of Rajasthan State on the bank of West Banas river.

City is surrounded by Aravali hill range and about 482 kms from state capital Jaipur and about 248 kms from Jodhpur City. It lies southeast of Mount Abu, which is approx. 27 km up the hill and an important tourist destination. In addition, famous Ambaji temple in Gujarat State is approx. 19 kms from the city.

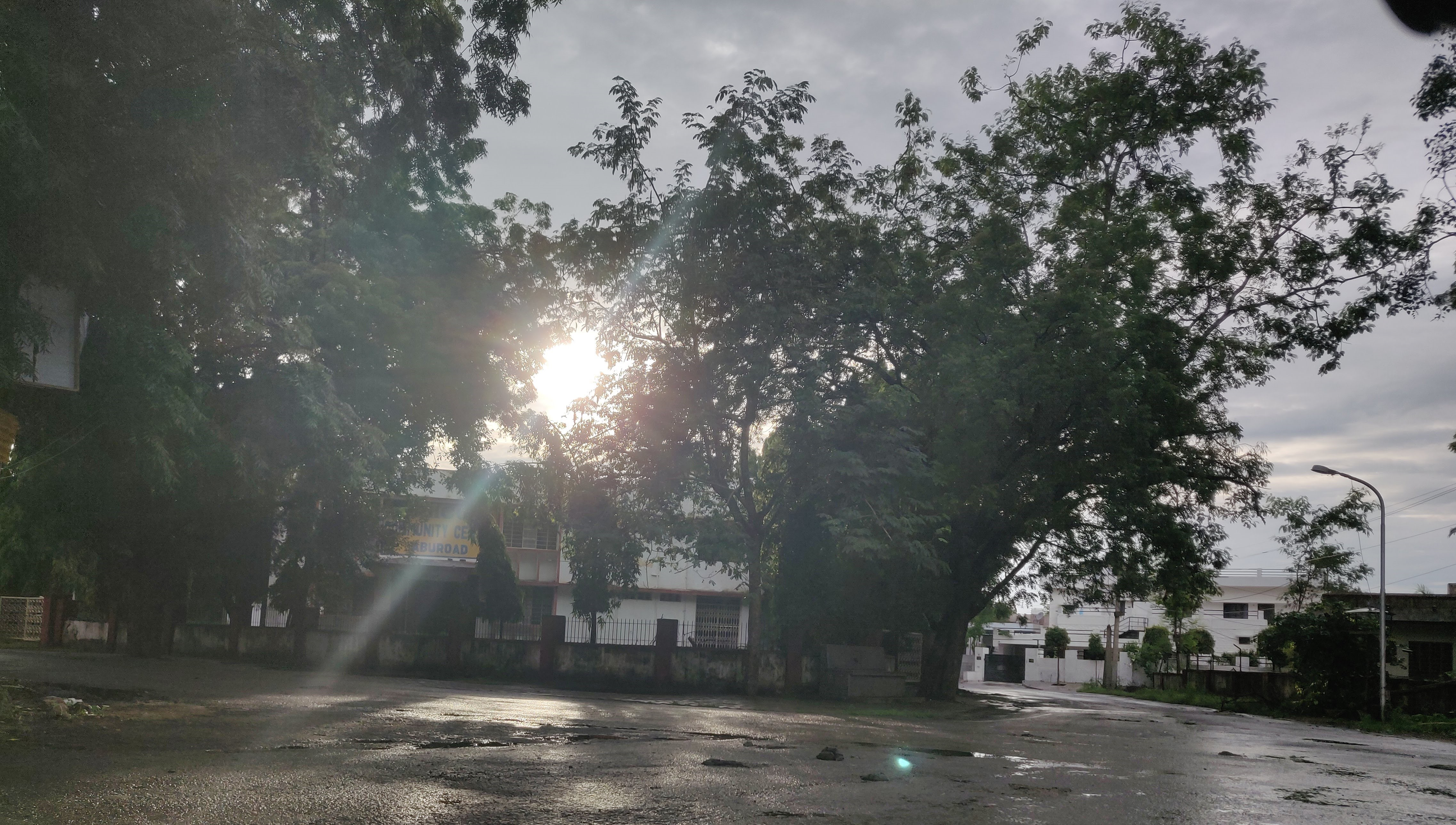
Riico Colony, an important residential area in Abu Road.

The city starts its geographical boundary from Talhati in North to Maval in south adjoining Gujarat-Rajasthan Border covering residential areas of Talhati, Akrabhatta, Manpur, Ganka, Tartoli, Railway Colony, Riico Housing Colony, Santpur and parts of Chandrawati.

=== Climate ===
Abu Road has a hot semi-arid climate (Köppen BSh), typical of northwestern India. In Summer, it's hot and humid with an average temperature of 40 °C or 104 °F and hot sandy winds. In winter, minimal can fall to 7 to 14 °C (44.6 to 57.2 °F), which is cool compared to other cities in Rajasthan and during the monsoon, the average rainfall is about 14 to 20 inches or 360 to 510 millimetres per season.

Climate data for Abu Road
Month	Jan	Feb	Mar	Apr	May	Jun	Jul	Aug	Sep	Oct	Nov	Dec	Year
Mean daily maximum °C (°F)	24.5 (76.1)	27.3 (81.1)	32 (90)	36.4 (97.5)	37.7 (99.9)	35.3 (95.5)	29.9 (85.8)	28.3 (82.9)	29.9 (85.8)	31.9 (89.4)	29 (84)	25.6 (78.1)	30.7 (87.2)
Mean daily minimum °C (°F)	10.2 (50.4)	12.9 (55.2)	17.8 (64.0)	22.2 (72.0)	24.3 (75.7)	25.4 (77.7)	24.1 (75.4)	23.1 (73.6)	22.4 (72.3)	20.6 (69.1)	16.3 (61.3)	11.7 (53.1)	19.3 (66.6)
Average rainfall mm (inches)	3 (0.1)	3 (0.1)	2 (0.1)	1 (0.0)	4 (0.2)	56 (2.2)	281 (11.1)	223 (8.8)	92 (3.6)	16 (0.6)	4 (0.2)	1 (0.0)	686 (27)

== Economy ==
=== RIICO Industrial Area ===
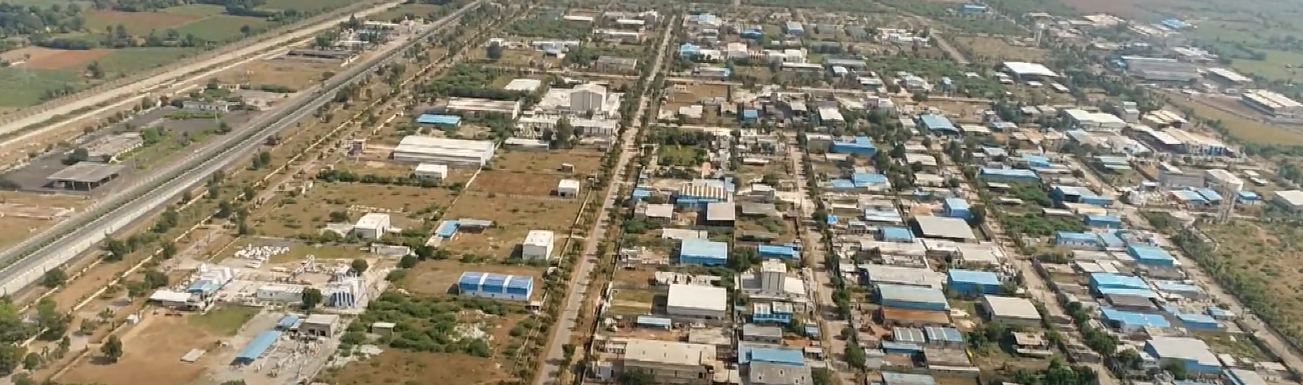
Riico Industrial Area, Abu Road City

RIICO Industrial Area is spread over an expanse of 2,000 acres (8.1 km^{2}). Riico office at Abu Road is the administrative head quarter for Sirohi District covering Arbuda, Ambaji, Sheoganj, Sheoganj Ext., Sirohi Road, Sirohi, Sarneshwar, Swaroopganj, Mandar, Growth Center 1st and 2nd phase. The main industries are marble & granite, miniature cement plants, HDPE bags, synthetic yarns, mineral grinding, ABS resin, Steel, Electronics and Electrical, and insulators.

Industrial areas in Riico, Abu Road are:

- Ambaji Industrial Area
- Arbuda Industrial Area
- Growth Center 1st Phase
- Growth Center 2nd Phase

=== Diesel Shed ===
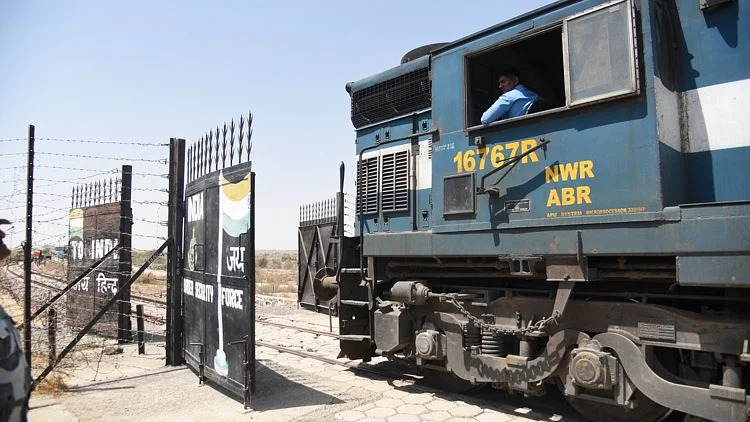
ABR WDM with Thar Express crossing India-Pakistan border.

The railway's diesel loco shed, Abu Road provides employment to a large number of people and holds an important place in town's economy. The Diesel Shed at Abu Road was commissioned by Indian Railways as a metre gauge shed on 26 October 1966. It was then the largest MG shed of Western Railway with holdings of 112 locomotives. With broad gauge conversion, the shed was converted to a BG shed with holdings of 60 locomotives. There are 68 supervisors and 570 workers in the shed.

A diesel training centre is located at the shed that conducts promotional, refresher and special courses for locomotive running staff as well as formal training of shed maintenance staff.

=== Modern Insulators Ltd. ===
Modern Insulators Ltd. manufacturing plant is situated in the town providing employment to many locals.

== Transport ==
The financial hub and the largest city in Sirohi district is well-connected by road and rail.

=== Rail ===
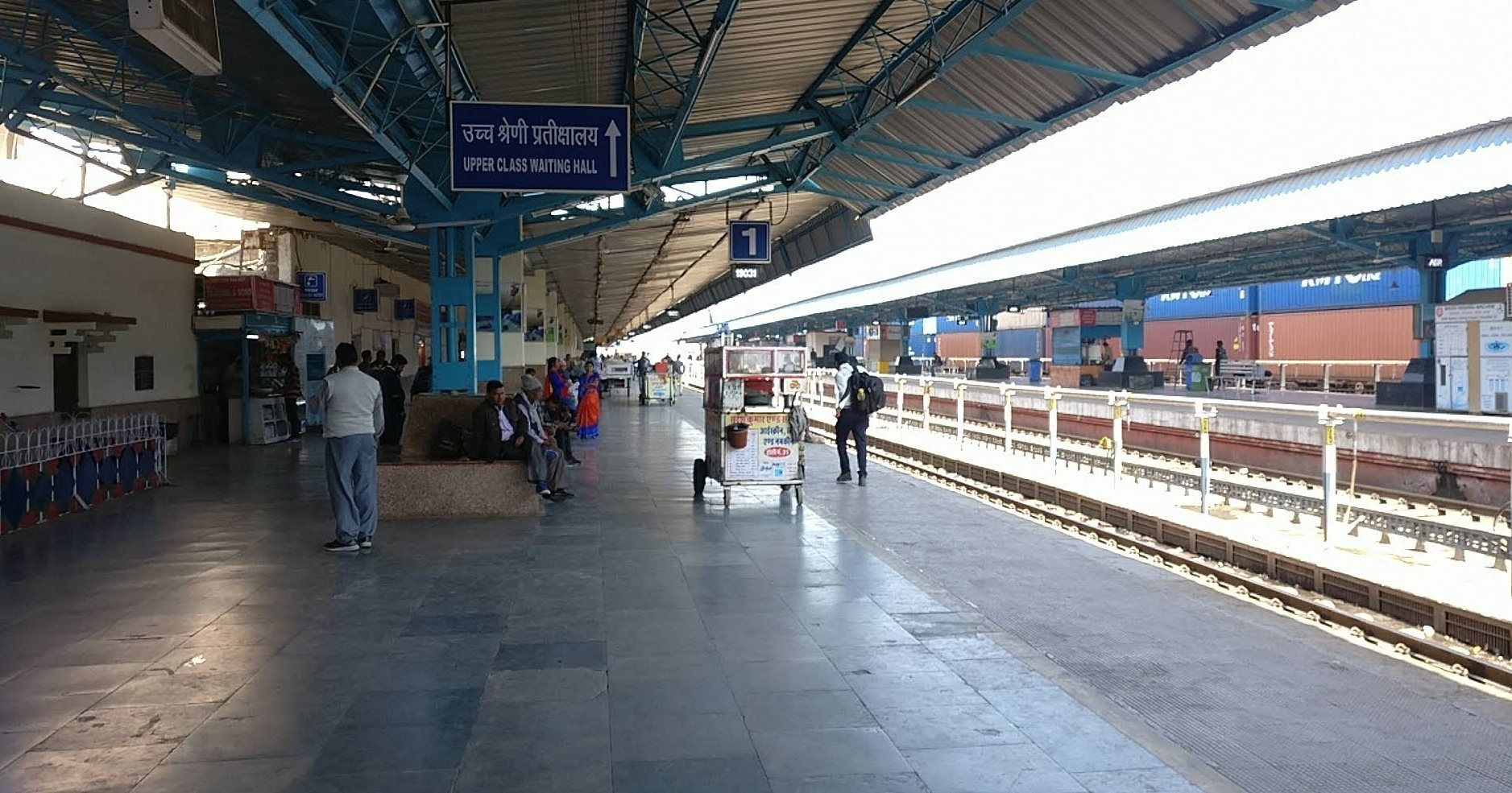
Platform 1,2 and 3 of Abu Road (ABR)

Abu Road railway station comes under the administrative control of North Western Railway zone of the Indian Railways. It has direct rail links on the broad gauge to the cities of Chennai, Thiruvananthapuram, Mysore, Hubballi, Bangalore, Pune, Mumbai, Jaipur, Jodhpur, Delhi, Dehradun, Muzaffarpur, Bareilly and Jammu. It is connected to most of the cities and towns in Gujarat such as Ahmedabad, Surat, Vadodra, Bhuj and Porbandar. It serves railway transport facility to Sirohi district and Jalor district.

=== Road ===
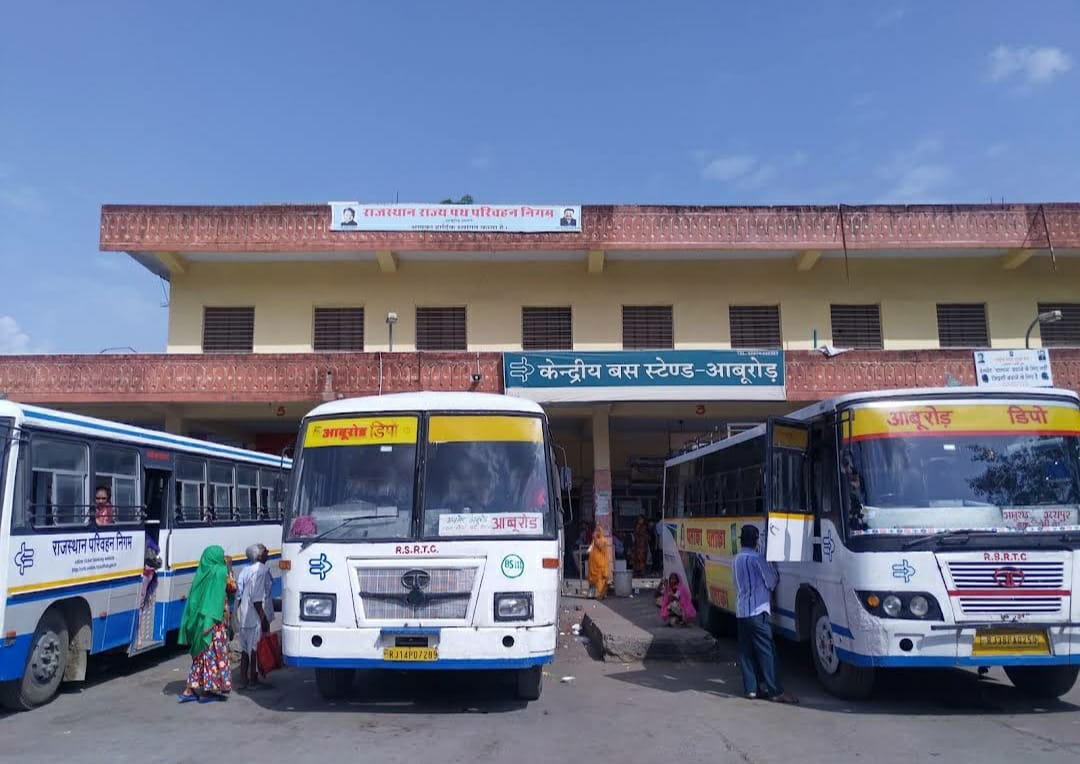
RSRTC Bus Stand, Abu Road

National Highway 27 connecting Beawar in Rajasthan with Radhanpur in Gujarat passes through Abu Road, thus connecting it with the cities of Pali, Palanpur. Further, State Highways in Gujarat SH 712, SH 132 pass through Palanpur and connect Abu Road with nearby towns in Gujarat. State Highway SH 41 connects it with Mehsana & Ahmedabad. Abu Road is well connected via bus, more than 150 buses depart from Abu road to other cities. State Highway 11 (Rajasthan) further connects it with Sanchore via Reodar, Mandar and Raniwara. Ambaji, Gujarat is 20 km (12 mi) away by road.

=== Air ===
Abu Road has its own Air Strip which is not in use for transport purpose. The nearest domestic Airport is the Maharana Pratap Airport, Udaipur which is 164 km (102 mi) away and nearest International Airport is the Sardar Vallabhbhai Patel International Airport, Ahmedabad which is 193 km (120 mi) far.

== Places of interest ==
- Chandravati
- Jirawala
- Bhadrakali Temple
- Ambaji Temple
- Mount Abu which is 30 minutes away from Abu Road.
- Mungathala
- Brahma Kumaris
- Shree Pavapuri Tirth Dham, a Jain temple complex and Gau Shala
- Rishikesh Temple which is 15 minutes away from Abu Road railway station.
- Markundeshwar Mahadev in Nichlagarh (20 km from Abu Road.

== Gallery ==
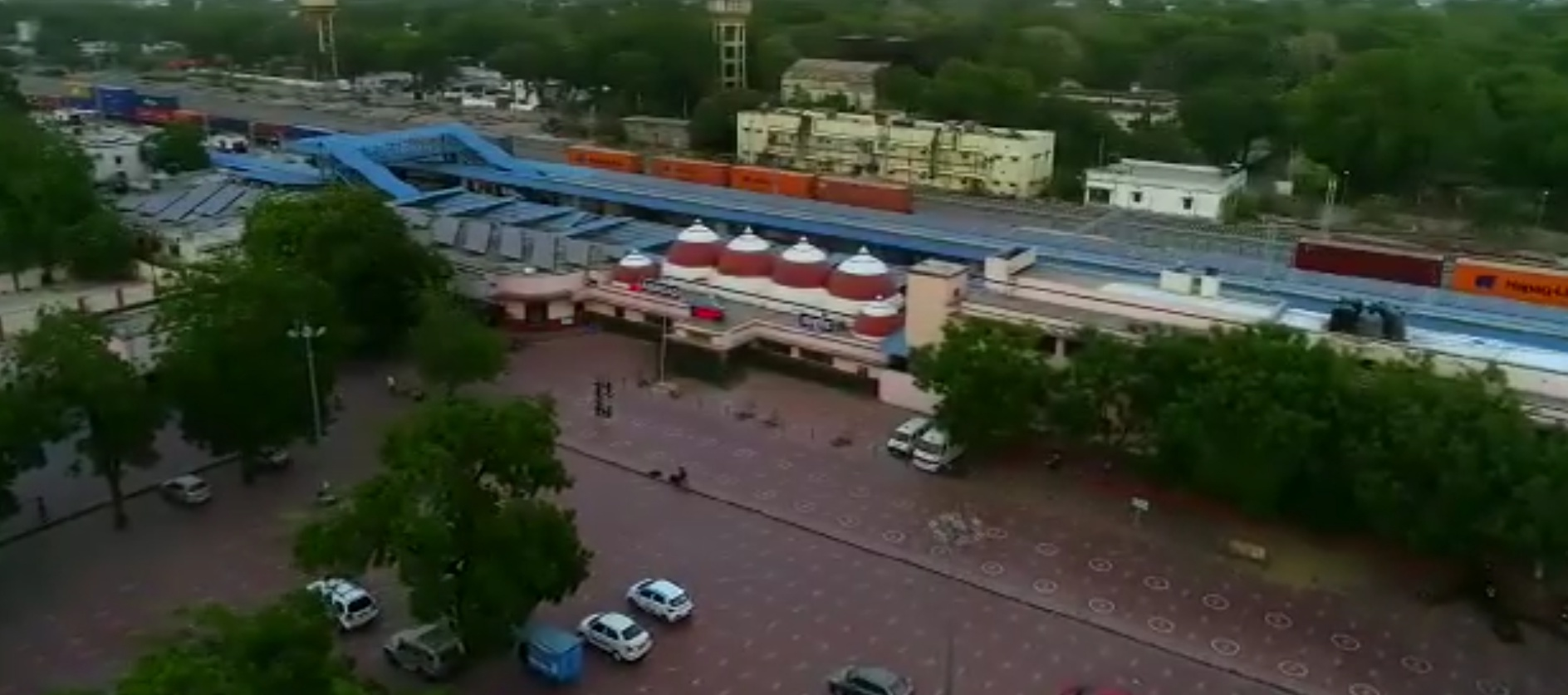
Abu Road Railway station

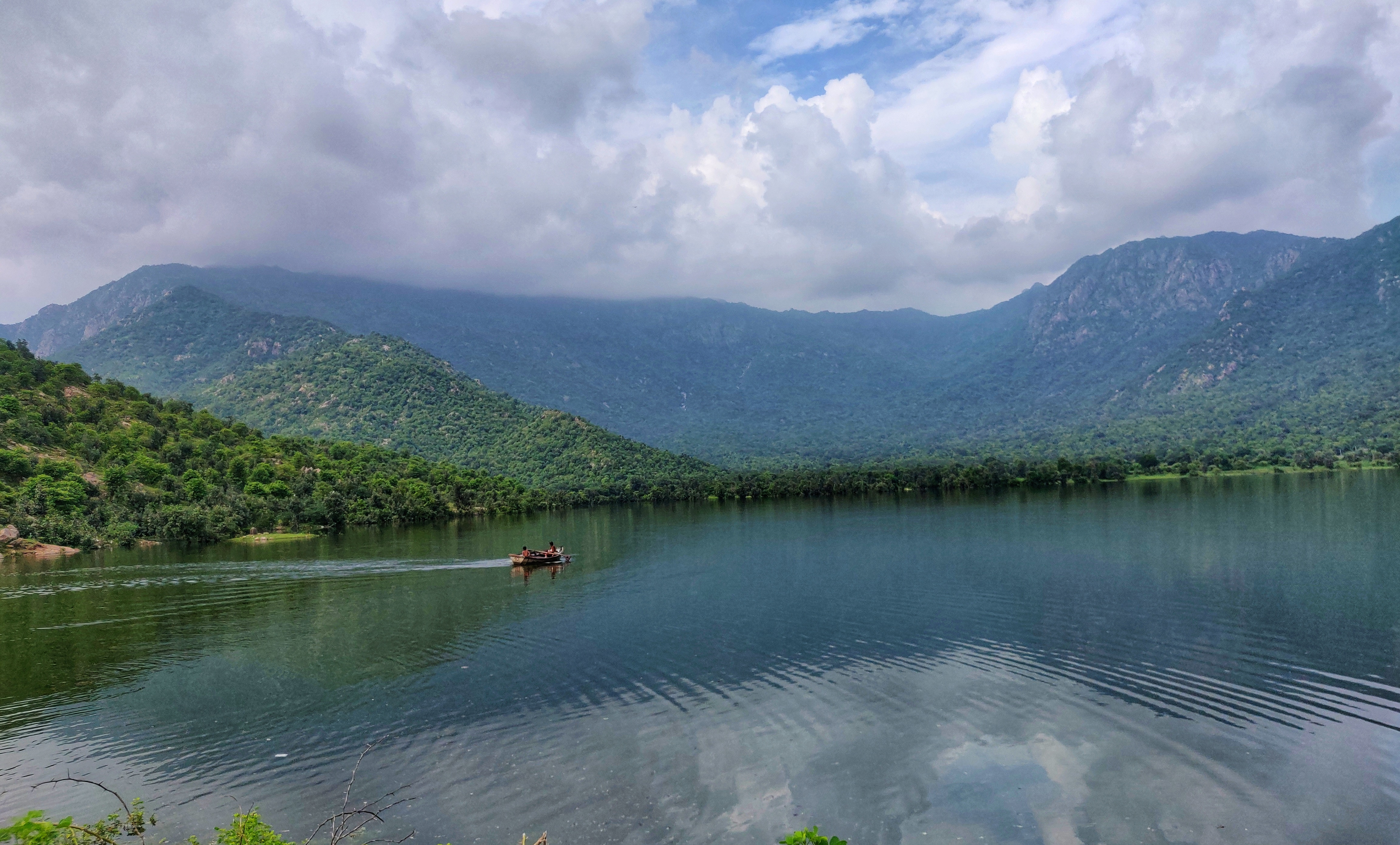
Chandelao Dam near Abu Road

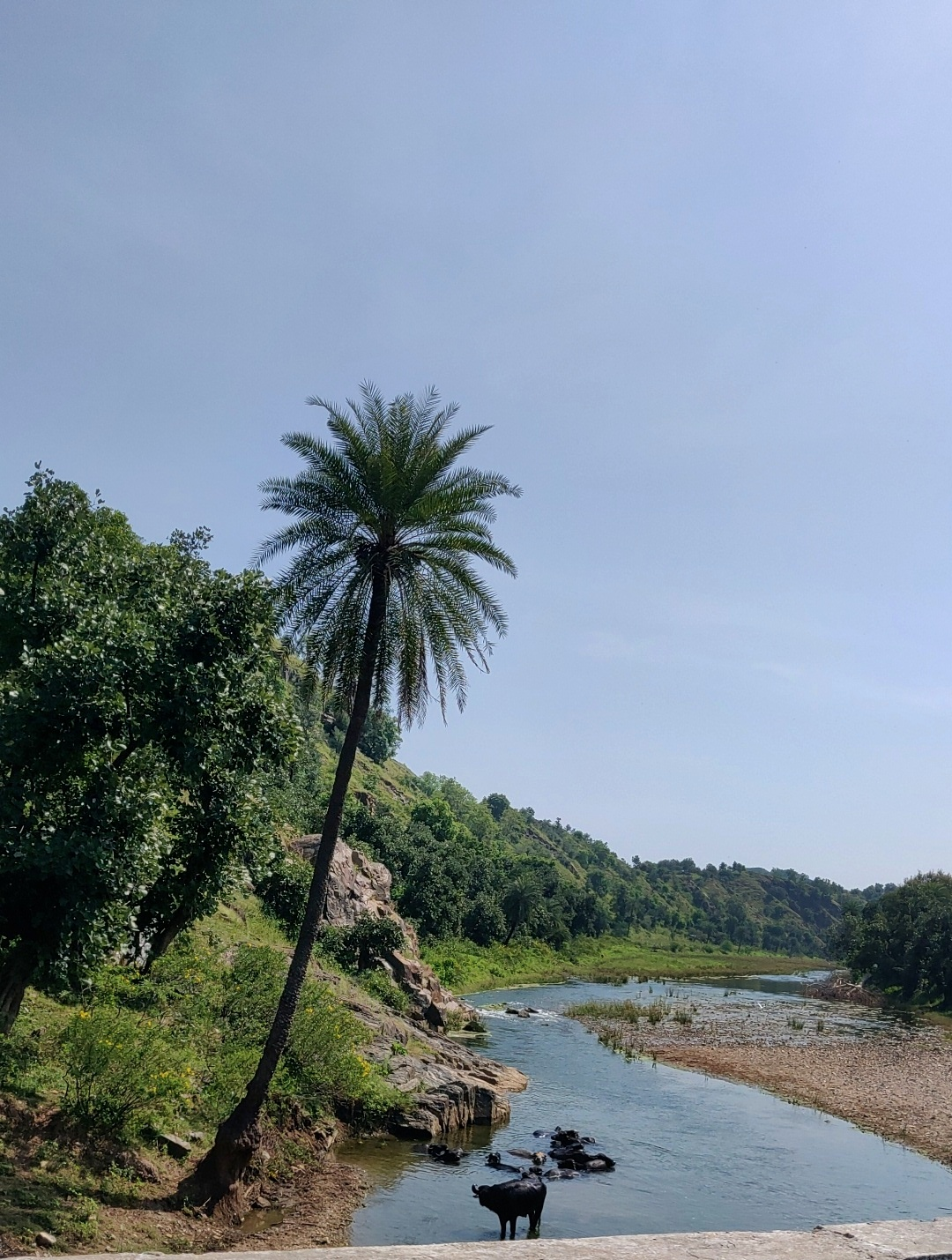
Neechlagarh near Abu Road

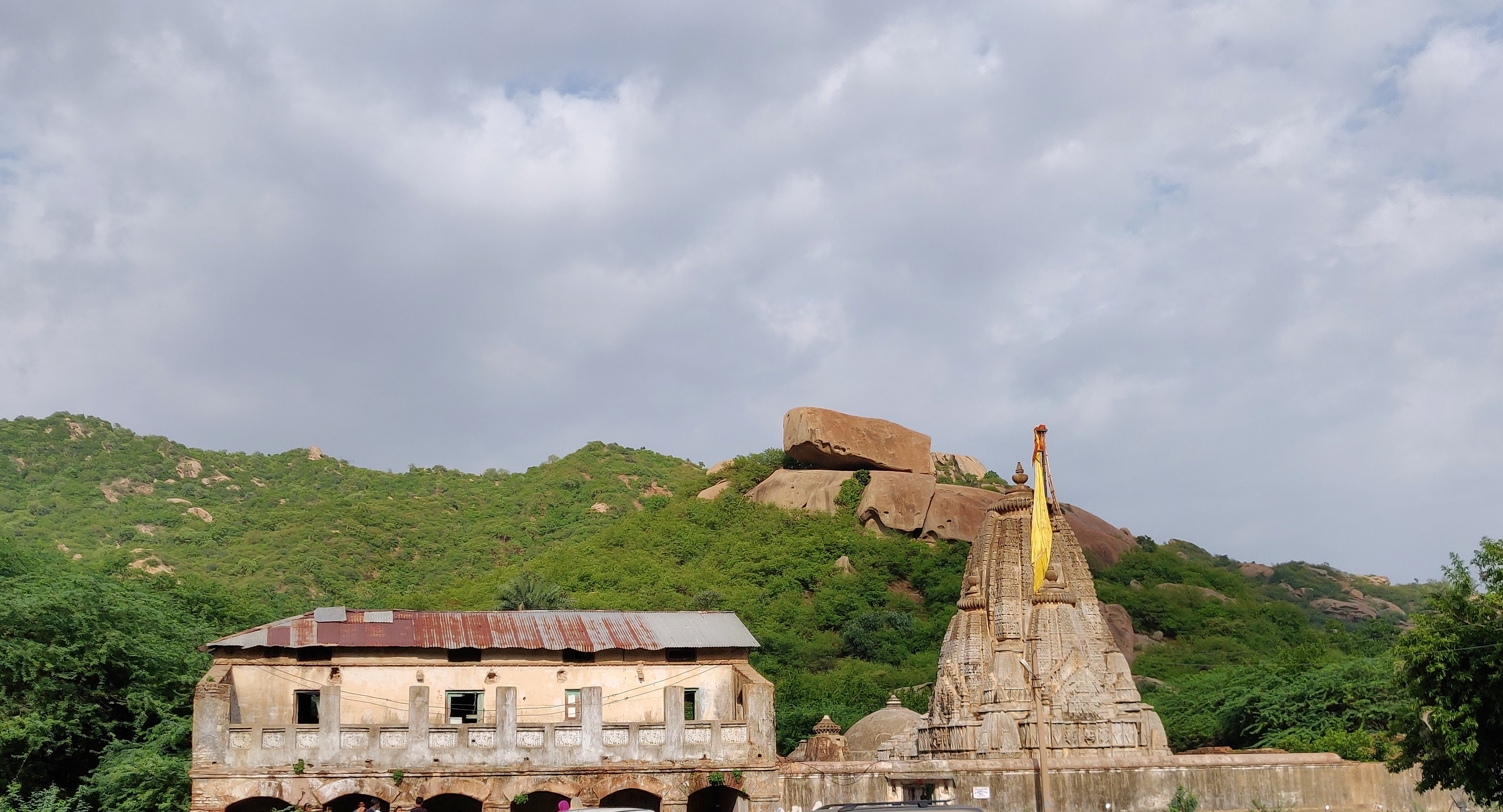
Rishikesh Temple in Abu Road

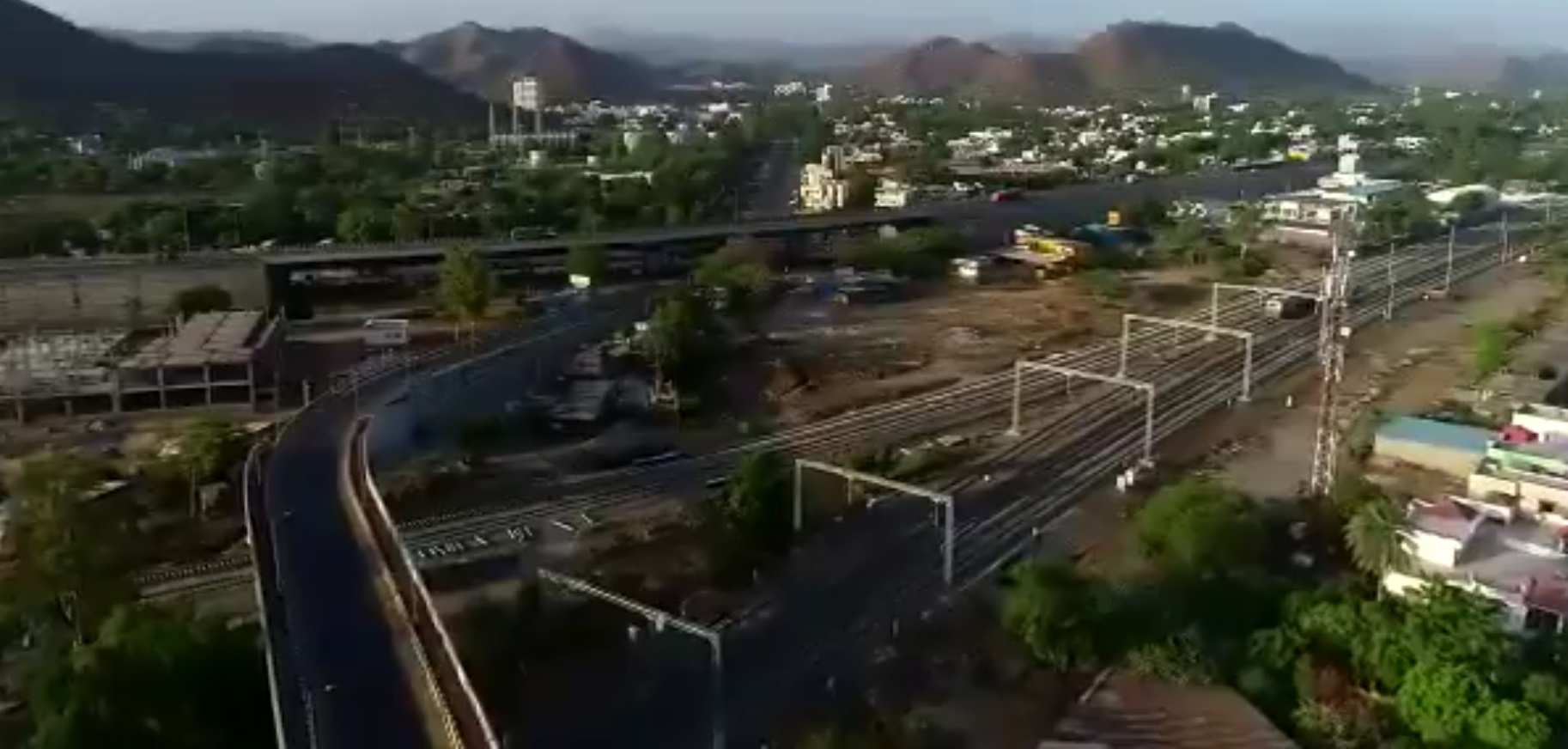
Top view of Abu Road

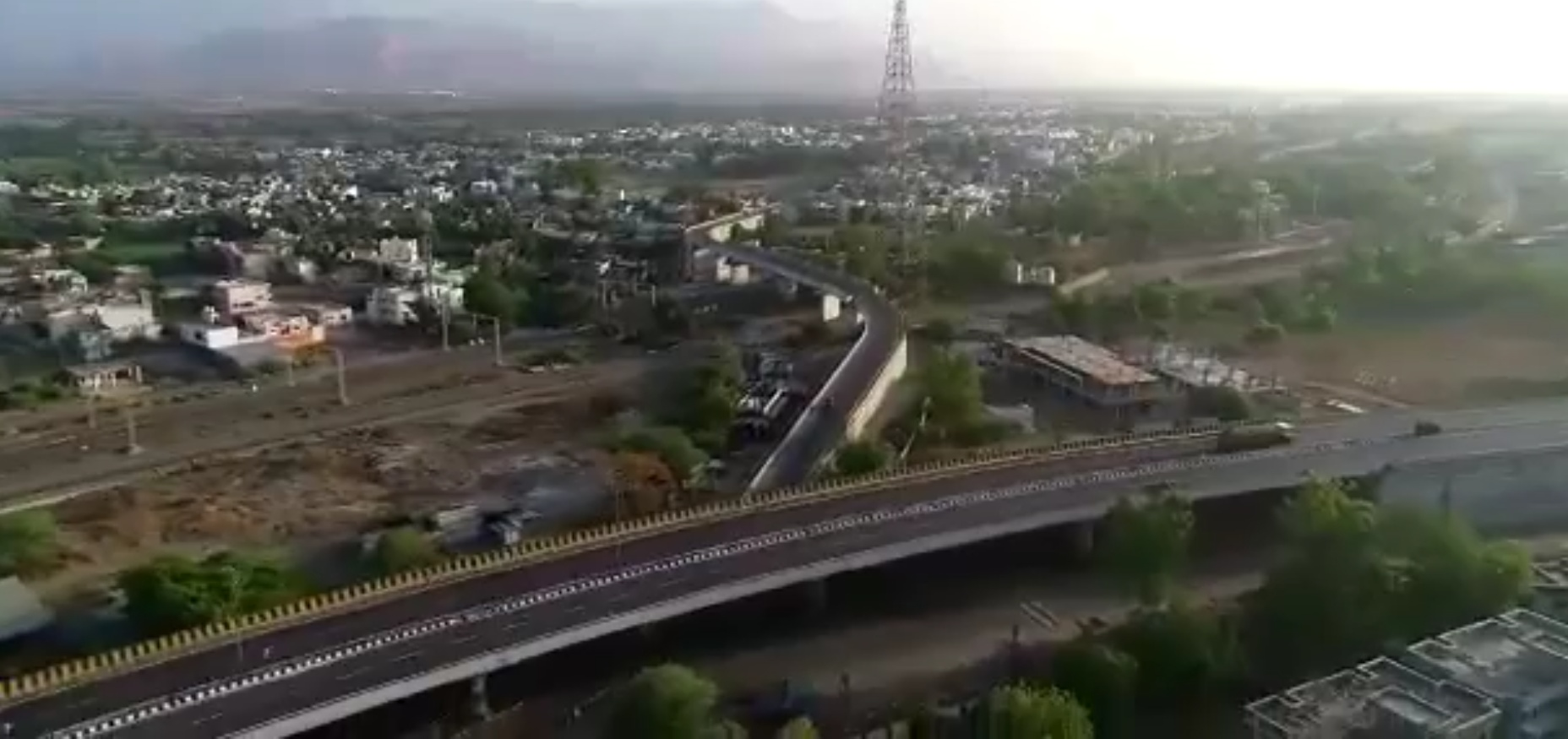
Top view of Abu Road 2

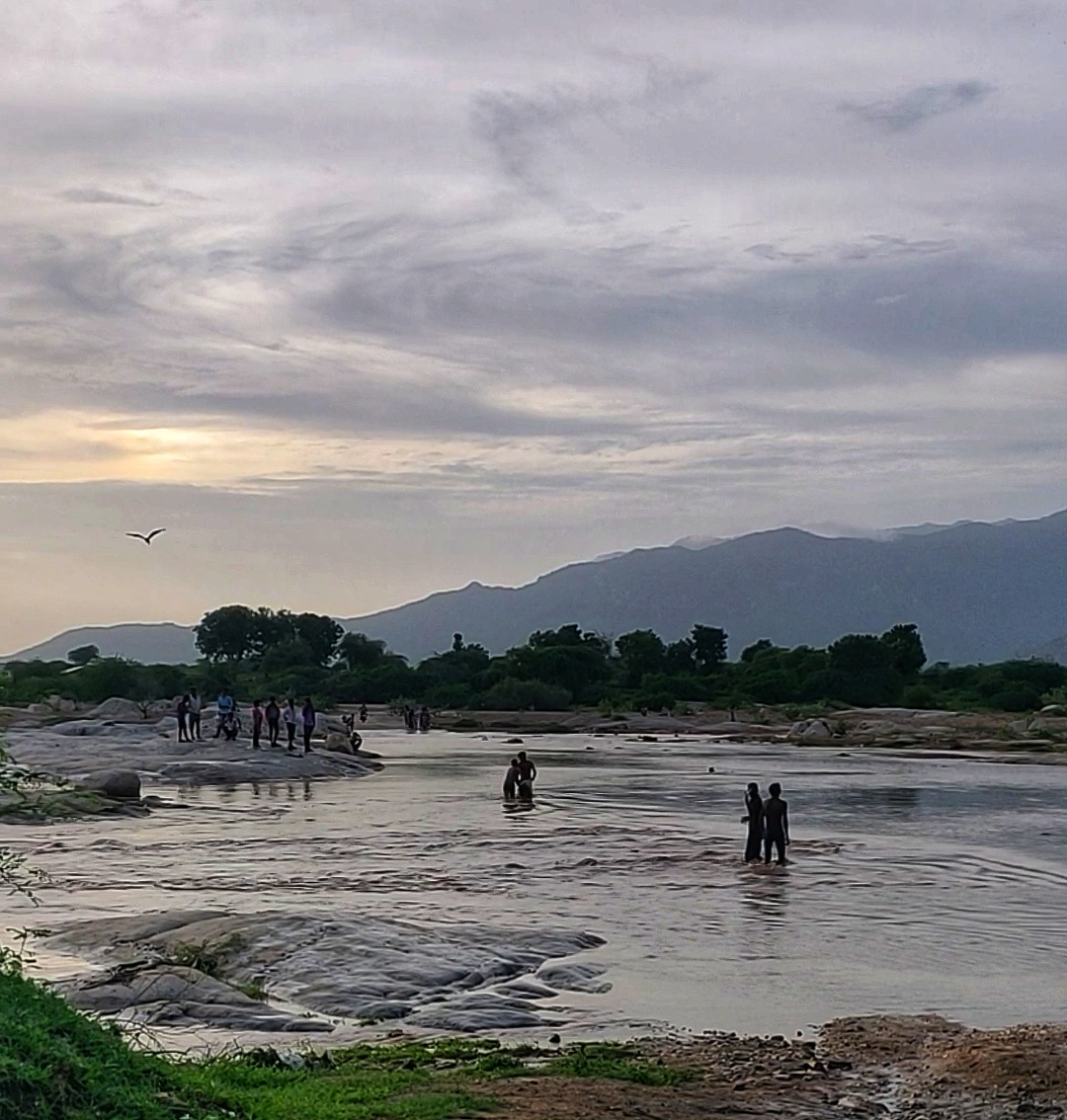
West Banas River in Abu Road

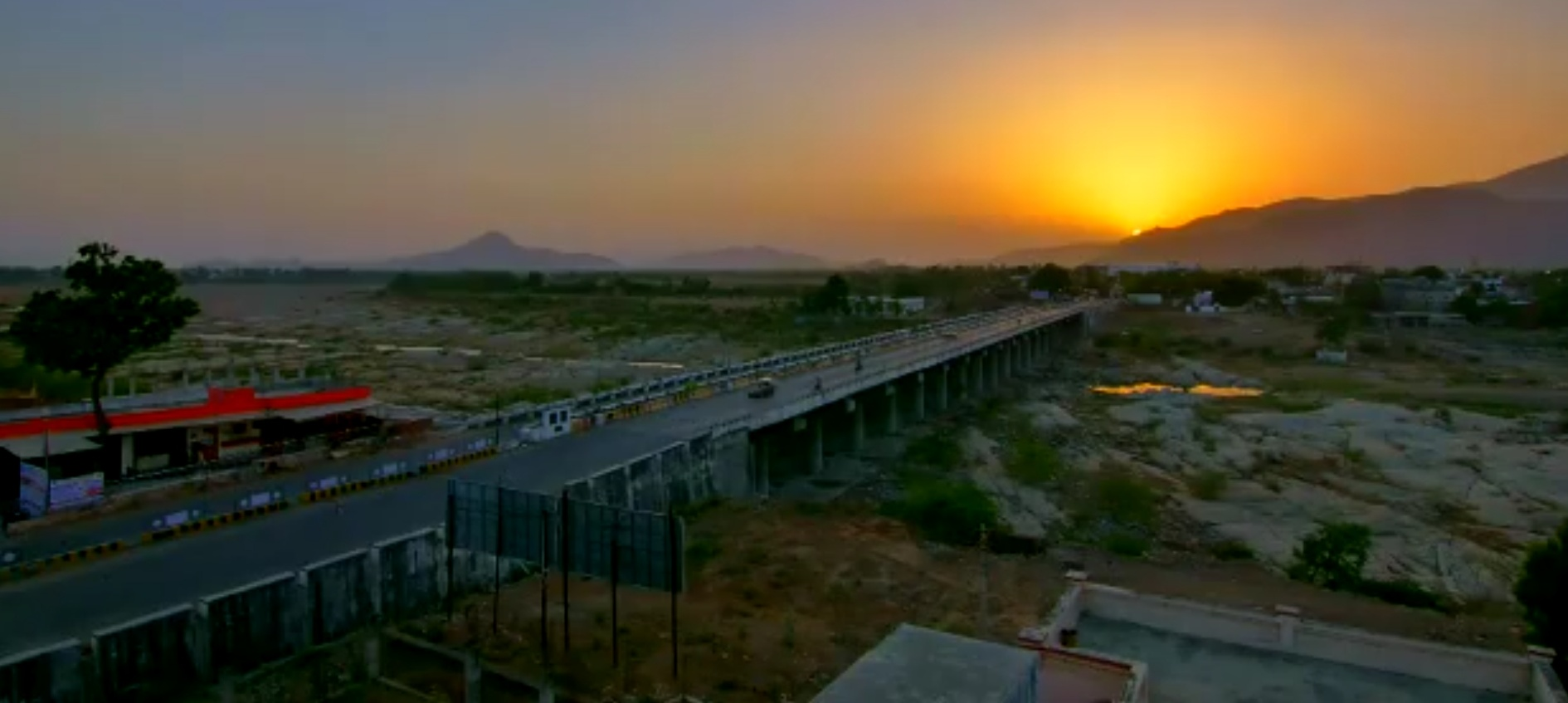
Rajwada Bridge at Abu Road
