= Chitalwana =

Tehsil in Rajasthan, India

Chitalwana Chitalwana Nagar
- Tehsil
- Location in Rajasthan, India Chitalwana (India)
- Coordinates: 24°55′30″N 71°39′35″E
- Country: India
- State: Rajasthan
- District: Jalore

Government
  - Pradhan: Prakash Kanwar (Indian National Congress)
  - SDM: Hanumana Ram

Population (2011)
  - Total: 8,141

Languages
  - Official: Hindi, Rajasthani
- Time zone: UTC+5:30 (IST)
- PIN: 343041
- Area code: 02979
- Vehicle registration: RJ46
- MLA: Jivaram Choudhary

Chitalwana is a Tehsil of Jalore district of Rajasthan, India. It is about 30 km (19 mi) from it. The town is frequently flooded by River Luni and the overflowing of Narmada canals. The area is severely lacking in basic infrastructure, healthcare facilities and basic amenities with low literacy rate and high amount of interstate migration to adjacent states of Gujarat and Maharashtra.
