= Reodar =

Reodar Revdar Reodar
- Town
- Nickname: NA
- Location in Rajasthan, India Reodar (India)
- Coordinates: 24.618909°N 72.527942°E
- Country: India
- State: Rajasthan
- District: Sirohi
- Named for: Beauty of nature, river and mountains.

Government
  - Type: Congress
  - Body: Gram Panchayat
- Elevation: 249 m (817 ft)

Population (2011)
  - Total: 6,824

Languages
  - Official: Hindi, Marwari, Gujarati
- Time zone: UTC+5:30 (IST)
- Postal code: 307514
- Area code: +91 02975
- ISO 3166 code: RJ-IN
- Vehicle registration: RJ-24
- Nearest city: Sirohi, Abu road, Mount abu, Mehsana Mandar
- Lok Sabha constituency: Jalore (Lok Sabha constituency) Lumbaram choudhary
- Vidhan Sabha constituency: Reodar- Motiram koli
- Civic agency: Gram Panchayat

Reodar is a town in Sirohi District of Rajasthan state in India. It is situated at 52 km east of the Sirohi. It is headquarters of the tehsil as well as Panchayat Samiti by the same name. Mandar is the main village connecting Reodar to Gujarat.

It is also a Legislative Assembly Constituency of Rajasthan.

It is the main town between Rajasthan and Gujarat it lies on border.

== See also ==
- Magariwara
