= Sirohi =

Sirohi Hirohi Devnagri
- Town
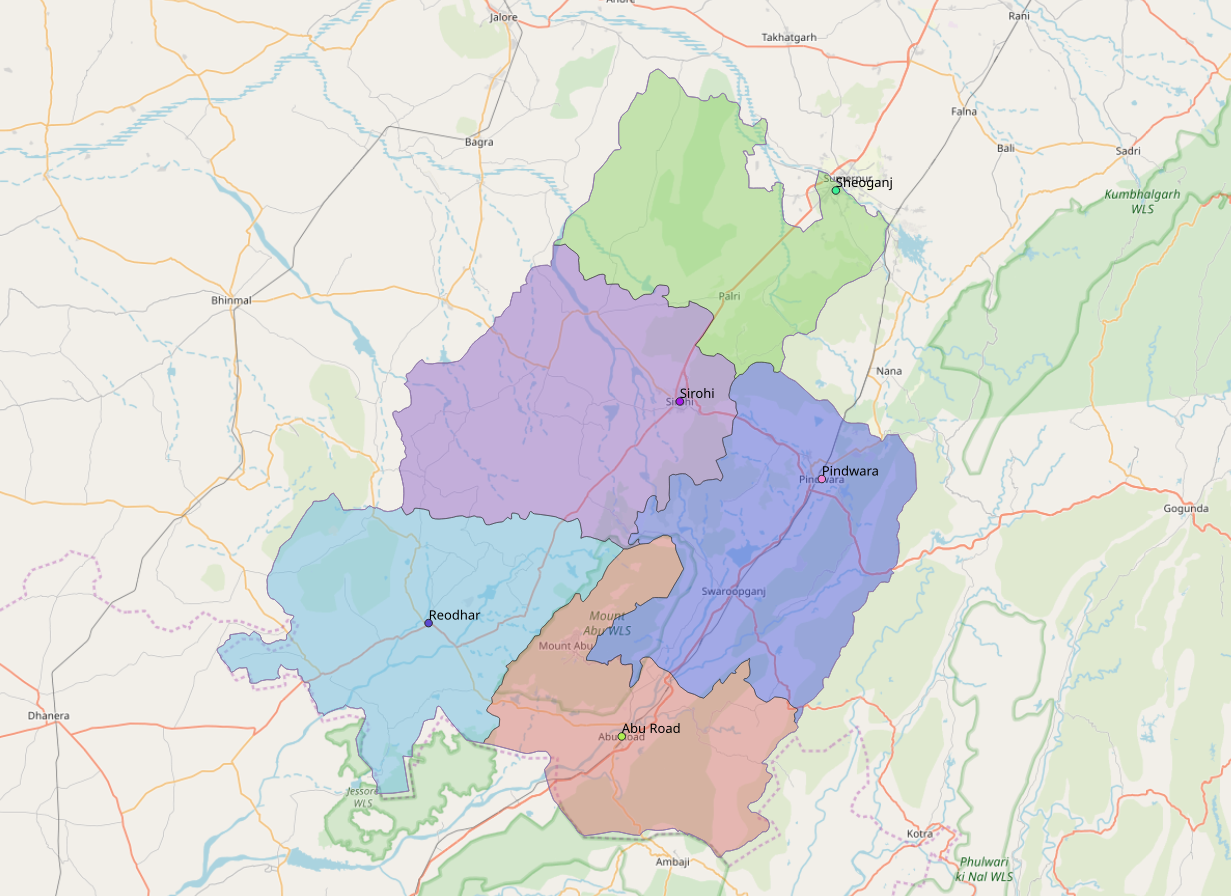
- Sirohi town in Sirohi tehsil of Sirohi district, Rajasthan

- Location in Rajasthan, India Sirohi (India)
- Coordinates: 24.885°N 72.8625°E
- Country: India
- State: Rajasthan
- District: Sirohi
- Founded: aft. 1450
- Founder: Rao Sobhaji, Sehastramal

Government
  - Type: Rajasthan Government
  - Body: Municipal Council/Nagar Parishad, Sirohi
  - MP: Lumbaram Choudhary
  - MLA: Otaram Dewasi

Area
  - Total: 5,179 km^{2} (2,000 sq mi)
- Elevation: 321 m (1,053 ft)

Population (2011)
  - Total: 39,229 (Urban)
  - Density: 164/km^{2} (420/sq mi)
- Demonym: Sirohian

Languages
  - Official: Hindi
  - Local: Rajasthani
- Time zone: UTC+5:30 (IST)
- PIN: 307001
- Telephone code: 02972
- Vehicle registration: RJ-24
- Nearest city: Ahmedabad, Jalore, Pali, Barmer, Patan, Udaipur, Reodar, Abu Road, Pindwara
- Avg. summer temperature: 42 °C (108 °F)
- Avg. winter temperature: 6 °C (43 °F)
- Website: sirohi.rajasthan.gov.in

Sirohi is a town, located in Sirohi district in southern Rajasthan state in western India. It is the administrative headquarters of Sirohi District and was formerly the capital of the princely state of Sirohi ruled by Deora Chauhan Rajput rulers. The nearest railway station to Sirohi is Sirohi Road railway station.

== Geography ==
Sirohi is located at 24.885°N 72.8625°E. It has an average elevation of 321 metres (1053 ft).

== History ==
In 1405, Rao Sobhaji founded the town of Shivpuri on the eastern slope of Siranwa Hill. Shivpuri today lies in ruins. In 1425, Sobhaji's son and successor, Sehastramal (or Sainsmal), founded a fortress on the eastern slope of the same hill, which became his capital and grew into the present-day town of Sirohi.

== See also ==
- Pavapuri
- Sirohi (Rajasthan Assembly Constituency)
- Mirpur Jain Temple
