= Sirohi district =

Coordinates: 24°53′06″N 72°51′45″E

- District of Rajasthan
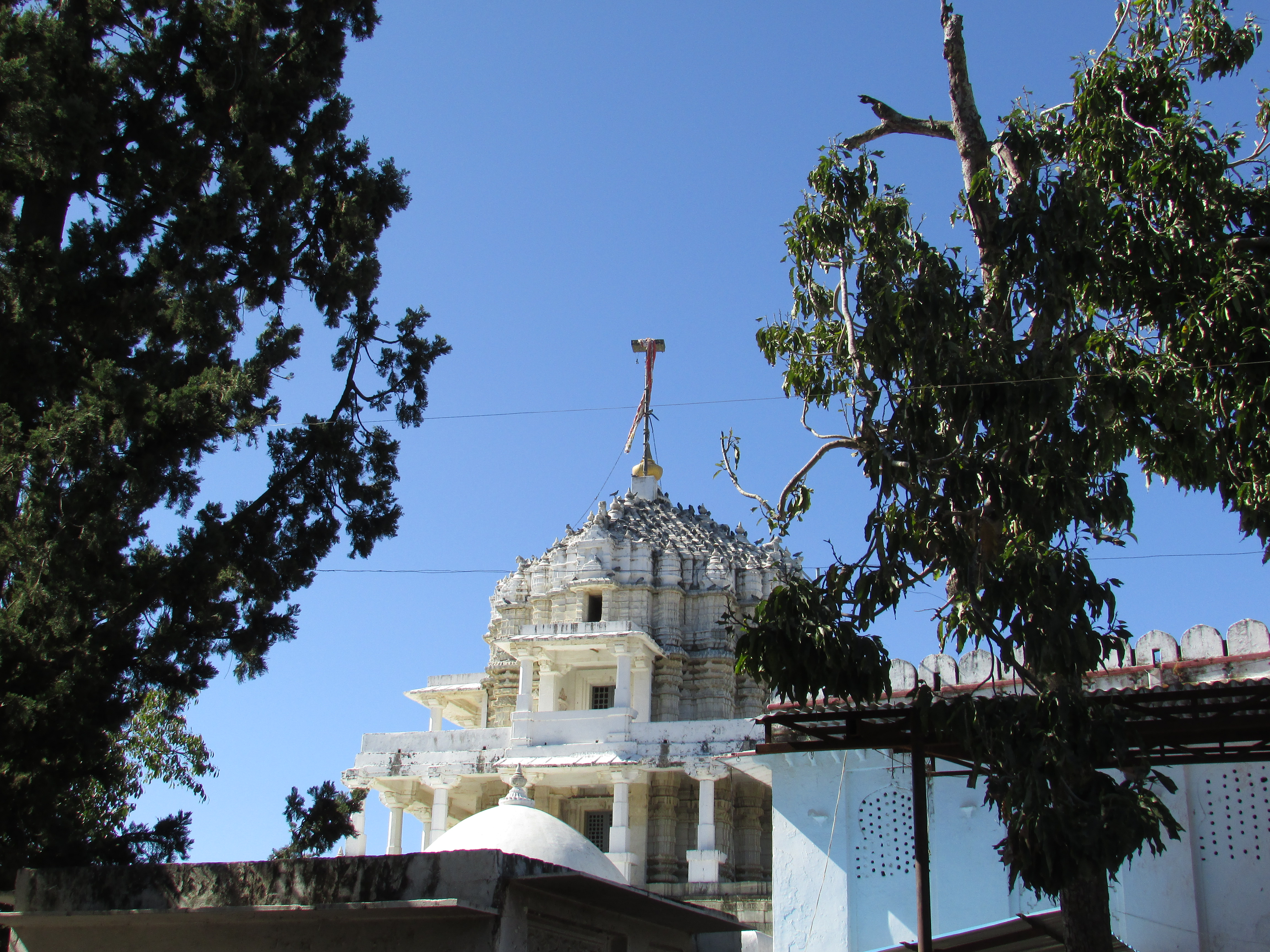
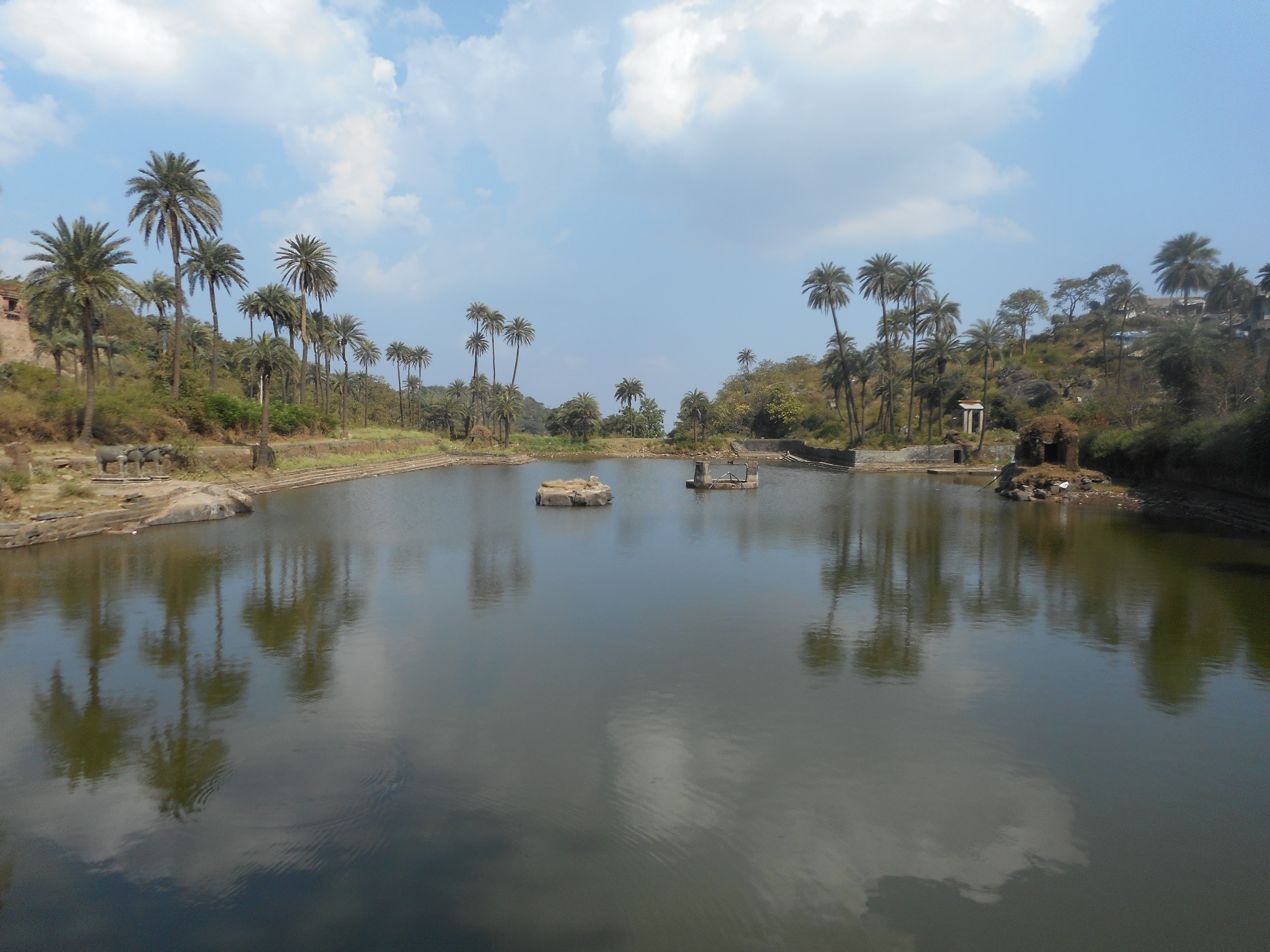
- Top: Dilwara Temple at Mount Abu; Bottom: Lake near Achalgarh Fort

- Location of Sirohi district in Rajasthan
- Country: India
- State: Rajasthan
- Division: Jodhpur
- Headquarters: Sirohi
- Largest city: Abu Road

Area
  - Total: 5,136 km^{2} (1,983 sq mi)

Population (2011)
  - Total: 1,036,346
  - Density: 201.8/km^{2} (522.6/sq mi)
- Time zone: UTC+05:30 (IST)

Sirohi district is a district of Rajasthan state in western India. The town of Sirohi is the district headquarters. Abu Road is the largest city in Sirohi District in terms of area and population.

As of 2011 it is the third least populous district of Rajasthan (out of 33), after Jaisalmer and Pratapgarh.

== History ==
In 1948, Sirohi was taken over by Bombay State from 15 January 1949 to 25 January 1950. Shortly thereafter, on 25 January 1950, the former state was partitioned with Abu Road tehsil and part of Delwara tehsil being joined to Bombay and the remaining portion merging with Rajasthan. At that time an area of 787 km^{2} consisting of Abu Road tehsil and a part of Delwara tehsil was merged with then Bombay state, but it was returned to Sirohi district of Rajasthan State on 1 November 1956.

Sirohi is also called as "Dev Nagari" since ancient times because of many temples and shrines in the district. Sirohi is also famous for manufacturing of double edged Sirohi sword, from the time of the Chauhan Deora rulers (15th century AD) until 1947.

== Geography ==
The district has an area of 5136 km^{2}. It is bordered on the west by Jalor District, on the north by Pali District, on the east by Udaipur District, and on the south by Banaskantha District of Gujarat.

It has an area of 5139 km (2009 sq. miles). Sirohi district is situated at the south-west part of Rajasthan between parallel of 24° 20′ and 25° 17′ North Latitude and 72° 16′ and 73° 10′ East Longitude.

Sirohi District is broken up by hills and rocky ranges. The granite massif of Mount Abu divides the district into two portions, running from north-east to south-west. The south and south-east part of the district, which lies between Mount Abu and the main spine of the Aravallis, is mountainous and rugged, and is drained by the West Banas River. Abu Road, a station on the main Delhi-Ahmedabad rail line, lies in the valley of the West Banas. Dry deciduous forest is common in this part of the district, and the higher elevations of Mount Abu are covered in conifer forests. Abu Road is the biggest city and the main financial hub of Sirohi District. Sirohi district has the fewest villages in Rajasthan.

The portion of the district west and north of Mount Abu is drier, lying in the rain shadow of the mountain, which blocks the southwest monsoon. The southwest corner of the district is drained by the Sukri river, an intermittent stream that drains the western slope of Mount Abu. The northwestern portion of the district is drained by tributaries of the Luni River. The Northwestern thorn scrub forests cover the western and northern portion of the district. Warada is the last village of Sirohi located on Sirohi–Siyana Road.

== Demographics ==
Historical population
Year	Pop.	±% p.a.
1901	162,965	—
1911	189,684	+1.53%
1921	188,781	−0.05%
1931	216,602	+1.38%
1941	235,760	+0.85%
1951	289,791	+2.08%
1961	352,303	+1.97%
1971	423,815	+1.87%
1981	542,049	+2.49%
1991	654,029	+1.90%
2001	851,107	+2.67%
2011	1,036,346	+1.99%

Religions in Sirohi district (2011)
Religion	Percent
Hinduism	96.16%
Islam	2.94%
Jainism	0.66%
Other or not stated	0.24%

According to the 2011 census Sirohi district has a population of 1,036,346, roughly equal to the nation of Cyprus or the US state of Rhode Island. This gives it a ranking of 437rd in India (out of a total of 640). The district has a population density of 202 inhabitants per square kilometre (520/sq mi) . Its population growth rate over the decade 2001-2011 was 21.86%. Sirohi has a sex ratio of 938 females for every 1000 males, and a literacy rate of 56.02%. 20.13% of the population live in urban areas. Scheduled Castes and Scheduled Tribes make up 19.48% and 28.22% of the population respectively.

=== Languages ===
Languages of Sirohi district (2011)
1. Marwari (66.5%)
2. Bhili language (16.4%)
3. Hindi (7.54%)
4. Rajasthani (7.04%)
5. Others (2.51%)

At the time of the 2011 census, 66.47% of the population spoke Marwari, 7.54% Hindi, 7.04% Rajasthani and 16.44% bhili as their first language.

== Economy ==
In 2006 the Ministry of Panchayati Raj named Sirohi one of the country's 250 most backward districts (out of a total of 640). It is one of the twelve districts in Rajasthan currently receiving funds from the Backward Regions Grant Fund Programme (BRGF).

== Administrative setup ==
There are Six Sub Divisions in the Sirohi district: Abu Road, Sirohi, Mount Abu, Sheoganj, Pindwara and Reodar, while Six tehsils are Abu Road, Deldar, Sirohi, Sheoganj, Pindwara, and Reodar. Five of the above tehsils (excluding Deldar) have Panchayat Samitis. A total of 162 Gram Panchayts are there for 518 villages in the district and five Nagar Palikas (Municipalitys) are there for Sirohi, Sheoganj, Pindwara, Abu Road and Mount Abu. There are three sub-tehsils: Bhavri in Pindwara, Kalandri in Sirohi, and Mandar in Reodar tehsils respectively.

== Places of interest ==
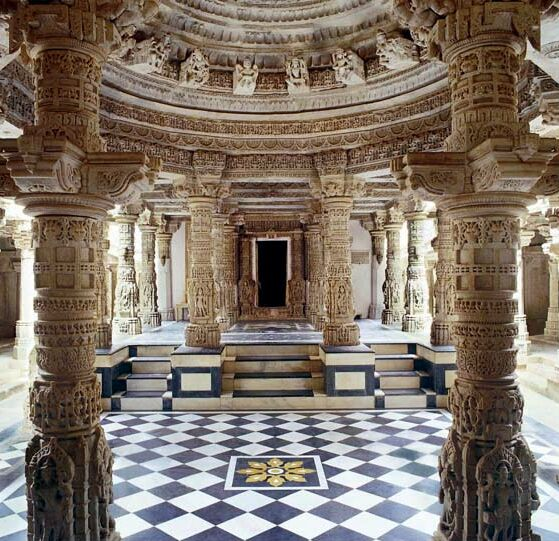
Adishwara temple, Dilwara Temples

- Mount Abu
- Abu Road
- Mungathala temples, near Abu Road city
- Chandravati Temple, Abu Road city (a historical ancient city with remains dating broadly from around the 9th–14th centuries)
- Amarnath Mahadev Temple, Maval, Abu Road (Ancient Shiva temple)
- Sirohi
- Saraneshwar Mahadev Temple (3km from Sirohi town, located on Aravali Hills, on the Ahmedabad -Jaipur National Highway. One of the most Ancient shiva Temple)
- Ambeshawar Mahadev Temple Sirohi (12 km away from Sirohi town, located on Aravali Hills, with 350 steps to reach temple, on Ahmadabad-Jaipur Highway.
- Mirpur Jain Temple (18 km from Sirohi town)
- Shree Pavapuri Tirth Dham
- Jirawala
- Kusuma
