= Sanchore =

Sanchore Satyapur
- City
- Sanchore
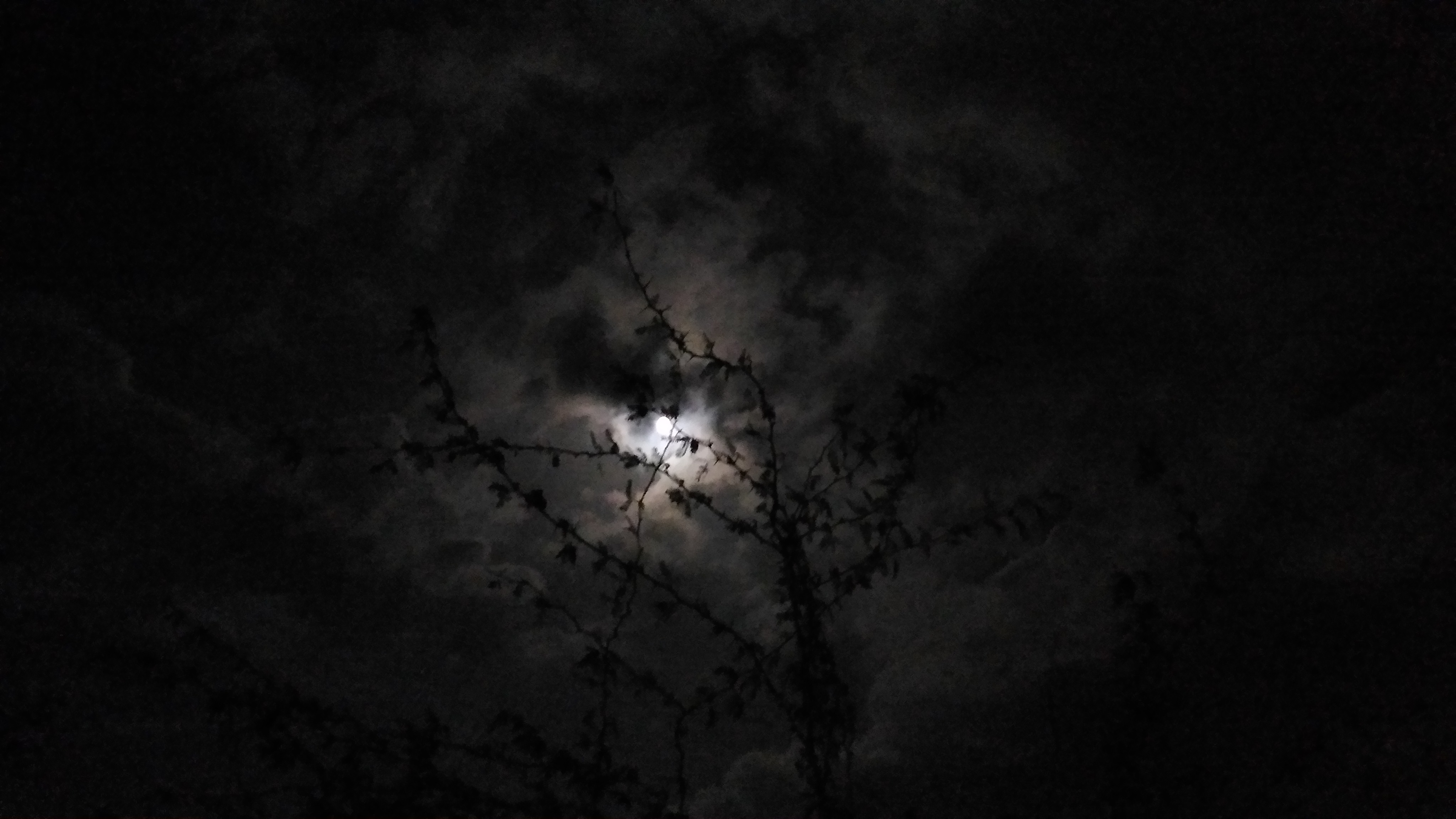

- Location in Rajasthan, India
- Coordinates: 24°45′13″N 71°46′17″E
- Country: India
- State: Rajasthan
- District: Jalore

Government
  - Type: Member of the Rajasthan Legislative Assembly
  - Body: Municipal Council
  - Member of Legislative Assembly: Jivaram Choudhary, (Independent)
- Elevation: 192 m (630 ft)

Population (2011)
  - Total: 32,875
- Time zone: UTC+5:30 (IST)
- PIN: 343041
- Vehicle registration: (RJ46)

Sanchore is a city, which is located, about 135 km from Jalore City in Jalore district in the Indian state of Rajasthan. It serves as headquarters of Sanchore Tehshil. The town is located on National Highway 68 and also on Amritsar–Jamnagar Expressway (NH-754). Sanchore was once known as Satyapur, Muhmdabad.

== Economy ==
As of 2012 many infrastructure projects were in progress in Sanchor. Oil exploration company Cairn Energy, discovered 480,000,000 tonnes (1.06×10^{12} lb) of crude oil in the Barmer-Sanchore basin in 2010. The Narmada Canal, which begins in Gujarat, enters Rajasthan state near the village Silu in Sachore tehsil, after passing through 458 kilometres (285 mi) in Gujarat.

Pathmeda village near Sanchore has Gopal Govardhan Gaushala, the largest Gaushala in India. Spread over 200 acres (0.81 km^{2}), the gaushala takes care of more than 18,000 cattle.

== Demographics ==
As of 2011, Sanchore had a population of 487458 (254057 Males constitute the population and 233401 are females. Males constituted 52.1% of the population. Sanchore has an average literacy rate of 56.18%, lower than the average literacy rate of Rajasthan is 66.11%. Male literacy is 58.77% and female literacy is 32.18%. 15.98 percent of Sanchore's population is under six years of age.

== Transport ==
Road Transport

National Highway 68

Sanchore is a town located in the Jalore district of the Indian state of Rajasthan. It is known for its rich cultural heritage, historical significance, and vibrant local community. The town is situated in the Thar Desert region and has a predominantly arid climate. In terms of transportation, Sanchore is well-connected by road network.

=== Narmada Canal ===
The Narmada Canal in Rajasthan is 74 km (46 mi) long and has nine major distributaries. The main canal, major and secondary distributaries supply an area of 1,477 square kilometres (570 sq mi) serving 124 villages in the Sanchore and Barmer districts.

=== Railways ===
The stations nearest to Sanchore are Raniwara, 47 km (29 mi) on State Highway 11; Dhanera, 42 km (26 mi) on MRD No 108; Bhinmal, 65 km (40 mi) on State Highway No 11.
