= Sumerpur Tehsil =

Sumerpur Tehsil is one of the 10 tehsils in the Pali district of Indian state Rajasthan.

Sumerpur links Pali district from Sirohi district and is an agriculture Mandi. Cotton and Chillis are exported from Sumerpur.

== Geography ==
The Aravalli Range forms the eastern boundary of the tehsil, where the Jawai dam is located.

The tehsil is located in the south-western part of the Pali district. The western portion of the tehsil includes the alluvial plain of the Luni. It is bounded by Pali tehsil to the north, Bali tehsil to the east, Jalore district (Ahore tehsil) to the west and Sirohi district (Sheoganj tehsil) to the south.

The tehsil has an area of about 959.73 square kilometers.

== Demographics ==
Population of the tehsil is 1,85,290 (2001 census). Out of which 137,999 is rural while 47,291 is urban. Male constitutes 93,729 and female population is 91,561.

== Administration ==
There are 67 villages in the tehsil under 29 Gram Panchayats. The Gram Panchayats of the tehsil are Arenpura, Bamnera, Bharunda, Palri, Korta, Pomawa, Koliwara, Netara, Bankali, Khiwandi, Nowi, Sindroo, Balupura, Dujana, Balana, Sanderao, Gogra, Koselao, Kheemara, Pava, Basant, Dhana, Beerami, Deotara, Lapod, Dhola Jagir, Anoppura, Salodriya and Chanod.

Takhatgarh and Sumerpur itself are municipalities in the tehsil.

Sumerpur Tehsil has a Panchayat Samiti, as well as being the Sub-district Office with the same name. the Sumerpur legislative assembly constituency is constituted of Sumerpur Tehsil and part of the Pali Tehsil. Present MLA of the Sumerpur is Joraram Kumawat.

Jawai Dam is situated at about 10 km from the Sumerpur.

== Details ==
- Area (km^{2}) 959.30
- Total Cultivated Area(Hect.): 17239
- Gram Panchyat : 29
- Patwar Circle : 38
- Villages : 67
- Police Circle : 1 (Sumerpur)
- Police Thana : 3 (Sumerpur, Takhatgarh and Sanderao)
- Police Check Post : 4
- Post Office : 6
- LiveStock (1997) : 229031
- Community Health Center :4 (Sumerpur, Takhatgarh, Koselao and Sanderao)
- Primary Health Center : 7
- Ayurvedic Dispensaries :11

== See also ==
- Sumerpur (Rajasthan Assembly constituency)
