= Guda Balotan =

- Village
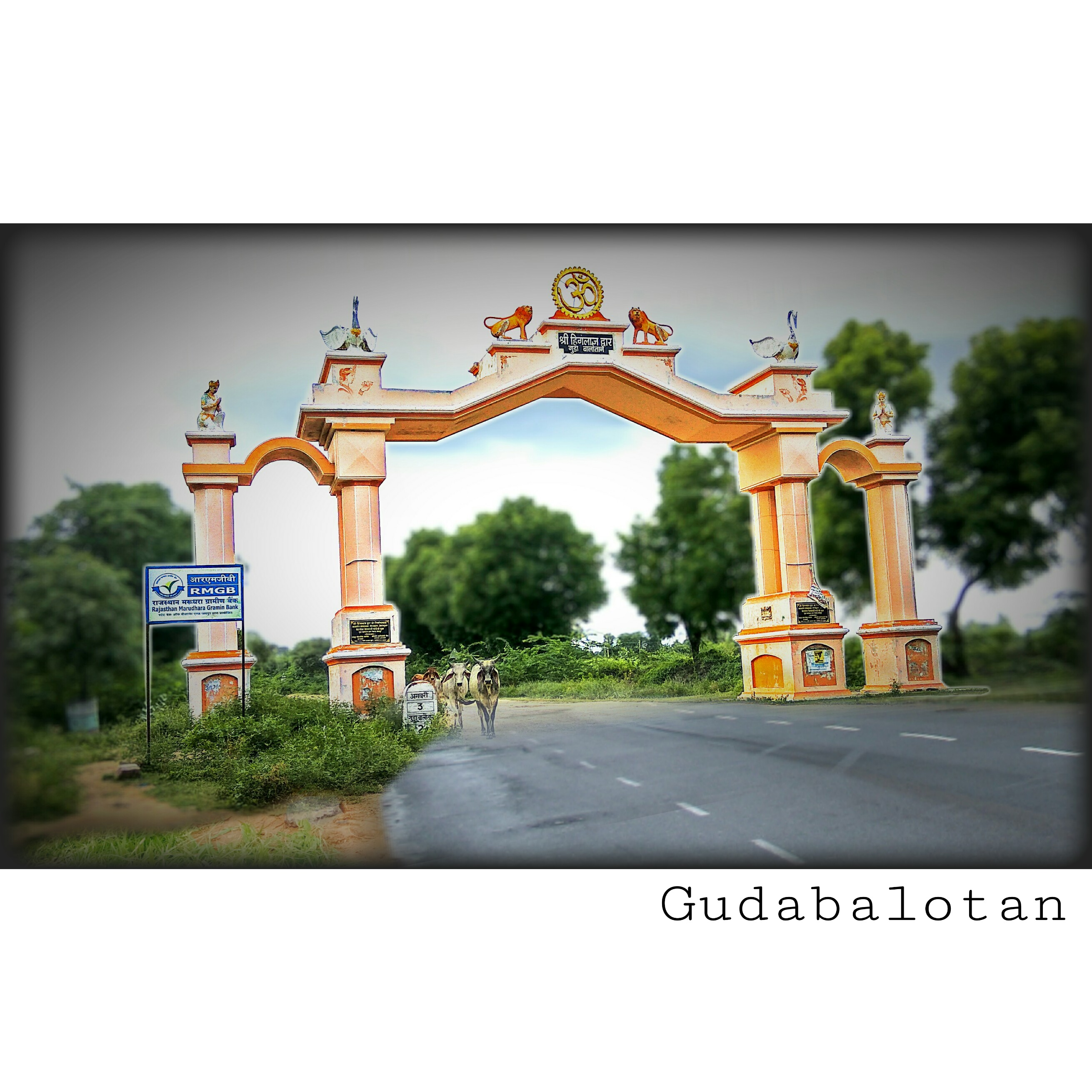
- Guda Balotan

- Location in Rajasthan, India Guda Balotan (India)
- Coordinates: 25.34°N 72.60°E
- Country: India
- State: Rajasthan
- District: Jalore

Population (2011)
  - Total: 5,060

Languages
  - Official: Hindi
- Time zone: UTC+5:30 (IST)
- PIN: 307030
- Telephone code: +912978
- ISO 3166 code: RJ-IN
- Vehicle registration: RJ-16
- Sex ratio: 967 ♂/♀

Guda Balotan is a village in Ahore tehsil of Jalore District of Rajasthan state in India. It is situated on Jalore-Sanderao road (SH-16). Jawai River separates Guda Balotan and Thanwala.

The nearest railway stations are Jalore and Falna. Ahore is within 30 minutes' travel, and Gangavas 2 km away.

== Demographics ==
The Gura Balotan village has population of 5060 of which 2572 are males while 2488 are females as per Population Census 2011.
