= Kotra (disambiguation) =

Kotra may refer to:

- KOTRA, a Korean trade promotion organization

== Places ==
In India:

- Kotra tehsil, a tehsil in Udaipur district, Rajasthan state
- Kotra, Uttar Pradesh, a town in Jalaun district, Uttar Pradesh state
- Kotra, Berasia tehsil, Bhopal, a village in Madhya Pradesh
- Kotra, Huzur tehsil, Bhopal, a village in Madhya Pradesh

Elsewhere:

- Kotra, Pakistan, a city in Pakistan
- Kotra River, a river in Belarus and Lithuania

== See also ==
- Kotra Pitha, a former princely state on Saurashtra peninsula in Gujarat
