= Ummaidpur =

- Village
- Location in Rajasthan, India Ummaidpur (India)
- Coordinates: 25.3167°N 72.9167°E
- Country: India
- State: Rajasthan
- District: Jalor
- Elevation: 208 m (682 ft)

Population (2001)
  - Total: 1,532

Languages
  - Official: Hindi
- Time zone: UTC+5:30 (IST)
- PIN: 307030
- Telephone code: +912978
- Vehicle registration: RJ-16
- Sex ratio: 796 ♂/♀

Umedpur is a village in the Ahore tehsil of Jalore District of Rajasthan state in India. It is situated on the Jalore-Sanderao road (SH-16).

== Demographics ==
Population of Ummaidpur is 1,532 according to census 2001. Where male population is 853 and the female population is 679.
