= Takhatgarh =

- Town
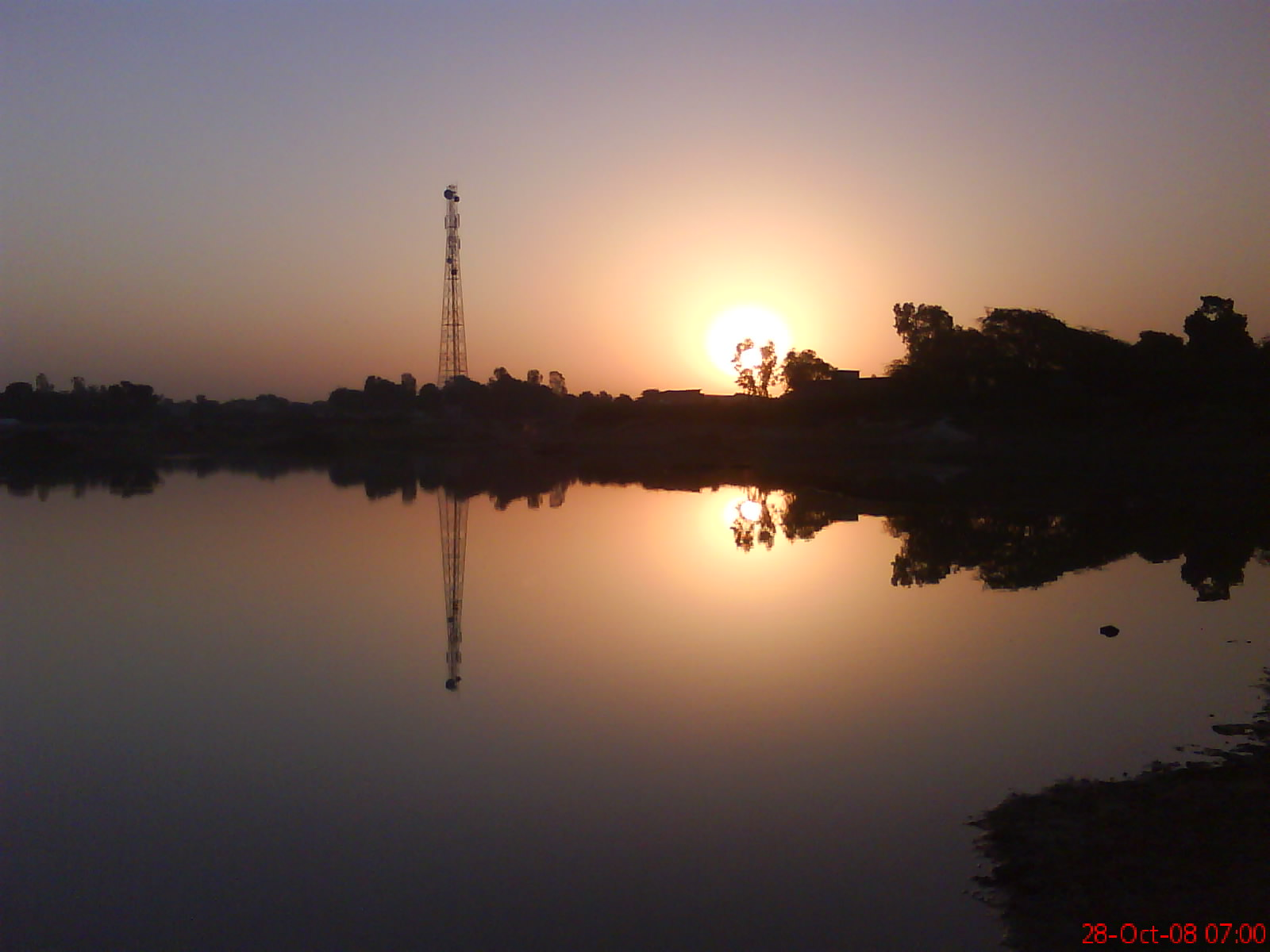
- Sunrise at Takhatgarh Talab

- Location in Rajasthan, India Takhatgarh (India)
- Coordinates: 25.33°N 73.0°E
- Country: India
- State: Rajasthan
- District: Pali
- Subdivision: Sumerpur
- Taluka: Takhatgarh

Government
  - Body: Takhatgarh Municipality

Area
  - Total: 24 km^{2} (9.3 sq mi)
- Elevation: 221 m (725 ft)

Population (2011)
  - Total: 16,729
  - Density: 697/km^{2} (1,810/sq mi)

Languages
  - Official: Hindi, Marwari
- Time zone: UTC+5:30 (IST)
- PIN: 306912
- Telephone code: 02933
- ISO 3166 code: RJ-IN
- Vehicle registration: RJ-22
- Sex ratio: 948 ♂/♀
- Literacy: 58%
- Lok Sabha constituency: Pali (Lok Sabha Constituency)
- Vidhan Sabha constituency: Sumerpur
- Civic agency: Takhatgarh Municipality
- Avg. annual temperature: 28 °C (82 °F)
- Avg. summer temperature: 38 °C (100 °F)
- Avg. winter temperature: 18 °C (64 °F)

Takhatgarh is a town in Pali District of Rajasthan state in India. The town is one of the nine municipalities in the district, located near the district border. This town is Up-tehsil headquarter also since 2023.

== Geography ==
Takhatgarh is located at 25.33°N 73.0°E. It has an average elevation of 221 metres (725 feet) Area of Takhatgarh is 24 km^{2}.

It is located near the Jalore district border. It lies on Jalore-Sanderao road NH325(old SH-16). Takhatgarh map can be seen on Google Maps.

== Economy ==
In 1961–62, the highest per capita income was recorded at Rs. 17.86 per capita in Takhatgarh Panchayat.

== Administration ==
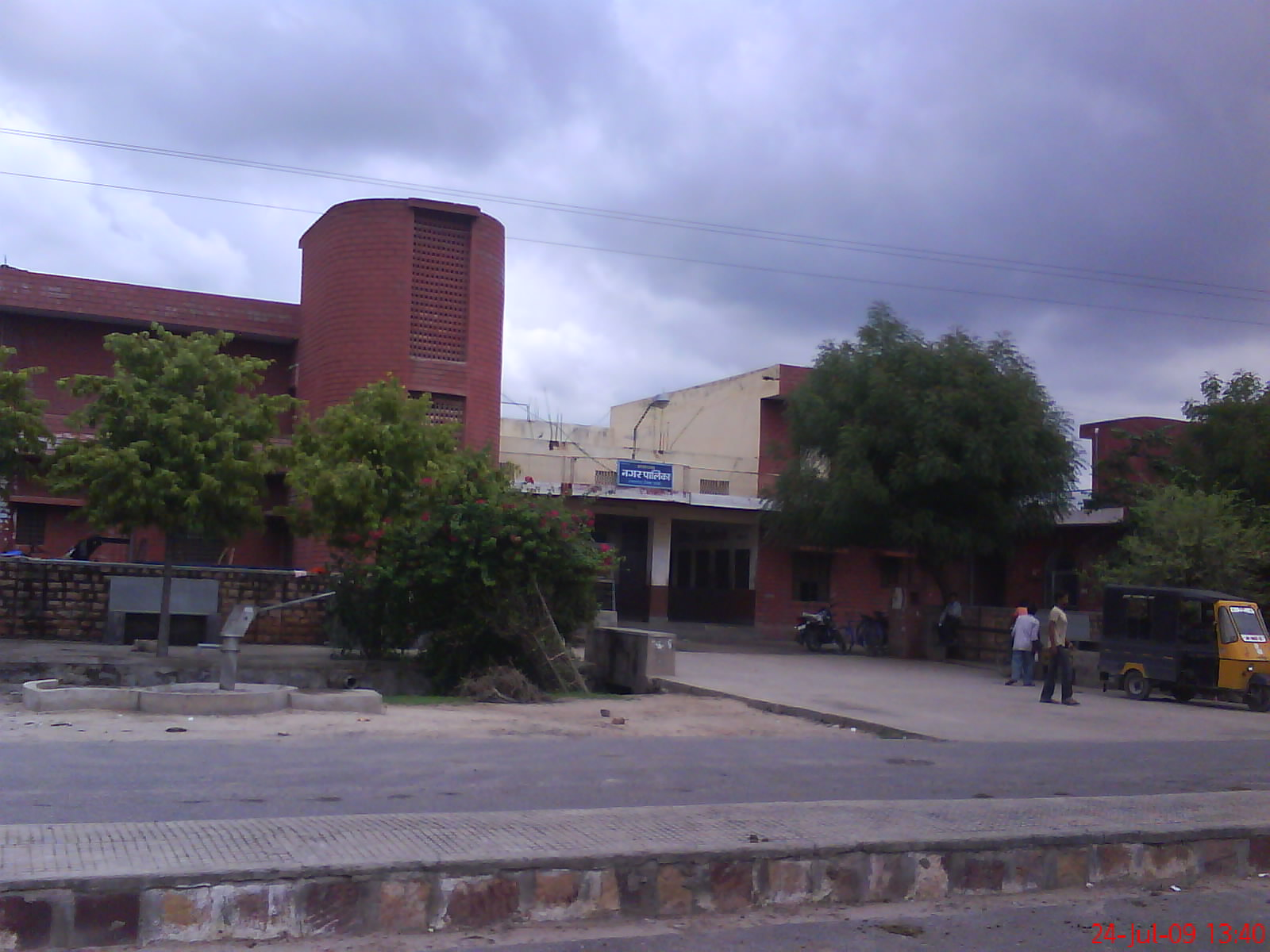
Takhatgarh bus stand and Nagar Palika Office

Takhatgarh comes under Sumerpur tehsil of Pali district in Rajasthan state. It is represented in the center under Pali (Lok Sabha constituency), while in state it is represented under the Sumerpur (Rajasthan Assembly constituency). First Sarpanch of the village was Saremal Kesarimal Sanghavi. It is a municipality of class IV since 1974. Takhatgarh was considered as town in 1951, but in the 1961, as definition of the town is changed, so it is made again rural during 1961 to 1974. Shri Banshilal Baldiya was first municipality chairman.

== Demographics ==
As of 2011 India census, Takhatgarh had a population of 16,729. Males constitute 51% of the population and females 49%. Density per km^{2} is 678. Growth rate of population from 1991 to 2001 is 28.48% and 2001 to 2011 is 5.8% . Takhatgarh has an average literacy rate of 97%, lower than the national average of 99%: male literacy is 97%, and female literacy is 97%. In Takhatgarh, 14% of the population is under 6 years of age.

Historical population
| Year | Pop. | ±% |
|---|---|---|
| 1951 | 5,256 | — |
| 1981 | 11,106 | +111.3% |
| 1991 | 12,305 | +10.8% |
| 2001 | 15,809 | +28.5% |
| 2011 | 16,729 | +5.8% |
Data is based on Government of India Census. Source: [World Gazetteer:Pali]

== Photo gallery ==
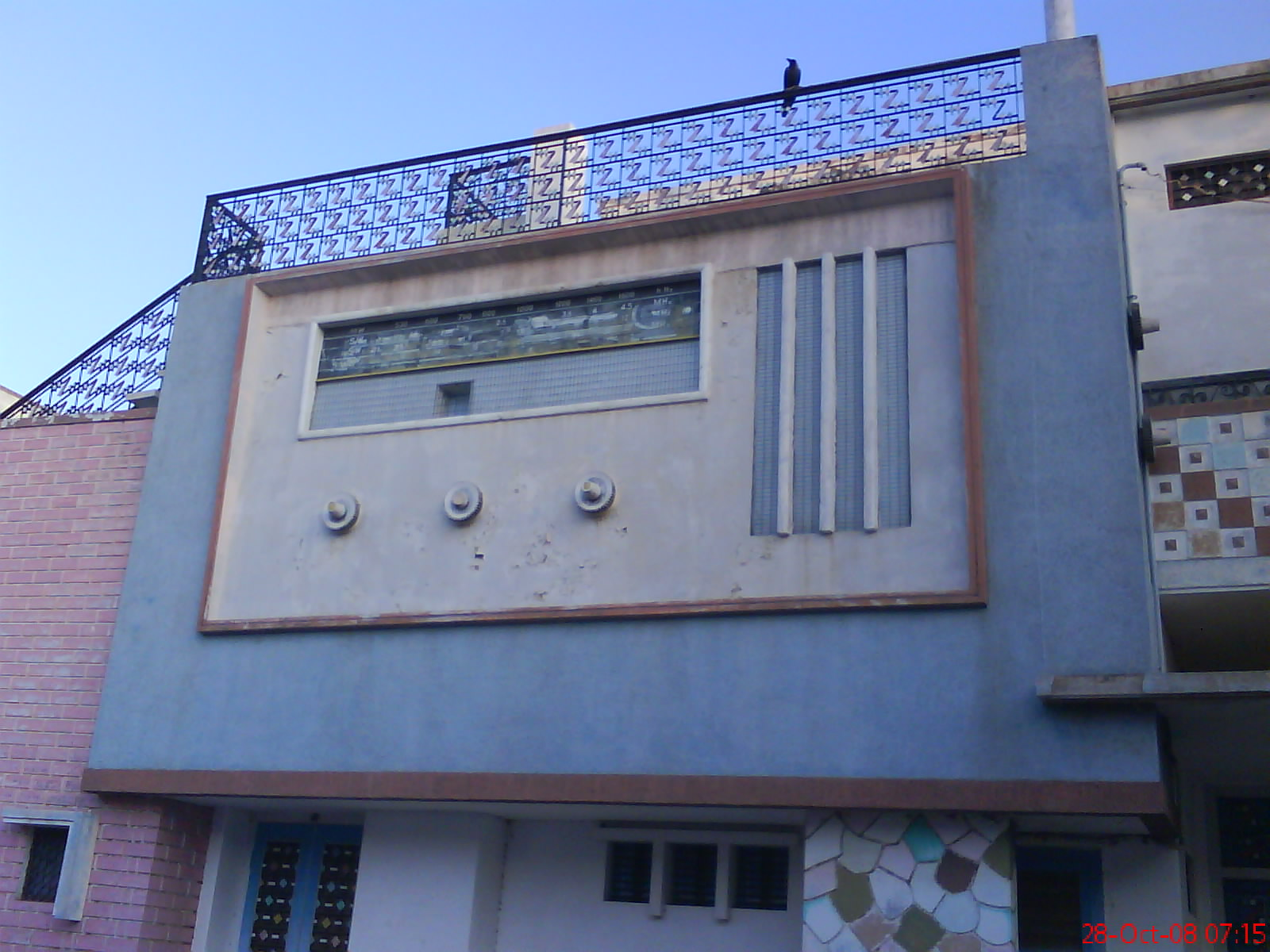
Radio design in a building, Takhatgarh, Pali district, Rajasthan

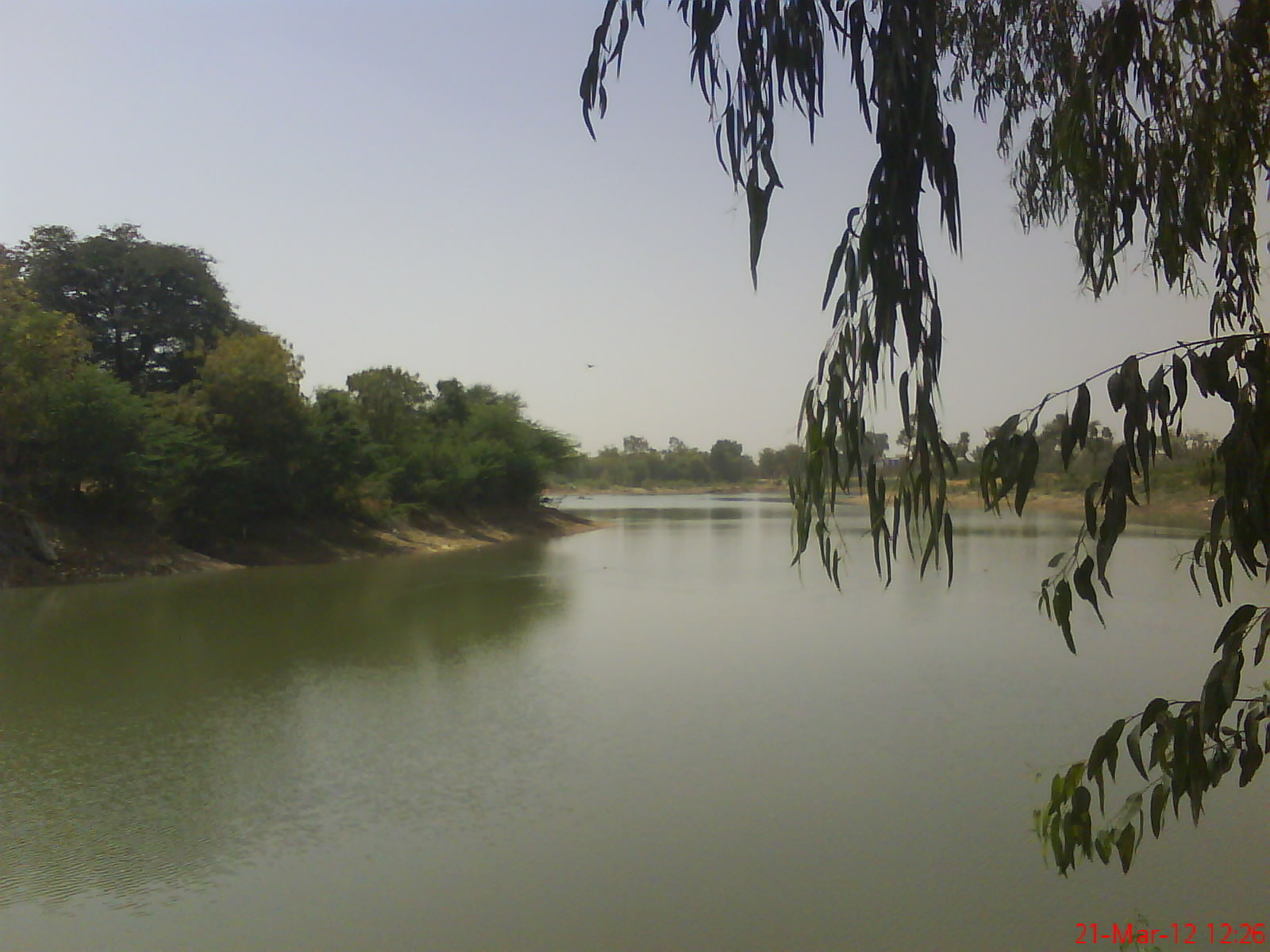
Talab, Takhatgarh, Pali district, Rajasthan

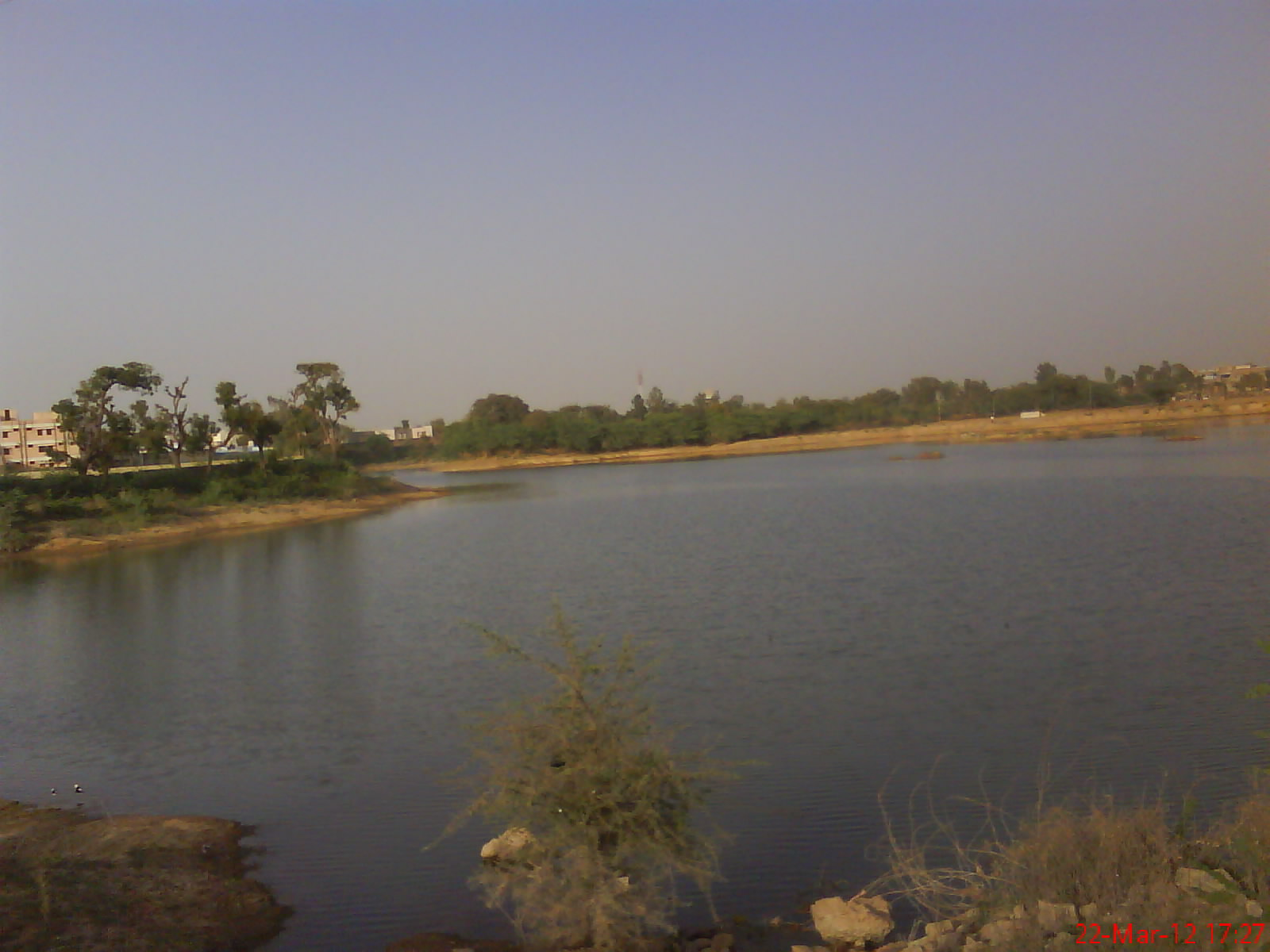
Talab, Takhatgarh, Pali district, Rajasthan

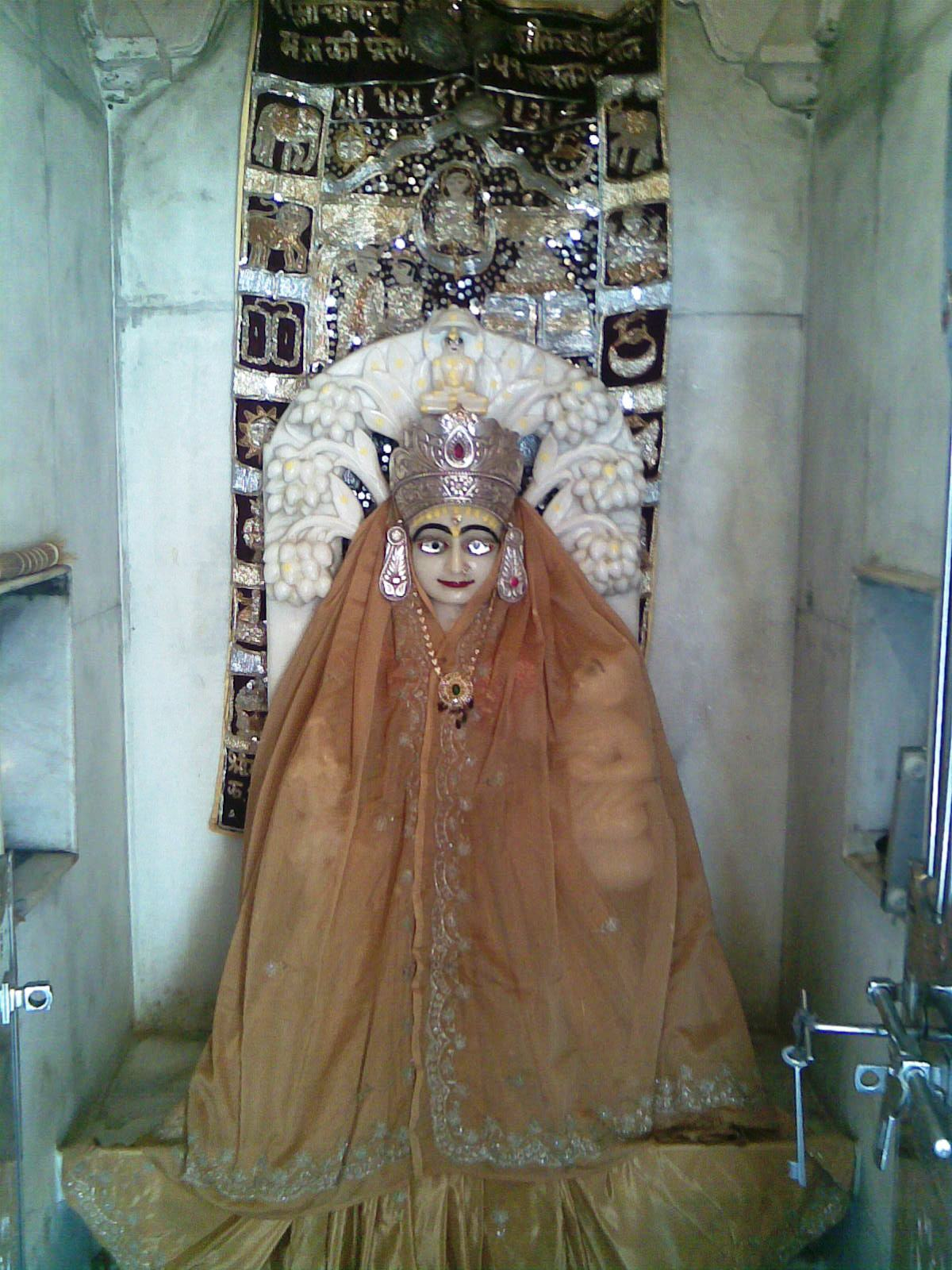
Shri Ambika Devi, Takhatgarh, Pali district, Rajasthan

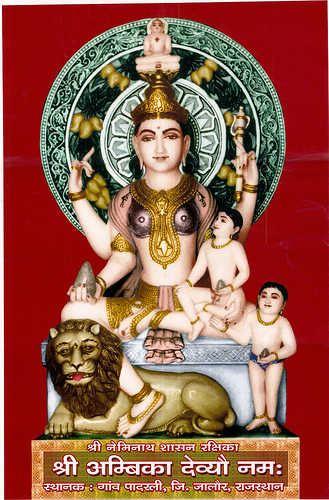
Shri Ambikadevi, Padarli, Jalore district, Rajasthan
