= Agwari =

Agwari may refer to:

- Agwari, Jalore, village in Jalore district, Rajasthan, India
- Agwari, Sikar, village in Sikar district, Rajasthan, India
