= Chandrai =

Chandrai chandrai
- village
- Location in Rajasthan, India Chandrai (India)
- Coordinates: 25.4555°N 72.9500°E
- Country: India
- State: Rajasthan
- District: Jalor
- Elevation: 189 m (620 ft)

Population (2001)
  - Total: 3,249

Languages
  - Official: Hindi
- Time zone: UTC+5:30 (IST)
- PIN: 307030
- Telephone code: +912978
- Vehicle registration: RJ-16
- Sex ratio: 1010 ♂/♀

Chandrai is a village in Ahore tehsil of Jalore District of the Indian state of Rajasthan.

== Geography ==
Chandrai is located at 25.45°N 72.95°E.

== Demographics ==
The population of Chandrai was 3,249 according to the census of 2001: 1,616 males and 1,633 females.
