= State Highway 16 (Rajasthan) =

Road in Rajasthan, India

State Highway 16

Route information
- Length: 276 km (171 mi)

Major junctions
- West end: Chawa, Rajasthan
- East end: Amritia, Rajasthan

Location
- Country: India
- State: Rajasthan
- Districts: Rajasthan: Barmer district, Jalore district, Pali district and Rajsamand district
- Primary destinations: Sindhari, Jalore, Takhatgarh, Sanderao, Sadri, Desuri

Highway system
- Roads in India; Expressways; National; State; Asian; State Highways in Rajasthan

State Highway 16 ( RJ SH 16) is a State Highway in the Rajasthan state of India that connects Chawa in the Barmer district of Rajasthan with Amritia in the Rajsamand district of Rajasthan. The total length of RJ SH 16 is 276 km.

This highway connects National Highway 112 in Chawa to National Highway 8 in Amartiya. Other cities and towns on this highway are: Sindhari, Jalore, Ahore, Takhatgarh, Sanderao, Falna, Bali, Sadri, Desuri and Garbor.

The Jalore to Sanderao section of the road is being converted into National Highway 325 (India).

== See also ==
- List of state highways in Rajasthan
- Roads in Pali district
