= Koselao =

Rural Town in Rajasthan, India

- Rural
- Interactive map of Koselao
- Coordinates: 25.38°N 73.12°E
- Country: India
- State: Rajasthan
- District: Pali

Government
  - Body: Gram Panchayat
- Elevation: 239 m (784 ft)

Population (2011)
  - Total: 7,561

Languages
  - Official: Godwadi
- Time zone: UTC+5:30 (IST)
- PIN: 306708
- Telephone code: 02938
- Vehicle registration: RJ-22
- Sex ratio: 970 ♂/♀

Koselao is a village in the Sumerpur tehsil of Pali district in the Indian state of Rajasthan. It is located near Sanderao.

There are many temples, including Chamunda Mataji Temple situated on Lambiya Bhakri, Baba Ramdev Ji Temple at Baba Gaon Road, and Shani Dev Temple at Shaneshwar Chauk. There are also Jain temples in Koselao, despite recent Jain emigration from the town. People here prominently speak Godwari, a dialect of the Rajsthani language. There are many Rajputs, such as Deoras, Pratihar, and other clans. It is a prominent village in the area.

== Geography ==
Koselao is at 25.38°N 73.12°E. It has an average elevation of 239 metres (787 feet). There is one pond in the village.

== Demographics ==
As of 2001 India census, Koselao had a population of 10,227. Males constituted 51% of the population and females 49%.
