= Erinpura (disambiguation) =

Erinpura may refer to:

- Erinpura, a village in the Sirohi district of Rajasthan, India
- Arenpura, a village in the Pali district of Rajasthan, India
- SS Erinpura, a ship of the British-India Steam Navigation Company
- Erinpura Granite: a type of Granite
- 43rd Erinpura Regiment, regiment of the British Indian Army
