= Babulal Kharadi =

Indian politician

Cabinet Minister, Government of Rajasthan
- Incumbent
- Assumed office 30 December 2023
- Governor: Kalraj Mishra; Haribhau Bagade
- Chief Minister: Bhajan Lal Sharma
- Ministry and Departments: List: * Tribal Regional Development; * Home Defense
- Preceded by: Arjun Singh Bamniya

Member of the Rajasthan Legislative Assembly
- Incumbent
- Assumed office 2018
- Preceded by: Heeralal Darangi
- Constituency: Jhadol
- In office 2008–2013
- Succeeded by: Heeralal Darangi
- Constituency: Jhadol
- In office 2003–2008
- Preceded by: Kuber Singh
- Constituency: Phalasia

Pradhan, Panchayat Samiti Kotra
- In office 2000–2003

Personal details
- Born: 15 August 1967 (age 59) Nichlathala, Kotda, Udaipur, Rajasthan
- Party: Bharatiya Janata Party
- Spouse(s): Mani Devi and Tej Devi
- Children: 8
- Parent(s): Phagana Kharadi (father); Harki Devi (mother)
- Occupation: Politician
- Profession: Agriculture

Babulal Kharadi (born 15 August 1967) is an Indian politician from Rajasthan. He is serving as a Cabinet Minister in the Government of Rajasthan, overseeing the Tribal Regional Development and Home Defense departments in the Bhajan Lal Sharma ministry. He is a member of the Rajasthan Legislative Assembly representing the Jhadol Assembly constituency as a member of the Bharatiya Janata Party.

== Political career ==
Kharadi began his political career with the Bharatiya Janata Party youth wing in the late 1980s. He contested his first election in 1995 for the Zila Parishad and was elected as the Pradhan of Panchayat Samiti Kotra in 2000.

In 2003, he was elected to the Rajasthan Legislative Assembly from the Phalasia constituency. He subsequently represented the restructured Jhadol constituency in 2008, 2018, and 2023. He lost the 2013 election but returned in the next term.

He was appointed a Cabinet Minister on 30 December 2023.

In 2021, he received the "Best Legislator" award from the Rajasthan Legislative Assembly for his contributions in the House.

== Electoral record ==
Election results
Year	Office	Constituency	Candidate (Party)	Votes	%	Opponent (Party)	Opponent Votes	Opponent %	Result	Ref
2023	MLA	Jhadol	Babulal Kharadi (BJP)	76,537	34.99	Heera Lal Darangi (INC)	70,049	32.02	Won	TOI
2018	MLA	Jhadol	Babulal Kharadi (BJP)	87,527	44.52	Sunil Kumar Bhajat (INC)	74,580	37.93	Won	TOI
2013	MLA	Jhadol	Babulal Kharadi (BJP)	62,670	39.20	Heeralal Darangi (INC)	67,354	42.13	Lost	TOI
2008	MLA	Jhadol	Babulal Kharadi (BJP)	46,654	37.37	Heeralal Darangi (INC)	39,335	31.51	Won	
2003	MLA	Phalasia	Babulal Kharadi (BJP)	37,671	37.8	Kuber Singh (INC)	26,192	26.3	Won	
1998	MLA	Phalasia	Babulal Kharadi (BJP)	23,920	32.18	Kuber Singh (INC)	33,651	45.27	Lost	
