= Sei Dam =

Dam in Rajasthan, India

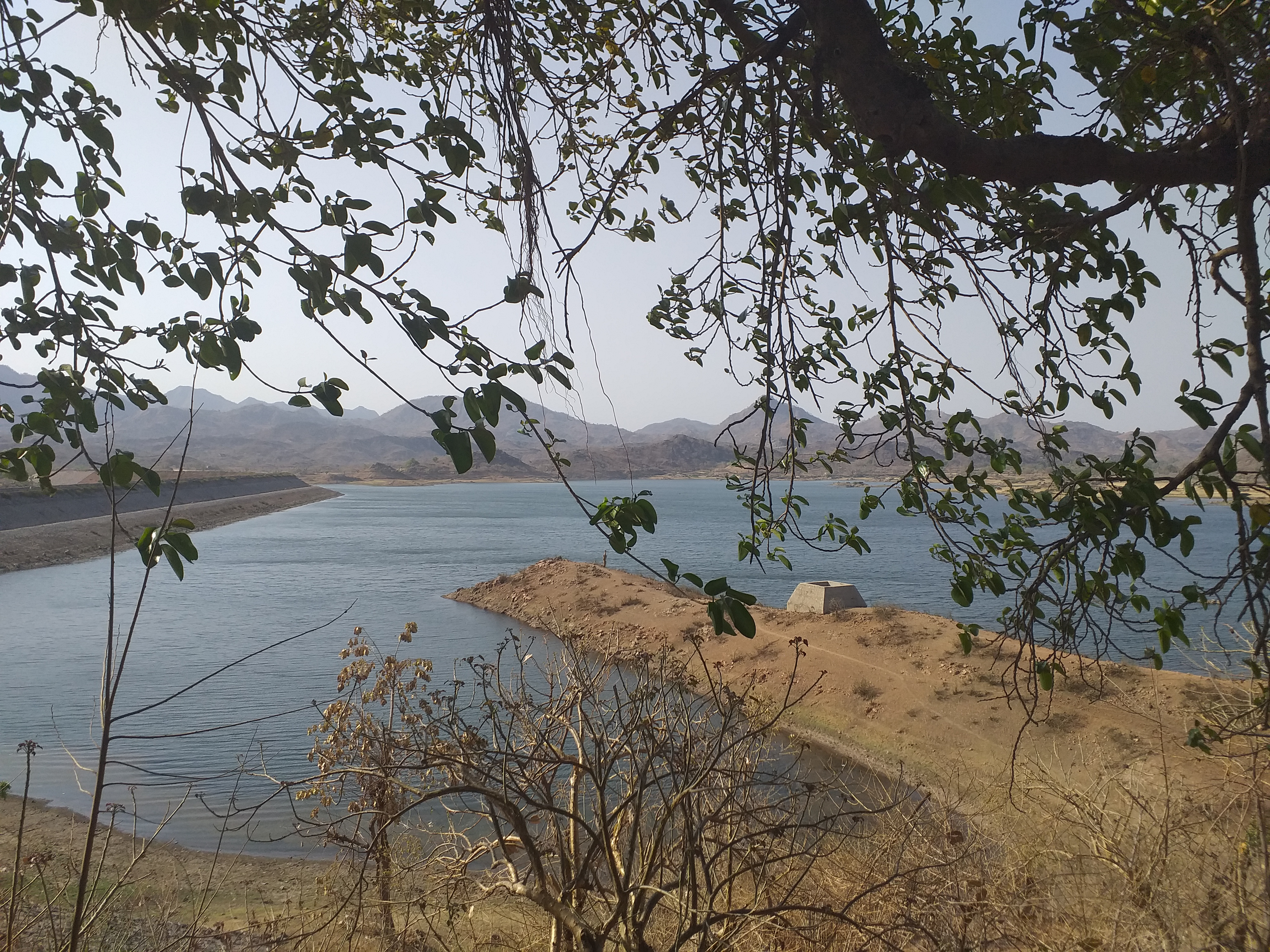
- View of reservoir of Sei Dam
- Interactive map of Sei Dam
- Location: Kotra tehsil, Udaipur district, Rajasthan
- Coordinates: 24.719217°N 73.198075°E
- Construction began: 1968-69
- Operator: Government of Rajasthan

Dam and spillways
- Impounds: Sei River
- Height: 28 m
- Length: 1453 m
- Spillway capacity: 1756 cubic metres per second

Reservoir
- Total capacity: 31.33 million cubic metres

Sei Dam (also known as the Sei Diversion Dam) is an earthen gravity dam on the Sei River, a tributary of Sabarmati River, in Kotra tehsil in Udaipur district of Rajasthan, India. The primary purpose of the dam is to store water to be diverted to the Jawai Dam on the Jawai River in Pali district.

The catchment area of the Sei River at the dam site is 320 square kilometres. Construction of the Sei Dam was started in 1977 and completed in 1978 at the cost of Rs. 4.07 crores.

Seri Dam is around 90 km by road from Udaipur City on the Udaipur-Pindwara Road.
