= Agwari, Jalore =

Agwari
- Village
- Location in Rajasthan, India Agwari (India)
- Coordinates: 25.3279°N 72.8737°E
- Country: India
- State: Rajasthan
- District: Jalore
- Tehsil: Ahore

Population (2011)
  - Total: 3,833
- Time zone: UTC+5:30 (IST)
- PIN: 307030

Agwari is a village in Ahore tehsil of Jalore district of Rajasthan State in India. The village is situated 14 km east of the Ahore beside 2 km of NH 325. Jawai River separates Agwari and Kuada. The nearest Railway Station is Jalore and Falna. Gangavas is 4 km away. The PIN code is 307030. Agwari village has population of 3833 of which 1830 are males while 2003 are females as per Population Census 2011.
