= Kaniwara =

Kaniwara कानीवाड़ा
- Village
- Kaniwara
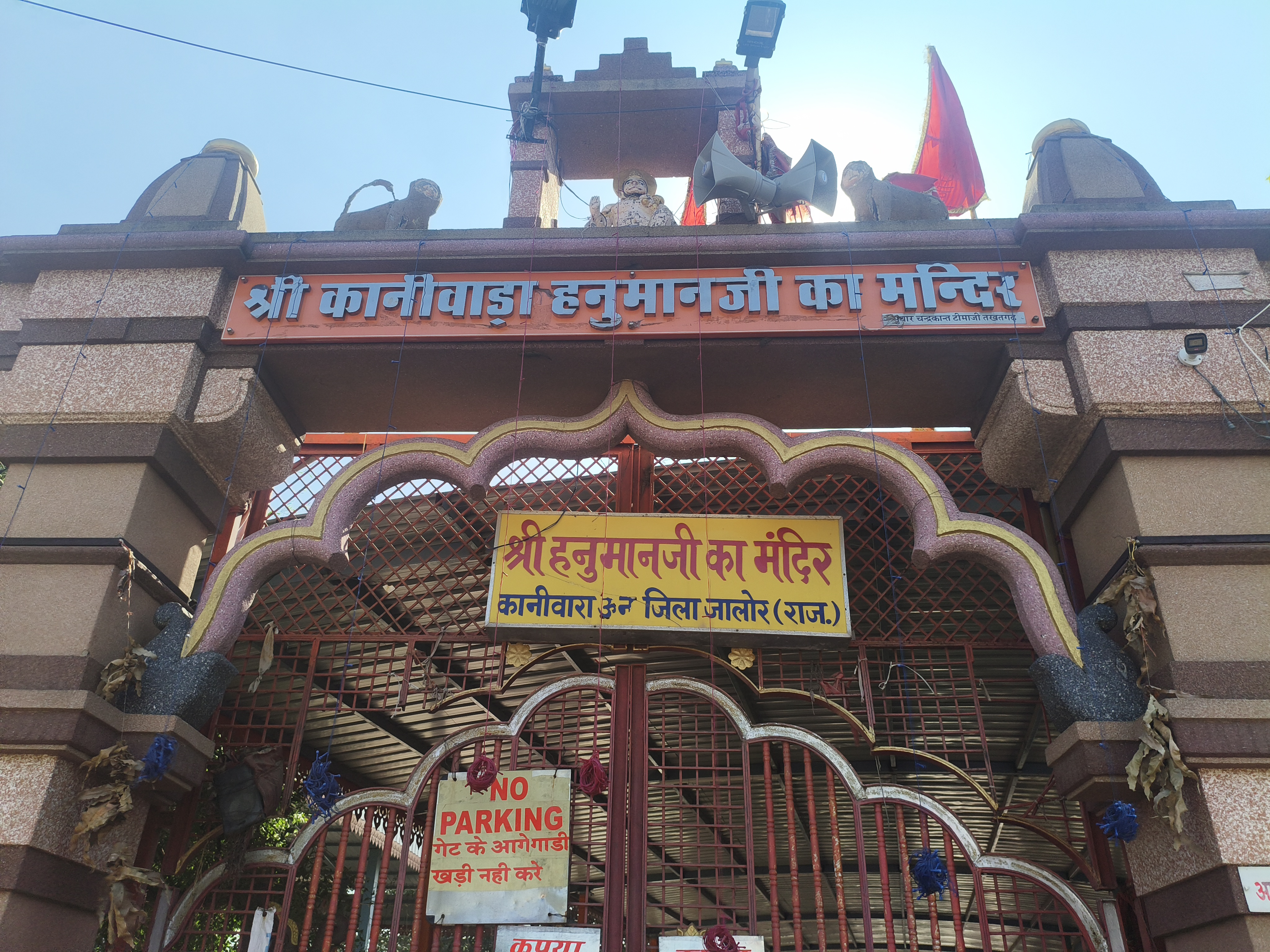
- Kaniwada Hanuman Templefamous for its historic and uniqueness

- Location in Rajasthan, India Kaniwara (India) Kaniwara (India)
- Coordinates: 25.5635748°N 72.6562804°E
- State: Rajasthan
- District: Jalor
- Established: 16th Century

Government
  - Type: grampanchayat
  - Body: Panchayati raj (India)
- Elevation: 162 m (531 ft)

Languages
  - Official: Hindi, Marwari
- ISO 3166 code: RJ-IN
- Vehicle registration: RJ-16
- Sex ratio: 938♂/♀

Kaniwarais village located in the Ahore tehsil of the Jalore district of Rajasthan state, India.known for its historic and unique Kaniwada Hanuman Temple.

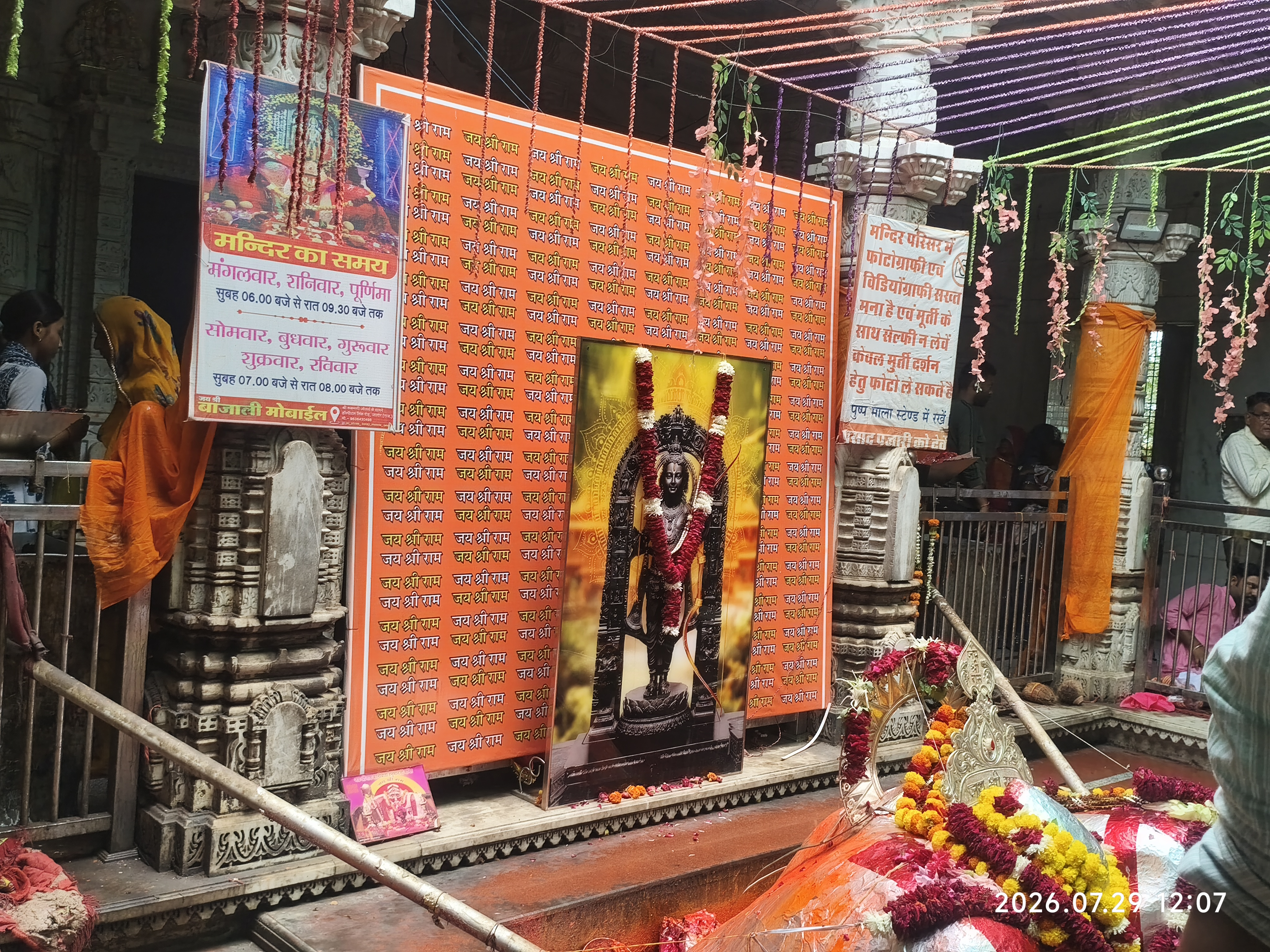
Kaniwada

== Demographics ==
According to local census data, the village is a medium-sized settlement made up of approximately 160 households. It is primarily a close-knit agricultural community.
