= Jhadol Assembly constituency =

Legislative Assembly constituency in Rajasthan State, India

Coordinates: 24.36°N 73.53°E

Jhadol
- Constituency No. 150 for the Rajasthan Legislative Assembly

Constituency details
- Country: India
- Region: North India
- State: Rajasthan
- District: Udaipur
- Lok Sabha constituency: [[Udaipur ( Lok Sabha constituency) |Udaipur]]
- Total electors: 273,497
- Reservation: ST

Member of Legislative Assembly
- 16th Rajasthan Legislative Assembly
- Incumbent Babulal Kharadi
- Party: Bharatiya Janata Party

Jhadol Assembly constituency is one of the 200 Legislative Assembly constituencies of Rajasthan state in India. It comprises Jhadol tehsil and parts of Kotra tehsil, both in Udaipur district, and is reserved for candidates belonging to the Scheduled Tribes. As of 2023, it is represented by Babulal Kharadi of the Bharatiya Janata Party.

== Members of the Legislative Assembly ==
Election	Name	Party
2008	Babulal Kharadi	Bharatiya Janata Party
2013	Heeralal	Indian National Congress
2018	Babulal Kharadi	Bharatiya Janata Party
2023	Babulal Kharadi	Bharatiya Janata Party

== Election results ==
=== 2023 ===
2023 Rajasthan Legislative Assembly election: Jhadol
Party	Candidate	Votes	%	±%
BJP	Babulal Kharadi	76,537	34.99	−9.53
INC	Heeralal Darangi	70,049	32.02	−5.91
BAP	Dinesh Pandor	44,503	20.34	
CPI(M)	Prem Chand Pargi	4,539	2.08	−3.26
BTP	Dev Vijay	4,204	1.92	
BSP	Nima Lal	4,126	1.89	−1.04
Independent	Shanti Lal	3,758	1.72	
Independent	Laduram	2,425	1.11	
Independent	Prachi Meena	2,117	0.97	
NOTA	None of the above	6,488	2.97	−0.82
Majority		6,488	2.97	−3.62
Turnout		218,746	79.98	−0.31
BJP hold		Swing		

=== 2018 ===
2018 Rajasthan Legislative Assembly election: Jhadol
Party	Candidate	Votes	%	±%
BJP	Babulal Kharadi	87,527	44.52	
INC	Sunil Kumar Bhajat	74,580	37.93	
CPI(M)	Shankar Lal Pargi	10,498	5.34	
Independent	Sohan Lal	6,209	3.16	
BSP	Nima Lal	5,757	2.93	
AAP	Laduram	4,584	2.33	
NOTA	None of the above	7,457	3.79	
Majority		12,947	6.59	
Turnout		196,612	80.29	
BJP gain from INC		Swing		

== See also ==
- List of constituencies of the Rajasthan Legislative Assembly
- Udaipur district
