= Arenpura, Rajasthan =

Arenpura
- rural
- Country: India
- State: Rajasthan
- District: Pali
- Tehsil: Sumerpur

Languages
  - Official: Hindi, Marwari
- Time zone: UTC+5:30 (IST)
- Telephone code: 02933
- ISO 3166 code: RJ-IN
- Vehicle registration: RJ-22
- Lok Sabha constituency: Pali (Lok Sabha Constituency)
- Vidhan Sabha constituency: Sumerpur
- Avg. annual temperature: 22.5 °C (72.5 °F)
- Avg. summer temperature: 45 °C (113 °F)
- Avg. winter temperature: 00 °C (32 °F)

Arenpura is a gram panchayat village in the Sumerpur Tehsil of the Pali district of Rajasthan, India. It contains Sonpura, Galthani, Balwana and Ramnagar villages.
