= Phulwari Ki Nal Wildlife Sanctuary =

Protected area in Rajasthan, India

- IUCN category IV (habitat/species management area)
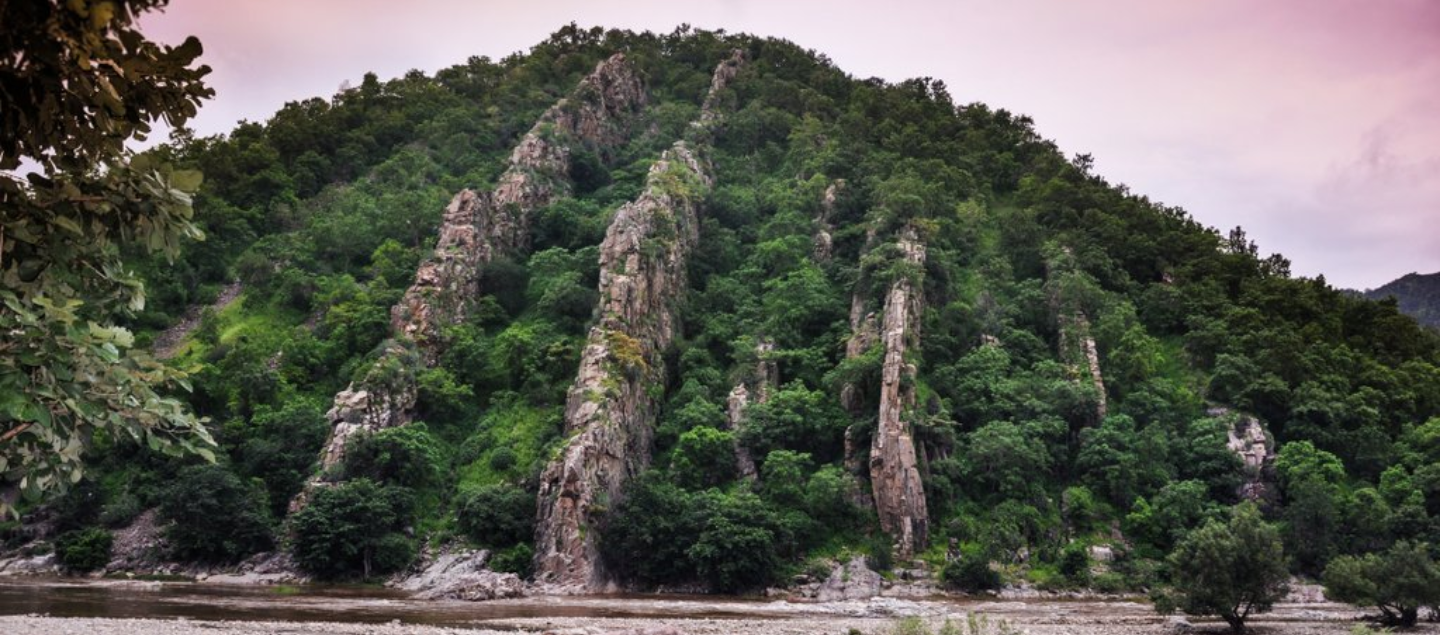
- Phulwari Ki Nal Wildlife Sanctuary

- Location within Rajasthan Location within India
- Interactive map of Phulwari Ki Nal Wildlife Sanctuary
- Location: Kotra tehsil and Jhadol tehsil, Udaipur district, Rajasthan, India
- Nearest city: Udaipur, Rajasthan
- Coordinates: 24°12′54″N 73°14′43″E
- Area: 511.41 km^{2} (197.46 sq mi)
- Established: 1983
- Governing body: Rajasthan State Forest Department

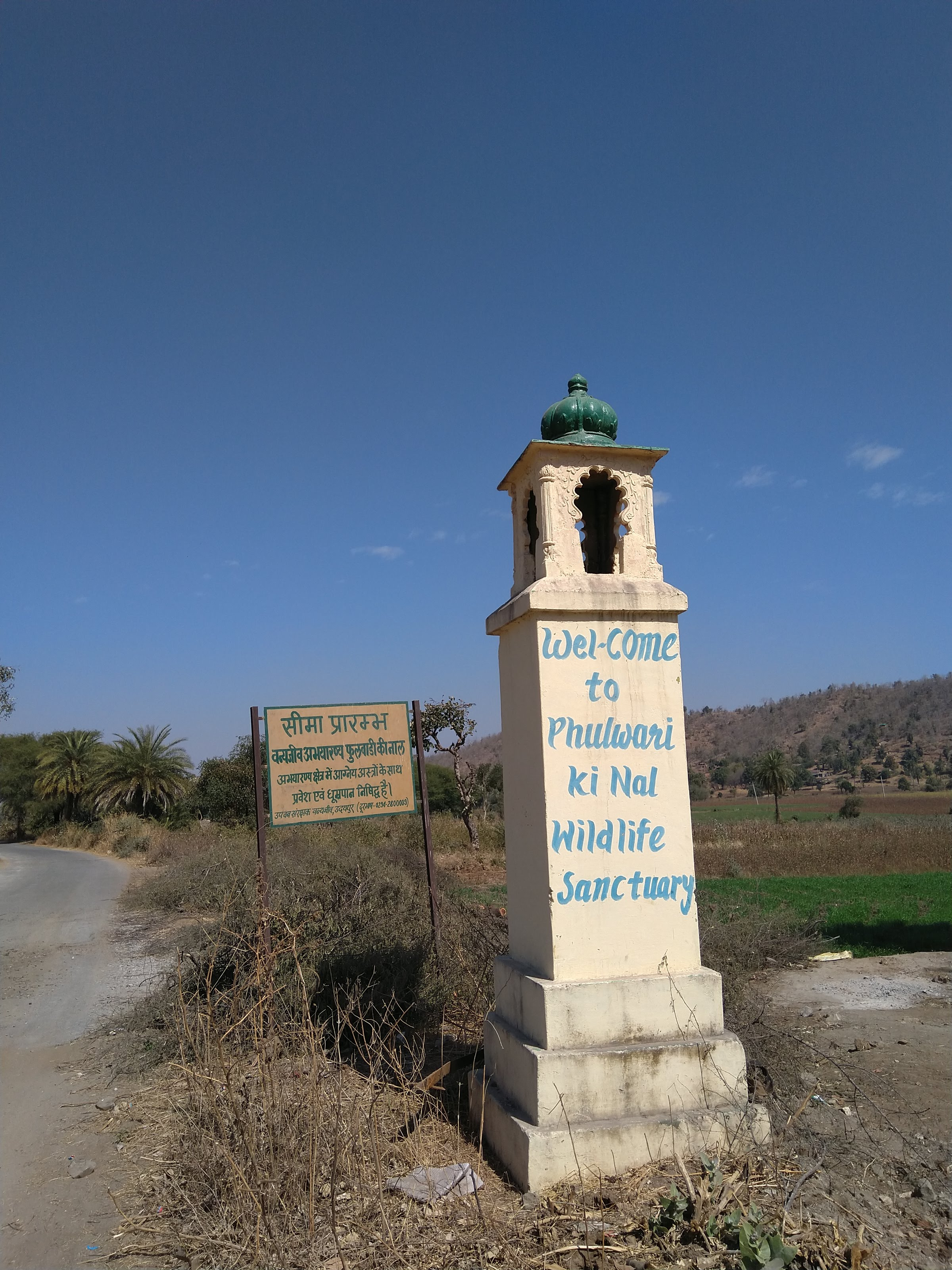
Boundary marker for the Sanctuary on the Kotra-Mamer-Khedbrahma road

Phulwari Ki Nal Wildlife Sanctuary is in Udaipur District of Rajasthan, in the southern Aravalli Hills bordering the state of Gujarat, India. It was declared a Wildlife Sanctuary on 6 October 1983 by the Government of Rajasthan.

== Geography ==
The area of the Phulwari Ki Nal Wildlife Sanctuary is 511.41 km^{2}, of which 365.92 km2 is Reserved Forest and 145.49 km2 is Protected Forests. The sanctuary is spread over Kotra and Jhadol tehsils of Udaipur district. There are 134 villages present inside the sanctuary. Elevation of the terrain within the sanctuary varies from 600–900 m above MSL. The climate in the sanctuary is classified as semi-arid, with an annual rainfall of 730 mm.

The Government of India published a draft notification on 31 August 2015 stating the intent to declare an area of up to 7.5 km from the outer boundaries of the sanctuary as an Eco-Sensitive Zone. In June 2024, the Eco-Sensitive Zone was declared covering an area of 202.34 square kilometres (78.12 sq mi).

== Wildlife ==
Wild animals observed in the Phulwari Ki Nal Wildlife Sanctuary include large-tailed nightjar, flying squirrel, three-striped palm squirrel, Indian chameleon, Indian star tortoise, mouse deer, four-horned antelope, and panther.

== Facilities ==
The Phulwari Ki Nal Wildlife Sanctuary is administered out of headquarters located in Kotra, Udaipur District, Rajasthan. There are three rest houses located inside and around the sanctuary, at Mamer, Panarwa, and Kotra.
