= Bharunda =

Village in Rajasthan, India

Bharunda is a village that comes under Sumerpur Tehsil in Pali district, Rajasthan. The Bharunda is an ancient village well connected to all surrounding villages and towns in the same vicinity.

== Profile ==
Bharunda is a village in Pali district. Bharunda is on the bank of River Jawai, which has been dried due to deforestation and limited rainfall. Recently, the village got a piped waterline and a cement road which have improved the hygiene level. Bharunda has two primary schools, one secondary and higher secondary school. It also has several temples such as Trikamji, Ramapir, Mamaji Bawasi. Bharunda also has connected local telephone exchange and post office. The STD dial code for Bharunda village is the same as Sumerpur, that is 02933.

== Climate and rainfall ==
The climate is different from that of other villages in western Rajasthan. Although, basically the summer season raises the temperature up to 46–47 degree Celsius at the peak time in May and June, a large variation in temperature is found, due to adjoining green and hilly areas. Winters are moderately cool during December and January, lowering the mercury to 4–5 degree Celsius occasionally.

== Demographics ==
Bharunda village population is 4,042 according to census 2001, where male population is 2,015, while female population is 2,027.

Bharunda has a cosmopolitan population with all residents following the Hindu religion. It has members from all caste, Raj put Ranawat including 40 rawla like of bada rawla, chota rawla ब्राह्मण, सुथार, रावना राजपूत, नाई,जैन, Vanik, Kumbhar, Meena, Darji, dmami, mali and Rabari. The mother tongue of the majority of people in Bharunda is Rajasthani ( read Marwari). Bharundaites are one of the thirteen million speakers in western Rajasthan speaking Marwari. Marwari (as well as indigenous Rajasthani languages) and Hindi are the most widely used languages in Bharunda.

== Geography ==
Bharunda is connected by road via Sumerpur and Sheoganj. At around 2 km distance on Bharunda Sumerpur road, there is a mountain named Kawar (also known as Bhuria baba ri dhuni). There is a mythological tale which indicates that Raja Bhruthhari and Guru Gorakhnath visited this place and the dhuni was established during that time. Bharunda is on the bank of the River Jawai, which has been dried due to deforestation and limited rainfall. Recently, the village got a piped waterline and cement road which has improved the hygiene level.

== Economy ==
Inhabitants of Bharunda are engaged in agriculture. Bharunda's economy is primarily agricultural and pastoral. Wheat and barley are cultivated all over, as are pulses, sugarcane, and oilseeds. Cotton and wheat are cash crops. There are mainly two crop seasons. The water for irrigation comes from wells and tanks. The Jawai Bandh Canal irrigates Bharunda and neighbouring villages. Many people from Bharunda have shifted to Mumbai in search of better prospects. The Gorwal Brahmin sect is prominently involved in textile trade in Mangaldas Market in Mumbai, Gomtiwal Brahmin have concentrated in Kurla and Thane. Some of Kumbhar and representatives of other castes have established medical stores in Mumbai. Suthars have a huge amount of construction work in the local areas. All of them have contributed to the development of village and the renovation of temples in the village. Of late the so-called "Gen Next - ( Youth) of this tiny village have embarked on the corporate world, by working successfully with many renowned Indian and MNC companies."

== Festivals ==
Villagers celebrate major Hindu festivals. Some of the major festivals are Holi, Deepawali, Makar Shakranti, Raksha Bandhan, Teez, threedivshiha pratistha mahotshav of the 120-year-old Jain temple. The temple of Sri Bihariji Maharaj is located in Bharunda.

== Torch Bearers ==
- Late. Shri Achleshwarji Chimanlalji Dave
- Late. Smt.Laxmiben Achleshwarji Dave
