= Koliwara =

- Village
- Location in Rajasthan, India Koliwara (India)
- Coordinates: 25.148°N 73.125°E
- Country: India
- State: Rajasthan
- District: Pali district

Population (2011)
  - Total: 3,545

Languages
  - Official: Hindi
- Time zone: UTC+5:30 (IST)
- PIN: 306126
- Telephone code: 02933
- ISO 3166 code: RJ-IN
- Vehicle registration: RJ-22
- Sex ratio: 925 ♂/♀

Koliwara is a small town located in Sumerpur Tehsil in Pali district, Rajasthan, India. It lies 4 km. from Sumerpur, 3 km. from Bhagawan Mahavir Hospital on Jawai Bandh road.

== Demographics ==
According to the 2011 census, the population of Koliwara was 3545. The male population was 1,842, while the female population was 1,703.. Koliwara is a small but well known village in Sumerpur tehsil.

== Education ==
In 2011, the literacy rate of Koliwara village was 65.08%, compared to 66.11% for Rajasthan. Male literacy stood at 79.87% and female literacy at 49.17%.

A new C.B.S.E board school and a college for higher education offering various courses has been opened near the outskirts of the village.

== Castes ==
Koliwara village has substantial population of Schedule Caste. Schedule Caste (SC) constitutes 26.74% while Schedule Tribe (ST) were 7.93% of total population in Koliwara village.
