= Kaniwada Hanuman Temple =

Historic shrine located in Jalore, Rajasthan

Kaniwada Hanuman temple
- कानीवाड़ा हनुमान मंदिर
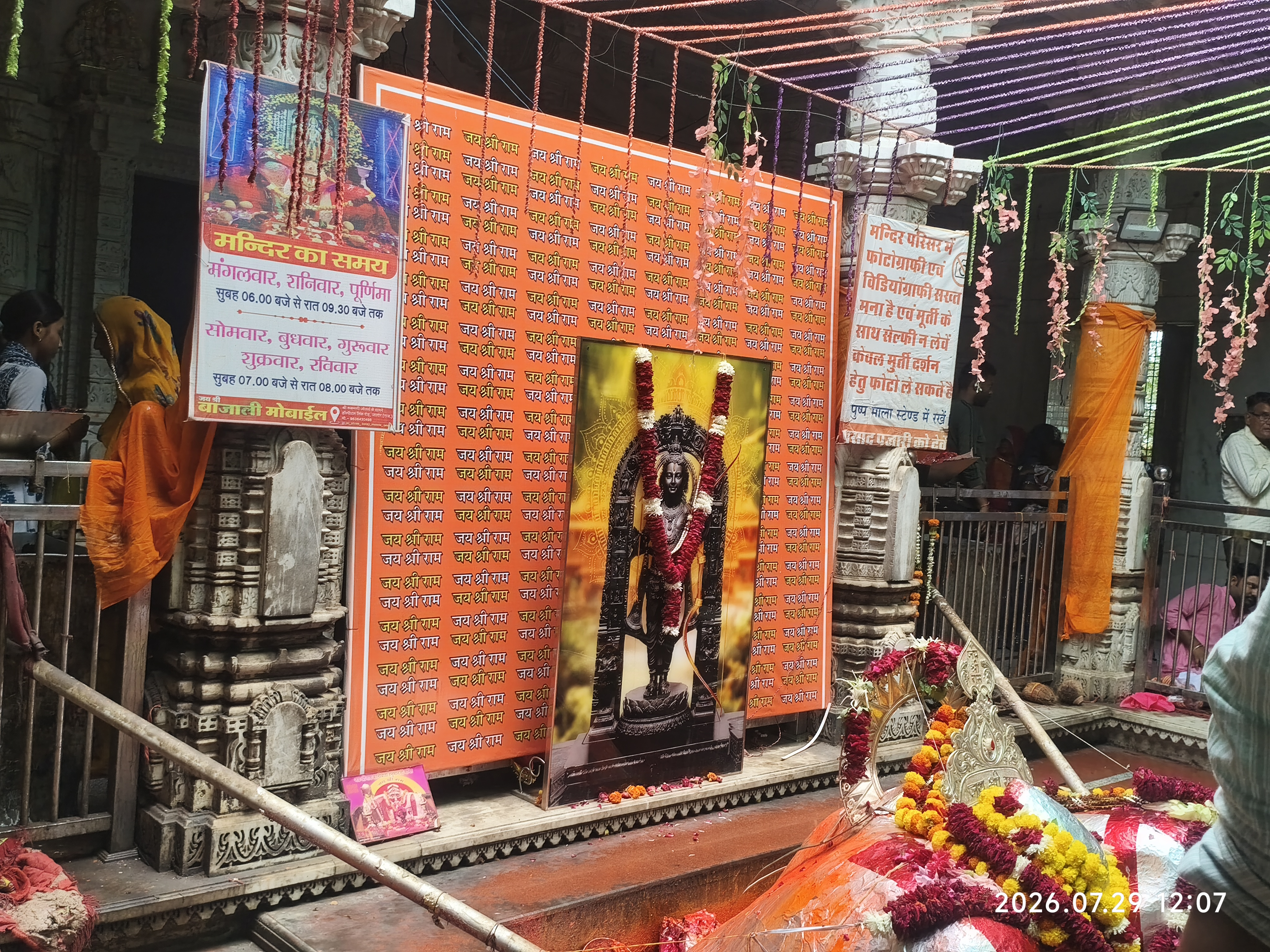

Religion
- Affiliation: Hinduism
- Deity: Hanuman

Location
- Location: Kaniwara, Jalore
- State: Rajasthan
- Country: India

Kaniwada Hanuman temple is an 800 year old temple in Jalore, Rajasthan.

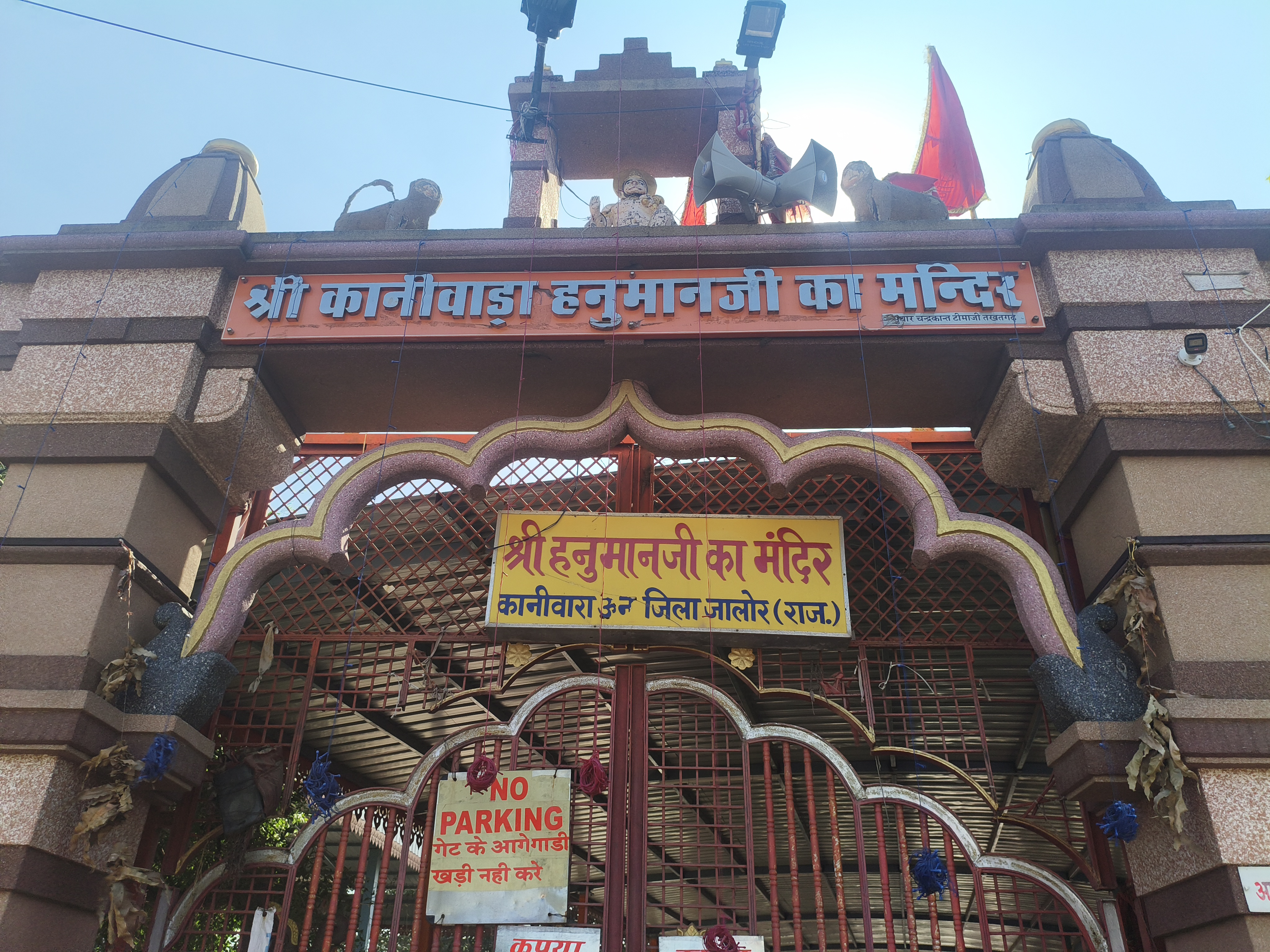
Kaniwada Hanuman temple

== Legend ==
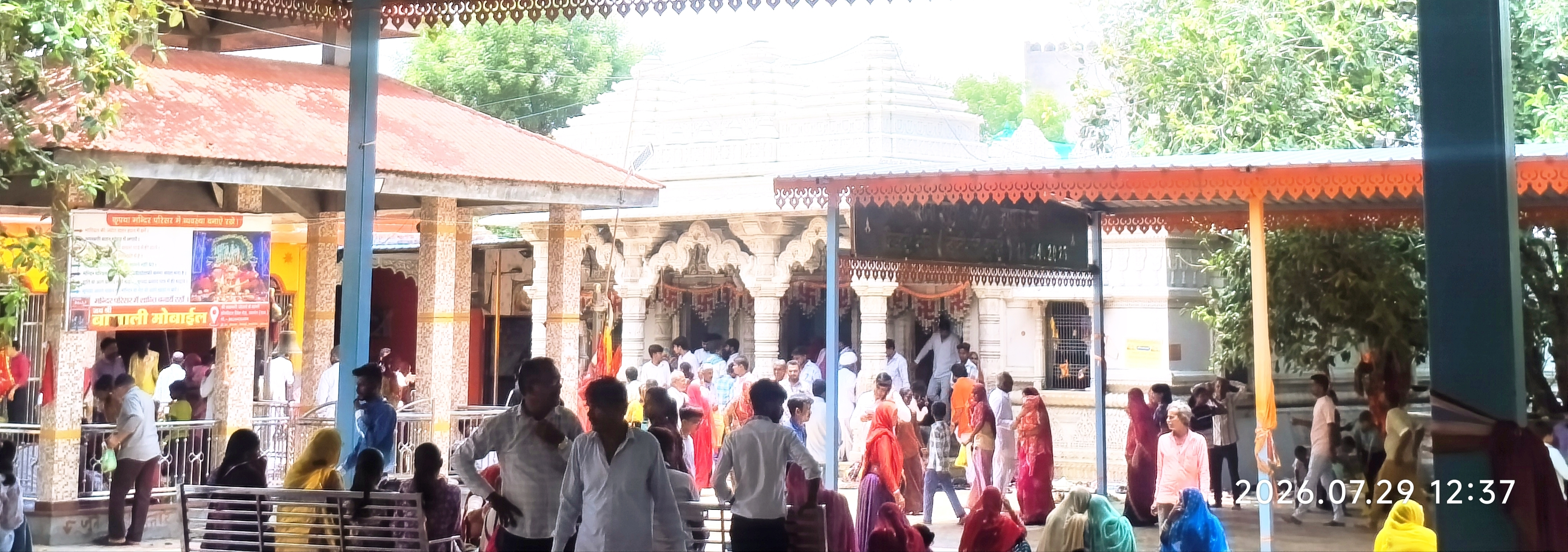
kaniwada hanuman mandir

According to a local legend, the idol of the Hindu deity Hanuman emerged from the earth during an excavation, hence it is also called Pataleshwar Hanumanji. The village was once known as Kani-Patal Nagar.
