= Padarali =

Padarli
- village
- Location in Rajasthan, India Padarli (India)
- Coordinates: 25.4000°N 72.9833°E
- Country: India
- State: Rajasthan
- District: Jalore

Government
  - Type: Panchayat
- Elevation: 197 m (646 ft)

Population (2001)
  - Total: 3,099

Languages
  - Official: Hindi
- Time zone: UTC+5:30 (IST)
- PIN: 307030
- Telephone code: +912978
- ISO 3166 code: RJ-IN
- Vehicle registration: RJ-16
- Sex ratio: 1067 ♂/♀

Padarli is a village in Ahore tehsil of Jalore District of Rajasthan state in India. It is situated near the town Takhatgarh.

== Demographics ==
Population of Padarli is 3469 according to census 2011. The male population is 1713 and the female population is 1756.

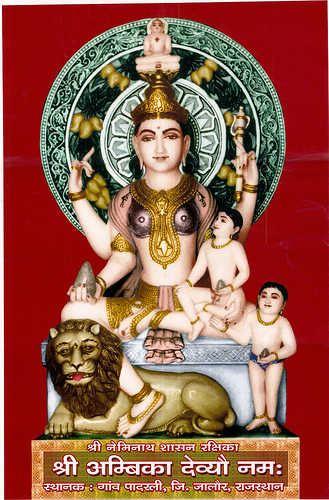
Shri Ambikadevi, Padarli, Rajasthan.
