= Virana =

Virana Virana
- Town
- Nickname(s): Vijayanagar & Veerana
- Location in Jalore, Rajasthan, India Virana (India)
- Coordinates: 25.333°N 72.367°E
- Country: India
- State: Rajasthan
- District: Jalor

Government
  - Type: Sayla Municipality
  - Body: Sayla Municipality
- Elevation: 117 m (384 ft)

Population (2011)
  - Total: 11,000

Languages
- Time zone: UTC+5:30 (IST)
- PIN: 343022
- Telephone code: 02977
- ISO 3166 code: RJ-IN
- Vehicle registration: RJ-16
- Sex ratio: 934 ♂/♀

Virana (also known as Veerana) is a village in Sayala Municipality located in Jalor district, Rajasthan, India.

== Demographics ==
As of 2011, the population of Virana is 2,447.

== Transport ==
=== Air ===
The nearest airport to Virana is Jodhpur Airport, located about 150 km away. Jodhpur Airport (IATA: JDH, ICAO: VIJO) has direct flights to Mumbai, Ahmedabad, Delhi, Indore, and Jaipur.

The second-nearest airport is Sardar Vallabhbhai Patel International Airport, approximately 315 km from Virana. This airport offers flights to destinations such as Mumbai, Hubballi, Bangalore, Chennai, and Hyderabad.

=== Bus ===
The town is well connected through direct bus routes to destinations such as Sayala, Jalore, Bhinmal, Raniwara, Sanchore, Mehsana, and Ahmedabad, among others.

The SRS AC Volvo Multiaxle Bus operates daily from Jalore to Bangalore via Hubli.

=== Train ===
The closest rail connection to Virana is Jalore Railway Station, located about 35 km away on the Bhinmal-Jalore rail route. Passenger trains connecting Palanpur and Samdari pass through this station.

Falna Railway Station, approximately 105 km from Virana, serves as the second closest station.

=== Petrol Pump ===
Virana has its own petrol pump, operated by Indian Oil, located on Jalore Road, 1.5 km from the town.
