= Harji =

- Village
- Harjee (हरजी)
- Location in Rajasthan, India Harji (India)
- Coordinates: 25.3000°N 72.8500°E
- Country: India
- State: Rajasthan
- District: Jalore
- Tehsil: Ahore
- Elevation: 197 m (646 ft)

Population (2011)
  - Total: 11,380

marvadi
  - Official: Hindi
- Time zone: UTC+5:30 (IST)
- PIN: 343001
- Telephone code: +912978
- ISO 3166 code: RJ-IN
- Vehicle registration: RJ-16
- Sex ratio: 1056 ♂/♀

Harji is a village in Ahore tehsil of Jalore District of Rajasthan state in India. It is situated on the road from Sirohi to Jalore, also known for the traditional art of making holy horses. Harjee has a total population of 7,099 people according to Census 2011.
