= Kotra, Huzur tehsil, Bhopal =

Kotra
- village
- Location within Madhya Pradesh Location within India
- Coordinates: 23.103019°N 77.491726°E
- Country: India
- State: Madhya Pradesh
- District: Bhopal
- Tehsil: Huzur

Population (2011)
  - Total: 154
- Time zone: UTC+5:30 (IST)
- ISO 3166 code: MP-IN
- Census code: 482539

Kotra is a village in the Bhopal district of Madhya Pradesh, India. It is located in the Huzur tehsil and the Phanda block.

== Demographics ==
According to the 2011 census of India, Kotra has 38 households. The effective literacy rate (i.e. the literacy rate of population excluding children aged 6 and below) is 79.83%.

Demographics (2011 Census)
	Total	Male	Female
Population	154	77	77
Children aged below 6 years	35	16	19
Scheduled caste	16	8	8
Scheduled tribe	5	0	5
Literates	95	53	42
Workers (all)	77	40	37
Main workers (total)	25	20	5
Main workers: Cultivators	6	3	3
Main workers: Agricultural labourers	3	3	0
Main workers: Household industry workers	0	0	0
Main workers: Other	16	14	2
Marginal workers (total)	52	20	32
Marginal workers: Cultivators	7	6	1
Marginal workers: Agricultural labourers	37	10	27
Marginal workers: Household industry workers	0	0	0
Marginal workers: Others	8	4	4
Non-workers	77	37	40
