= Jawai River =

Coordinates: 24°52′N 72°0′E

Jawai
- Interactive Map

Location
- Country: India

Physical characteristics
- Source
  - location: Goriya village of Bali town of Pali District, located on the border of Pali and Udaipur district.
- Mouth
  - location: joins the Khari river near Sayala/Virana village in Jalore district.

Basin features
- Cities: Sumerpur; Sheoganj

The Jawai River originates in the hills of Goriya village, situated in Bali tehsil of Pali district, near the border of Pali and Udaipur districts.

Sukri river is its main tributary. The river flows in a north-west direction for about 96 km (60 mi), before joining Khari River near Sayala in Jalore district, after which it is called Sukri river. Its catchment area is 2,976 km^{2} (1,149 sq mi) in Udaipur, Pali and Jalore districts.

Western Rajasthan's largest dam, Jawai Dam, is located near Sumerpur in Pali district on this river. The twin cities of Sumerpur and Sheoganj in Sirohi district are located on the banks of Jawai river.
