= National Highway 325 (India) =

National Highway in India

National Highway 325
- Map of National Highway 325 in red

Route information
- Length: 135 km (84 mi)

Major junctions
- West end: Balotra
- East end: Sanderao

Location
- Country: India
- States: Rajasthan
- Primary destinations: Bishangarh, Jalore, Ahore, Takhatgarh

Highway system
- Roads in India; Expressways; National; State; Asian
← NH 25	→ NH 62

National Highway 325 (NH 325) is a National Highway in India that connects Balotra, Rajasthan, with Sanderao, Rajasthan. The total length of NH 325 is 135 kilometres (84 mi). This highway connects NH 25 in Balotra to NH 62 in Sanderao.

== Route ==
Balotra, Siwana, Bishangarh, Jalore, Ahore, Takhatgarh, Sanderao.

== Junctions ==
Terminal with National Highway 25 near Balotra.

Terminal with National Highway 62 near Sandera.

== See also ==
- List of national highways in India
