= Kotra, Berasia tehsil, Bhopal =

Kotra
- village
- Location within Madhya Pradesh Location within India
- Coordinates: 23.655840°N 77.276370°E
- Country: India
- State: Madhya Pradesh
- District: Bhopal
- Tehsil: Berasia

Population (2011)
  - Total: 822
- Time zone: UTC+5:30 (IST)
- ISO 3166 code: MP-IN
- Census code: 482103

Kotra is a village in the Bhopal district of Madhya Pradesh, India. It is located in the Berasia tehsil.

== Demographics ==
According to the 2011 census of India, Kotra has 150 households. The effective literacy rate (i.e. the literacy rate of population excluding children aged 6 and below) is 58.19%.

Demographics (2011 Census)
	Total	Male	Female
Population	822	435	387
Children aged below 6 years	138	69	69
Scheduled caste	95	53	42
Scheduled tribe	47	21	26
Literates	398	264	134
Workers (all)	361	219	142
Main workers (total)	168	159	9
Main workers: Cultivators	118	117	1
Main workers: Agricultural labourers	39	34	5
Main workers: Household industry workers	0	0	0
Main workers: Other	11	8	3
Marginal workers (total)	193	60	133
Marginal workers: Cultivators	100	28	72
Marginal workers: Agricultural labourers	88	28	60
Marginal workers: Household industry workers	0	0	0
Marginal workers: Others	5	4	1
Non-workers	461	216	245
