= Jawai Dam =

Jawai dam
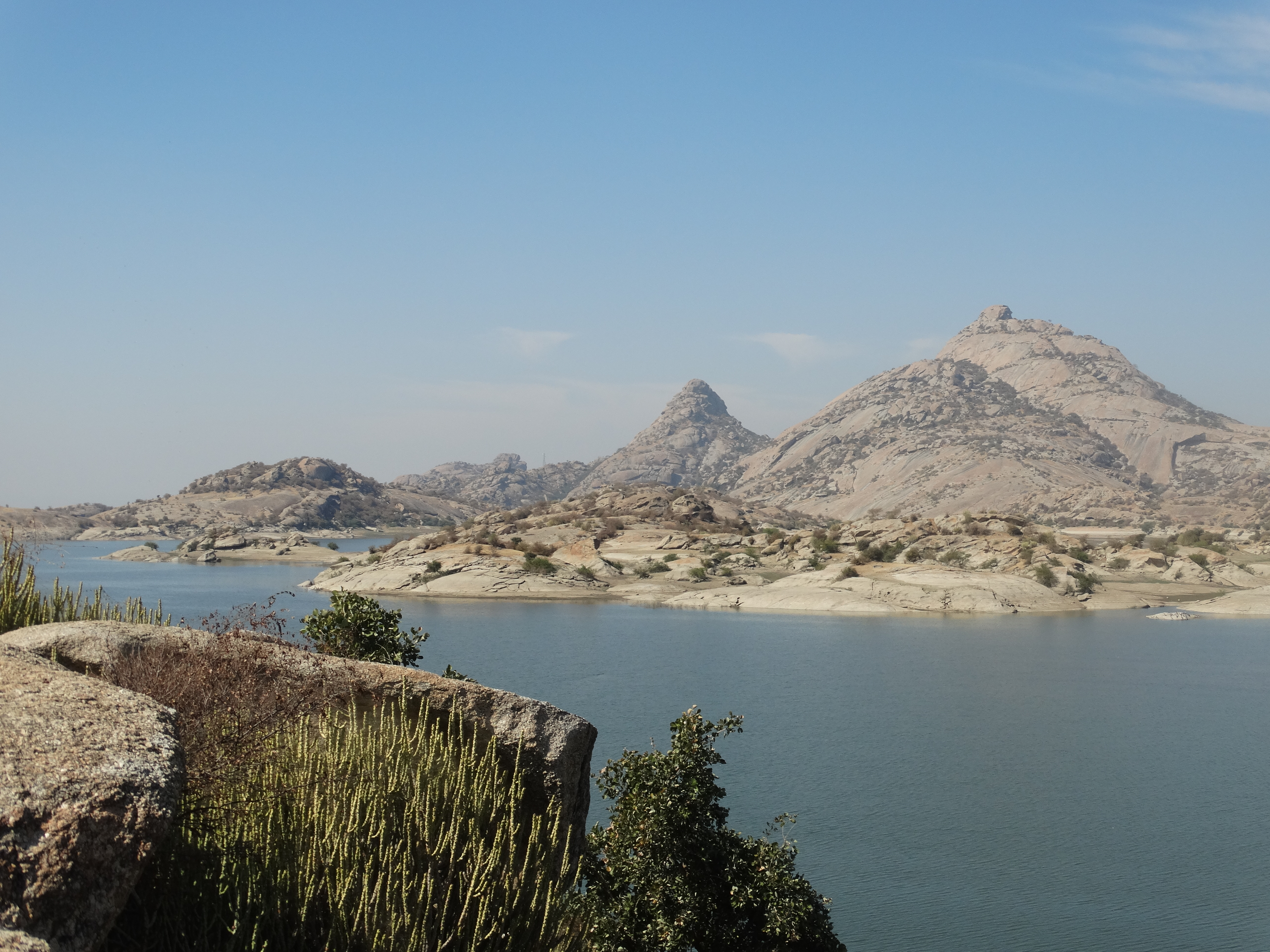
- Jawai dam
- Interactive map of Jawai dam
- Country: India
- Location: Near Koliwara, Pali district, Rajasthan
- Coordinates: 25.090569°N 73.149381°E
- Purpose: Irrigation and water supply
- Opening date: 1956–57
- Owner: Rajasthan Water Resources Department
- Operator: Rajasthan Water Resources Department

Dam and spillways
- Type of dam: Earthen and masonry
- Impounds: Jawai River
- Height (foundation): 51 m
- Spillway capacity: 150,000 cubic metres per second

Reservoir
- Total capacity: 207.5 MCM
- Active capacity: 193.5 MCM

Jawai Bandh is a dam built across the Jawai River, a tributary of Luni River, in Pali district, Rajasthan, India.

== Geography and History ==
The dam is situated near Sumerpur town in Pali District of Rajasthan state in India. The dam was built by Maharaja Umaid Singh of Jodhpur.

The idea of building a dam over River Jawai was conceived in 1903 as its flooding waters caused heavy damage in Pali and Jalore district during monsoon. It was finally given shape in 1946. The project was to construct a dam across the river, creation of water reservoir, which could be used for water irrigation and hydel power generation. The work started on 12 May 1946. By 1951, when first 5-year plan was launched, nearly 124 Lakh Rupees were already spent on this project. The hydel project was suspended, since sufficient pressure was not likely to be available throughout the year, after meeting the irrigation demand. Revised estimated cost was revised to Rupees 300 Lakhs. Project completed in 1957.

This dam covers an area of 13 km^{2}. This is the biggest man made dam in western Rajasthan. The dam has the capacity of 7887.5 million cubic feet and covers an area of 102,315 acres (414.05 km^{2}) of cultivable command area. Its height is about 61.25 feet (18.67 m). Sei Dam and Kalibor Dam are the feeder dams of the Jawai Dam. The catchment area of the dam site is 720 square kilometres, and the basin is in the shape of a fan.

It is the main water supply source for Pali district. If there is sufficient water in the dam, then some villages of Jalore district and Pali district get water for irrigation from the Jawai Dam, which was the main aim in making this dam.

== Dispute in Jalore District ==
The Jawai Dam water dispute in Rajasthan's Jalore district revolves around the release of water from the Jawai Dam, constructed on a tributary of the Luni River, and has been a contentious issue since the dam's inception in 1957. The dispute has culminated in a significant protest, popularly known as a 'mahapadav', staged by hundreds of farmers demanding a rightful share of the dam's water. Jawai Dam is one of the best places in Rajasthan for leopard sightings and birdwatching.

=== Background and Construction ===
The Jawai Dam, located on a tributary of the Luni River, was built to harness water resources for agricultural and irrigation purposes. However, its construction led to an ongoing dispute over the allocation of water, particularly for the farmers in Jalore district. This dispute has persisted for decades and has resulted in adverse consequences for the farming communities in the region.

=== The Mahapadav Protest ===
In an effort to draw attention to their plight and demand a fair share of water from the Jawai Dam, hundreds of farmers from 186 villages in Rajasthan's Jalore district initiated a 'mahapadav' or a prolonged sit-in protest. The protesters, primarily from villages situated along the Jawai River, have been living at the district headquarters in Jalore. Their core demand is for the release of one-third of the water stored in the dam to ensure a natural flow into the Jawai river. This natural flow is seen as crucial for replenishing groundwater levels and supporting crop irrigation.

=== Demands and Concerns ===
The protesting farmers are united in their demand for a share in the water resources of the Jawai Dam. They highlight that the dam's construction has led to a reduction in the natural flow of the Jawai River, negatively impacting their ability to draw water from wells and tubewells. As a result, many of these water sources have become unfit for use, affecting agricultural activities and livelihoods in the region.

=== Government Response and Way Forward ===
The state government's response to the farmers' demands has been a matter of contention. Despite the allocation of funds for the dam's recharge, there has been limited progress in addressing the concerns raised by the farmers. The protesters continue to assert that their struggle will persist until a comprehensive solution is reached.

== Biodiversity ==
Jawai is known for its leopard sightings, bird watching, and a large crocodile population. Many migratory bird species are spotted here during the winter season. And as of 2020, there were 377 crocodiles in Jawai Dam.

== Gallery ==
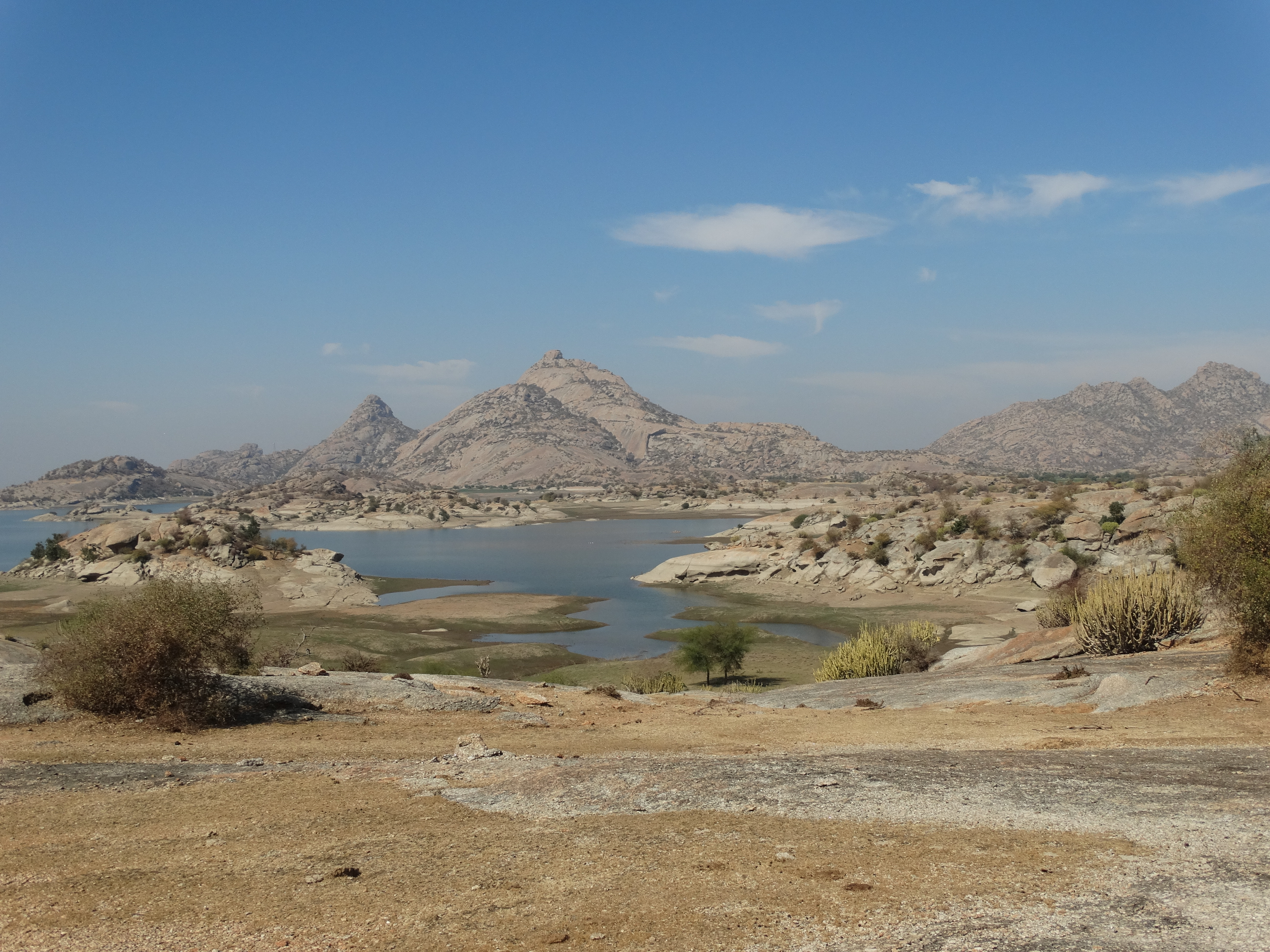
This image is captured from the backside of Jawai Bandh.

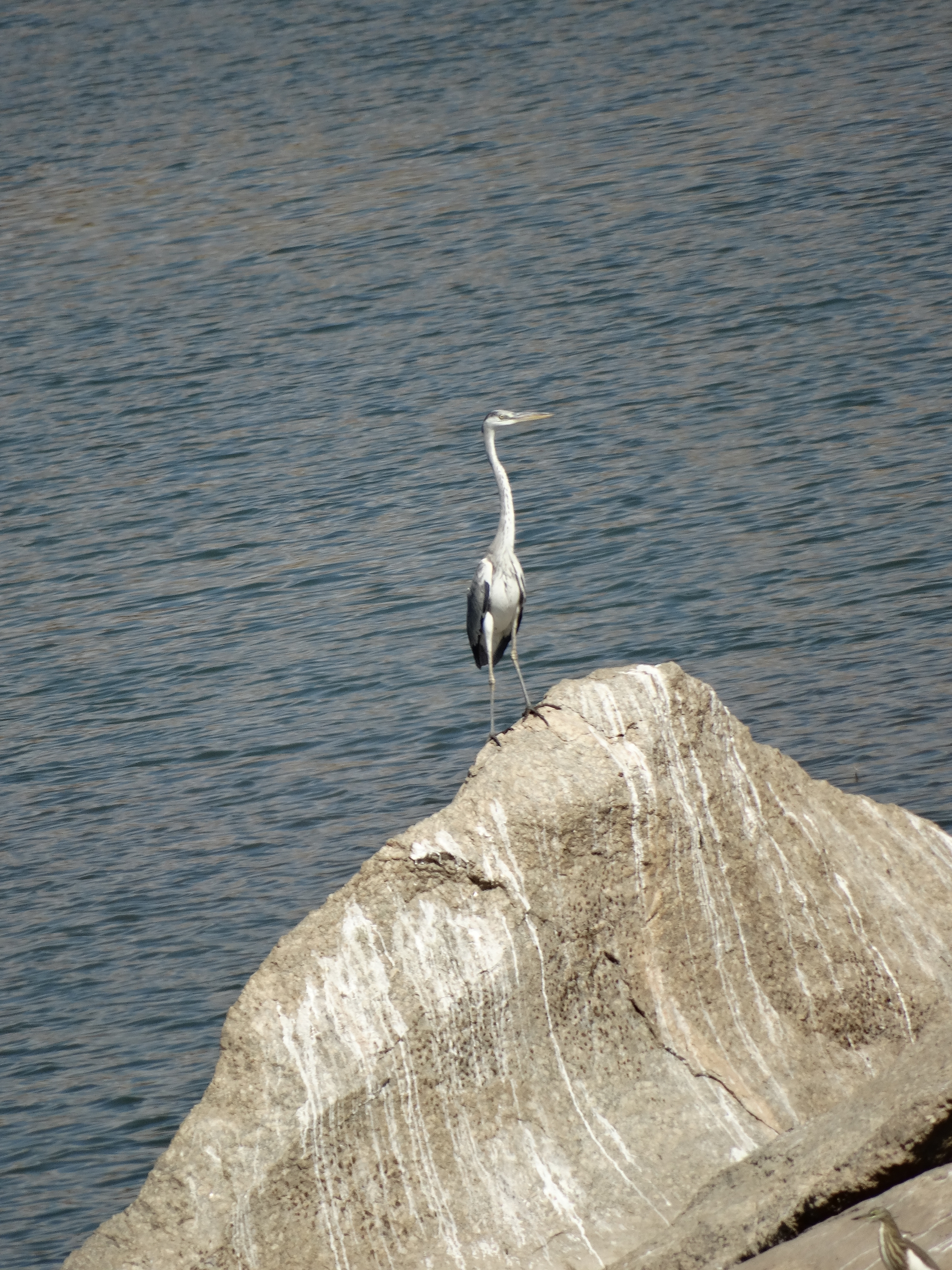
Grey heron at Jawai Lake.

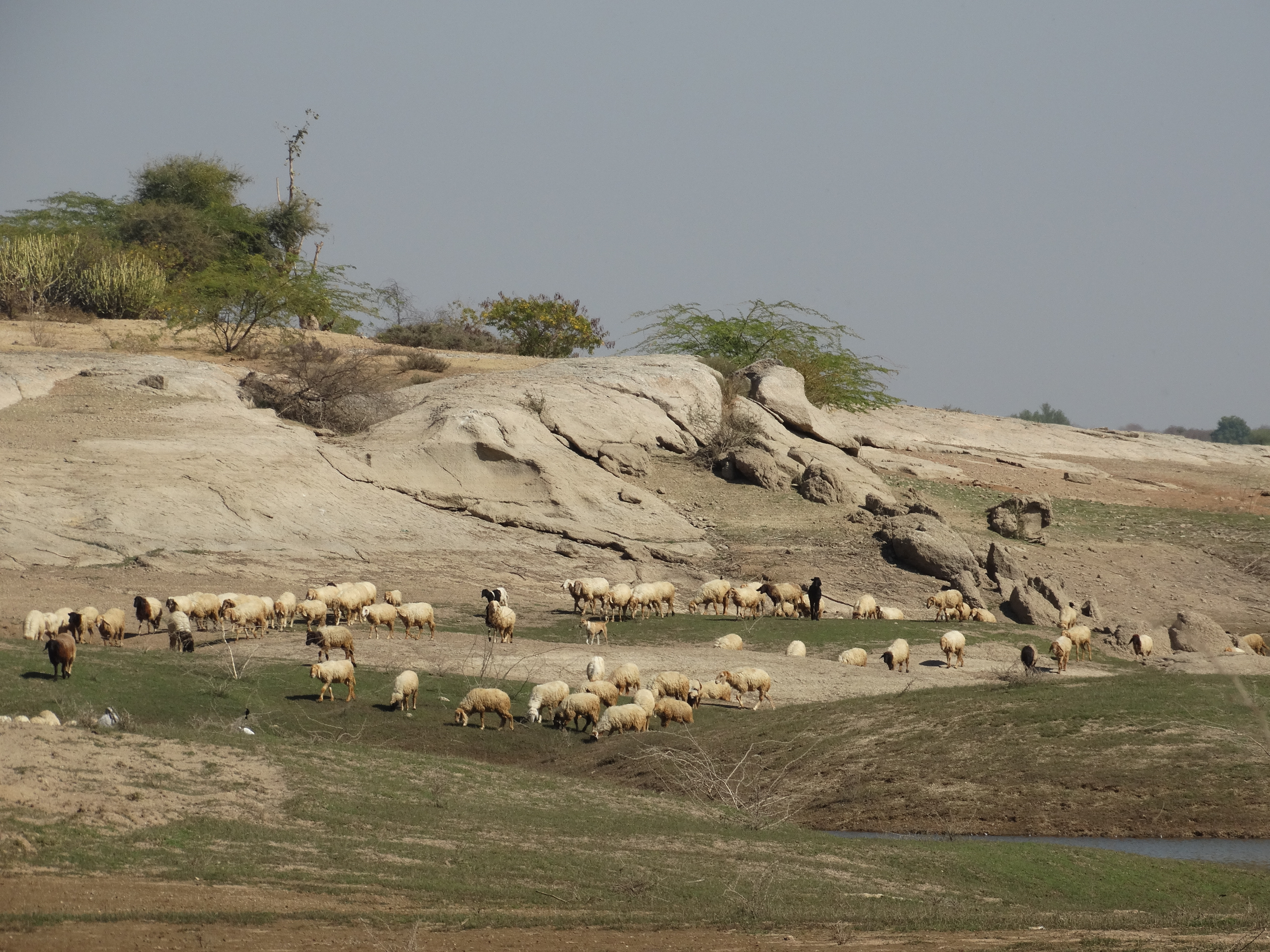
Sheep belonging to Rabari people grazing at Jawai.

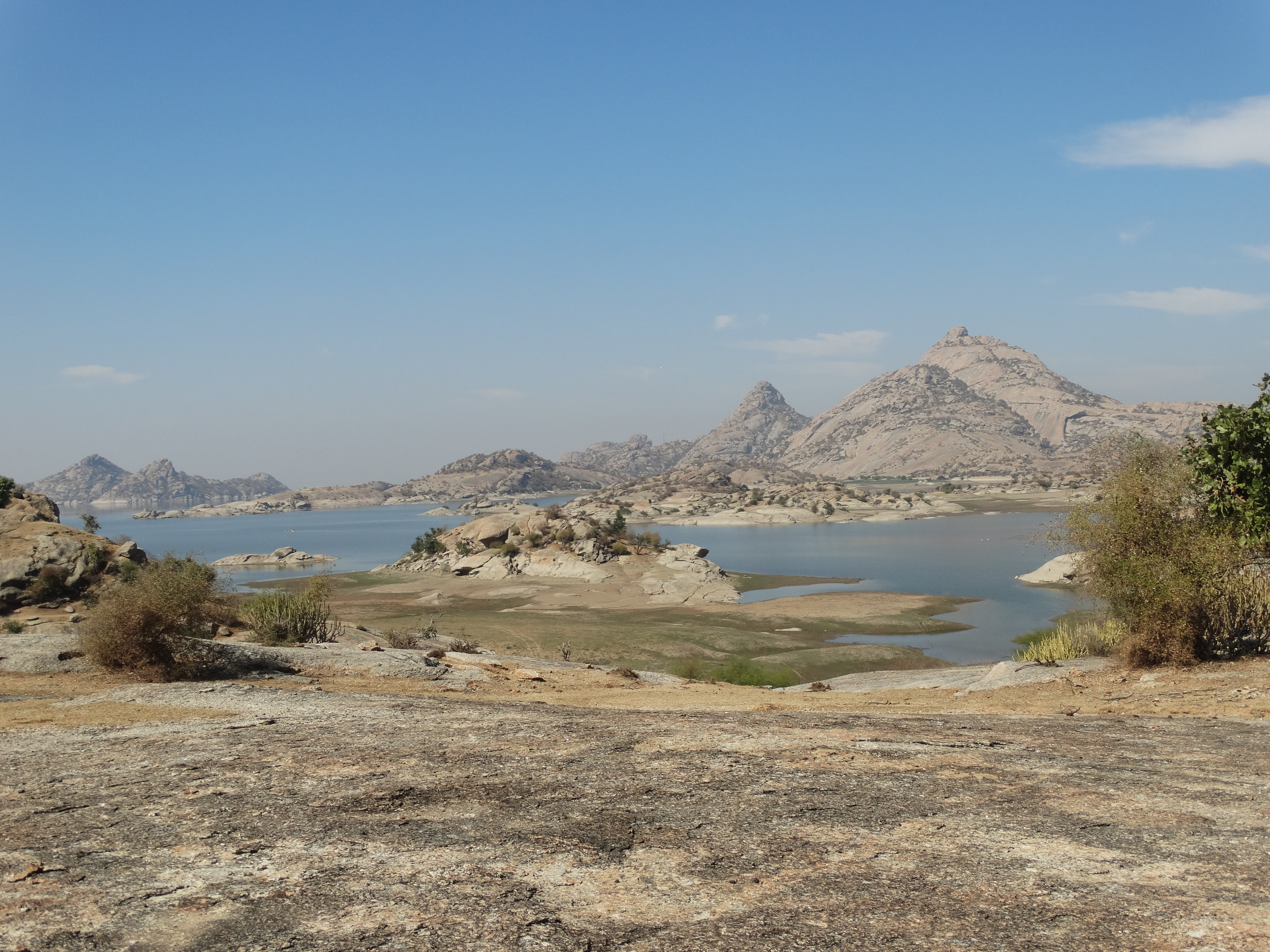
Scenic beauty of Jawai Dam. This image captures the amount of water level that has reduced in this Dam.

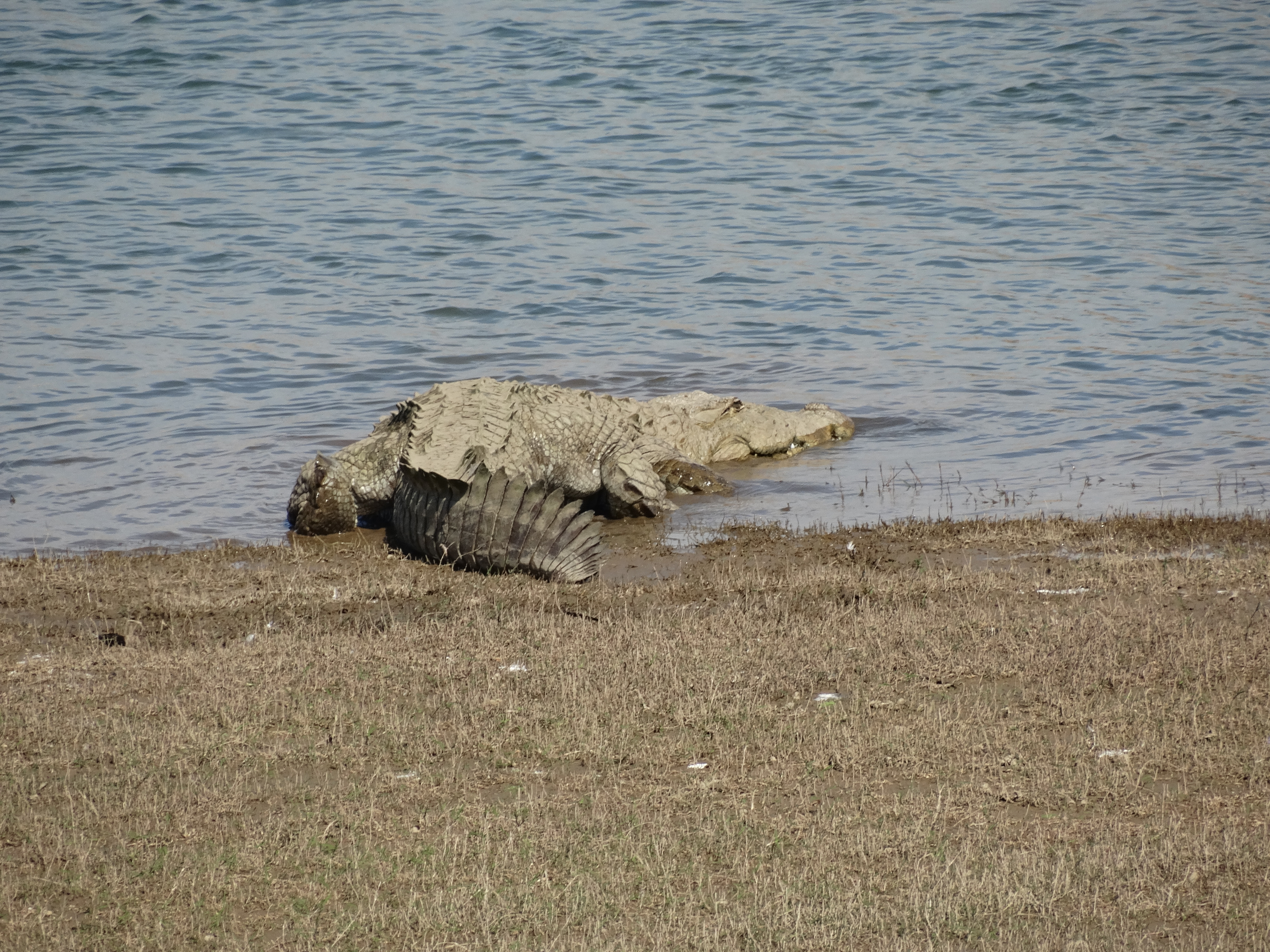
Jawai Dam is home to crocodiles that rest on the shores during the day or wait for their prayers to come nearby.

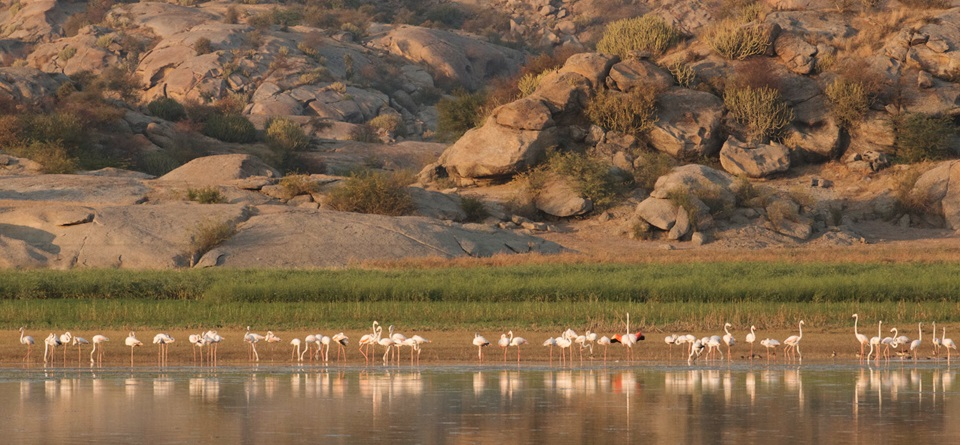
Flamingo sighting at Jawai Dam

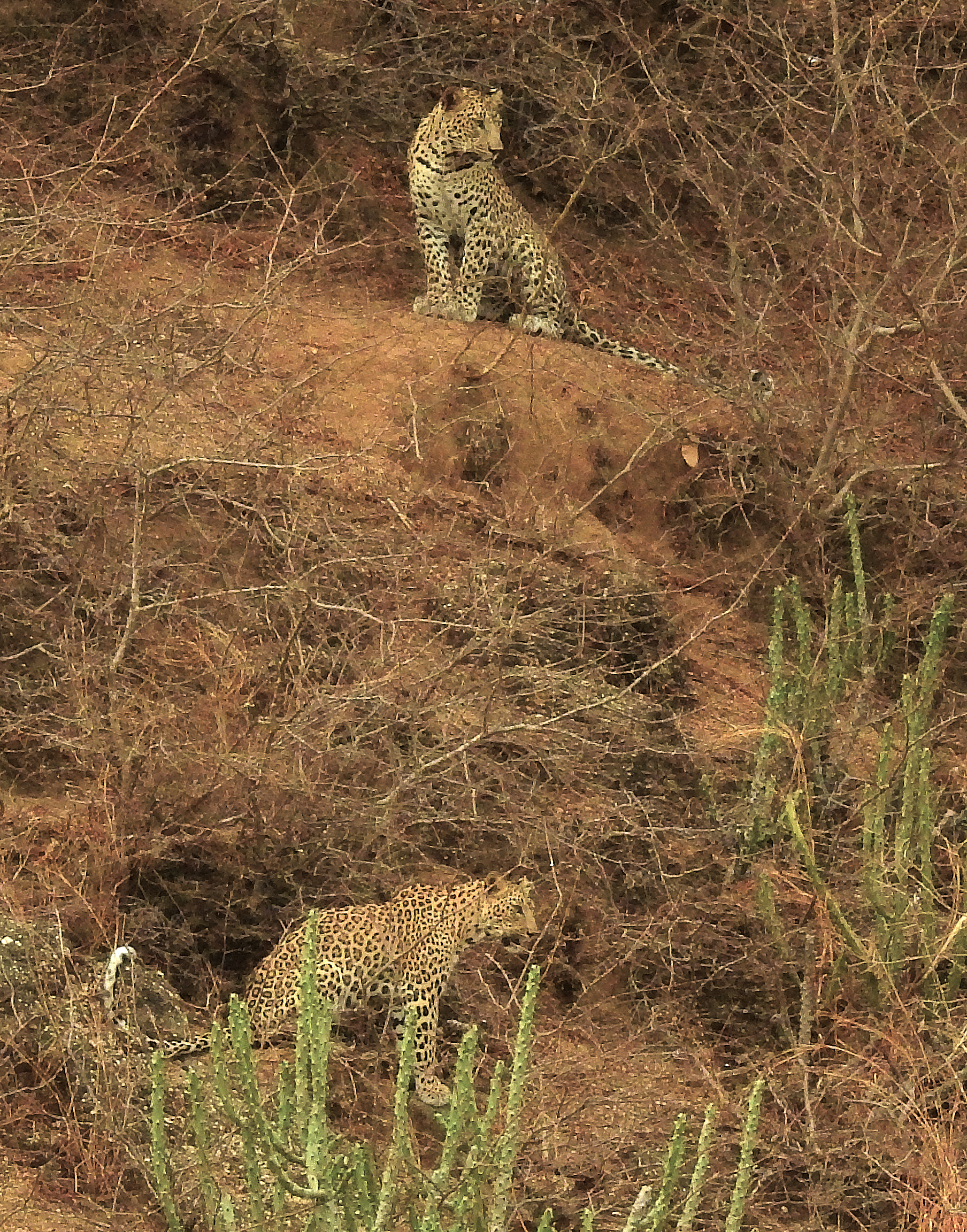
Leopard sighting near Jawai Dam

A leopard seen during safari at Jawai Bandh.

Black-winged stilt (Himantopus himantopus) at Jawai Dam

== Sources ==
- Sehgal, K.K. (1976). Rajasthan [district Gazetteers].: Pali. Gazetteer of India. Printed at Government Central Press.
- "Jawai Safari". Jawai Safari.
