= Kotra tehsil =

Tehsil in Udaipur, Rajasthan, India

- Tehsil
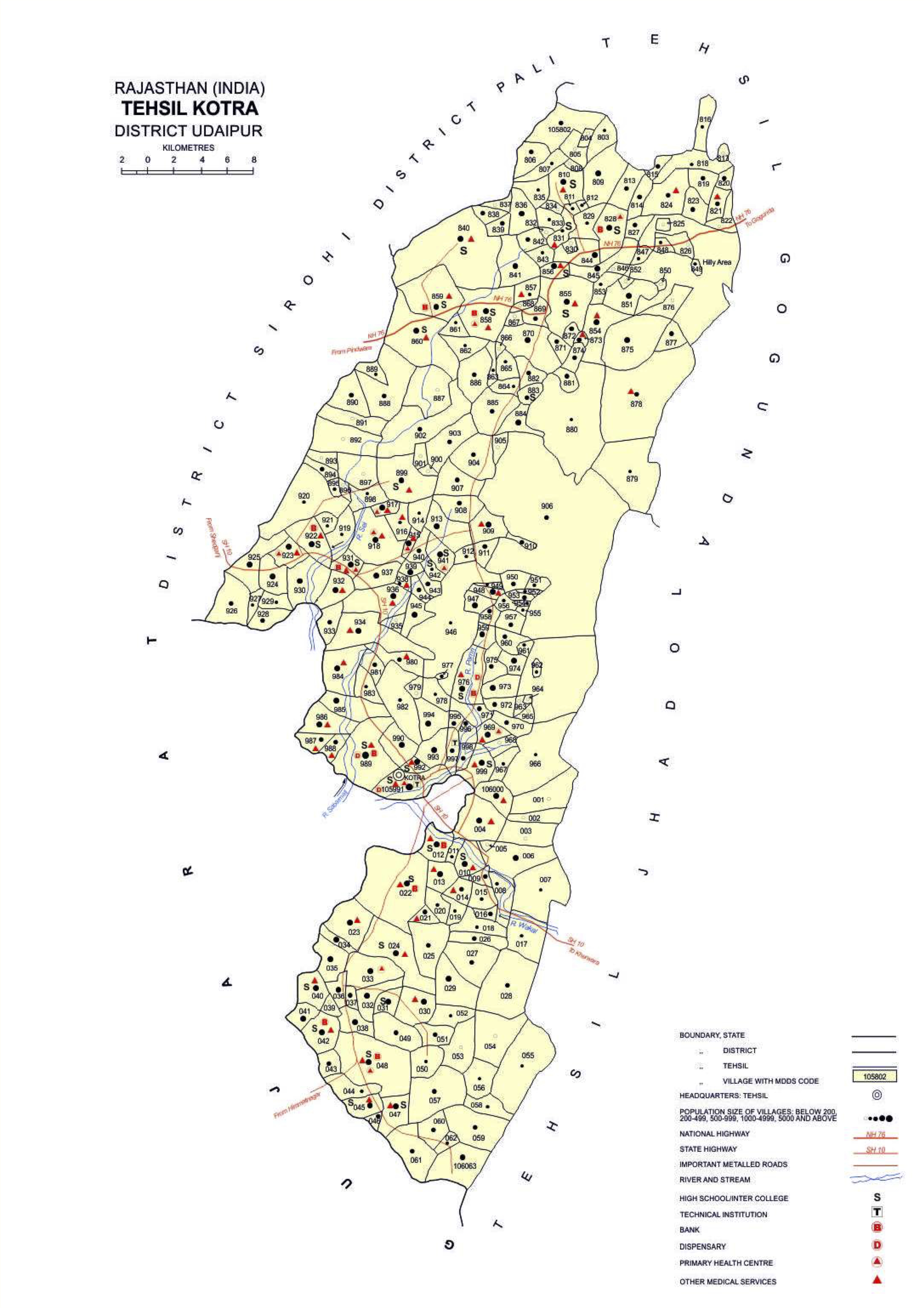
- Kotra tehsil

- Location of Jhadol tehsil Kotra tehsil (India)
- Coordinates: 24.455754°N 73.208047°E
- Tehsil: Kotra

Area
  - Total: 1,110 km^{2} (430 sq mi)

Population (2011)
  - Total: 230,532
  - Density: 208/km^{2} (538/sq mi)
- Time zone: Indian Standard Time

Kotra (also spelt Kotda) is a tehsil of Udaipur district in Rajasthan, India, consisting of 262 revenue villages and 31 panchayats. The tehsil is bordered to the north by Pali and Sirohi districts, to the east by Gogunda and Jhadol tehsils, and to the south by Gujarat state. The tehsil headquarter is located in the village of Kotra, southwest of the Udaipur at a distance of 57 km and 120 km by road.

== History ==
In the erstwhile Mewar State, present-day Kotra tehsil was part of the Kotra Bhumat (also spelt Bhumiat), an area comprising 242 villages. Bhumat was characterized by a system of land tenure under which petty chieftains held tenure known as bhum (spelt as bhom in certain sources). The Kotra Bhumat was administered by the chieftains of Jura, Oghna, and Panarva, who paid a small tribute to the Mewar Durbar and were liable to be called on for local service. The Kotra Bhumat could be distinguished from other parts of Mewar by the fact that "the Bhils [there] were never conquered: even the jagirdars (were) of Bhil ancestry."

During the British Raj, Kotra was directly under the political supervision of the second in command of the Mewar Bhil Corps and a cantonment was situated in the village of Kotra. The 1908 Imperial Gazetteer describes Kotra as a cantonment where a detachment (two companies) is quartered. Kotra was the site of the oldest medical institutions in the Mewar State, when regimental hospitals of the Mewar Bhil Corps were opened in 1818.

In 1949, Udaipur State merged into Greater Rajasthan, and Udaipur district was formed with 18 tehsils, of which Kotra was one. The Kotra panchayat samiti started functioning in 1959. Between the census of 2001 and 2011, approximately 60 villages in the northeastern portion of the tehsil were reassigned to Gogunda and Jhadol tehsils.

Whereas revenue settlement begun in some parts of Udaipur district in 1879, but it was not until 1955 that Kotra tehsil was settled, when 304 villages were settled.

== Geography ==
The area of Kotra tehsil is 1,110.93 square kilometres. The annual average rainfall in Kotra tehsil is 800.7 mm, with an average of 35 rainy days per year.

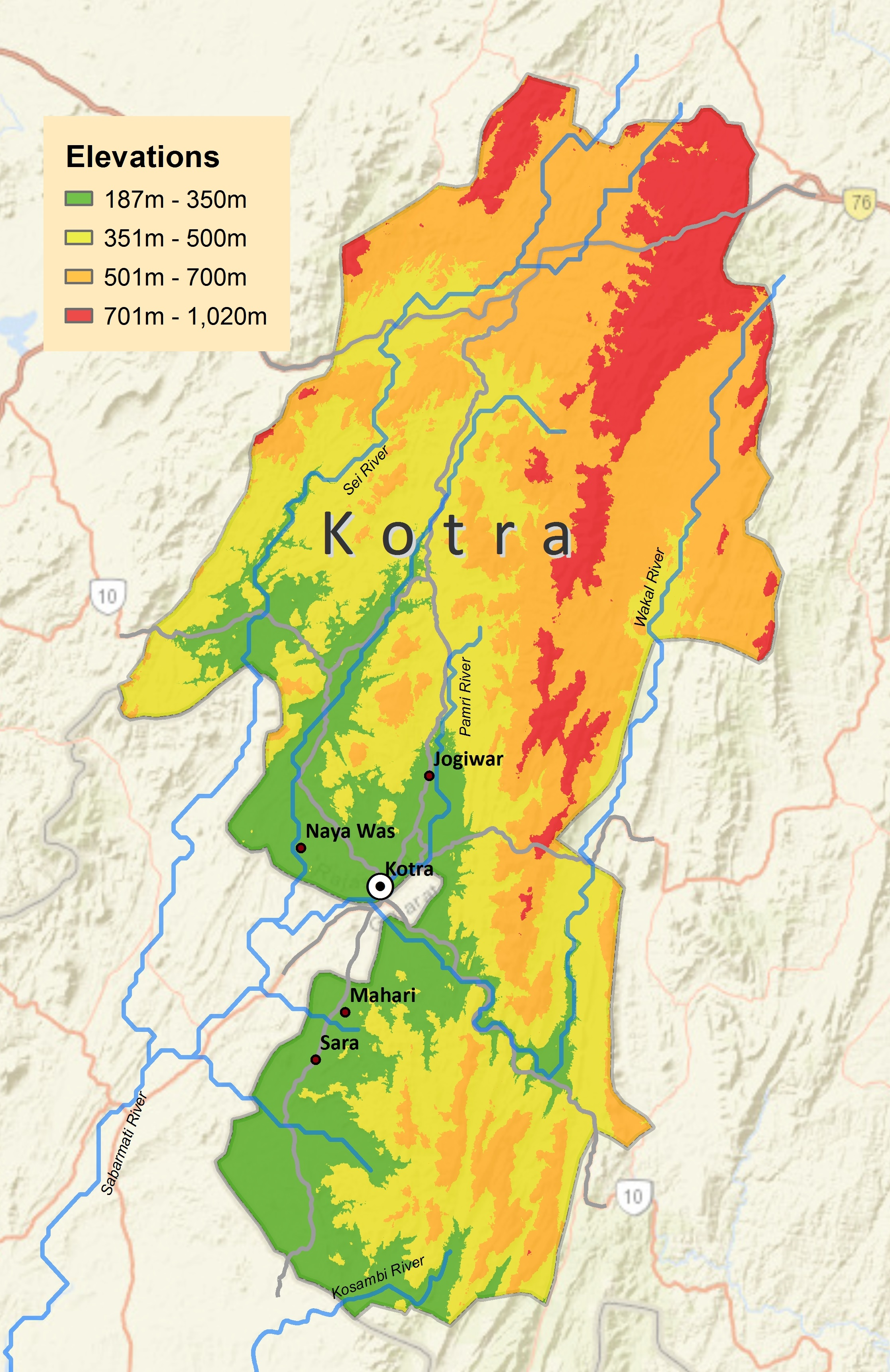
Terrain of Kotra Tehsil

Ground elevations in the tehsil range from 187 m (above Mean Sea Level) to 1,017 m. Elevations in the northern and eastern parts of the tehsil are generally higher, sloping down in a southwesterly direction towards the Sabarmati River and its tributaries.

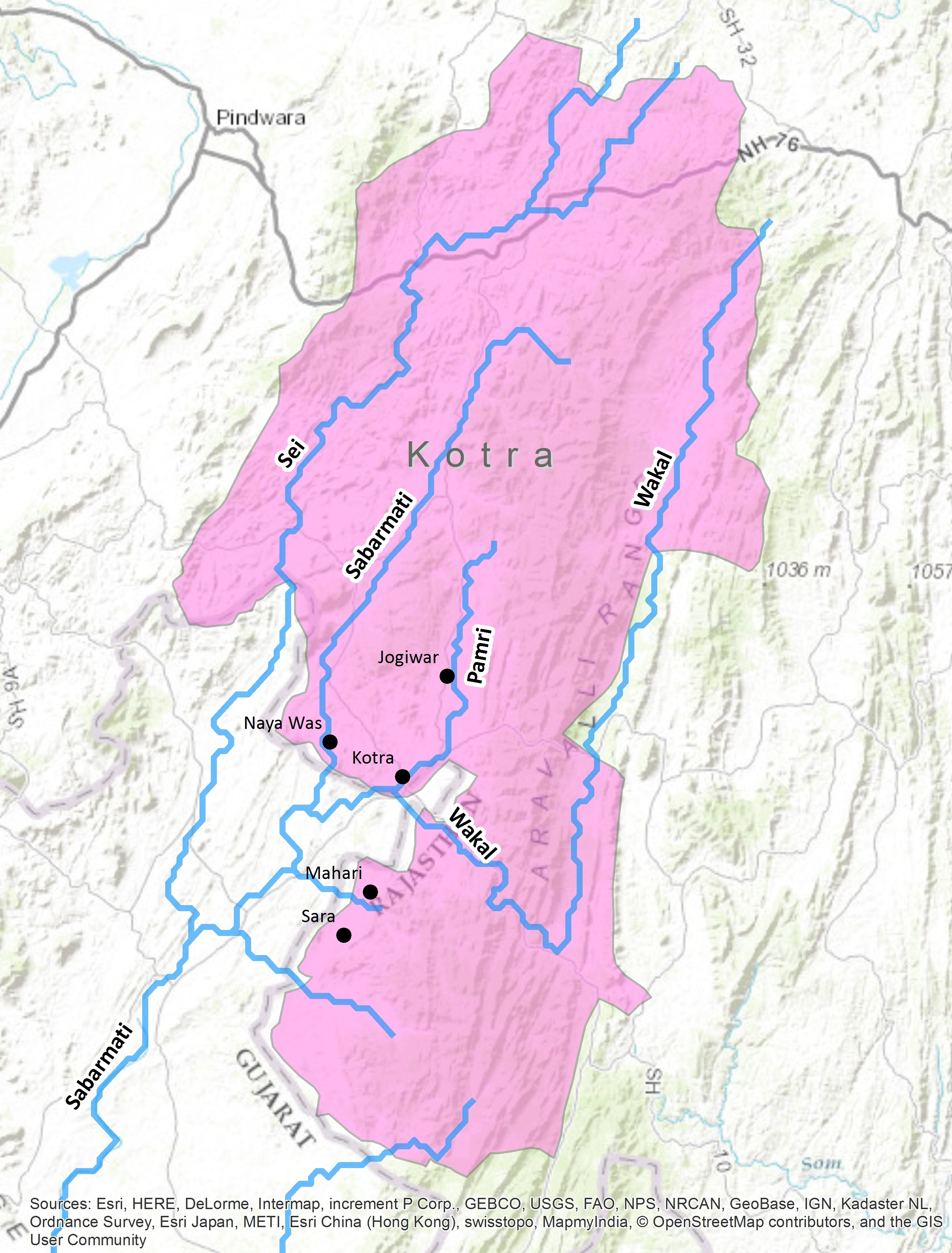
Rivers of Kotra Tehsil

Major rivers in Kotra are Sei, Sabarmati, Pamri, Wakal, Divav and Kosambi. The general direction of the rivers is north to south. The Sei Dam is located on the Sei River in northern Kotra tehsil near the village of Teja ka Bas. This is a 28 m high dam which is used to impound water not for use downstream of the dam, but for inter-basin transfer to Jawai dam in neighbouring Pali district.

The Phulwari Ki Nal Wildlife Sanctuary is partially situated in Kotra tehsil.

== Economy ==
Economic activities and livelihood opportunities in Kotra tehsil are limited; this has been attributed to small land holdings, poor quality of natural resources, lack of irrigation, and low literacy levels. Thus, the economy of Kotra depends heavily on migration. A 2006 survey found that at least one member from nearly half of Kotra households (49.2%) leave the tehsil to seek employment. The chief destination for Kotra emigrants is the state of Gujarat (66% of workers), most of which is in the northern Gujarat districts of Banaskantha and Sabarkantha. Migrants from the Kotra block are generally employed in unskilled employment with about 83% of them employed as unskilled laborers in agriculture and construction sectors.

== Transport ==
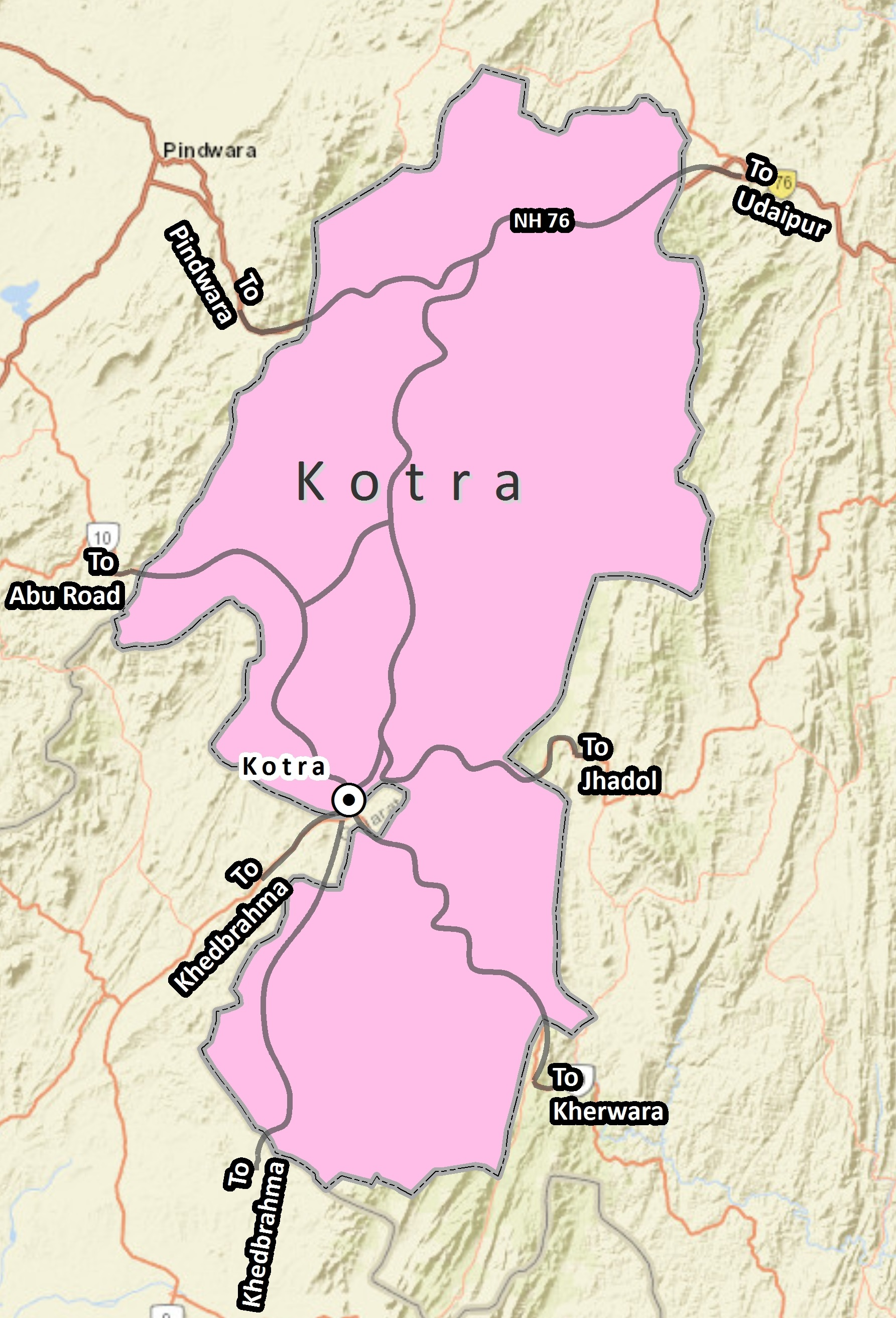
Primary Roads of Kotra Tehsil

Roads are the only mode of long-distance transport in Kotra tehsil. There is limited bus service available from Udaipur to Kotra by Rajasthan State Road Transport Corporation (RSRTC). In addition to RSRTC bus service, the tehsil is served by private taxi operators. The tehsil is not served by air or rail transportation.

== Demographics ==
=== Population ===
As of the 2011 India census, Kotda had a population of 230,532 (116,764 males and 113,768 females). The total number of households was 41,790. Males constitute 50.65 percent of the population and females make up 49.35 percent. Kotra has an average literacy rate of 24.52 percent, lower than the national average of 59.5 percent (2001 census); male literacy is 37.55 percent, and female literacy is 11.14 percent. In Kotra, for every 1,000 males there are 980 females. This sex ratio is favorable against the state's sex ratio of 922.

=== Tribal population ===
Kotra is a tribal-dominant tehsil with 220,905 persons (95.82% of population) belonging to Scheduled Tribes. Because of the large proportion of tribals in its population, Kotra tehsil in its entirety is included in the Tribal sub-plan. For the same reason, Kotra tehsil has been designated as a scheduled area which allows special protection of tribal culture and other interests.

=== Language ===
As per the 2001 Census of India, 90% of the population of Kotra tehsil speaks Mewari. However, GS Ojha reports that whereas Mewari is the primary language of the Mewar region, the language spoken in the southern and western parts of Mewar (which includes Kotra) is Vagdi. Ojha describes Vagdi as being related to Gujarati.
