= Sayala, Rajasthan =

Sayla Sayla
- City
- Location in Jalore, Rajasthan, India Sayla (India)
- Coordinates: 25.333°N 72.367°E
- Country: India
- State: Rajasthan
- District: Jalore

Government
  - Type: Nagar Palika
  - Body: Municipality Tahsil Sub District Magistrate
- Elevation: 117 m (384 ft)

Population (2011)
  - Total: 176,682

Languages
  - Official: Marwari Hindi
- Time zone: UTC+5:30 (IST)
- PIN: 343022
- Telephone code: 02977
- ISO 3166 code: RJ-IN
- Vehicle registration: RJ-16
- Sex ratio: 934 ♂/♀

Sayla is a city Municipality in the Jalore district of Rajasthan, in north-west India. It is the headquarters of Sayla Tehsil.

== Demographics ==
As of the 2001 Indian census, Sayala had a population of 12873. Males constitute 6,657 of the population and females 6,216.
