= Sumerpur =

- City
- Nickname: Textile City
- Location in India Sumerpur (India)
- Coordinates: 25.09°N 73.05°E
- Country: India
- State: Rajasthan
- District: Pali
- Tehsil: Sumerpur

Population (2011)
  - Total: 37,093

Languages
- Time zone: UTC+5:30 (IST)
- PIN: 306902
- Vehicle registration: RJ-57
- Literacy: 69.43%
- Spoken languages: Maarwari, Hindi

Sumerpur is a city in the south part of Pali District of Rajasthan state in India. Named after Maharaja Sumer Singh of Jodhpur, it came into existence in 1912 on the northern bank of Jawai river. The town is headquarters of the Sumerpur revenue subdivision and Sumerpur Tahsil. Sumerpur is an important agricultural mandi (large market) for Pali, Sirohi and Jalore districts.

== History ==
During World War 1, the British government requested the Maharaja of Jodhpur to set up a POW camp to hold Ottoman POWs. Jodhpur Maharaja agreed and POW Camp was set up in Sumerpur in 1915. When Commissioners from International Red Cross visited the Sumerpur POW camp in March 1917, there were 3366 Turkish POWs here, mostly Mesopotamian Arabs, Christians and Armenians. It was expanded later and at one point there were 9000 POWs here. There are 149 graves of Ottoman POWs still present in Sumerpur.

== Geography ==
Sumerpur is located at the western side of the state, Thar Desert, on the north bank of the Jawai River. The Jawal River is an intermittent stream that runs during monsoon season, and is a tributary to the Luni River. The Sumerpur township covers an area of 500 m².

== Demographics ==
In the 2011 India census, Sumerpur had a population of 37,093. Males constituted 52% (19,202) of the population and females 48% (17,891). Sumerpur had an average literacy rate of 68.22%, lower than the national average of 74.04%: male literacy was 77.14%, and female literacy was 58.63%. In 2011 in Sumerpur, 12% of the population was under 6 years of age.

In the 2001 India census, Sumerpur had a population of 31,482. Males constituted 52% (16,486) of the population and females 48% (14,996). Sumerpur had an average literacy rate of 60%, higher than the national average of 59.5%: male literacy was 71%, and female literacy was 47%. In 2001 in Sumerpur, 12% of the population was under 6 years of age.

== Cuisine ==
Sumerpur is known for its Rajasthani cuisine such as dal baati and various sweets such as moti pakh. It is found on most of the occasions whether it be marriage or festival.bhajiya and kachori

== Industries ==
Sumerpur is one of the biggest markets for mustard seed in Rajasthan. Cotton and chillis are exported from Sumerpur. Ghee making is a cottage industry of the town. Other major industries of Sumerpur are construction, timber, and woodwork where major suppliers include Timber Mart - which supplied wood to Kashi corridor. Sumerpur is known in Rajasthan for its ornamental ironworks, which produces articles such as iron furniture, gates and railings. Almost all the work is organised in the form of small-scale industries, whereas, automobile retailers sales a lot over the areas near the town.

== Media ==
sanatan jyotish panchang (annual publication) [8]
