= Ahore =

- City
- Location in Rajasthan, India Ahore (India) Ahore (India)
- Coordinates: 25.367°N 72.783°E
- Country: India
- State: Rajasthan
- District: Jalor
- Founder: Thakur Veridas
- Named for: Avri (आवरी)

Government
  - Type: Nagar palika
  - Body: Municipality

Area
  - Total: 1,887 km^{2} (729 sq mi)
- Elevation: 183 m (600 ft)

Population (2011)
  - Total: 239,642
  - Density: 127.0/km^{2} (328.9/sq mi)

Languages
  - Official: Hindi, Marwari
- Time zone: UTC+5:30 (IST)
- PIN: 307029
- Telephone code: +912978
- ISO 3166 code: RJ-IN
- Vehicle registration: RJ-16
- Total Villages: 136
- Sex ratio: 963 ♂/ 947♀

Ahore or Ahor (Aavar) is a city in the Jalore District of the Indian state of Rajasthan at the intersection of Sanderao-Jalore and Jalore-Jodhpur Highway.

== Ahore ==
Ahore was a Thikana of 10 villages of Rathore sub clan Champawat Rajputs. Thakur Jagannath Singh, the first Thakur of Ahore, was granted the Ahor estate in 1706 by Maharaja Ajit Singh of Marwar following the Battle of Dunada.

== Geography ==
It is located 18 km east of Jalore on NH 325 between Jalore and Sanderao. It is the headquarters of the tehsil of the same name.

This town can be found at the intersection that connects Jalore, the District Headquarters, and Jodhpur, a major city.

The Ahor tehsil has 41 Gram Panchayats. The Gram Panchayats are: Agawari, Ahore, Aipura, Ajeetpura, Bala, Bankli, Badanwari, Bavadi, Bhadrajun, Bhawrani, Bhanswara, Bhooti, Bhorda, Bithuda, Chandrai, Charali, Chavarcha, Chunda, Dayalpura, Dodiyali, Ghana, Guda Balotan, Harji, Kamdba, Kanwla, Kavarada, Nimbla, Norwa, Nosra, Padarali, Panchota, Paota, Raithal, Rama, Rodla, Sankarna, Sedria, Shankhwali, Sugalia Jodha, Thanwala, Umedpur, Valadara and Vediya.

== Demographics ==
Ahore tehsil has a population of 2,39,642 peoples, out of which urban population is 16,867 while rural population is 2,22,775 according to census in 2011.

=== Bhata Gair ===
Ahor was the site of Bhata Gair, a ceremony which, until 2004, took place during the festival of Holi. As a rule, only those born in Ahor were allowed to participate. In this ritual, people were divided into two teams, one that consumed alcohol and the other that did not, and they were separated with a fence in between. The aim was to cross the fence, and the team who crossed the fence wins. When one player attempted to cross the fence, the members of the other team would throw stones and attack the player who the player which was crossing the fence with bamboo sticks. The ceremony was ended by the administration due to its dangerous nature.
