= Sanderao =

- Rural
- Location in Rajasthan, India
- Coordinates: 25.18°N 73.10°E
- Country: India
- State: Rajasthan
- District: Pali

Population (2001)
  - Total: 18,057

Languages
  - Official: Hindi
- Time zone: UTC+5:30 (IST)
- PIN: 306708
- Telephone code: 02938
- Vehicle registration: RJ-22
- Sex ratio: 1037 ♂/♀

Sanderao is a village in Pali district of Rajasthan state in India. It lies 16 km north west of Bali town. It was founded by Yasobhadra in the tenth century. This place was governed by offshoots of Sisodia rulers of Udaipur. Today Sanderao is an important junction of many road routes of the area. The nearest railway station is Falna. Sanderao is located at important junction linking four major roads. The main important economic activity is agriculture and animal husbandry. This place is also famous for its migrant community which is spread all over country and abroad and done very well in business and trades. Sanderao Śvetāmbara Jain Tirth here is around 2,500 years old. There is a holy 5000 years old pilgrimage Nimbeshvara Mahadeva ".

== Location ==
For Sanderao the nearby railway station of Falna is 13 km away from where buses and taxis are available. The public bus – stand is 200 meters from the Famous Sanderao Rawla (Palace) and the Śvetāmbara Jain temple. Buses and cars can go up to the Rawla and temple.
