= List of villages in Jalore district =

This is a list of villages in Jalore district, Rajasthan state, western India.

According to the statistics of the census of 2011, there are 9 sub-districts, 11 towns, 8 statutory towns, 3 census town and total 1111 villages in the district.

There are some villages come under Jaswantpura tehsil in jalore district :

Ajbar, Ambatri, Bara Bhawji, Beethan, Betarna, Bhadarda, Bhootwas, Bikanwas, Chak Chandna, Chandna, Chekla, Delwara, Derdi, Dhanpura, Gola, Golana, Jawiya, Jeetpura, Jhak, Karloo, Keebla, Khanda Deol, Kodita, Kolar, Kotra, Loor, Malpura, Mandhar, Manoharji Ka Bas, Modra Ki Dhani, Munthla Kaba, Padar, Paharpura, Pawti, Phaidani, Punang Khurd, Ratpura, Rota, Shivgarh, Sindhara, Uchmat, Vishnoiyon Ka Goliya, Warka Goga

== Kalapura ==
- (डकातरा hanuman colony)
- Ahore
- Ajodar
- Akwa
- Bagoda (Vagoda)
- Bali (Vali)
- Bhanwarani
- Bhavrani
- Bhinmal
- Bhundwa (Bhandavpur) Lilana
- Dedwa
- Dhamana
- Dhansa (Dhauna)
- Dhumbadiya
- Dudhwa
- Harmoo
- Jakhal
- Jalor
- Jeewana
- Karda
- Komta
- Khara
- Lumba Ki Dhani (Lumba Ri Dhani)
- Malwara
- Mengalwa (Meghalwa)
- Mithi Beri (Mithi Veri)
- Modran
- Poshana
- Punawas
- Raniwara
- Rewatra
- Rohniwara
- Sankad
- Sankariya
- Sayla (Hayla)
- Siwara
- Surana (Hurana)
- Taliyana
- Teja Ki Beri (Teja Ri Veri)
- Vediya, Ahore

== See also ==
- Jalore District
- List of villages in India
