= Paramaras of Siwana =

Rajput dynasty

The Paramaras of Siwana were one of the many Rajput rulers in Rajasthan who ruled a principality centered on the fort of Siwana. They belonged to the Rajput Agnivanshi clan of Paramaras. The last ruler, Sitala Deva was defeated and his domain annexed in 1308 by the sultan of Delhi, Alauddin Khilji.

== History ==
At the beginning of the 14th century, the present-day Rajasthan had several small principalities centered around hill forts. One of these was Siwana, ruled by the Parmar clan of Rajputs. A number of local chiefs acknowledged their suzerainty.

=== Decline ===
Most of the Rajput principalities had acknowledged the sultan of Delhi, Alauddin Khalji's suzerainty after his conquest of the powerful Ranthambore (1301) and Chittor (1303) kingdoms. However, the forts of Siwana and Jalore, located in the south-west end of Rajasthan, remained independent. Siwana, located near the Thar Desert, was then ruled by Sitala Deva (also called "Satal Deo" or "Sital Dev" in medieval chronicles).

According to the Delhi courtier Amir Khusrau's Dawal Rani, the Delhi army had been besieging the Siwana fort for 5–6 years without success. The 15th-century poem Kanhadade Prabandha claims that on one occasion, the Jalore Chahamana ruler Kanhadadeva sent an army in Sitala Deva's aid. The joint force defeated the Delhi army, killing the invading commanders Nahar Malik and Khandadhara Bhoja.

=== Collapse ===
In 1308, Alauddin decided to personally lead an expedition to Siwana. He started his march from Delhi on 2 July 1308, and took charge of the siege operations in Siwana in August–September 1308. Eventually the Sultan's army scaled the fort walls, and defeated the defenders after a full day of battle.

== Aftermath ==
Sital Deva tried to flee to Jalor, but the Delhi soldiers ambushed and killed him on 10 November 1308. His head was later presented to Alauddin. The contemporary writer Amir Khusrau states that he was a man of huge stature, and Alauddin was astonished on seeing his giant head. The 16th-century historian Firishta incorrectly states that Sitala Deva ultimately surrendered by sending a golden statue of himself to Alauddin and asking for a pardon (which was granted). Firishta appears to have confused Sital Deva with the Kakatiya king Prataparudra.

After the conquest, Siwana was renamed Khayrabad. It was assigned to Malik Kamal al-Din 'Gurg', who later led the army that captured Jalore.

== Bibliography ==
- Banarsi Prasad Saksena (1992). "The Khaljis: Alauddin Khalji". In Mohammad Habib and Khaliq Ahmad Nizami (ed.). A Comprehensive History of India: The Delhi Sultanat (A.D. 1206-1526). Vol. 5 (Second ed.). The Indian History Congress / People's Publishing House. OCLC 31870180.
- Dasharatha Sharma (1959). Early Chauhān Dynasties. S. Chand / Motilal Banarsidass. ISBN 9780842606189. OCLC 3624414.
- Kishori Saran Lal (1950). History of the Khaljis (1290-1320). Allahabad: The Indian Press. OCLC 685167335.
- Peter Jackson (2003). The Delhi Sultanate: A Political and Military History. Cambridge University Press. ISBN 978-0-521-54329-3.
