= Siege of Siwana =

1308 siege in India

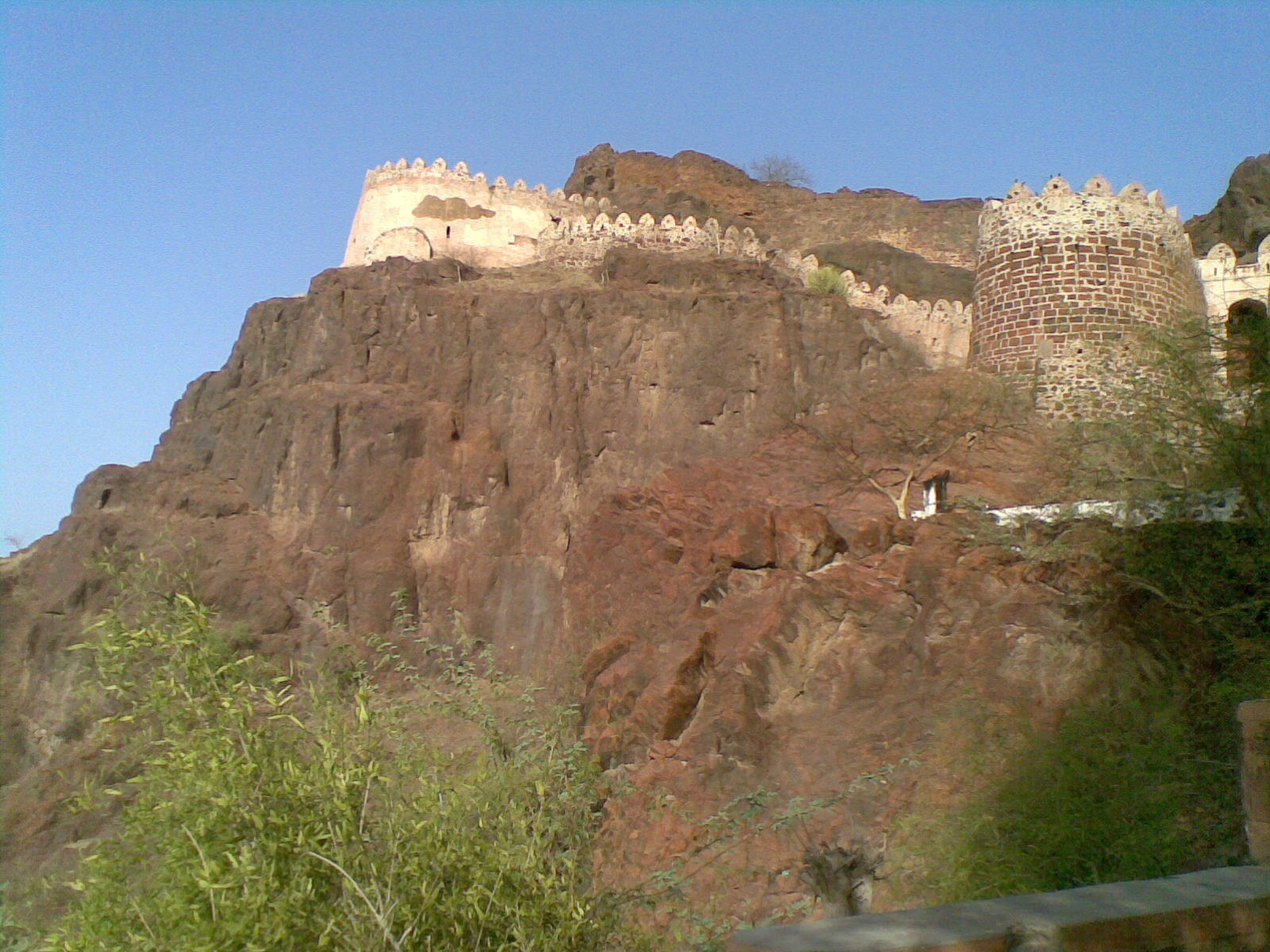
- The Siwana fortamidst the Aravali mountain ranges
Date	1308
Location	Siwana
Result	Khalji victory

Belligerents
Paramaras of Siwana	Delhi Sultanate

Commanders and leaders
Sitala Deva †	Alauddin Khalji; Kamal al-Din Gurg

Delhi and Siwana in present-day India

In 1308, the Delhi Sultanate ruler Alauddin Khalji captured the Siwana fort located in present-day Rajasthan, India.

Alauddin's forces had been besieging the fort for several past years, but had been unsuccessful in capturing it. In August–September 1308, Alauddin personally arrived from Delhi, and took charge of the operations at Siwana. The Delhi army breached the fort after a few months. Faced with a defeat, Sitala Deva, the ruler of the Siwana, tried to flee, but was captured and killed.

== Background ==
At the beginning of the 14th century, the present-day Rajasthan had several small principalities centered around hill forts. Most of these principalities had acknowledged Alauddin's suzerainty after his conquest of the powerful Ranthambore (1301) and Chittor (1303) kingdoms. However, the forts of Siwana and Jalore, located on the south-west end of Rajasthan, remained independent. Siwana, located near the Thar Desert, was controlled by a Paramara chief named Sitala Deva (also called "Satal Deo" or "Sital Dev" in medieval chronicles). A number of local chiefs acknowledged his suzerainty.

According to the Delhi courtier Amir Khusrau's Dawal Rani, the Delhi army had been besieging the Siwana fort for 5–6 years without any success. The legendary poem Kanhadade Prabandha claims that on one occasion, the Jalore Chahamana ruler Kanhadadeva sent an army in Sitala Deva's aid. The joint force defeated the Delhi army, killing the invading commanders Nahar Malik and Khandadhara Bhoja.

== Siege ==
In 1308, Alauddin decided to personally lead an expedition to Siwana. He started his march from Delhi on 2 July 1308, and took charge of the siege operations in Siwana in August–September 1308. The Delhi army surrounded the fort from all sides, with Alauddin leading the contingent stationed on the eastern side of the fort. Malik Kamal al-Din 'Gurg' (or Kamaluddin) was in-charge of the siege engines (munjaniqs).

The Delhi army tried to capture the fort using many methods, including a shower of arrows from the siege engines. For over three months, the defenders foiled their attempts, by throwing fire and stones at them. Meanwhile, the invaders had been constructing a pasheb, an inclined mound reaching up to the fort battlements. Once the mound was completed, Alauddin's army scaled the fort walls, and defeated the defenders after a full day of battle.

The Kanhadade Prabandha claims that Sitala Deva was betrayed by a bhayal soldier, with whose help Alauddin defiled the main water tank of Siwana with cows' blood. As the cows are sacred to Hindus, Siwana lost its main source of drinking water. Facing a desperate situation, the women of the fort committed jauhar (mass self-immolation), while the men decided to fight to their deaths.

Sital Deva tried to flee to Jalor, but the Delhi soldiers ambushed and killed him on 10 November 1308. His head was later presented to Alauddin. The contemporary writer Amir Khusrau states that he was a man of huge stature, and Alauddin was astonished on seeing his giant head. The 16th-century historian Firishta incorrectly states that Sitala Deva ultimately surrendered by sending a golden statue of himself to Alauddin and asking for a pardon (which was granted). Firishta appears to have confused Sital Deva with the Kakatiya king Prataparudra.

After the conquest, Siwana was renamed Khayrabad. It was assigned to Malik Kamal al-Din 'Gurg', who later led the army that captured Jalore.
