= Jalore district =

Coordinates: 25°21′00″N 72°37′12″E

- District of Rajasthan
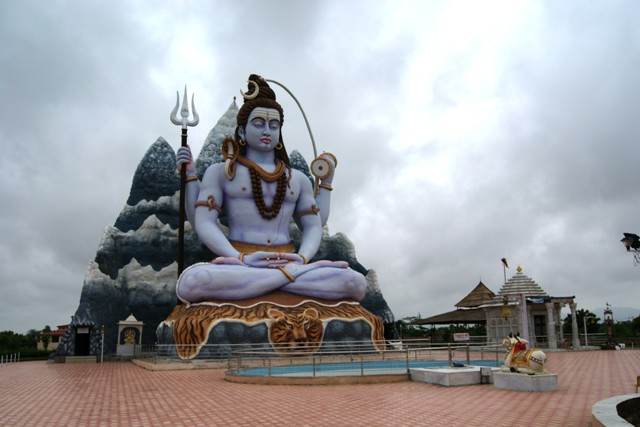
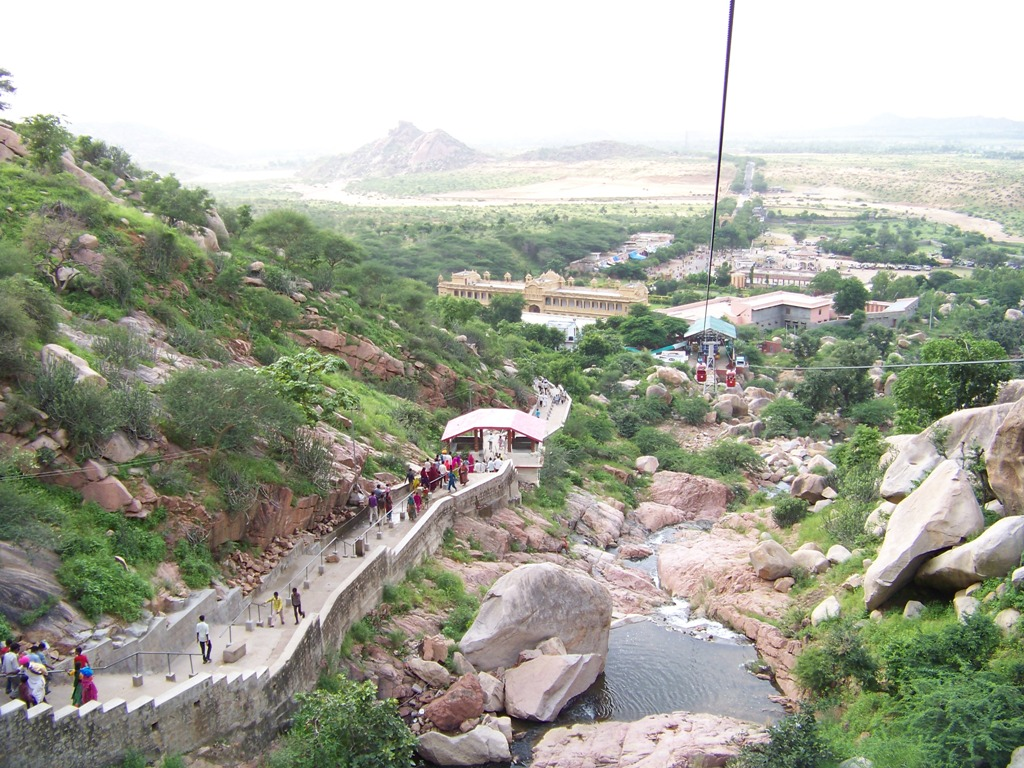
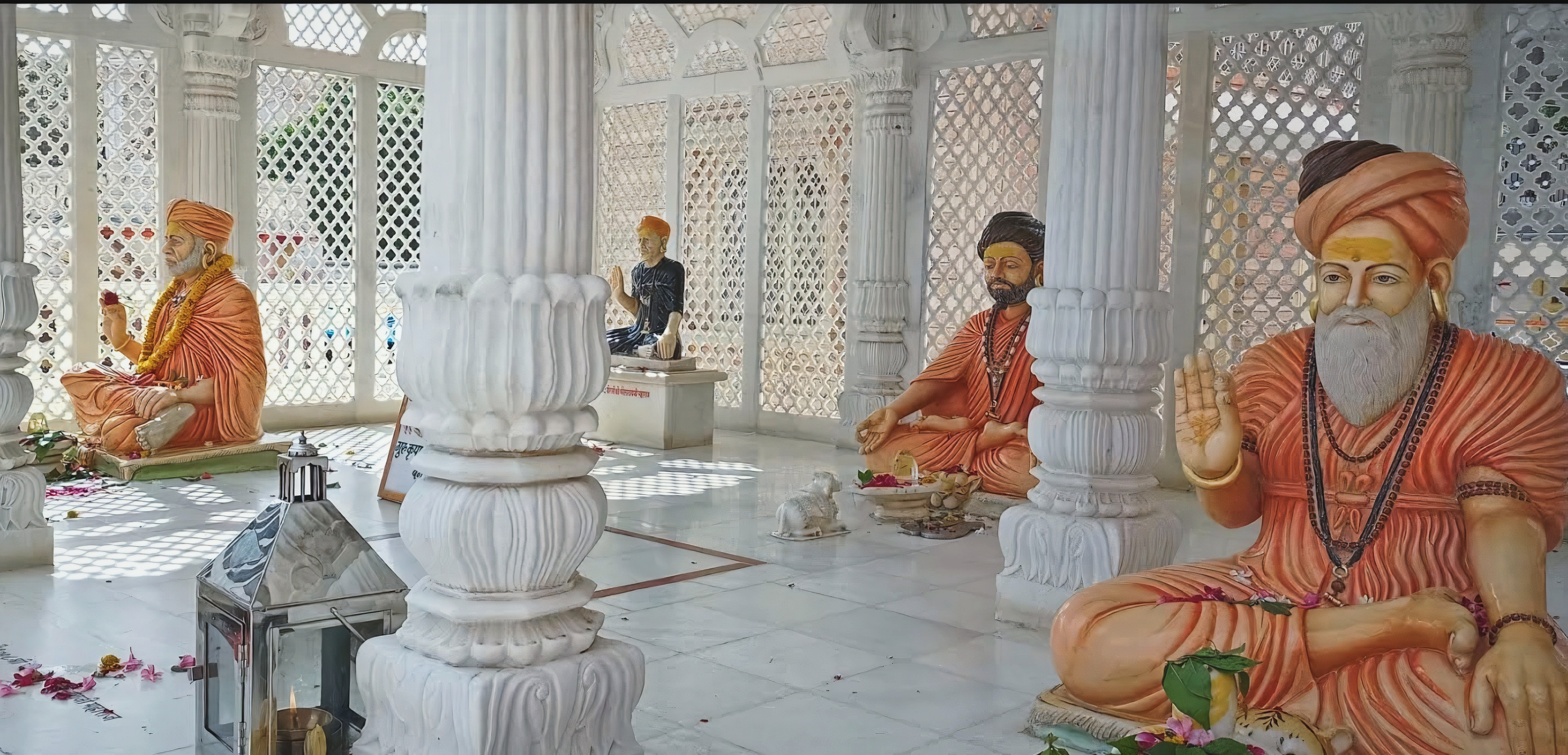
- Top: Kailash Dham Bishangarh; Middle: Sundha Mata Bhinmal; Bottom: Sire Mandir at Jalore

- Location of Jalore district in Rajasthan
- Country: India
- State: Rajasthan
- Division: Pali
- Headquarters: Jalore

Government
  - District Collector & Magistrate: Dr. Pradeep K Gawande, IAS
  - Superintendent of Police: Ghyan Chand Yadav, IPS

Area
  - Total: 10,640 km^{2} (4,110 sq mi)

Population (2011)
  - Total: 1,828,730
  - Density: 171.9/km^{2} (445.1/sq mi)
- Time zone: UTC+05:30 (IST)
- Website: Jalore District

Jalore district is a district of Rajasthan state in western India. The city of Jalore is the administrative headquarters of the district. The district has an area of 10,640 km^{2} (4,108 sq mi) (3.11 percent of Rajasthan's area), and a population of 1,828,730 (2011 census), with a population density of 136 persons per square kilometre.

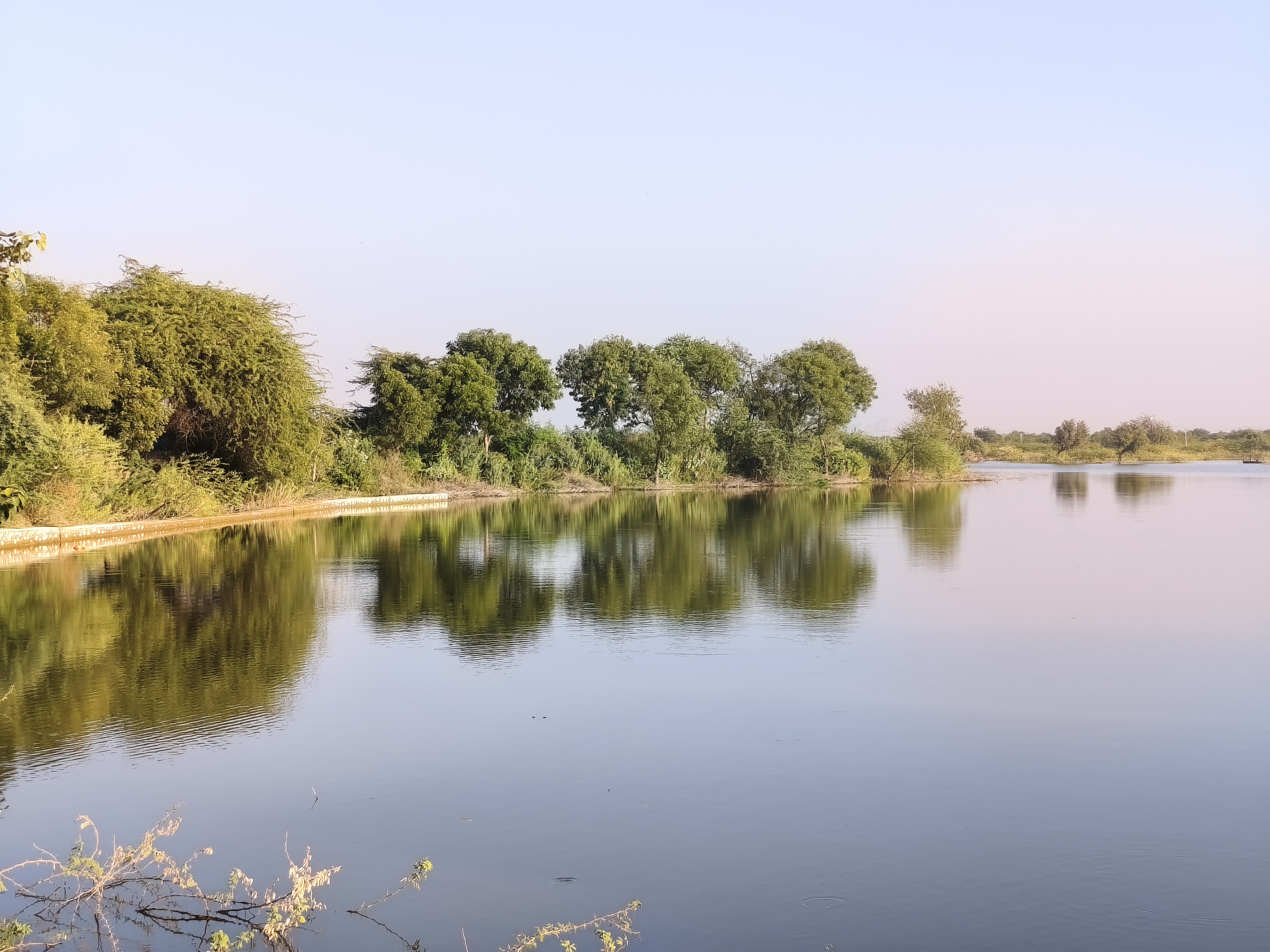
Bhanwarani Village Pond.

== History ==
In ancient times Jalore was known as Jabalipura - named after the Hindu saint Jabali. The town was also known as Suvarngiri or Songir, the Golden Mount, on which the fort stands. It was a flourishing town in the 8th century, and according to some historical sources, in the 8th-9th centuries, one branch of the pratihara empire ruled at Jablipur (Jalore). Raja Man Pratihar was ruling Bhinmal in Jalore when Parmara Emperor Vakpati Munja (972-990 CE) invaded the region — after this conquest he divided these conquered territories among his Parmara princes - his son Aranyaraj Parmar was granted Abu region, his son and his nephew Chandan Parmar, Dharnivarah Parmar was given Jalore region. This ended almost 250 years Pratihar rule over Bhinmal. Raja Man Pratihar's son Dewalsimha Pratihar was a contemporary of Abu's Raja Mahipal Parmar (1000-1014 CE). Raja Devalsimha made many attempts to free his country or to re-establish Pratihar hold onto Bhinmal but in vain .Finally he settled for the territories in Southwest of Bhinmal, comprising four hills - Dodasa, Nadwana, Kala-Pahad and Sundha. He made Lohiyana (present Jaswantpura) his capital. Hence this subclan became Dewal Pratihars. Gradually their jagir included 52 villages in and around modern Jalore district. The Dewals participated in Jalore's Chauhan Kanhaddeo's resistance against Allauddin Khilji. Thakur Dhawalsimha Dewal of Lohiyana supplied manpower to Maharana Pratap and married his daughter to the Maharana, in return Maharana gave him the title of “Rana” which has stayed with them till this day

In the 10th century, Jalore was ruled by the Paramaras. In 1181, Kirtipala, the youngest son of Alhana, the Chahamana ruler of Nadol, captured Jalore from the Paramaras and founded the Jalore line of Chauhans. His son Samarasimha succeeded him in 1182. Samarasimha was succeeded by Udayasimha, who expanded the kingdom by recapturing Nadol and Mandor from the Turks. During Udayasimha's reign, Jalore was a tributary of the Delhi Sultanate. Udayasimha was succeeded by Chachigadeva and Samantasimha. Samantasimha was succeeded by his son Kanhadadeva.

During the reign of Kanhadadeva, Jalor was attacked and captured in 1311 by the Delhi's Turkic Sultan Alauddin Khalji. Kanhadadeva and his son Viramadeva died defending Jalore.

Rathore rulers of Ratlam used the Jalore fort to safe-keep their treasure.

In the Middle Time nearly 1690 Royal Family Of Jalore Yadu Chandravanshi Bhati Rajput Of Jaisalmer came Jalore and make make their kingdom. They are also known as Nathji, Thakaro by the local people of Ummedabad. Jalore is a second capital of them the first capital was Jodhpur still chhatri of bhati sardar from royal family of Jalore ancestors exists. They ruled whole Jalore, Jodhpur in their time after Mughals they had only Ummedabad.

The Turkic rulers of Palanpur State of Gujarat briefly ruled Jalore in the 16th century and it became part of the Mughal Empire. It was restored to Marwar in 1704, and remained part of the kingdom until shortly after Indian Independence in 1947.

There are 12 Math (Big Hindu monasteries) and 13 Takiya (Masjid).

Jalore is known as the "Cradle of the Marwari horse" - an indigenous horse breed famed for its beauty, endurance and loyalty to the horsemen who fought interminable wars on horseback.

== Geography ==
The district is bounded on the northwest by Balotra District, on the northeast by Pali District, on the southeast by Sirohi District, and by Banaskantha District of Gujarat state on the southwest. The total area of the district is 10,640 km^{2} (4,108 sq mi). The altitude is 268 m, latitude is 25.22 N and longitude is 72.58 E.

Physiographically, the district is oblong in shape, extending up to Rann of Kutch (Gujarat). The region is generally plain but for some scattered thickly wooded hills in the north and some hillocks in the centre. The eastern portion of the district is rocky while the western tract is a roughly plain dotted with Sand dunes & sand ridges. In respect of its geological formation, most part of district is formed of fourth century modern century deposits. These deposits can be seen in Grid pattern formed by sand (Balu), new alluvial and old alluvial Soils. In Bhinmal Tehsil's South Eastern part of Jaswantpur, highest mountains of the district are situated. the highest peak is Sundha (991 meters, 3252 feet).Luni River is the main river in the district with its tributaries Jawai, Khari, Sukri, Bandi, and Sagi. All the rivers are seasonal.

== Administrative set-up ==
There are 10 tehsils Ahore, Sayala, Jalore, Jaswantpura, Bhadrajun Bagoda, Chitalwana, Sanchore, Raniwada and Bhinmal. Ramsin, Khasarvi and Jiwana are the 3 sub-tehsils.

Now 3 Municipalities are situated at Jalore, Sayala and Bhinmal.

The major towns and villages of the Jalore district are Sayala, Vodha, Ramsin, Daspan, Bagra, Juni Bali, Bishangarh, Ummedabad, and Megalva.

There are 767 revenue villages in the district grouped under 264 Gram Panchayat villages.

== Political ==
Jalore-Sirohi is a joint parliamentary constituency. Buta Singh won three times from this parliamentary constituency. There are five legislative assembly areas namely Jalore, Ahore, Bhinmal, Raniwara, and Sanchore. At this time, the member of parliament for Jalore-Sirohi is Lubharam Choudhary of BJP.

== Economy ==
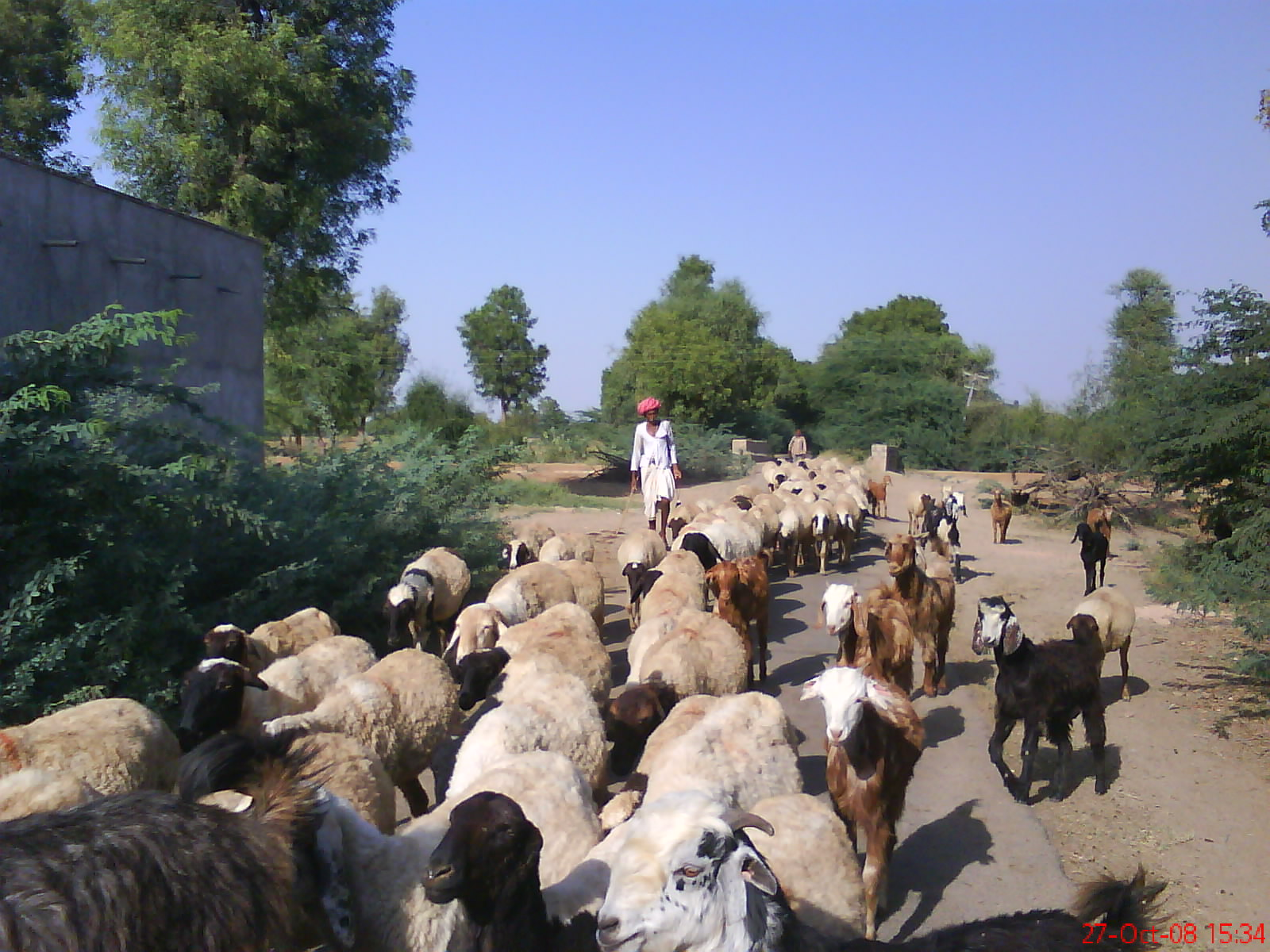
A rabari with his cattle in a village of Jalore district

The economy of district is mainly based on agriculture and animal husbandry. The oilseeds specially mustard oil seed is predominant crop. Wheat, bajra, kharif pulses, barley, jowar and in very huge quantity of fleawort.

Of late some mineral based industries are set up based on mineral available from local mines. The main minerals produced are: Gypsum, limestone, bajari, murram, granite, and graded fluorite.

There is no large and medium size industry in the district. The main small scale industries are :granite slabs and tiles, marble cutting and polishing, mustard seed crushing, skimmed milk powder, butter and ghee, handloom cloth, leather shoes (mojari). There are four industrial areas in the district.

In 2006 the Ministry of Panchayati Raj named Jalore one of the country's 250 most backward districts (out of a total of 640). It is one of the twelve districts in Rajasthan currently receiving funds from the Backward Regions Grant Fund Programme (BRGF).

== Infrastructure ==
=== Electricity ===
There are two sub grid stations of 220 KV at Jalore and Bhinmal. The district receives power from Dewari grid station in Udaipur District. Almost all villages of the district are electrified.

A small area is irrigated from water of Jawai dam. The main source of irrigation continues to be wells. Over exploitation of ground water has meant that farmers have to dig deeper. Sanchore tehsil is getting water from Narmada Canal project.

=== Transport ===
National Highway no 15 (Bhatinda-Kandla) passes through the district. The total road length in the district is about 2,800 km (1,740 mi).

The district is connected by broad gauge railway line of North Western Railway. Samadari-Bhildi branch line passes through the district connecting Jalore and Bhinmal towns. There are 15 railway stations and 127 km (79 mi) of railway line in the district. The nearest airport is Jodhpur. There is also an air strip at village Noon about 35 km (22 mi) from Jalore town.

== Demographics ==
Historical population
Year	Pop.	±% p.a.
1901	271,363	—
1911	300,374	+1.02%
1921	278,888	−0.74%
1931	322,867	+1.48%
1941	368,338	+1.33%
1951	423,553	+1.41%
1961	547,072	+2.59%
1971	667,950	+2.02%
1981	903,073	+3.06%
1991	1,142,563	+2.38%
2001	1,448,940	+2.40%
2011	1,828,730	+2.36%

Religions in Jalore District (2011)
Religion	Percent
Hinduism	94.76%
Islam	4.32%
Jainism	0.80%
Other or not stated	0.12%

According to the 2011 census Jalore district has a population of 1,828,730, roughly equal to the nation of Kosovo or the US state of Nebraska. This gives it a ranking of 260th in India (out of a total of 640). The district has a population density of 172 inhabitants per square kilometre (450/sq mi) . Its population growth rate over the decade 2001-2011 was 26.31%. Jalor has a sex ratio of 951 females for every 1000 males, and a literacy rate of 55.58%. 8.30% of the population lives in urban areas. Scheduled Castes and Scheduled Tribes make up 19.53% and 9.77% of the population respectively.

Languages of Jalore district (2011)
1. 59.4% [59.42]: Marwari (59.4%)
2. 35.8% [35.78]: Rajasthani (35.8%)
3. 1.01% [1.01]: Hindi (1.01%)
4. 3.79% [3.79]: Bhili (3.79%)

At the time of the 2011 census, 59.42% of the population spoke Marwari, 35.78% Rajasthani and 1.01% Hindi as their first language.

== Climate ==
The minimum and maximum temperatures of the district are 4 degrees and 50 degrees Celsius respectively. The average rainfall is 412 mm. The climate of district is dry and with extremes.

== Wildlife ==
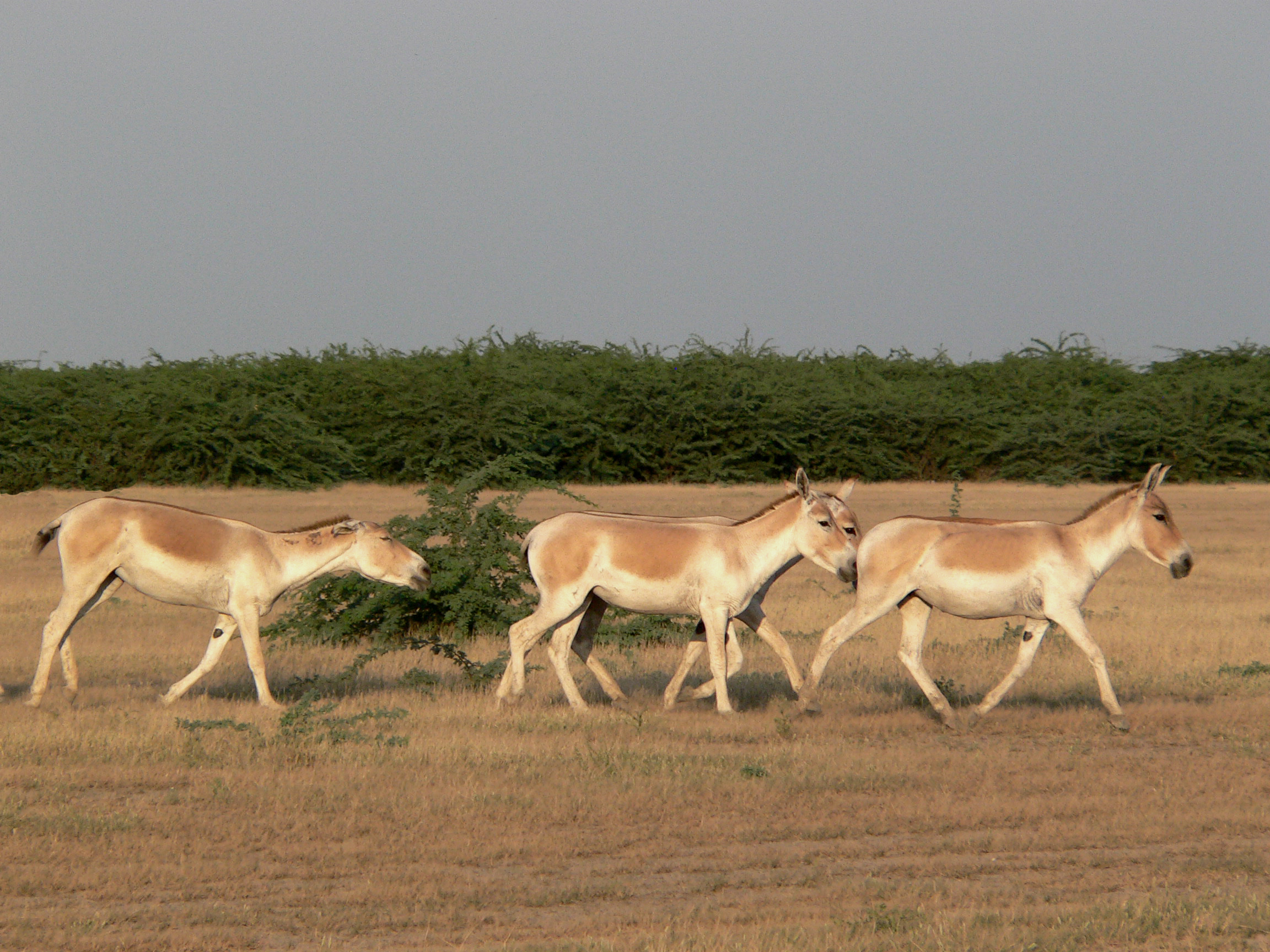
A group of female asses breaking into a run

Indian Wild Ass, a rare member of Indian Wildlife seems to be increasing in numbers and extending its range from Little Rann of Kutch in the neighbouring Indian State of Gujarat, where the world's last population of this subspecies had got confined to in recent years, and has gradually started moving out and colonising Greater Rann of Kutch also extending into the neighbouring State of Rajasthan in the bordering villages in Jalore district bordering the Rann of Kutch in Gujarat and in Khejariali and its neighbourhood where a 60 km^{2} area was transferred to the Rajasthan Forest Department by the revenue authorities in 2007. In Rankhar village a conservation reserve was established by the state government to conserve the wildlife in the area particularly Indian wild Ass. At this place Rebaris (camel and sheep breeders) live in the Prosopis juliflora jungles in the company of chinkaras, hyenas, common fox, desert cat and wolf etc.

Flora: The hillocks and ridges in the area under discussion are characterised by khair (Acacia Katechu); thar (Euphabia Nerrifolia) and babuls. The plains are vegetated by Aawal (Casia auriculate) akra, kiker (Acacia arabica). The oilseeds specially mustard oil seed is predominant crop. Wheat, bajra, kharif pulses, barley, jowar and in very huge quantity of fleawort. However, due to the scanty presence of water most of the cultivated land remains barren. Also presence of aeolian sand makes it tough for agricultural growth due its high permeability. Extensive growth of cactuses of various types is found in this area.

== Villages ==
- Bala, Jalore
- Bhanwarani

== See also ==
- Thar Desert
- Tharparkar
- Kaniwada Hanuman Temple
