= Jaswantpura =

Jaswantpura Jasparta Loyanagarh
- Tehsil
- Nickname: N/A
- Location in Rajasthan, India Jaswantpura (India)
- Coordinates: 24.8000°N 72.4667°E
- Country: India
- State: Rajasthan
- District: Jalore
- Named for: Maharaja Jaswant Singh of Jodhpur State

Government
  - Body: Bhartiya Janta Party

Area
  - Total: 3.343 km^{2} (1.291 sq mi)
- Elevation: 272 m (892 ft)

Population (2011)
  - Total: 5,111
  - Density: 1,529/km^{2} (3,960/sq mi)

Languages
  - Official: Hindi/ Rajasthani
- Time zone: UTC+5:30 (IST)
- PIN: 307515
- Telephone code: 02990
- ISO 3166 code: RJ-IN
- Vehicle registration: RJ-16
- Sex ratio: 968 ♂/♀
- Website: www.jaswantpura.weebly.com

Jaswantpura is a town and tehsil headquarters in the Jalore district of Rajasthan, India. It is the headquarters of Panchayat Samiti (block) and a part of the Jaswantpura subdivision; before 1947, it was the headquarters of the Pargana. The village was declared a tehsil in the Rajasthan budget 2012–13, and is named after the ruler of Marwar, Jodhpur: Maharaja Jaswant Singh

== History ==
Raja Mansingh Pratihara was ruling the Bhinmal, Jalore when the Parmar emperor Vakpati Munja invaded it after defeating Man Singh he divided conquered territories equally among his four sons- this event ended almost 250-year-old Pratihara rule over bhinmal Deval Singh Pratihara, son of Raja Man Pratihar, was a contemporary of King Mahipala Parmar of Abu (1000–1014 AD). King Deval Singh made several attempts to free his country or to reestablish the Pratihara hold on Bhinmal, but in vain. He settled for territories in the southwest of Bhinmal, consisting of four hills - Dodasa, Nadavana, Kala-Pahad and Sundha. He made Lohiana (present day Jaswantpura) his capital. His descendants came to be known as Dewal Rajputs Gradually, his jagir consisted of 52 villages in and around the modern Jalore district today these villages are populated by his descendants. The Loyana Garh is the capital of a thikana of 52 villages (Kalapura to Karada) of Dewal Rajputs. Malwara is the most prominent Thikana of Dewal Clan.

Legends in Padmanābha's Kanhadade Prabandha (15th century) and Nainsi ri Khyat (17th century) claim that a daughter of the Delhi Sultan Alauddin Khalji fell in love with Viramadeva ("Viramade"). The Kanhadade Prabandha names the Delhi princess as Piroja, and mentions that Alauddin offered to marry her to the Viramadeva, stating the couple had also been married in several previous births. He even visited Jalor, where he was treated well because he behaved like a Hindu. However, the Chahamana prince Viramadeva rejected the offer as an insult. leading to Alauddin's invasion of Jalore.The Deval Pratihara Rajputs of jaswantpura participated in the resistance along with Chauhan emperor Kanhadadeva and his son Viramadeva of Jalore against Alauddin Khilji.The prince was later killed in a battle.

During his struggle against the Mughal emperor Akbar, Maharana Pratap stayed in Loyana Garh for some time and married the daughter of Loyana Garh Thakur Rai Dhaval Singh Dewal. Later, Maharana Pratap gave the title of Rana to Rai Dhaval.

There was a misunderstanding between the Maharajas of Jodhpur and Loyana Garh. The Sardars of Loyana Garh rebelled against the then Maharaja Jaswant Singh of Jodhpur, who quelled the rebellion after two failed attempts. After he conquered Loyana Garh, he changed its name to Jaswantpura.

== Geography ==
Jaswantpura is located at 24.8000°N 72.4667°E. The total geographical area of the village is 334.3 hectares.

== Demographics ==
According to the 2001 census, the population of Jaswantpura was 4,399 with a male population of 2,235 and a female population of 2,164.

== Transportation ==
The Sagi River flows through the town. The nearest airport to Jaswantpura is in Udaipur. Raniwara is the nearest railway station. Most of the commuting is done via buses and rickshaws.
