= Viramadeva =

King of Javalipura in 1311

King of Javalipura
- Reign: 8–11 May 1311
- Predecessor: Kanhadadeva
- Died: 11 May 1311; Jalore
- Dynasty: Chahamanas of Jalor
- Father: Kanhadadeva

Viramadeva (died 11 May 1311) was the son of the Jalore Chahamana king Kanhadadeva. He was crowned the king of Jalore during Alauddin Khalji's invasion of Jalore, and was killed in the conflict 2½ days later.

== Legend ==
Location of Delhi and Jalore

Fictional legends in Padmanābha's Kanhadade Prabandha (15th century) and Nainsi ri Khyat (17th century) claim that a daughter of the Delhi Sultan Alauddin Khalji fell in love with Viramadeva ("Viramade"). The Kanhadade Prabandha names the Delhi princess as Piroja, and mentions that Alauddin offered to marry her to the Viramadeva, stating the couple had also been married in several previous births. However, Viramadeva rejected the offer, leading to Alauddin's invasion of Jalore. Nainsi's Khyat claims that Viramadeva temporarily stayed at the court of Delhi, where Alauddin offered to marry his daughter to the Chahamana prince. Viramadeva did not want to marry the Khalji princess, but could not openly refuse the offer. He asked for Alauddin's permission to return to Jalore, promising to return with a marriage party. When he did not return, Alauddin invaded Jalore. The legendary narrative about Piroja's love for Viramade is purely imaginary.

The Kanhadade Prabandha states that the first army sent by Alauddin besieged Jalore for 7 days, but the sorties led by Viramadeva and his uncle Maladeva foiled the invaders' attempt to capture the fort. On the 8th day, a severe thunderstorm forced the besiegers to retreat. The Jalore forces launched an eight-pronged attack on one of the retreating detachments at Moklana, with Viramadeva leading one of the Jalore contingents. The Delhi detachment's commander Shams Khan was captured along with his harem, while the rest of his soldiers fled.

After this setback, Alauddin dispatched a stronger army led by Malik Kamaluddin. According to the Kanhadade Prabandha, the Jalore contingents led by Maladeva and Viramadeva attacked the invading army on alternate days. Although they managed to slow down Kamaluddin's march, they were unable to stop his gradual advance towards Jalore. Ultimately, Viramadeva, who was stationed at Bhadrajun, was recalled to Jalore to help his father prepared for the impending siege. Maladeva was also recalled, but was re-sent to fight Kamaluddin once the invaders reached near Jalore. Sometime after besieging the fort, Kamaluddin managed to breach it with the help of a traitor named Bika. Facing a certain defeat, the defenders prepared for a last stand, and Viramadeva was crowned King. The women of the fort committed suicide by jauhar (mass self-immolation), while the men died fighting. Viramadeva is said to have died two-and-a-half days after the coronation.

The Kanhadade Prabandha states that Viramadeva's head was brought to Alauddin. It miraculously turned away when the Sultan turned towards it. Piroja immolated herself while holding his head.
