= Noon, Rajasthan =

Village in Jalor district, Rajasthan, India

Noon (नून)
- Village
- Country: India
- State: Rajasthan
- District: Jalore

Area
  - Total: 2,353.2 ha (5,815 acres)

Population (2011)
  - Total: 3,946

Noon (Village ID 89305) is a village in Jalor district in the Indian state of Rajasthan. The village is surrounded by four rivers. According to the 2011 census it has a population of 3946 living in 688 households. Its main agriculture product is jeera growing. A temple dedicated to the Hindu deity, Shiva is located there. Noon is the only village in Jalore with an aeroplane runway.
