= Dhansa =

Coordinates: 24°47′N 88°31′E

Dhansa (धानसा)
- Village
- Interactive map of Dhansa (धानसा)
- Country: India
- State: Rajasthan
- District: Jalore
- Tehsil: Jaswantpura

Area
  - Total: 7,198 ha (17,790 acres)

Population (2011)
  - Total: 7,819
- Time zone: UTC+5:30 (IST)
- PIN: 343023
- ISO 3166 code: RJ-IN
- Vehicle registration: RJ-46

Dhansa is a village in Jaswantpura Tehsil of Jalore district of Rajasthan state in India. Dhansa is a large village with total 1534 families residing. The Dhansa village has a population of 7819, of which 3797 are males and 4022 are females as per Population Census 2011. It is one of the rare villages with a better female to male ratio. The nearest railway station in Modran, Rajasthan on Samdari- Bhildi rail route.
