= Sire Mandir =

Temple in Rajasthan, India

- सिरे मंदिर
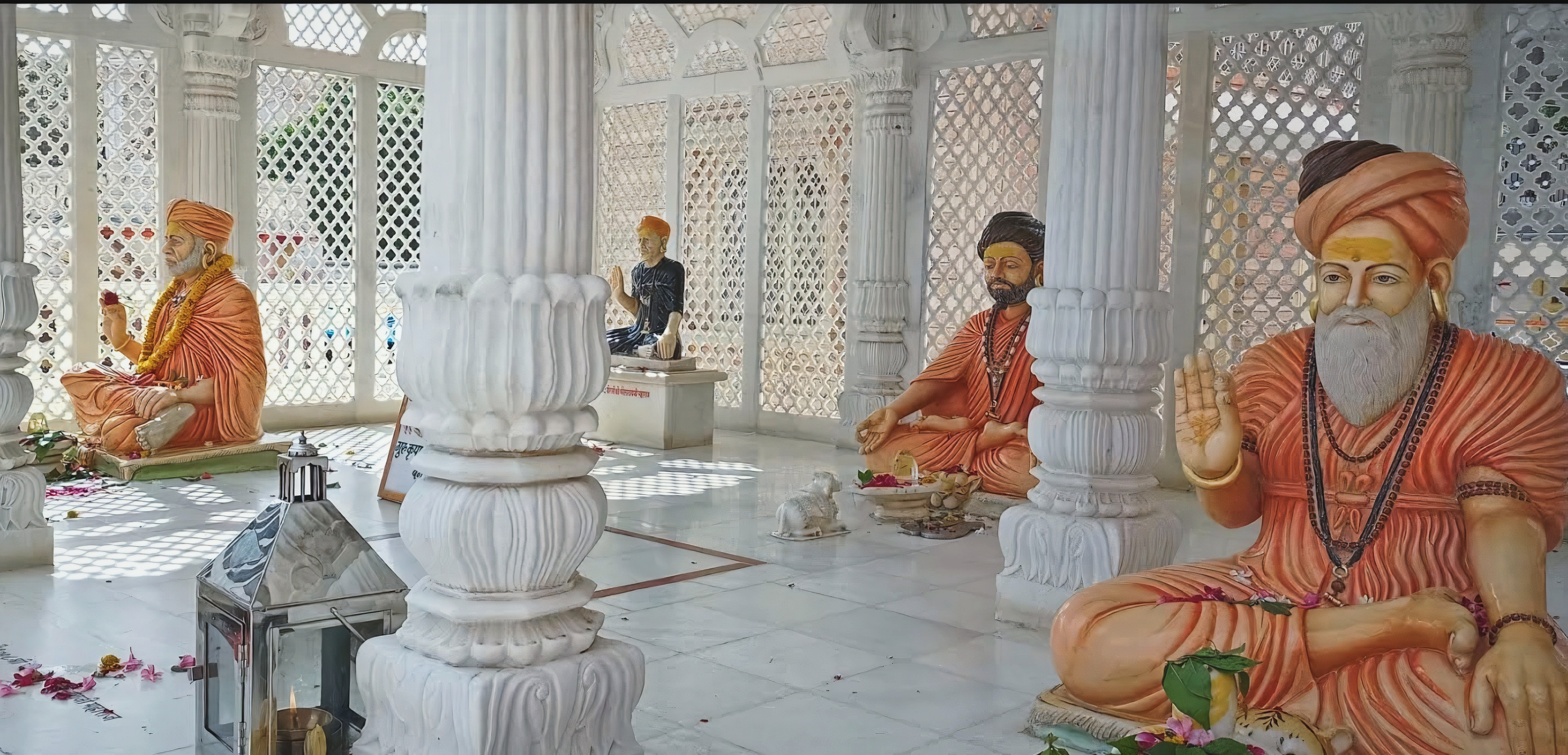
- Ideal of popular Mahant of Sire Mandir

- Location in Rajasthan Sire Mandir (India)

Religion
- Affiliation: Hinduism
- District: Jalore
- Deity: Shiva

Location
- Location: Jalore
- State: Rajasthan
- Country: India
- Coordinates: 25°19′49″N 72°35′16″E

Architecture
- Creator: Rawal Ratan Singh

Sire Mandir is a Hindu temple dedicated to the Hindu god Shiva (as a form of Jalindra Nath). It is located 646 meters above sea level on the Kanyachal hills near the Jalore Fort in Jalore city in the state of Rajasthan, India.

Many saints traveled to meditate at Sire Mandir because it is considered the sacred grove of sage Jabali. Pandavas spent some of their time here and King Bhruthhari's path leader Suanath and his disciples made it their home. There are many temples for Shiva & Shakti nearby, out of which Sire Mandir is famous for its natural environment, belief and austerity.

The road in front of the Hotel Geetco leads directly towards the Kanyachal mountain. It is only 3 km from the town. While climbing the mountain, people may find Yogiraj Jalandhar Nath Ji's footsteps’ imprints. Nearby there is a temple and one big water hut and a parking place for vehicles.

From the valley to the temple, it is only three km (1.9 mi) of climbing where stairs are made for safe climbing. In between, there is a temple of lord Hanuman and lord Ganesha.

Sire Mandir is the house of lord Shankar and was built by Raja Ratan Singh known as Ratneshwar. It is known for its vastness. Shivling is established in one rounded cave.

There is one Jhalara, a big Mansarovar, non-stop ‘Dhunna’, a Dining Hall, Palace of Raja Mansingh, two gardens and a resting place on different locations.

In the undertaking of Mahant Shri 1008 Ganganath Ji Maharaj, new construction had taken place and plantation on a mass basis happened. There is a facility of both telephone and electricity. On the other side, a water facility for tourists is available 24 hours.

In front of the Ratneshwar temple, one big elephant of cement & stone is built. Being the sacred grove of Yogi Jalandhar Nath Ji, it is also a sacred grove of Yogi Suanath, Dev Nath, Bhawani Nath, Bhairunath, Phoolnath Kesarnath and Bholenath. Jodhpur's king Mansingh also prayed here to get his kingdom back.

== History ==
Ratneshwar Temple, located on Kanyachal Mountain in Jalore, Rajasthan, is a significant site of the Nath sect. It is associated with Yogi Jalandharnath, a revered saint who is believed to have performed penance in the nearby Bhanwar Cave. Impressed by his miracles, King Ratan Singh of Jalore accepted him as his spiritual guru and built a Shiva temple in Vikram Samvat 1708 (1651 AD), now known as Ratneshwar Temple.

In 1803 AD, Man Singh, fleeing an assassination attempt by his brother Bhim Singh of Marwar, took refuge in Jalore Fort. As the fort was besieged, Yogi Ayas Devnath of the Nath sect conveyed a prophetic message that Man Singh would become the ruler if he held out until Kartik Sudi 6. Man Singh followed this advice, and coincidentally, Bhim Singh and his commander died shortly after. Man Singh was crowned the ruler of Jodhpur.

In gratitude, he renovated the Mahamandir in Jodhpur, Ratneshwar Temple, and the Nath ashram at Kanyachal, as well as Jalore Fort, honoring the Nath sect’s role in his rise to power.
