= Jalore Fort =

Fort in Jalore, Rajasthan, India

- Jalore Fort or Swanagiri Durg
- Part of Marwar Rajputana
- Jalore district, Rajasthan
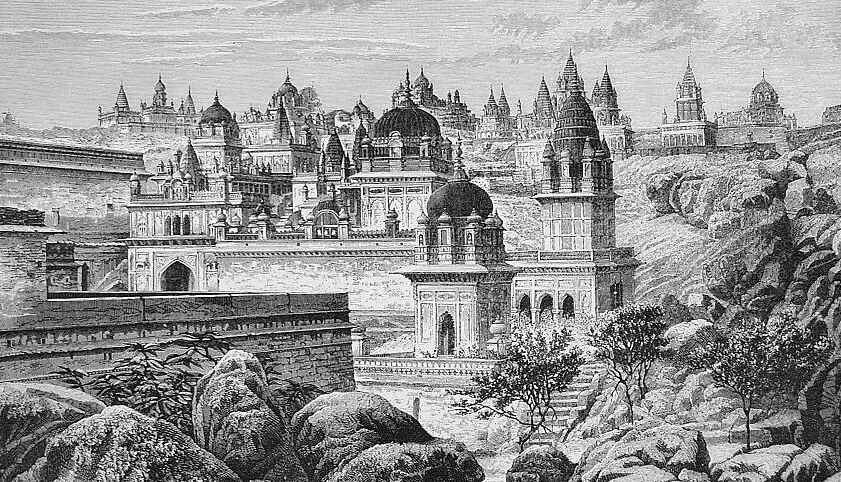
- Temples at Jalore Fort

Site information
- Type: Hill fort
- Controlled by: Management under S Parmar AND Jodhpur State
- Open to the public: Yes
- Condition: Protected Monument

Location
- Location of Jalore Fort in Rajasthan
- Coordinates: 25.3373°N 72.6144°E

Site history
- Built: 8th–10th centuries AD

Jalore Fort also known as Swarnagiri (golden mountain) is the main attraction of Jalore, a town in the Indian state of Rajasthan, and one of the nine forts of the Maru, under the Paramaras in the 10th century. It is one of the most famous and impressive forts in the state and has been known through history as the Svangiri or the "golden mount".From this fort, the Songra Chauhans defeated the Delhi Sultanate ruler Alauddin Khalji. With the blessings of Kuldevi Maa Ashapura who is also known as Modara Mata. Chauhan gave a different direction to Jalore and to the fort.

== History ==
Jalore Fort was built between the 8th and the 10th centuries by Maharaja of Parmar Rajputs, and Jalore was ruled by a Paramara branch in the 10th century.

Kirtipala, the youngest son of Alhana, ruler of Nadol, established the Jalore line of Chauhans. He captured it from the Paramaras in 1181 and took the clan name Songara after the place. His son, Samarasimha, succeeded him in 1182. After him, Udayasimha became the ruler. The rule of Udayasimha was a golden period in the history of Jalore. He was a powerful and able ruler. He ruled over a large area. He regained Nadol and Mandore from the Muslims. In 1228 Iltutmish circled Jalore; however, Udayasimha offered stiff resistance. He was succeeded by Chachigadeva and Samantasimha respectively. After Samantasimha his son Kanhadadeva became ruler of Jalore.

During the reign of Kanhadadeva, Jalore was conquered in 1311 by Alauddin Khilji, the Sultan of Delhi.

Jalore was conquered by the Rathore of Ratlam and remained a part of Jodhpur State until it integrated into India.

== Physical features ==
Jalore fort is perched atop a steep and perpendicular hill. It commands the town from rocky outcrop 336m (1200 ft) high fortified with a wall and bastions with cannon mounted upon them.

The fort has four gigantic gates; however, it is approachable only from one side, after a two-mile (3 km) long serpentine ascent. The approach to the fort is from the north, up a steep, slippery road through three rows of fortification to a single rampart wall 6.1m (20ft) high. It takes an hour to climb up. The fort is built on the lines of traditional Hindu architecture.

The main poles or gates

Built into the front wall are four mighty gates or pols that lead into the fort: The Suraj Pol, Dhruv Pol, Chand Pol and the Sire Pol. The Suraj Pol or the "Sun gate" is built so that the first rays of the morning sun enter through this gateway. It is an impressive gate with a small watch tower built over it. The Dhruv Pol is rather simple looking compared to Suraj Pol.

== Attractions inside the fort ==
The mahal or "the residential palace" inside the fort is now desolated, and what is left of it are the ruined symmetrical walls with huge rock formations around it. The cut-stone walls of the fort are still intact at many places. There are some drinking water tanks in the fort.

=== Hindu temples ===
There is an old Shiva temple, a temple devoted to Lord Shiva. It was built by Kanhaddev Ruler of Jalore. Same was renovated by Mah Singh Ruler of Jodhpur and built a Samadhi Mandir of Shri Jalandharnath. Recently this temple renovated again by Shri Santinathji Maharaj in 2005 with all facility for devotees. A triple temple dedicated to Amba Mata, Ashapuri and Hanuman ji is also located within the fort premises.

=== The Islamic mosques ===
The Kila Masjid (Fort Mosque) within the fort is also noteworthy as they demonstrate the widespread influence of the architectural decorations associated with the Gujarati styles of the period (i.e. late 16th century). This is because it was built by destroying existing Hindu temple.

Another shrine in the fort is that of Saint Rehmad Ali Baba. Near the main gate, there is the tomb of Malik Shah, a noted Mohammedan saint.

=== The Jain temples ===
Jalore is also a place of pilgrimage for Jains and the famous Jain temples of Adinath, Mahavira, Parshvnath and Shantinath are located here.

The oldest temple is that of Adinath, which existed as far back as in the 8th century. The mandapa was subsequently built in 1182 A.D. by Yasovira, a Srimali vaishya. The temple stands out the most among the dark fort walls and rocky surrounding. Built in white marble this imposing structure is quite a sight.

The temple of Parsvanath was built by the ruler of Jalore and then rebuilt in 1785 A.D. This temple has a spectacular toran or an archway and a golden "cupola" in the hall meant for theatre performances. Built near the Bal Pol, which is situated northwest of the fort.

The temple of Mahavira was also known as Chandanavihara Nahadarao, named after a Pratihara ruler and a hero of Jain tradition who built it in the 14th century.

The temples of Santinatha and the Ashtapads are believed to have existed in the 13th century.
