= Bala, Jalore =

Bala
- Village
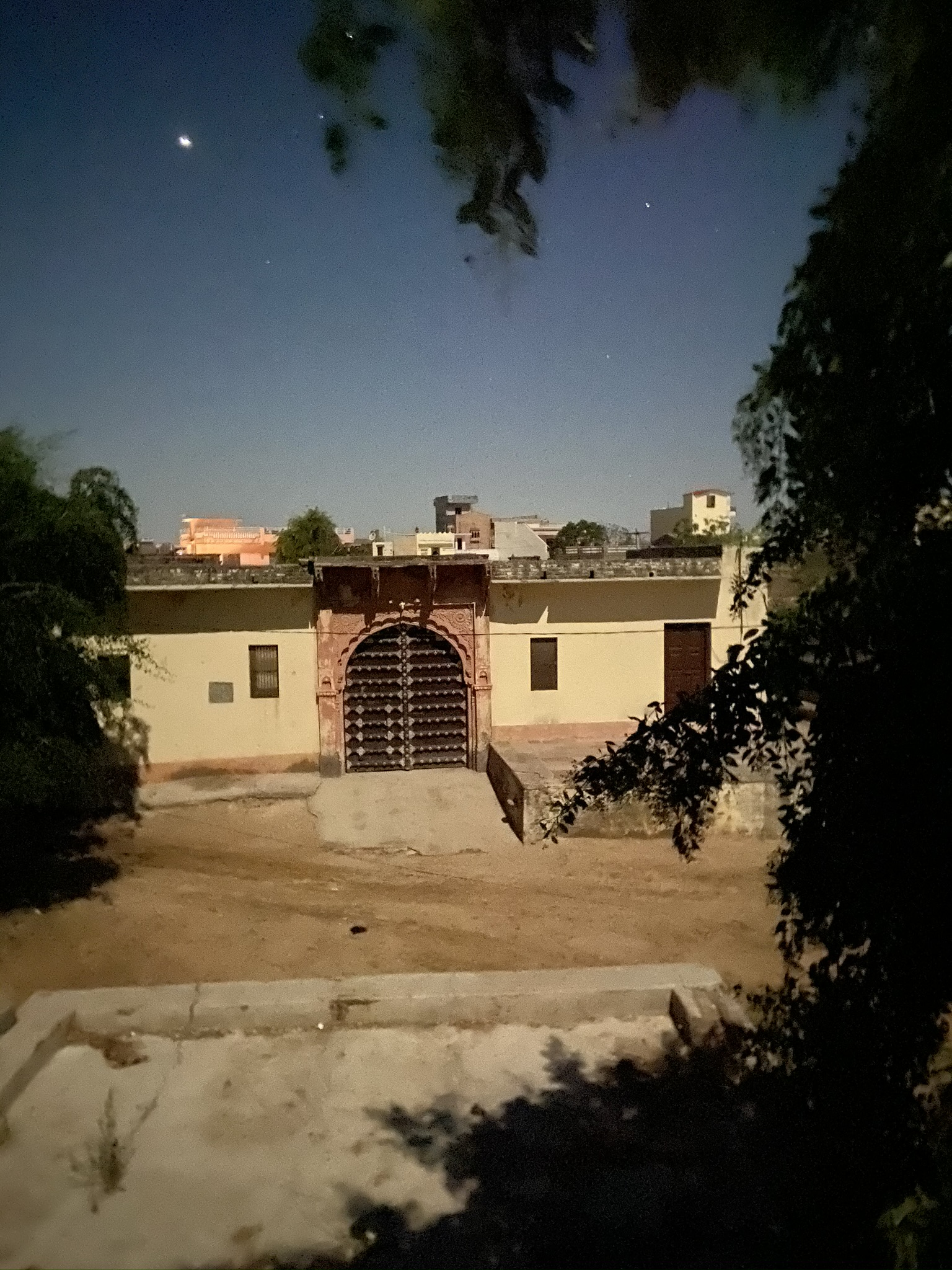

- Location in Rajasthan, India Bala (India) Bala (India)
- Coordinates: 25.6225748°N 72.7562804°E
- State: Rajasthan
- District: Jalor
- Established: 16th Century
- Founder: Rathores of Jodhpur State

Government
  - Body: Panchayati raj (India)
- Elevation: 163 m (535 ft)

Population (2011)
  - Total: 4,264

Languages
  - Official: Hindi, Marwari
- PIN: 02978
- ISO 3166 code: RJ-IN
- Vehicle registration: RJ-16
- Sex ratio: 1056♂/♀

Bala is a village and a Gram Panchayat in the Ahore Tehsil of Jalore district of Rajasthan in northwest India.

== Geography ==
Bala is located in Ahor, Tehsil in the Jalore district of Rajasthan. It has an average elevation of 163 m (535 ft). It is located 38 kilometers north of the district headquarters in Jalore, 27 kilometers from Ahore and 394 kilometers from the state capital, Jaipur.

== Demographics ==
According to a 2011 census, the population of Bala is 4,264. At the time of the census, there were 2,074 men and 2,190 women. Children ages 0 to 6 make up 14.66 percent of the total population. The average sex ratio of Bala village is 1,056, which is higher than the Rajasthan state average of 928. The sex ratio among children is 959 which is higher than the Rajasthan average of 888.

Bala village has a lower literacy rate than that of the Rajasthan's average. In 2011, the literacy rate of Bala village was 58.97 percent, compared to 66.11 percent of Rajasthan. In Bala, literacy stands at 71.17 percent among men and 47.61 percent among women.

=== Lineage and wars ===
The first to rule from Bala was Raja Ratan Singh, son of Rao Maldeo (also known as Chandra Sen).

Maldeo of Jodhpur (also known as Maldeo Rathore), father of Ratan Singh, soon after becoming King of Marwar, launched war campaigns and successfully defeated the Sindhals and annexed Bhadrajun.

In 1543, Ratan Singh fought at Giri-Sumel against the invading army of Sher Shah Suri (the first ruler of Suri Dynasty), the then Emperor of India. He also fought a second battle at Merata, when he suffered injuries and was subsequently defeated by Viram Deo.

In 1563–64, the Rathores lost their capital city of Jodhpur to Pathan Malik, a commander of the Mughal Emperor Akbar, but they retained their territory around Bhadrajun. During this war, they could not sustain their army's needs as adequate provisions were not available inside the fort. Also, there was no help forthcoming from outside powers. Maldev Rathore abandoned the fort and reached Bhadarajun and remained there for seven years.
