= Kamal al-Din Gurg =

Afghan General of the Delhi Sultanate

Malik Kamāl al-Dīn "Gurg" or Kamaluddin-e Gurg (Persian: کمال الدین گرگ; died late 1315 or early 1316), was a general of the Delhi Sultanate ruler Alauddin Khalji. He played an important role in Alauddin's conquest of the Siwana (1308) and Jalore (1311) forts. After Alauddin's death, he was sent by Malik Kafur to suppress a revolt in Gujarat, where he was killed.

Delhi, Siwana, and Jalore

== Early life ==
Kamal al-Din (also transliterated as Kamaluddin) belonged to a family that originated from Kabul in present-day Afghanistan. He was known as "Gurg" ("the wolf").

== Military conquests ==
After other generals of Alauddin failed to capture the Siwana fort in the preceding years, in 1308, he personally led an expedition to Siwana. Kamal al-Din accompanied Alauddin in this campaign, and held charge of the siege engines (munjaniqs). After the Delhi army captured the fort, it was renamed Khayrabad, and assigned to Kamal al-Din.

In 1311, Alauddin sent an army to capture Siwana's neighbour Jalore. After his other generals failed to capture the fort, he dispatched Kamal al-Din to conquer it. Kamalauddin captured the fort after a siege that resulted in the deaths of the defending ruler Kanhadadeva and his son Viramadeva. After this victory, Kamal al-Din held the iqta' of Jalor.

== Last days ==
During the last days of Alauddin's reign, Kamal al-Din allied with Alauddin's slave-general Malik Kafur, who held the executive power during Alauddin's sickness. The two men were probably part of a group of non-Khalaj officers that tried to seize power from the Khalaj establishment of the Sultanate. According to the chronicler Yahya bin Ahmad Sirhindi, in 1315, Kamal al-Din participated in Malik Kafur's murder of Alp Khan, an influential rival nobleman, the governor of Gujarat and Alauddin's brother in-law. Alp Khan had been accused of conspiring to kill Alauddin, but this might have been Kafur's propaganda.

The news of Alp Khan's murder led to a revolt in Gujarat, and Kafur sent Kamal al-Din to suppress the revolt. Kamal al-Din was killed in late 1315 or early 1316 in Gujarat, during a military operation. His son Taj al-Din Hushang (or Hoshang) inherited the 'iqta of Jalor, and later served as the muqta (provincial governor) of Hansi.
