= Sankariya =

- Village
- Country: India
- State: Rajasthan
- District: Jalore

Population (2011)
  - Total: 1,309

Languages
  - Official: Marwari language & Hindi
- Time zone: UTC+5:30 (IST)
- Postal code: 343027

Sankariya is a small village in the Jalore district in Rajasthan, India. There are 3 wards in the village. Sankariya has a total population of 1,309 peoples according to Census 2011.
