= Vediya, Ahore =

Village in Rajasthan, India

Coordinates: 25°29′26″N 72°43′06″E

Vediya
- Gram Panchayat
- Vedia (वेडिया)
- Interactive map of Vediya
- Country: India
- State: Rajasthan
- District: Jalore
- Tehsil: Ahore

Area
  - Total: 1,805.15 ha (4,460.6 acres)

Population (2011)
  - Total: 1,987
  - Density: 110.1/km^{2} (285.1/sq mi)
- Time zone: UTC+5:30 (IST)
- PIN: 307029

Vediya or Vedia is a village and Gram Panchayat in Ahore tehsil of Jalore District of Rajasthan state in India. It is situated 18 km (11 mi) away from sub-district headquarter Ahore (tehsildar office) and 20 km (12 mi) away from district headquarter Jalore. Vediya has a total population of 1,987 peoples according to Census 2011.
