= Dedwa =

- village
- Location in Rajasthan, India Dedwa (India)
- Coordinates: 24.8617351°N 71.7607749°E
- Country: India
- State: Rajasthan
- Division: Jodhpur
- District: Jalore

Population (2011)
  - Total: 1,940

Languages
  - Official: Hindi
- Time zone: UTC+5:30 (IST)
- PIN: 343041
- Vehicle registration: RJ- 46
- Nearest city: Sanchore
- Lok Sabha constituency: Jalore-Sirohi
- Vidhan Sabha constituency: Sanchore
- Gram Panchayat: Jakhal
- Website: Facebook

Dedwa or Dedva is a village in the Indian state of Rajasthan.

== Geography ==
It is located on NH 68 road (formerly NH 15), 12 km (7.5 mi) north from district headquarter Sanchore and 540 km (340 mi) from the state capital Jaipur.

== Culture ==
Guru Jambheshwar, Sathari, a Shiv temple, a Bangrwa Sati Dadi temple and many other small temples and other places: P. Dhani Dedwa Bus Stand, RajVeer White House Dedwa and Engineer Palace are there.

== Education ==
Three schools operate in the village. One is a Govt secondary school and the rest are private: New Aadrash Vidhya Mandir Dedwa and Sarvodaya Vidhya Mandir Dedwa.

== Demographics ==
Dedwa village had a 2011 population of 1,940 of which 1010 are males while 930 are females. 339 families reside there. 1,043 people are literate. The population of children aged 0–6 is 289.

Dedwa village is administrated by a sarpanch (head of village) who is an elected representative of the village.

Most of the population of Dedwa is Bishnois, almost every 10th Bishnoi is a government employee.

== Transport ==
National Highway 15 connects Pathankot to Kandla via Dedwa. MR Bus, Bajarang Bus, Jakhar Bus service along with Rajasthan State Road Transport Corporation runs regular service to destinations in Rajasthan, Gujarat and Maharashtra states. Dedwa has one bus stand.
