= Bhandavapur =

Śvetāmbara Jain temple in Rajasthan, India

Bhandavpur Jain Tirth
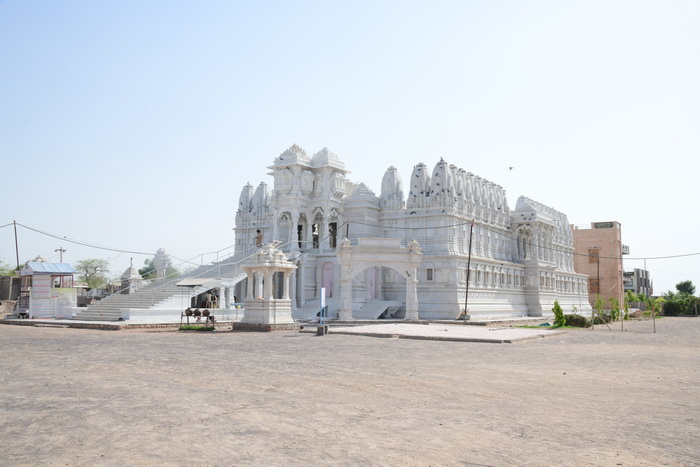
- Bhandavapur Jain temple

- Location within Rajasthan

Religion
- Affiliation: Jainism
- Sect: Śvetāmbara
- Deity: Mahavira
- Festival: Mahavir Jayanti
- Governing body: Shri Mahaveer Shwetambar Pedhi

Location
- Location: Bhundwa, Jalore, Rajasthan, India
- Coordinates: 25.006890°N 72.267663°E

Architecture
- Completed: 1176 AD
- Temple: 3

Website
- www.bhandavpur.com

Bhandavpur Jain Tirth is a Jain temple and pilgrimage site in Bhundwa village, near Bhinmal in Jalore district of Rajasthan, India.

== Inscriptions ==
It seems to be an ancient tirth place as per inscription. The idol established on Margshirsh Shukla Saptami of 756 CE (VS 813) was re-established in the temple on Marrgshirsh Shukla 5 of 1176 CE (VS 1233). A description of its establishment on Poush Shukla 9 of 1283 CE (VS 1340) is also found. The statue of lord Mahvira is believed to be 2300 years old.

== Architecture ==
Bhandavpur Jain Tirth is a large double-storied structure. The upper part of façade is a pyramidal structure with elaborate carvings and sculptures. The temple features a life size sculpture of an elephant with riders on each side of entrance. The pillars inside the temple are highly ornate.
