= Bishangarh =

- बिशनगढ़
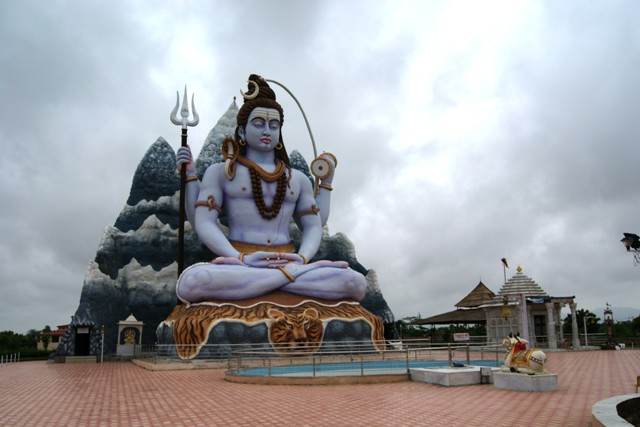
- Kailash Dham, Bishangarh
- Nickname: Twin City of Jalore
- Location within Rajasthan Location within India
- Coordinates: 25.44°N 72.56°E
- Country: India
- State: Rajasthan
- Division: Pali
- District: Jalore
- Sub-district: Bishangarh

Government
  - Type: Municipal Council
  - Body: Bishangarh Nagar Palika (Gram Panchayat)
  - Member of Parliament: Devji Patel (BJP)
  - Member of Legislative Assembly: Jogeshwar Garg (BJP)
  - Collector & DM: Indian Administrative Service
- Elevation: 148.38 m (486.8 ft)

Population (2021 Census)
  - Total: 10,000+
- Demonym: Marwari

Languages
  - Official: Marwari, Hindi, English
- Time zone: UTC+5:30 (IST)
- PIN: 343042
- Vehicle registration: RJ-16
- Nearest city: Jalore
- Lok Sabha constituency: Jalore
- Vidhan Sabha constituency: Jalore

Bishangarh is a village in the Indian state of Rajasthan. It is the twin city of Jalore. It was historically part of the Kingdom of Marwar, which is now part of Rajasthan. Bishangarh is expected to become the administrative headquarters of the Bishangarh Tehsil, including more than 26 villages and towns.

== Geography ==
According to Census 2011 information Bishangarh is located in Jalore district in Rajasthan, Bharat. It is situated 16 km away from Jalore, which is district headquarter of Bishangarh. As per 2009 stats, Bishangarh was also a gram panchayat.

The total geographical area of Bishangarh is 1979.07 hectares. Bishangarh has a total population of 4,074 peoples, out of which male population is 2,039+ while female population is 2,035+. Literacy rate of Bishangarh is 54.37% out of which 65.87% males and 42.85% females are literate. There are about 716+ houses in Bishangarh. Pincode of Bishangarh locality is 343042.

Jalore is nearest town to Bishangarh for all major economic activities, which is approximately 16 km away.
