= Kanhadade Prabandha =

1455 book by Indian poet Padmanābha

- Author: Padmanābha
- Language: Old Rajasthani
- Published: 1455
- Publication place: India

Kānhaḍade Prabandha is a book by Indian poet Padmanābha written in 1455, in a western Apabhramsha dialect. The book tells the story of Raval Kanhadade (Kanhadadeva), the Chahamana ruler of Jalore.

== Textual history ==
Padmanabha wrote Kanhadade Prabandha in 1455, in a western Apabhramsha dialect. The author was a court-poet of Akhairaja, the Chauhan Rajput king of Visalnagar. Akahiraja is said to be a descendant of the poem's hero Raval Kanhadade, through Viramade, Megalde, Ambaraja, and Khetsi.

The German Indologist Georg Bühler was the first modern scholar to write about this treatise. He noticed its manuscript in a Jain library at Tharad.

Kanhadade Prabandha has been praised as the finest work in Dingal (literary form of the Old Western Rajasthani or Old Gujarati), and one of the greatest Indian works written during the medieval period by eminent scholars like Muni Jinavijaya, K. M. Munshi, Dasharatha Sharma and K.B. Vyas.

The work was translated into English by V. S. Bhatnagar, a professor of History at the University of Rajasthan, Jaipur.

== Plot ==
At the beginning of the text, Padmanabha invokes Ganesha and Sarasvati to grant him the ability to recount Kanhadade's story. He extolls the Sonagiri Chauhan lineage and their capital city of Jalore.

=== Ulugh Khan's raid of Gujarat ===
The author then describes the conquest of Gujarat by the Alauddin Khalji, the Muslim ruler of the Delhi Sultanate: Gujarat was ruled by the Baghela king Rao Karnade. One day, Rao Karande humiliated his favorite minister Madhava, killed Madhava's brother Keshava, and abducted Madhava's wife. Madhava swore revenge and instigated Alauddin Khalji to invade Gujarat.

Alauddin agreed to Madhava's plan and started planning an invasion of Gujarat. He sent envoys to all the kingdoms lying on the route connecting Delhi and Gujarat, requesting a safe passage for his army. Kanhadade of Jalore was the only king who refused to oblige to this request. He declared that allowing the Delhi army to pass through his kingdom would be against dharma because it would result in devastation of villages, enslavement of women, looting, and torture of cows and Brahmanas.

Nevertheless, Alauddin's general Ulugh Khan marched to Gujarat with a huge army. The only Rajput who offered him any resistance in Gujarat was the Modasa chief Batada, who was defeated. Karnade, the king of Gujarat, fled his capital, following which the Muslim invaders destroyed the city's temples and converted them into mosques. Ulugh Khan then sacked Somnath, where all the priests died trying to prevent him from desecrating the city's Shiva temple. Ulugh Khan returned to Delhi with the Somnath lingam, which was to be smashed in Delhi in order to prove the superiority of Islam.

=== Kanhadade's victory over Ulugh Khan ===
Next, the poet describes how Kanhadade recovered the Somnath lingam: The goddess Parvati appeared in Kanhadade's dream, urging him to rescue the lingam, as Ulugh Khan's army passed through his kingdom. Kanhadade sent his spies to Gujarat, and learned that Ulugh Khan's army was one of the grandest armies ever, and had taken hundreds of thousands of Hindus as slaves. Kanhadade gathered all the chiefs from the neighbouring principalities, and attacked the invaders (who are described as asuras or demons). With the blessings of the goddess Ashapuri, Kanhadade and his brother Maladeo defeated the Muslims, recovered the Somnath lingam, and captured Ulugh Khan's nobles Sadullah Khan and Sih Malik.

Kanhadade venerated the rescued lingam, and installed its five pieces at Soratha, Lohasing in Vagada, Abu hill, Saivadi, and a newly built temple at Jalore. This act made the god Shiva present throughout Kanhadade's kingdom.

=== Invasion of Sivana ===
Padmanabha next describes the Siege of Siwana (Sivana): When Ulugh Khan's defeated army reached Delhi, Alauddin sent an army led by his generals Nahar Malik and Bhoja to invade Kanhadade's kingdom. The army besieged the fort of Sivana, which was held by Satala. Satala defeated the invaders, killing Nahar Malik and Bhoja.

Alauddin then personally led an army that besieged Sivana. One day, the goddess Ashapuri appeared in Kanhadade's dream, and showed him the invaders' camp. There, Satala saw Alauddin in form of the god Rudra-Shiva, and therefore, decided not to strike a blow against him. Facing a certain defeat, the women of Sivana committed suicide by self-immolation (jauhar), while the men fought to their death.

=== Furuzan's love for Viramade ===
The narrative of the poem now moves from war to love: After a skirmish between the armies of Delhi and Jalore, Alauddin decided to march to Jalore. His daughter Furuzan (also called Piroja or Sitai) told him that Kanhadade was the tenth incarnation of the god Vishnu, and would kill him if he tried to invade Jalore.

Furuzan then expressed her desire to be married to Kanhadade's son Viramade. Alauddin tried to dissuade her, offering to marry her to any Muslim prince (Khan) of Yogininagar (Delhi). But Piroza declared that she would either marry Viramade or die. Alauddin yielded to her demand, and sent his envoy to Jalore with a marriage proposal and a huge dowry that included the wealthy Gujarat province and 560 million of gold and silver coins. However, Viramade mocked Alauddin for trying to subjugate Jalore through a marital alliance rather than military might. He refused Alauddin's offer, declaring that his marriage to a Turkic woman would shame all the 36 Rajput clans and disgrace his ancestor Chachigadeva.

Upon receiving Viramade's reply, Alauddin launched an invasion of Jalore. Kanhadade ordered the city of Jalore to be decorated so that Alauddin could see the grandeur and the might of his kingdom. The bastions of Jalore were decorated with silk sheets, the canopies were studded with jewels and pearls, the towers were adorned with golden spires, and the city was lighted with earthen lamps. The royal palaces and temples were whitewashed and decorated with beautiful wall paintings. Music, dance and theatre events were organized in the city. When Alauddin reached Jalore, he marveled at the heavenly city.

Alaudin's first attack on Jalore was unsuccessful: Kanhadade's army captured the invading general Shams Khan and his wife, who was a sister of Furuzan. Princess Furuzan then told Alauddin that Viramade was her husband in her previous births, and insisted that she could secure the release of the captives by telling Viramade about their relationship in their previous births. Furuzan then described their five previous births, in which she had committed sati after her husband's death. She stated that in the sixth previous birth, Viramade had been born as Prithviraja, while she had been born as Padmavati. In this particular birth, she had committed two sins. First, she had killed a cow and conjured magical incantations to usurp power from her husband, which made him deranged. Second, she had usurped the power after ordering killings of all the ministers. After Prithviraja's death at the hands of Shihab al-din, Padmavati had committed sati in Ayodhya. Because of this act of punya (good deed), she had been born in Alauddin's royal family. However, because of her two sins, she had been born in a Turkic family.

Furuzan then visited Kanhadade's kingdom, where she was received with great respect, courtesy and hospitality. However, Viramade even refused to look at her, and she accepted this as her fate because of the sins she had committed in her sixth previous birth. She managed to secure the release of Shams Khan and her sister.

=== Defeat of Kanhadade ===
Padmanabha then describes Alauddin's final invasion of Jalore: Alauddin conquered Jalore using treachery in 1311. Kanhade died in the battle, and women of the fort commit suicide by jauhar. Princess Furuzan had sent her nurse Dada Sanavar to save Viramade, if possible, or alternatively, to bring his head as a relic. Dada Sanavar found Viramade's body, put his head in a basket of flowers, and brought it to Delhi.

When Viramade's head was presented before Furuzan in a plate, she remarked that earlier, Viramade had vowed not to even look at her face, but today, he would have to break his vow. However, the moment she came in front of Viramade's face, the head turned away. A sad Furuzan wept, and finally committed sati on the banks of the Yamuna River, holding Viramade's head in her hand.

The poem concludes with a genealogy of Viramade's descendants.

== Historical value ==
The poem contains authentic descriptions of the contemporary groups (such as Rajputs, Brahmins and Muslims), beliefs, festivals, social life, weapons and war strategies. However, its narrative about Piroja's love for Viramade is purely imaginary.
