= Daspan =

- village
- Interactive map of Daspan
- Coordinates: 25.1584°N 72.2444°E
- Country: India
- State: Rajasthan
- District: Jalore district

Population (2021)
  - Total: 12,615

Languages
  - Official: Hindi
- Time zone: UTC+5:30 (IST)
- PIN: 343029
- Vehicle registration: RJ-46
- Nearest city: Bhinmal
- Lok Sabha constituency: Jalore
- Vidhan Sabha constituency: Bhinmal

Daspan is a village in the Bhinmal tehsil of Jalore district of Rajasthan state in India. It is 24 km west of Bhinmal. The place is known for the heritage hotel Castle Durjan Niwas.

Castle Durjan Niwas is a small but beautiful fortress palace built in the early 19th century by the Rathore Champawat clan of Marwar. Many changes and additions were made into the old fortress and present structure is just a shadow of the original. The building was originally built in the Indo-European style of architecture with separate parts for ladies and gents.
