= Rewatra =

The village of Rewatra is located in the Jalore district of Rajasthan, India.It belongs to Jodhpur Division . It is located 24 km towards west from District headquarters Jalore. 15 km from Sayla. 448 km from State capital Jaipur.
