= Alauddin Khalji's conquest of Jalore =

1311 battle in Rajasthan

Siege of Jalore
Date	1311 – 11 May 1311
Location	Jalore
Result	Khalji victory

Belligerents
Delhi Sultanate	Chahamanas of Jalor

Commanders and leaders
Alauddin Khalji; Kamal al-Din Gurg	Kanhadadeva †; Viramadeva †

Delhi and Jalore in present-day India

In 1311 Delhi Sultanate ruler Alauddin Khalji dispatched an army to capture the Jalore Fort in present-day Rajasthan, India. Jalore was ruled by the Chahamana ruler Kanhadadeva, whose armies had earlier fought several skirmishes with the Delhi forces, especially since Alauddin's conquest of the neighboring Siwana fort.

Kanhadadeva's army achieved some initial successes against the invaders, but the Jalore fort ultimately fell to an army led by Alauddin's general Malik Kamal al-Din. Kanhadadeva and his son Viramadeva were killed, thus ending the Chahamana dynasty of Jalore.

== Background ==
The kingdom of Jalore was ruled by a branch of the Chahamanas. In 1291-92 Alauddin's predecessor Jalaluddin Khalji invaded Jalore, but was forced to retreat after the Vaghelas came to the rescue of the Jalore king Samantasimha.

From at least 1296–1305, Samantasimha's son and successor Kanhadadeva jointly ran the administration with his father. During this period, in 1299, Alauddin dispatched an army to Gujarat, and defeated the Vaghelas. During the army's return to Delhi, some of its soldiers staged an unsuccessful mutiny. The 17th-century chronicler Nainsi states that the Jalore army supported this mutiny, although this is doubtful.

=== Cause of invasion ===
The 16th-century chronicler Firishta claims that Kanhadadeva ("Nahar Deo") accepted Alauddin's suzerainty around 1305. Some years later Kanhadadeva heard Alauddin boasting that no Hindu ruler could challenge him. This rekindled Kanhadadeva's sense of pride, and he decided to attack Alauddin, resulting in an invasion of Jalore. This narrative is also repeated by 17th-century historian Hajiuddabir.

According to legends in Padmanābha's Kanhadade Prabandha (15th century) and Nainsi ri Khyat (17th century), one of Alauddin's daughters fell in love with Kanhadadeva's son Virama. However, Virama did not want to marry a Turkic girl, which led to tensions between the two kingdoms, and ultimately resulted in Alauddin's invasion of Jalore.

According to K.S. Lal, these reasons of invasion given by Nainsi, Firishta and Hajiuddabir are not convincing. By 1310 Alauddin had subjugated the kingdoms surrounding Jalore, including Gujarat, Malwa, Chittor, Ranthambore and Siwana. It appears that he attacked Jalore simply because he wanted to put an end to Jalore's independent status.

== Initial skirmishes ==
Alauddin's courtier Amir Khusrau states that after conquering Siwana, Alauddin returned to Delhi, ordering his generals to subjugate other parts of the Marwar region. According to Jinaprabha Suri's Vividha Tirtha Kalpa, the Delhi army desecrated a Mahavira temple at Satyapura (modern Sanchor) in 1310. The 15th-century epic romance Kanhadade Prabandha, which presents Kanhadadeva as a hero, states that Alauddin's forces also captured and sacked Barmer and Bhinmal. At Bhinmal the invaders took away a large number of Brahmins as captives.

According to Kanhadadeva Prabandha, these disturbances prompted Kanhadadeva to dispatch an army to counter the Delhi forces. This army was led by Devada chiefs Jaita and Mahipa, who were supported by three other generals: Lakhana Sevata (or Sebhata), Salha Sobhita and Ajayasi Molhana. Kanhadadeva's army defeated one of the Delhi contingents left behind by Alauddin and recovered the plunder that the invaders had obtained during their raids of Bhinmal, Satyapura and other places. After this victory, Jaita and Mahipa returned to Jalore with the war spoils. The three other generals remained near the battlefield with a portion of the army, and celebrated the new moon day (Amavasya) by taking their armor off and bathing in a river. During these celebrations they started beating a drum captured from the Delhi army. The drum was heard by Delhi Gen. Malik Naib, who was leading another contingent on a hunting expedition. Assuming that the drum beats were a summon for him, Malik Naib rushed to the battlefield. His army inflicted a crushing defeat upon Kanhadadeva's remaining forces. The Kanhadade Prabandha states that the defenders lost 4,000 soldiers, including the three generals, in this battle.

== Siege of Jalore ==
After the initial setbacks faced by the Delhi forces, Alauddin sent an army to launch a direct attack on Jalore. According to the Kanhadade Prabandha, the Delhi forces made several attempts to breach the fort during the first seven days of the ensuing siege. However, these attacks were foiled by sorties led by Kanhadadeva's brother Maladeva and his son Viramadeva. On the eighth day a severe thunderstorm forced the besiegers to retreat. The Jalore forces launched an eight-pronged attack on one of the retreating detachments at Moklana. The eight Jalore generals who led this attack were Maladeva, Viramadeva, Ananta Sisodia, Jaita Vaghela, Jaita Devada, Lunakarna Malhana, Jayamala and Sahajapala. The detachment's commander Shams Khan was captured along with his harem, while the rest of his soldiers fled.

The 16th-century chronicler Firishta claims that the Delhi army was commanded by Alauddin's concubine Gul Bihisht. During the war she died after a short illness. After her death the army was led by her son Shahin, who was killed in a battle soon after his mother's death. Firishta's claim is dubious, as it is not found in any contemporary accounts. Moreover, it seems absurd that Alauddin appointed a concubine as the commander of his army or that his soldiers would accept this appointment. The story of Gul Bihisht appears to be a late invention, designed to cover up the disgraceful retreat of the Delhi army. Firishta also inaccurately dates the invasion of Jalore to 1308 instead of 1311.

=== Kamal al-Din's attack ===
Next, Alauddin dispatched a stronger army led by Malik Kamal al-Din Gurg, one of his best generals. The Kanhadade Prabandha mentions that Kanhadadeva sent two contingents to check the advance of Kamal al-Din. One of these contingents was commanded by Maladeva and was stationed at Vadi. The other was led by Viramadeva and was stationed at Bhadrajun. The two contingents engaged the Delhi army on alternate days, leading to heavy losses on both sides. They managed to slow down the Delhi army but were unable to prevent Kamal al-Din's gradual advance towards Jalore. Ultimately, Kanhadadeva decided to recall both his contingents to Jalore for consultation. When Kamal al-Din got close to Jalore, Maladeva was sent to fight him while Viramadeva stayed behind to help his father prepare for the impending siege.

Kamal al-Din besieged the fort and tried to impose a blockade, most likely intending to starve the defenders. According to Kanhadade Prabandha, this strategy was thwarted by timely rains and cooperation from money lenders (mahajans) who helped replenish the fort's stores. The text also suggests that Maladeva briefly harassed Kamal al-Din's forces, but an army dispatched by Alauddin forced Maladeva's forces to retreat to Vandara. Another Jalore contingent led by Lunakarna destroyed an enemy outpost at Udalapura, a suburb of Jalore, defeating Malik Nizamuddin.

The Kanhadade Prabandha as well as Nainsi ri Khyat attribute the fall of Jalore to treachery by a Dahiya Rajput named Bika. After the invaders promised to make Bika the new ruler of Jalore, he led them to an unfrequented and unprotected entrance to the fort. When Bika's wife Hiradevi learned about his betrayal, she killed him and reported the matter to Kanhadadeva. However, by this time the defenders were no longer in a position to achieve a victory. Consequently, the men of the fort prepared for a last stand, and Kanhadadeva's son Viramadeva was crowned king. The women decided to die in jauhar (mass suicide by self-immolation). The Kanhadade Prabandha states that 1584 jauhar fires were lit in Jalore. Women of all castes died in this fire, including Kanhadadeva's queens Jaitalde, Bhavalde, Umade and Kamalade. The Delhi forces breached the fort, and thousands of Kanhadadeva's soldiers died in the ensuing fighting. Several of his samantas (feudal chiefs) were also killed in the battle, including Kandhala, Kanha Uhcha, Jaita Devada, Lunakarna Malhana, Arjuna, and Jaita Vaghela.

According to the Kanhadade Prabandha, after breaching the fort the invaders took five days to reach the temple of Kanhasvami inside it. When they threatened to destroy the temple, Kanhadadeva and the last 50 of his surviving soldiers died defending it. Nainsi ri Khyat suggests that many people believed that Kanhadadeva managed to survive and disappeared. His son Viramadeva is said to have died about three days after his coronation.

== Aftermath ==
Alauddin commissioned a mosque on the fort premises to commemorate this victory. Jalore remained under Muslim rule well into the Tughluq era. It was later captured by the Rathores of Marwar.
