= Jaabaali =

Jaabaali Maharshi (also known as Jabali Rishi) was a Hindu saint and philosopher. There are many saints and philosophers with the same name in Puranas.

== Jabalis in history ==
=== Jabali of the Jabali Upanishad ===
In the Jabali Upanishad, Jabali tells the Pasupata philosophy about Jiva ("pasu") and Tsa (Pasupati).

Jabali wrote "Jabala Upanishad" ", and the story of Satyakama Jabali from Samaveda-Chandogyopanishad. It explains the true form of “maatri” devata, the duties a woman has to perform before she takes up the seat of “maatri” devata. It involves the relationship between the three forms or bodies of mother and child (gross, subtle and causal). It covers the true form of satya and how satya is the first step for attaining “Brahma Vidya”. It also covers the true form of “gotra”.

This is an excerpt of Jabali literature explaining one of the duties a woman has to perform before she takes up the seat of "maatri" devata:

Jaabali lived in a small shack of sticks and straws - a menage of crocks and clay-pot, where one earned out of hands and ate out of bracts. She threw a few twigs of firewood under the three stones and blew hard on them to kindle the fire. Then, she put a pail of water on the stove for heating. Those blasted twigs - they would burn, and go out quickly, belching smoke. The smoke would rise and spread everywhere. It would reach her eyes, and hurt them. So, she sat near the stove, she reflected. She had to keep on putting in the twigs of sorrow, just to keep alive. Only then could she expect a little warmth of happiness, and a flame of hope to rise. At times, sorrows and anguish wouldn't budge off from her neck, like the wet twigs - no matter how hard she blew upon them, the fire would fail to rise. It brought a dizziness to her mind, and tears to her eyes. The whole future seemed to plunge into darkness.

=== Jabali of Jalore ===
There was also a Jabali of Jalore, Rajasthan, of whom little is known. The city Jalore used to be known as Jabalipura.

=== Jabali of Valad ===
There is an idol of Jabali in the village of Valad (or Balad), which is said to have been founded by his daughter Bala.
