= Bhanwarani =

Village in Rajasthan, India

Bhawrani
- Village
- Bhavrani
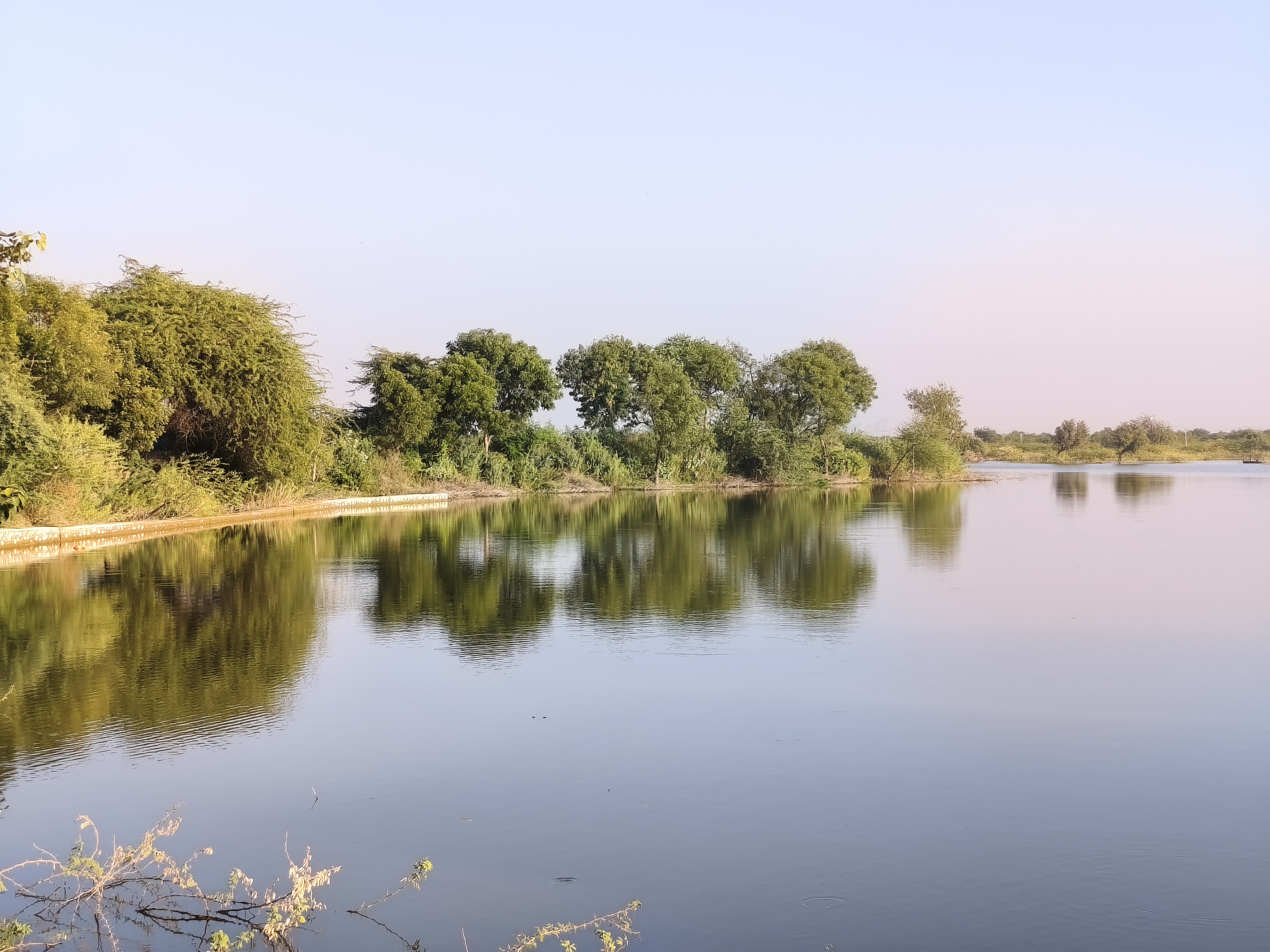
- Bhawrani Village Pond

- Location in Rajasthan, India Bhawrani (India) Bhawrani (India)
- Coordinates: 25.5635748°N 72.6562804°E
- State: Rajasthan
- District: Jalor
- Established: 16th Century
- Founder: Rathores of Jodhpur State

Government
  - Body: Panchayati raj (India)
- Elevation: 162 m (531 ft)

Population (2011)
  - Total: 7,181

Languages
  - Official: Hindi, Marwari
- PIN: 343042
- Telephone code: 02978
- ISO 3166 code: RJ-IN
- Vehicle registration: RJ-16
- Sex ratio: 938♂/♀

Bhawrani is a village in Jalore district of Rajasthan state, India.Bhanwarani has located at the foothills of Swarnagiri Mountain just 140 Km from Jodhpur and 340 Km from Ahmedabad.

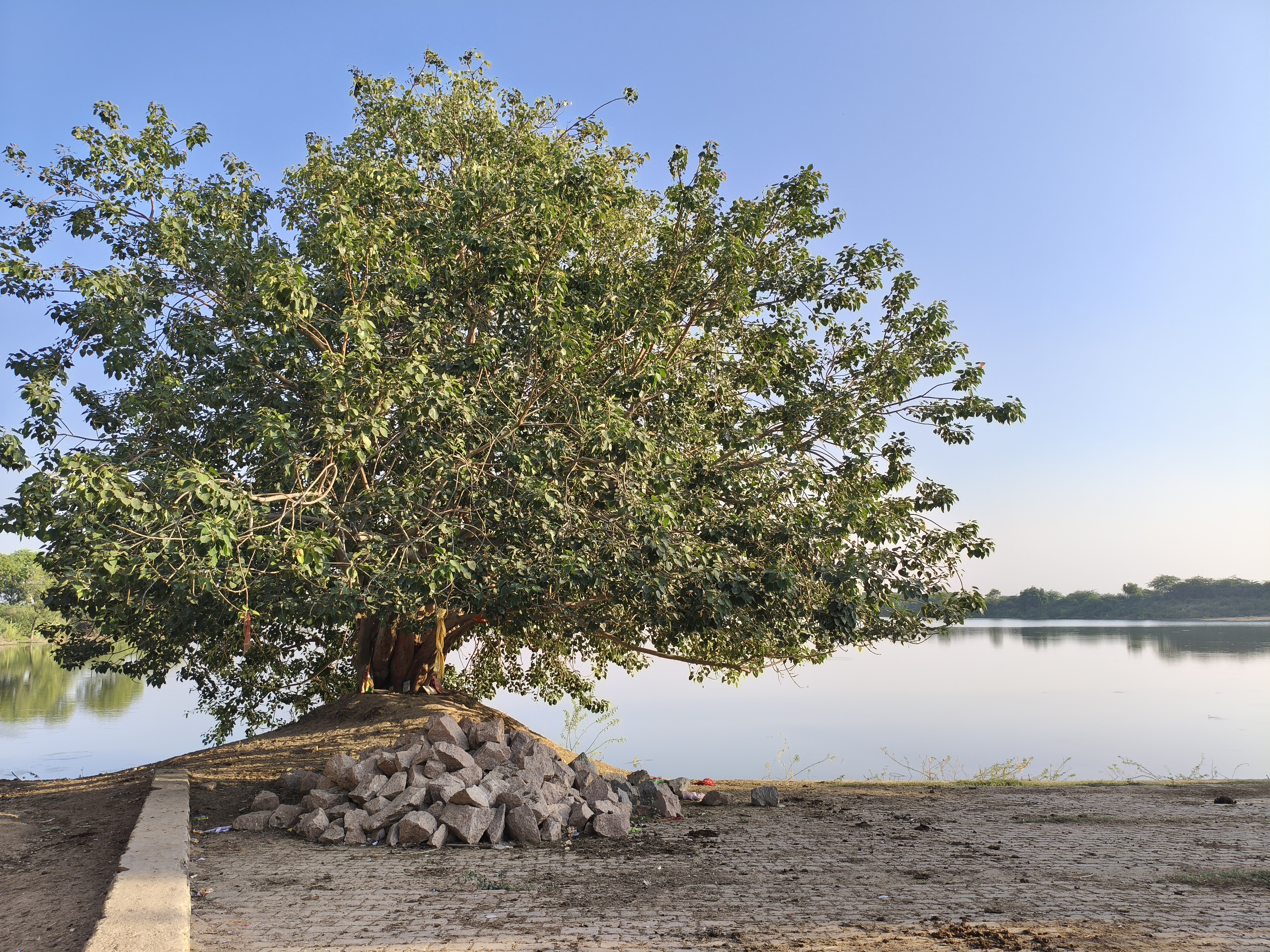
Bhawrani Village Pond.

== History ==
The village of Bhawrani was founded by the Mandlawat Rathore clan of Marwar Kingdom(Jodhpur) around 300 years ago. It is a village located around the KOAT Bhavrani which is one of the oldest buildings. This is the home to the Thakur of Bhavrani (Thakur Pradyumna singh ji). The Kota Bhavrani holds and outstanding heritage architecture dating back to the 17th Century. It often hosts foreign travelers travelling from Jaisalmer to Udaipur or from Jodhpur to Udaipur. It's a horse riding safari destination in Rajasthan. The village is surrounded by two lakes that act as a feeding ground for Demosile Cranes which come to this region flying over from the Himalayas. It takes 2 hours to reach from Jodhpur, approx 3 and a half hour drive from Udaipur and 6 hr from Jaisalmer.

== Demographics ==
Bhawrani Local Language is Marwari (Rajasthani). Bhavrani Village Total population is 7181 and number of houses are 1404. Female Population is 51.6%. Village literacy rate is 44.5% and the Female Literacy rate is 15.8%.
