= Chachigadeva =

King of Javalipura from 1257 to 1282

- Maharajadhiraja

King of Javalipura
- Reign: c. 1257–1282
- Predecessor: Udayasimha
- Successor: Samantasimha
- Dynasty: Chahamanas of Jalor
- Father: Udayasimha

Chachiga-deva (IAST: Cācigadeva, r. c. 1257–1282) was a king belonging to the Chahamana dynasty, who ruled the area around Javalipura (present-day Jalore in Rajasthan). He maintained the borders of his ancestral kingdom intact, and achieved military successes against some neighbouring princes. He is most notable for issuing the Sundha Hill prashasti inscription, which provides historically valuable information about his ancestors.

== Background ==
Chachigadeva was the eldest son of his predecessor Udayasimha and queen Prahaladava-devi. According to the 1284 Budhatra (Jodhpur) inscription of his daughter Rupadevi, he was also known as "Chacha".

Several inscriptions from Chachigadeva's reign have been discovered. These include:

- 1262 Sundha Hill inscription: notable for containing an account of the Chahamana rulers of Javalipura and their ancestors in Naddula
- 1266 Jalore inscription
- 1269 Sewari inscription (issued at Kareda)
- 1276 Ratanpur inscription
- Four Bhinmal inscriptions: 1271, 1274, 1277, and 1278

The inscriptions usually give his title as Maharajadhiraja ("king of great kings") or Maharajakula. The Ratanpur inscription describes him as a Mahamandeshvara-raja. According to the 1274 Bhinmal inscription, his title was "Rajadhiraja" (king of kings); the 1277 inscription gives his title as "Maharajakula".

Jakha or Jakahadeva was the prime minister of Chachigadeva, as attested by the 1266 Jalore and the 1276 Ratanpur inscriptions.

== Military career ==
Chachigadeva appears to have maintain a sovereign status and the territory inherited from his father. The Sundha Hill inscription poetically describes him as "destroying the roaring Gurjara lord Virama, hating the enemy Salya, taking exquisite delight in felling the shaking (or leaping) Pātaka, depriving of his colour Sanga, and a thunderbolt to the mountain - the furious Nahara".

Virama can be identified with the Vaghela prince Virama-deva, who was married to Chachigadeva's sister. Virama and his brother Visala-deva both wanted the Vaghela throne after the death of their father. The Vaghela minister Vastupala supported Visala, because of which Virama was forced to flee the Vaghela kingdom. Virama took shelter with his in-laws, but the Chahamanas wanted to maintain good relations with the Vaghelas. Therefore, Chachigadeva treacherously murdered Virama. This event probably happened while Chachigadeva was still a prince.

Salya was probably Salha, a ruler of the Chahamana branch of Sanchore and a distant cousin of Chachigadeva. Their fourth-generation ancestors - Kirtipala and Vijayasimha - were brothers. Sanchore is known to have been controlled by Chachigadeva's father Udayasimha. It is possible that Salha tried to assert his sovereignty, because of which he and Chachigadeva became enemies.

Patuka has been identified as Pratapa-simha of Abu by Dasharatha Sharma. D. R. Bhandarkar, on the other hand, identified him as a cousin of Chachigadeva (a son of Udayasimha's brother Manavasimha).

Bhandarkar identified Sanga Sangana, a ruler of Vanthali, by Bhandarkar. Dasharatha Sharma opposes this theory, arguing that Chachigadeva was a child at the time of Sangana's death.

Nahara, according to Sharma, might have been a Muslim general.

== Personal life ==
According to the 1284 inscription, Chachigadeva's wife was Lakshmi-devi. The couple had a daughter named Rupa-devi, who married the king Teja-simha (possibly a Guhila ruler, according to G. H. Ojha). According to the 17th century chronicle Nainsi ri Khyat, Chachigadeva had three sons: Samantasimha (his successor), Chahadadeva, and Chandra.

Chachigadeva's successor was Samantasimha, who was probably his son, although the relationship between these two persons is not certain.

== Cultural activities ==
The Sundha Hill inscription states that Chachigadeva waived some taxes at Shrimala (Bhinmal). At Ramasainya (modern Ramseen), he donated funds for the temple of the deity Vigrahaditya. For the temple of the gold Aparajitesha, he commissioned a golden cupola, a silver girdle, a hall, a ratha studded with precious stones, and a flag staff. He worshipped the goddess Aghateshvari (Chamunda) at Sugandhadri (modern Sundha Hill), and commissioned a mandapa at her temple.

He also patronized Jainism: he granted a village to a Parshvanatha shrine at Karaheda. The Sundha Hill prashasti (eulogy) of his family was composed by a Jain yati (monk).
