= Samarasimha =

King of Javalipura from 1182 to 1204

- Maharaja

King of Javalipura
- Reign: c. 1182–1204 CE
- Predecessor: Kirtipala
- Successor: Udayasimha
- Issue: Udayasimha
- Dynasty: Chahamanas of Jalor
- Father: Kirtipala

Samara-simha (IAST: Samarasiṃha, r. c. 1182–1204 CE) was an Indian king belonging to the Chahamana dynasty of Javalipura (present-day Jalore in Rajasthan). He ruled the area around Jalore as a Chaulukya feudatory.

== Reign ==
Samarasimha succeeded his father Kirtipala on the Chahamana throne of Javalipura. He had two brothers named Lakhanapala and Abhayapala, and a sister named Rudala-devi. In his inscriptions, he is styled as "Maharaja Samarasimha-deva".

Samarasimha's 1182 CE Jalor stone inscription states that he "held in scorn" the nomadic tribes of Pilavahika (identified with modern Peelwa near Parbatsar). According to historian Dasharatha Sharma, this is a reference to his successful expeditions against the bandits of Pilavahika.

The 1182 CE inscription mentions that Samarasimha's maternal uncle Jojala was a Rajya-Chintaka during his reign. This suggests that Jojala looked after the administration of the kingdom.

== Public works ==
The 1185 Jalor inscription from Samarasimha's reign records the construction of a temple called Kuvara-Vihara. The temple was originally built by the Chaulukya monarch Kumarapala in the Kanchanagiri fort of Javalipura, in 1221 VS (1164-65 CE). It was rebuilt by Bhandari Yashovira in 1242 VS (1285-86 CE), on Samarasimha's orders. The original temple structure had been burnt by the Shakambhari Chahamana invader Vigraharaja IV during his war against the Chaulukyas.

According to the Sundha Hill inscription, Samarasimha built extensive ramparts on the Kanakachala fort. G. H. Ojha identified Kanakachala with the fort of Jalor, same as Kanchanagiri fort mentioned in the 1185 CE inscription. According to D. R. Bhandarkar, Kanchanagiri or Kanakachala was the original name of the hill on which the fort was situated. Kirtipiala started the construction of a fort on this hill, and the work was completed by Samarasimha.

The Sundha Hill temple further states that the king established the town of Samarapura, after having weighed himself against gold. The identity of Samarapura is not known. Samarasimha's sister Rudaladevi also commissioned two Shiva temples.

== Personal life ==
Samarasimha had at least two sons and a daughter. His daughter Lila-devi married the Chaulukya monarch Bhima II. This is attested by the 1206 Kadi inscription of Bhima II.

His two sons were Manavasimha and Udayasimha. The elder son Manavasimha was an ancestor of the founders of the Chauhan principalities of Chandravati and Abu. Udayasimha succeeded Samarasimha on the throne of Jalore.
