= Udayasimha =

King of Javalipura from 1204 to 1257

- Maharajadhiraja

King of Javalipura
- Reign: c. 1204-1257 CE
- Predecessor: Samarasimha
- Successor: Chachigadeva
- Issue: Chachigadeva
- Dynasty: Chahamanas of Jalor
- Father: Samarasimha

Udaya-simha (IAST: Udayasiṃha, r. c. 1204-1257 CE) was an Indian king belonging to the Chahamana dynasty, who ruled the area around Javalipura (present-day Jalore in Rajasthan). The most powerful king of his dynasty, he overthrew the Chaulukya suzerainty, and became a sovereign ruler. However, some years later, he faced an invasion from the Delhi Sultanate, and became a tributary to the Sultan Iltutmish.

== Early life ==
Udayasimha was a son of the Chahamana ruler Samarasimha. He had a brother named Manavasimha. His sister Lila-devi married the Chaulukya monarch Bhima II.

Multiple inscriptions issued by Udayasimha have been found at Bhinmal: 1205 CE (Jagaswami temple), 1217 CE (Baraji resthouse), 1248 CE (Baraji resthouse) and 1249 CE (Nilkanth Mahadev temple). These mention his title as Maharajadhiraja.

== Military career ==
Like his ancestors, Udayasimha served as a feudatory of the Chaulukya rulers of Gujarat in the early part of his reign. During the reign of the Chaulukya ruler Bhima II, the Chaulukyas faced a Yadava invasion from south. Taking advantage of this, three northern Chaulukya feudatories in the Marwar region formed an alliance and rebelled against the imperial rule. These included Udayasimha, Somasimha and Dharavarsha (the Paramara chief of Abu). In the ensuing battle, Udayasimha was wounded by the Chaulukya general Lavanaprasada, but the conflict appears to have ended with an advantage for Udayasimha. The Sundha Mata inscription declares that he could not conquered by the Gurjara (Chaulukya) king. Even the Chaulukya chronicle Kirti-Kaumudi states that Lavanaprasada had to conclude a treaty with the rebels, and return to the troubled Chaulukya capital.

Before Udayasimha's ascension, his ancestral principality was largely confined to the area around Jalore. Udayasimha seems to have expanded his territory significantly. According to the Sundha Hill inscription, he ruled Javalipura (Jalor), Naddula (Nadol), Mandavyapura (Mandore), Vagabhatameru (Juna Barmer), Surachanda (Surachand), Ramasainya (Ramseen), Srimala (Bhinmal), and Satyapura (Sanchore), among other places. Historian Dasharatha Sharma theorizes that some of these places, which were earlier a part of the Chaulukya empire, came under Chahamana control while Lavanaprasada was busy fighting the Yadavas.

The Sundha Hill inscription further states that Udayasimha put an end to Sindhuraja. D. R. Bhandarkar identified Sindhuraja with a Chahamana ruler of the Lata branch. However, A. K. Srivastava does not find this identification convincing, as Sindhuraja of Lata had been killed by the Yadava king Simhana. According to Dasharatha Sharma, this Sindhuraja might have been a weak ruler of Sindh.

=== Conflict with the Delhi Sultanate ===
Udayasimha appears to have become a tributary to the Delhi Sultanate at some point, but refused to pay the tribute, leading to a war sometime during 1211-1216 CE. This conflict has been described in the medieval Muslim chronicles, such as the 13th century Taj-ul-Maasir of Hasan Nizami (which mentions Udayasimha of Jalore as "Udi Sah of Jalewar"), and the 16th century Tarikh-i-Firishta (which calls him "Oodye-Sa of Jalwur or Udi Sah of Jalewar"). Firishta states that the Delhi Sultan Iltutmish marched to Jalore when Udayasimha discontinued the tribute payments. Hasan Nizami mentions that this army included prominent generals such as Rukn-ud-din Hamza, Izz-ud-din Bakhtiyar, Nasir-ud-din Mardan Shah, Nasir-ud-din Ali, and Badr-ud-din Saukartigin. Udayasimha took shelter in the Jalore fort, but surrendered as soon as some bastions of the fort were demolished. The Sultan accepted the surrender in return for a tribute of 100 camels and 20 horses, and then returned to Delhi.

In 1221 CE, Iltutmish again launched an offensive against the Hindu rulers of present-day Rajasthan and Gujarat. Lavanaprasada's son Viradhavala and his minister Vastupala organized a confederacy of Hindu rulers, forcing the Delhi Sultan to retreat without a fight. According to the Gujarat chronicle Hammira-mada-mardana, the Chaulukya kingdom was invaded by three enemies: the Turushka (Turkic) ruler Milacchikara (Iltutmish), the Yadava king Singhana, and the Paramara king Devapala. The northern rebel feudatories (including Udayasimha) initially planned to side with the Turushkas, but Viradhavala convinced them to ally with the Chaulukyas.

Iltutmish appears to have led another expedition against Udayasimha. According to the 12th-century Muslim historian Minhaj-i-Siraj, Iltutmish conquered the Mandore fort in 1227 CE. Mandavyapura or Mandore, according to the Sundha Hil inscription, was in possession of Udayasimha.

Several Hindu accounts mention that Udayasimha succeeded against the Turushkas (that is, the Delhi Sultanate). The Sundha Hill inscription credits him with curbing the power of the Turushkas. The 17th-century chronicler Muhnot Nainsi states that "Sultan Jalal-ud-Din" attacked Jalore in 1241 CE, but was defeated and forced to retreat. In Nainsi ri Khyat, Nainsi quotes a doha according to which the asuras (Muslims) drank water from Sundara lake with their mouths, but Udaya(-simha) took this water out of their wives' eyes in form of tears. The Jain legend in the Puratana-Prabandha-Sangraha collection gives a similar account, but states that the attack was led by a general named Malik Ambar. The Turkic army drank quenched its thirst at Sundara lake, and halted at the Sirana village. There, Rawal (king) Udayasimha defeated them: Malik Ambar was killed in the battle.

The Puratana-Prabandha-Sangraha account goes on to mention that in 1253 CE, Jalal-ud-Din himself marched to Jalore. When the Delhi army damaged the fort using explosives, Udayasimha sent Rajaputra Bapada to negotiate a peace treaty with the invaders. Udayasimha agreed to Jalal-ud-Din's demand of 3,600,000 drammas (coins). Jalal-ud-Din also took as hostage Yashovira, a son of Udayasimha's minister. He then left for Delhi, and Udayasimha repaired the damaged walls of the fort. Since no Sultan named "Jalal-ud-Din" is known to have ruled during Udayasimha's lifetime, historian A. K. Srivastava theorizes that Hindu chroniclers used this name to refer to Iltutmish or one of his sons.

== Cultural activities ==
According to the Sundha Hill inscription, Udayasimha was a scholar who was conversant with Bharatamukha-Mahagrantha. According to historian Dasharatha Sharma, this term refers to Mahabharata. A. K. Srivastava, however, identifies it with Bharat's Natya Shastra.

He commissioned two Shiva temples at Javalipura. The text Nirbhaya-Bhimavyayoga states that it was composed during his reign.

== Personal life ==
Udayasimha and his queen Prahaladava-devi had two sons: Chachigadeva (his successor) and Chamundaraja. According to a 1337 CE Bhinmal inscription, he had another son named Vahadasimha.

Udayasimha's daughter married Virama, a son of the Chaulukya general (and later Vaghela king) Viradhavala. This marriage was probably in form of a matrimonial alliance. After Viradhavala's death, his sons Virama and Visala fought for the Vaghela throne. The Vaghela minister Vastupala supported Visala, because of which Virama was forced to flee the Vaghela kingdom. Virama took shelter with his in-laws, but the Chahamanas wanted to maintain good relations with the Vaghelas. Therefore, Udayasimha had Virama assassinated, possibly by his own son Chachigadeva. According to a Jain legend in the Puratana-Prabandha-Sangraha, Udayasimha later asked Visala to pay a tribute. Visala sent expeditions against Udayasimha, but failed to achieve any major success.
