= Chahamanas of Jalor =

Medieval Hindu dynasty of India

- c. 1160 CE–1311 CE
- Find spots of inscriptions issued during the reigns of Chahamana rulers of Jalor
- Capital: Jalor
- Religion: Hinduism
- Government: Monarchy
- History
  - Established: c. 1160 CE
  - Disestablished: 1311 CE
- Today part of: India

The Chahamanas of Jalor, also known as the Chauhans of Jalor in vernacular legends, were an Indian dynasty that ruled the area around Jalore in present-day Rajasthan between 1160 and 1311. They belonged to the Chahamana (Chauhan) clan of the Rajputs

They branched off from the Chahamanas of Naddula, and then ruled as feudatories of the Chaulukyas of Gujarat. For a brief period, they became independent, but ultimately succumbed to the Delhi Sultanate at the Siege of Jalore.

== History ==
The Chahamanas of Jalor descended from Alhana, a Chahamana king of the Naddula branch. Originally, the Jalore Fort was controlled by a branch of the Paramaras until early 12th century. The Chahamanas of Naddula seized its control during Alhana's reign. Kirtipala, a son of Alhana, received a feudal grant of 12 villages from his father and his brother (the crown-prince) Kelhana. He controlled his domains from Suvarnagiri or Sonagiri, the hill on which Jalore Fort is located. Because of this, the branch to which he belonged came to be known as Sonagara.

Kirtipala carved out an independent kingdom for himself before his death. He was a Hindu, but also patronized Jains. The family of his son and successor Samarasimha built several temples and other buildings. His son Udayasimha succeeded him, while another of his sons, Manavasimha was the ancestor of the Chauhan branch of Chandravati and Mount Abu. The ruling family of the Sirohi State descended from Manavasimha.

The Jalor dynasty reached its zenith under Udayasimha. He captured Naddula (Nadol), probably from the Delhi Sultan Aram Shah, who had earlier defeated the Chahamanas of Naddula. He also captured Mandavyapura (Mandor), but the Delhi Sultanate conquered it in 1226, under Iltumish. In addition, he conquered Vagbhatameru (Barmer), which was probably a principality ruled by a Paramara branch. He also conquered several other territories that were previously controlled by the Chaulukyas of Gujarat (Solankis). The Chaulukyas were fighting the Yadavas of Devagiri on their southern frontier. Taking advantage of this, Udayasimha formed a confederacy with the Guhilas of Mewar, the Paramaras of Chandravati and other rulers of Marwar. The confederacy attacked the Chaulukyas from north, following which the Chaulukya general Lavana-prasada was forced to sign a treaty with them. Udayasimha also formed a confederacy against Iltumish, forcing the Delhi Sultan to retreat from Marwar.

Udayasimha's son Chachigadeva retained the territories he inherited. Chachiga's son Samantasimha faced attack from the Delhi Sultanate, but was saved by his neighbour, the Vaghela king Saranagadeva. Kanhadadeva, practically the last king of the dynasty, was defeated and killed by the forces of Alauddin Khalji. According to the Kanhadade Prabandha, during this siege, Kanhadadeva's son Viramadeva was formally crowned King, but he died 2½ days later.

P

== List of rulers ==
The Chahamana rulers of the Jalor branch, with their estimated periods of reign, are as follows:

Virama-deva (1311 CE) was last ruler of dynasty, crowned during the Siege of Jalore, but died 2½ days later.

List of Chauhan rulers of Jalor
Serial no.	Kings	Reign (CE)
1	Kirti-pala	1160–1182
2	Samara-simha	1182–1204
3	Udaya-simha	1204–1257
4	Chachiga-deva	1257–1282
5	Samanta-simha	1282–1305
6	Kanhada-deva	1292–1311
7	Virama-deva	till 1311

== Family tree ==
Chahamanas of Jalor

Kirtipala^{(1)} r. c. 1160-1182
Samarasimha^{(2)} r. c. 1182-1204
Udayasimha^{(3)} r. c. 1204-1257
Chachigadeva^{(4)} r. c. 1257-1282
Samantasimha^{(5)} r. c. 1282-1305
Kanhadadeva^{(6)} r. c. 1291-1311
Viramadeva^{(7)} r. c. 1311

== Bibliography ==
- Dasharatha Sharma (1959). Early Chauhān Dynasties. S. Chand / Motilal Banarsidass. ISBN 9780842606189. OCLC 3624414.
- Ashok Kumar Srivastava (1979). The Chahamanas of Jalor. Sahitya Sansar Prakashan. OCLC 12737199.
