= Samantasimha (Chahamana) =

King of Javalipura from 1282 to 1305

- Maharajakula

King of Javalipura
- Reign: 1282–1305
- Predecessor: Chachigadeva
- Successor: Kanhadadeva
- Issue: Kanhadadeva
- Dynasty: Chahamana

Samantasimha (IAST: Sāmantasiṃha; r. 1282–1305) was a king belonging to the Chahamana dynasty, who ruled the area around Javalipura (present-day Jalore in Rajasthan). During the later half of his reign, he and his son Kanhadadeva jointly ran the administration. The Delhi Sultanate raided the kingdom twice during his reign, but could not capture it.

== Reign ==
Find spots of inscriptions issued during the reign of Samantasimha

Samantasimha succeeded Chachigadeva on the throne of Javalipura. He was probably Chachigadeva's son, although this cannot be said with certainty. He is also known as Samvantasimha and Samyantasimha. The inscriptions issued during his reign give his title as Maharajakula.

According to the 17th century chronicle Nainsi ri Khyat, Samantasimha had at least two sons: Kanhadadeva and Maladeva. As the heir apparent, Kanhadadeva assisted his father in administration from at least 1296 CE onwards. The 1299 CE Chohtan inscription refers to their joint reign.

=== Khalji invasion ===
According to the Gujarat chronicler Jinaprabha Suri, in 1291-92 CE (1398 VS), the Delhi Sultan Jalaluddin Khalji invaded the Chāhamāna kingdom of Javalipura(Jalore). Samantasimha Chahmana's neighbour Sarangadeva, the Vaghela king of Gujarat, came to his rescue. Khalji's army advanced up to Sanchore, but was forced to retreat by the Vaghelas, who were perhaps concerned that the Delhi Sultan would invade Gujarat next.

In 1299, Jalaluddin Khalji's successor Alauddin Khalji sent an army to Gujarat, under the command of Ulugh Khan and Nusrat Khan. While returning from Gujarat, the Delhi army marched through the kingdom of Jalore. There, a section of the Delhi army rebelled against their commanders over distribution of the plunder from Gujarat. According to Munhot Nainsi, Samantasimha's envoys met the neo-Muslim rebel leader Mammushah (Muhammad Shah). Three days after this meeting, the Khalji army was attacked by the rebels from one side and by the Jalore army from the other side. The mutiny was ultimately crushed. Ziauddin Barani's Tarikh-i-Firuz Shahi (14th century) also describes the mutiny, but does not mention the Chahamana participation in the conflict. The veracity of Nainsi's account is doubtful, as he inaccurately states that Alauddin personally led the Gujarat campaign.

== Inscriptions ==
The following inscriptions dated to Samantasimha's reign have been found:

Date	Place	Purpose	Source
1283 CE (1339 VS)	Bhinmal	Grants by Guhila Sahajapala and his wife	
1284 CE (1340 VS)	Budtara	Construction of a well or tank by Rupadevi (daughter of Chachigadeva)	
1286 CE (1342 VS)	Bhinmal	Grant to the Mahalakshmi temple by Rathoda Alhanasimha	
1288 CE (1345 VS)	Bhinmal	Grant of a golden kalasha (cupola) and 200 gold coins to the Jagasvamin temple	
1288 CE (1345 VS)	Sanchore	Religious endowment	
1295 CE (1352 VS)	Juna Barmer	Religious grants at the Adinatha temple	
1296 CE (1353 VS)	Jalore	Grants to the Parshvanatha temple by family of Narpati and Gunadhara	
1299 CE (1355 VS)	Chohtan		
