= Kanhadadeva =

King of Javalipura from 1291 to 1311

King of Javalipura
- Reign: 1291–1311
- Predecessor: Samantasimha
- Issue: Viramadeva
- Dynasty: Chahamana
- Father: Samantasimha

Kanhadadeva (IAST: Kānhaḍa-deva; r. 1292–1311) was a king belonging to the Chahamana dynasty, who ruled the area around Javalipura (present-day Jalore in Rajasthan). Initially, he ran the administration jointly with his father Samantasimha, and helped ward off invasions from the Delhi Sultanate.

After the Delhi ruler Alauddin Khalji conquered the neighbouring fort of Siwana, Kanhadadeva's armies fought several skirmishes with him. In 1311, Kanhadadeva was defeated and killed in an attack led by Alauddin's general Malik Kamaluddin. He is celebrated as a hero in Kanhadade Prabandha, a 1455 poem by Padmanābha.

== Early life ==
Kanhadadeva was a son of his predecessor Samantasimha. He was also known as "Dasam Saligrama" and "Gokulanatha". According to the 17th-century chronicler Munhot Nainsi, he had a brother named Maladeva.

== Joint administration with Samantasimha ==
As the heir apparent, Kanhadadeva assisted his father in administration from at least 1296 CE onwards. A 1296 pillar inscription discovered at Topkhana in Jalore states that Kanhadadeva shared the burden of administration during his father's reign. The 1299 CE Chohtan inscription also refers to the joint reign of the father-son duo. No inscription from Kanhadadeva's reign has been discovered, but the last extant inscription from his father's reign is dated 1305. Therefore, Kanhadadeva appears to have ascended the throne sometime around 1305.

=== Delhi Sultanate's Gujarat campaign ===
In 1299, the Delhi Sultanate ruler Alauddin Khalji sent an expedition to Gujarat led by his generals Ulugh Khan and Nusrat Khan. The Kanhadade Prabandha claims that Kanhadadeva (then a prince) did not permit the Delhi forces to pass through his territory, concerned that they would "sack villages, take prisoners, molest women, oppress Brahmanas and slay cows". The Khalji army reached Gujarat via another route in Mewar, defeated its king Karna, and ransacked Gujarat.

After its victorious campaign in Gujarat, the Delhi army passed through Jalore on its way back to Delhi. According to the 17th-century chronicle Nainsi ri Khyat, the Delhi army encamped at "Sakarana" near Jalore. The Kanhadade Prabandha names the place as "Sirana": it can be identified with modern Sankarna. Kanhadadeva sent Kandhala Olecha and four other messengers to the Delhi commander, expressing his displeasure over their stay in his territory, after they had imprisoned Hindus and desecrated the Somanatha temple in Gujarat. These messengers came in contact with the neo-Muslim leader Mammunshah (Muhammad Shah) and his brothers, who were planning a mutiny against the Delhi generals. Three days later, these rebel generals attacked the Delhi army's camp from one side, while Kanhadadeva's army attacked it from the other side. The rebels killed a brother of Nusrat Khan and a nephew of Alauddin, but the mutiny was completely suppressed within 4 days.

The Kanhadade Prabandha does not mention any mutiny by the Delhi soldiers, and states that the attack on the Delhi camp was led by Kanhadadeva's minister Jaita Devada. The Delhi chronicles, such as Ziauddin Barani's Tarikh-i-Firuz Shahi, describe the mutiny, but do not mention any Chahamana participation in the unsuccessful mutiny. Historian Dasharatha Sharma believes that Nainsi's account, which mentions collaboration between Kanhadadeva's forces and the mutineers, is an accurate representation of the conflict. However, Nainsi inaccurately states that Alauddin personally led the Delhi army during this campaign, and that he was present at the time of the mutiny. Therefore, historian Kishori Saran Lal also doubts the veracity of the rest of Nainsi's account including the claim that the Jalore army aided the mutiny.

=== Somanatha idol ===
The Kanhadade Prabandha and Nainsi ri Khyat also credit Kanhadadeva with rescuing the Somnath temple idol from desecration by the Delhi army. This claim also occurs in Ranamalla Chhanda (1408–1411) by Shridhara Vyasa. According to these texts, Kanhadadeva's army liberated several Hindu prisoners, and recovered the Somnath idol, which was being taken to Delhi to be desecrated. Kanhadadeva is said to have installed the five fragments of this idol at Prabhas Patan, Bagada, Abu, Jalor and his personal garden. The Kanhadade Prabandha hails him an incarnation of Krishna for this act.

However, other sources state that the idol was taken to Delhi; these sources include Amir Khusrau's Khazainul-Futuh, Barani's Tarikh-i-Firuz Shahi and Jinaprabha's Vividha-tirtha-kalpa. It is possible that the story of Kanhadadeva's rescue of the Somnath idol is a fabrication by the later writers. Alternatively, it is possible that the Khalji army was taking multiple idols to Delhi, and Kanhadadeva's army retrieved one of them.

=== Asylum to the rebels ===
Nainsi ri Khyat further claims that Mammushah (Muhammad Shah) and his brother Gabharu, who had rebelled against the Delhi generals, took asylum with Kanhadadeva. However, Kanhadadeva disapproved of their killing of cows (which are sacred to Hindus). Therefore, the two rebels left Jalore, and sought shelter with Hammiradeva at Ranthambore.

== Defeat against Alauddin Khalji ==
Delhi and Jalore in present-day India

At the beginning of the 14th century, the Delhi Sultanate ruler Alauddin Khalji captured the forts of Ranthambore (1301) and Chittor (1303), which made him a neighbour of Kanhadadeva. Different medieval writers give different accounts of the events leading up to Alauddin's invasion of Jalore.

The 15th century Kanhadade Prabandha claims that Alauddin's daughter Piroja fell in love with Kanhadade's son. Alauddin offered to marry her to the Chahamana prince, stating the couple had also been married in several previous births. He even visited Jalor, where he was treated well because he behaved like a Hindu. However, the Chahamana prince rejected the offer as an insult. The prince was later killed in a battle. His head was brought to Alauddin, but it miraculously turned away when the Sultan turned towards it. Princess Piroja, who loved the Chahamana prince, immolated herself while holding his head. The text names the Siwana ruler Sataladeva (Sitaladeva) as Kanhadadeva's general and nephew. It claims that when the Delhi army invaded the Chahamana kingdom, Sataladeva raided their camp at Mandore. The Khaljis next invaded the Siwana fort, but Sataladeva repulsed them with help of an army sent by Kanhaddeva. The invaders lost their commanders Nahar Malik and Khandadhara Bhoja in this battle. Alauddin later personally led an army to Siwana, and defeated Sataladeva. Following this victory, Alauddin's generals started ransacking the neighbouring territory, bringing them into conflict with Kanhadadeva's forces.

According to the 16th century Tarikh-i-Firishta, Alauddin sent an army to besiege Jalore in 1305. Samantasimha was probably dead by this time, and Kanhaddeva had become the sole ruler of the kingdom. The Khalji commander Ain-ul-Mulk Multani convinced Kalhanadeva to visit Delhi and to become an ally of the Khaljis. Kanhadadeva visited Delhi, but he was not satisfied with the terms offered to him, and returned to Jalore. A few years later, Kanhadadeva heard Alauddin boasting that no Hindu ruler could challenge him. This rekindled Kanhadadeva's sense of pride, and he decided to fight with Alauddin, resulting in an invasion of Jalore. This narrative is also repeated by the 17th century historian Hajiuddabir.

The 17th-century writer Munhot Nainsi does not mention Kanhadadeva's visit to Delhi, but states that his son Viramadeva stayed at the court of Delhi for some time. Once, Alauddin offered to marry his daughter to Viramadeva. The Chahamana prince did not want to marry the Khalji princess, but could not openly refuse the offer. He asked for Alauddin's permission to return to Jalore, promising to return with a marriage party. When he did not return, Alauddin sent a 500,000-strong force to Jalor. This force, led by Mudfar (Muzaffar) Khan and Dauda Khan, besieged the Jalor fort for 12 years.

None of these accounts are historically reliable. By 1310, Alauddin had subjugated the kingdoms surrounding Jalore, including Gujarat, Malwa, Chittor, Ranthambore and Siwana. It appears that he attacked Jalore simply because he wanted to put an end to Jalore's independent status.

The forces sent by Alauddin against Jalore initially failed to capture the fort. In 1311, Alauddin dispatched a stronger army led by Malik Kamaluddin Gurg, which defeated and killed Kanhadadeva. Nainsi's Khyat suggests that many people believed that Kanhadadeva managed to survive and disappeared. His son Viramadeva is said to have died 2.5 days after his coronation.

== Legacy ==
Kanhadadeva is eulogized as "Kanhadade" in Kanhadade Prabandha (1455), an epic authored by Padmanabha, who was a court poet employed by the later rulers of Jalore. The text is written in Prakrit language with Old Rajasthani and some Gujarati influences. It mentions Kanhadade as a Rajput king and describes his struggles against Alauddin Khalji, the Sultan of Delhi. The text demonizes Muslims, and hails Kanhadade as a saviour who defeated the Muslims responsible for desecrating the Somnath temple.
