= Jalore =

City in India

Jalore जालौर Suvarngiri, Jabalipura
- Town
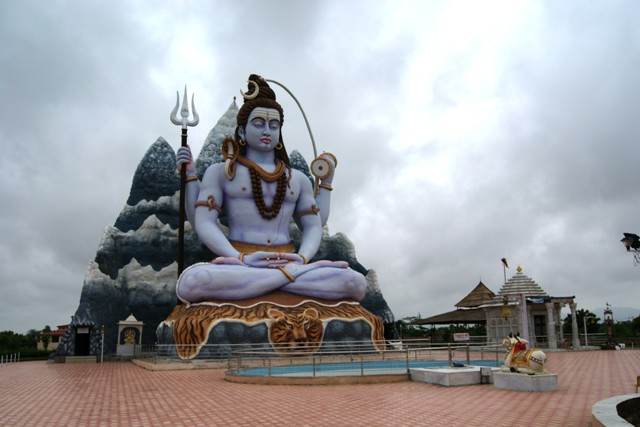
- Kailash Dham Bishangarh
- Nickname: Granite City of India
- Location in Rajasthan, India Jalore (India)
- Coordinates: 25.35°N 72.62°E
- Country: India
- State: Rajasthan
- District: Jalore
- Named for: Jaabaali

Government
  - Body: Nagar Parishad
  - MP (Member of Parliament): Devji Patel
- Elevation: 178 m (584 ft)

Population (2011)
  - Total: 54,081

Languages
  - Official: Hindi
- Time zone: UTC+5:30 (IST)
- PIN: 343001
- Telephone code: +91-2973
- Vehicle registration: RJ-16
- Nearest city: Bishangarh, Sirohi, Balotra, Mehsana, Jodhpur
- Website: jalore.rajasthan.gov.in

Jalore (ISO 15919 : Jālora ), also known as Granite City, is a city in the western Indian state of Rajasthan. It is the administrative headquarters of Jalore District.

It has a river known as Jawai Nadi. Jalore lies to south of Sukri river, a tributary of Luni river and the river Jawai Nadi passes through it. The town is about 140 km (87 mi) south of Jodhpur and 489 km (304 mi) from the state capital Jaipur. Jalore hasn't grown that much in terms of infrastructure. The town center has many corporate offices like Axis Bank, Punjab National Bank, UCO Bank, Birla Sun Life Insurance Ltd, Shreeram Transport Finance Company among others.

== History ==
In ancient times Jalore was known as Jabalipura - named after the Hindu saint Jabali. The town was also known as Suvarngiri or Songir, the Golden Mount, on which the fort stands. It was a flourishing town in the 8th century and according to some historical sources, in the 8th-9th centuries, one branch of the Pratihara empire ruled at Jablipur (Jalore). Uddyotana-sūri composed Kuvalaya-mālā at Jabalipura in 779 CE, during the reign of the Gurjara-Pratihara king Vatsaraja.

Raja Man Pratihar was ruling Bhinmal in jalore when Parmara Emperor Vakpati Munja (r. 972–990) invaded the region — after this conquest he divided these conquered territories among his Parmara princes - his son Aranyaraj Parmar was granted Abu region, his son and his nephew Chandan Parmar, Dharnivarah Parmar was given Jalore region . This ended almost 250 years Pratihar rule over Bhinmal. Raja Man Pratihar's son Dewalsimha Pratihar was a contemporary of Abu's Raja Mahipal Parmar (r. 1000–1014). Raja Devalsimha made many attempts to free his country or to re-establish Pratihar hold onto Bhinmal but in vain. Finally he settled for the territories in Southwest of Bhinmal, comprising four hills - Dodasa, Nadwana, Kala-Pahad and Sundha. He made Lohiyana (present Jaswantpura) his capital. Hence this subclan became Dewal Pratihars. Gradually their jagir included 52 villages in and around modern Jalore district. The Dewals participated in Jalore's Chauhan Kanhaddeo's resistance against Allauddin Khilji. Thakur Dhawalsimha Dewal of Lohiyana supplied manpower to Maharana Pratap and married his daughter to the Maharana, in return Maharana gave him the title of “Rana” which has stayed with them till this day

In the 10th century, Jalore was ruled by the Paramaras. In 1181, Kirtipala, the youngest son of Alhana, the Chahamana ruler of Nadol, captured Jalore from the Paramaras and founded the Jalore line of Chauhans. His son Samarasimha succeeded him in 1182. Samarasimha was succeeded by Udayasimha, who expanded the kingdom by recapturing Nadol and Mandor from the Turks. During Udayasimha's reign, Jalore was a tributary of the Delhi Sultanate. Udayasimha was succeeded by Chachigadeva and Samantasimha. Samantasimha was succeeded by his son Kanhadadeva.

During the reign of Kanhadadeva, Jalor was attacked and captured in 1311 by the Delhi's Afghan Sultan Alauddin Khalji. Kanhadadeva and his son Viramadeva died defending Jalore.

Jalore was the hometown of Jaiwanta Bai, mother of Maharana Pratap (1572–1597). She was the daughter of Akhey Raj Songara. Rathore rulers of Ratlam used the Jalore fort to safe-keep their treasure.

The Turkic rulers of Palanpur State of Gujarat briefly ruled Jalor in the 16th century and it became part of the Mughal Empire. It was restored to Marwar in 1704, and remained part of the kingdom until shortly after Indian Independence in 1947.

Ambliara princely state in Gujarat are the pedigree of Jalore Maharani Popadevi. Ambliara has a small princely state in Mahi Kantha Agency Present days near Bayad taluka of Aravalli District Gujarat.

There are 12 Math (Big Hindu monasteries) and 13 Takiya (Masjid).

Jalore is known as the "Cradle of the Marwari horse" - an indigenous horse breed famed for its beauty, endurance and loyalty to the horsemen who fought interminable wars on horseback.

== Visitor attractions of Jalore ==
Types of Attractions	Description
Forts And Palace	Jalore Fort; Rawala Ummedbad nowaday known as Aasan made by royal family of Jalore.; Topekhana
Hindu Temple	Kaniwada Hanuman Temple; Sire Mandir at Jalore; Sundha Mata; Kshemkari Mata Temple; Kailashdham at Bishangarh with huge statue of lord Shiva.; Dhabbawali Mata Temple at Khasravi
Mosque	Malik Shah's mosque
Jain Temples	Jain temples built in the 8th century, dedicated to the first Tirthankara of Jainism, Rishabha, the 16th Tirthankara, Shantinath, the 23rd Tirthankara, Parsva and the 24th Tirthankara, Mahavira, Derasars of Rishabha, Munisuvrata, Acharya Rajendrasuri and Neminath; Jain Tirth Bhandavpur, an ancient Jain centre which is now a major pilgrimage place
