= Kirtipala =

King of Javalipura from 1160 to 1182

- Maharaja

King of Javalipura
- Reign: c. 1160-1182 CE
- Successor: Samarasimha
- Issue: Samarasimha
- Dynasty: Chahamanas of Jalor
- Father: Alhana

Kirti-pala (IAST: Kīrtipāla, r. c. 1160-1182 CE), also known as Kitu in vernacular legends, was an Indian king belonging to the Chahamana dynasty of Javalipura (modern Jalore). A member of the Naddula Chahamana family, he carved out a principality for himself with Jalore at its capital. He ruled parts of southern Rajasthan as a feudatory of the Chaulukyas, and participated in their successful battle against Muhammad of Ghor in 1178 CE. He also fought with other Chaulukya feudatories, including Asala of Kiratakupa (modern Kiradu) and the Guhila chief Samantasimha.

== Early life ==
Kirtipala was the youngest of the three sons of the Naddula Chahamana king Alhana and queen Annalla-devi. Kirtipala's elder brother Kelhana became the king of Naddula, while Kirtipala himself became the governor of a fief of 12 villages. According to Kirtipala's 1161 CE Nadol copper-plate inscription, the 12 villages given to him by Alhana and prince Kelhana were:

- Darjit
- Devasuri
- Harvandam
- Kanasuvam
- Kavilada
- Madada
- Mauvadi
- Morekera
- Nadada
- Naddula-grama
- Sonanama
- Sujera

In the 1182 CE Jalor inscription of his son Samarasimha, he is styled as "Maharaja Kirtipala-deva".

== Military career ==
Javalipura was originally ruled by the members of a Paramara branch. According to the 17th century chronicle Nainsi ri Khyat, the pradhana (prime minister) of the local Paramara ruler was a Dahiya Rajput. Kitu (Kirtipala) managed to take control of Javalipura after winning over this Dahiya pradhana. Kirtipala's conquest of Javalipura appears to have happened during the reign of his father Alhana. He continued to govern this territory during the reign of his brother Kelhana. At least in the early part of his reign, he acknowledged the suzerainty of his brother.

The Chaulukyas of Gujarat were the ultimate overlords of both Naddula and Jalore Chahamana branches. The Sundha Hill inscription boasts that Kirtipala routed the Turushka (Turkic) army at Kasahrada (modern Kyara in Sirohi district). This refers to an 1178 CE battle, in which the Chaulukya army defeated the Ghurid ruler Muhammad of Ghor. Kirtipala seems to have joined the Chaulukya forces in this battle, during the reign of Mularaja II.

A Kumbhalgarh inscription suggests that Kirtipala invaded the Guhila kingdom, and ousted its ruler Samantasimha. Kirtipala probably launched this invasion during 1171-1179 CE, with the approval of his Chaulukya overlord. Later, Samantasimha's younger brother Kumarasimha gained his ancestral throne by appeasing the Chaulukya king, who was probably Mularaja II or his predecessor Ajayapala. Kirtipala seems to have given up his allegiance to the Chaulukyas as a result of this episode.

According to the Sundha Hill inscription, Kirtipala defeated Asala, the ruler of Kiratakupa (modern Kiradu) and a vassal of the Chaulukyas. Earlier, in 1152 CE, Kirtipala's father Alhana had obtained control of Kiratakupa as a feudatory of the Chaulukya king Kumarapala. Sometime later, the Chaulukyas had transferred control of Kiratakupa to another Chahamana prince called Madanabrahma. Asala was probably the successor of Madanabrahma.

== Personal life ==
Kirtipala had at least three sons and a daughter. The three sons were Samarasimha, Lakhanapala and Abhayapala. Samarasimha was his eldest son and successor. According to the 1176 Lalrai inscription, Lakhanapala and Abhayapala controlled Sinavana, which can be identified with the modern Sonana village. The Sundha Hill inscription states that Kirtipala's daughter Rudala-devi commissioned two Shiva temples at Javalipura.

Kirtipala was a Hindu, but also patronized Jains. His 1161 Nadol grant portrays him as a worshipper of Surya (the sun), Agni (fire), and Maheshvara (Shiva). It then records a grant to a Jain temple.
