= Padmanābha =

15th-century Indian poet and historian

Padmanābha was a 15th-century Indian poet and historian. He has been hailed as the Yug Charan (Charan of the Era) for commemorating Kanhadade's struggle in his famous treatise "Kanhadade Prabandha", written in 1455.

This work has been praised as the finest work in Dingal (Old Gujarati or Old Western Rajasthani), and one of the greatest Indian works written during the medieval period by eminent scholars like Muni Jinvijay, K.M. Munshi, Dasharatha Sharma and K.B. Vyas. The German Indologist Georg Bühler was the first Western scholar who wrote about this treatise. The work was translated into English by V.S. Bhatnagar, a professor of History at the University of Rajasthan, Jaipur.
