= Arathwada =

- village
- Location in Rajasthan, India Arathwada (India)
- Country: India
- State: Rajasthan

Languages
  - Official: Hindi
- Time zone: UTC+5:30 (IST)
- PIN: 307040
- ISO 3166 code: RJ-IN

Arathwada is a village in the district of Sirohi in Rajasthan state in Western India. It has a population of about 8000, most of whom are members of the Jain (Gadiya) community.

Arathwada has a Jain temple of paraswnath bhagwan The nearest village is Posalia, which has a Jain temple of Sri Posli Paraswnath Bhagwaan and a very ancient temple of Sri Lokeshwar Mahadev.
