= Mool =

Mool may refer to:

== Surname ==
- Karl Mööl (born 1992), Estonian football player
- Mux Mool, American musician and artist

== Given name ==
- Mool Chand Chowhan (1927–2009), Indian sports official
- Mool Chand Daga, Indian politician
- Mool Chand Jain (1915–1997)
- Mool Chand Meena (1992-2006)
- Mool Chand Sharma
- Mool Singh (1947–2016), Indian politician
