= Erinpura =

- village
- Location in Rajasthan, India Erinpura (India)
- Coordinates: 25.141244°N 73.057444°E
- Country: India
- State: Rajasthan
- District: Sirohi
- Tehsil: Sheoganj

Languages
  - Official: Hindi, Marwari
- Time zone: UTC+5:30 (IST)
- Telephone code: 02933
- Vehicle registration: RJ-22
- Lok Sabha constituency: Pali (Lok Sabha Constituency)
- Vidhan Sabha constituency: Sumerpur
- Avg. annual temperature: 22.5 °C (72.5 °F)
- Avg. summer temperature: 45 °C (113 °F)
- Avg. winter temperature: 00 °C (32 °F)

Erinpura is a 16th century village known for its army cantonment at the time of sirohi princely state this cantonment was under Feudal Lords of Chandana jagir, after the establishment of sheoganj town by maharao sheo singh of sirohi it was made khalsa and it was a British cantonment in British rule also called as “chawwani”. It is located in the Sheoganj Tehsil of the Sirohi district. It is located near the Jawai River; the Jawai Bandh station was earlier known as Erinpura Road.

Erinpura is also a center for weather reports. Historically, Erinpura was the border line of jodhpur and sirohi states and later on base of two successive military units: The Jodhpur Legion and the 43rd Erinpura Regiment.

== 1857 Revolt ==
The Jodhpur Legion based at Erinpura started revolt on 23 August 1857, during the war called by the British "The Indian Mutiny" and nowadays considered in India to be its First War of Independence. Its troops operated in Jodhpur state for some time, in cooperation with Khushal Singh, Thakur of Auwa, who was in rebellion against the British. On 8 September 1857, the Legion defeated a force of local levies raised by the Raja of Jodhpur, who remained loyal to the British.

Subsequently, this Legion remained at Auwa till 10 October 1857, when they embarked on a march towards Delhi via Marwar Junction and Rewari. The British sent a force commanded by Colonel John Grant Gerrard from Delhi to intercept them. On 16 November 1857, a battle took place at Narnaul where Gerrard's force defeated the Legion. However, Gerrard suffered mortal wounds during the pursuit and subsequently died.

== 43rd Erinpura Regiment ==
Erinpura was the base for the 43rd Erinpura Regiment of the British India Army between 1860 and 1921. It was an irregular force till 1903, when it was officially regularized. In 1921 the regiment was disbanded.

== SS Erinpura ship ==
SS Erinpura, a passenger liner built for the British-India Steam Navigation Company, and the first British India ship built for Eastern Service to be fitted with radio, takes its name from the village. It was sunk in the Mediterranean on 1 May 1943 by German bombers.
