= Sojat Assembly constituency =

Legislative Assembly constituency in Rajasthan State, India

Coordinates: 25.93°N 73.67°E

Sojat
- Constituency No. 117 for the Rajasthan Legislative Assembly

Constituency details
- Country: India
- Region: North India
- State: Rajasthan
- District: Pali
- Lok Sabha constituency: Pali
- Established: 1972
- Total electors: 246,238
- Reservation: None

Member of Legislative Assembly
- 16th Rajasthan Legislative Assembly
- Incumbent Shobha Chauhan
- Party: Bharatiya Janata Party

Sojat Assembly constituency is one of the 200 Legislative Assembly constituencies of Rajasthan state in India.

It is part of Pali district. As of 2018, it is represented by Shobha Chauhan of the Bharatiya Janata Party.

== Members of the Legislative Assembly ==
Year	Member	Party
2003	Laxmi Narayan Dave	Bharatiya Janata Party
2008	Sanjana Agari	Bharatiya Janata Party
2013	Sanjana Agari	Bharatiya Janata Party
2018	Shobha Chauhan	Bharatiya Janata Party
2023	Shobha Chauhan	Bharatiya Janata Party

== Election results ==
=== 2023 ===
Rajasthan Legislative Assembly Election, 2023: Sojat
Party	Candidate	Votes	%	±%
BJP	Shobha Chauhan	94,852	55.76	+1.52
INC	Niranjan Arya	63,080	37.08	+4.63
ASP(KR)	Ramchandre	2,266	1.33	
AAP	Om Prakash	1,993	1.17	
NOTA	None of the above	2,024	1.19	+0.26
Majority		31,772	18.68	−3.11
Turnout		170,105	69.08	+2.35
BJP hold		Swing		

=== 2018 ===
2018 Rajasthan Legislative Assembly election: Sojat
Party	Candidate	Votes	%	±%
BJP	Shobha Chauhan	80,645	54.24	
INC	Shobha Solanki	48,247	32.45	
Abhinav Rajasthan Party	Dileep Kumar	3,616	2.43	
BSP	Kanhaiyalal Parihar	3,196	2.15	
RLP	Manak Ram Solanki	2,638	1.77	
Independent	Rameshwar Chouhan	2,203	1.48	
Independent	Rajesh Kumar	1,965	1.32	
Independent	Manju Devi	1,422	0.96	
NOTA	None of the above	1,387	0.93	
Majority		32,398	21.79	
Turnout		148,670	66.73	

== See also ==
- List of constituencies of the Rajasthan Legislative Assembly
- Pali district
