= Pali Assembly constituency =

Legislative Assembly constituency in Rajasthan State, India

Coordinates: 25.78°N 73.32°E

Pali
- Constituency No. 118 for the Rajasthan Legislative Assembly

Constituency details
- Country: India
- Region: North India
- State: Rajasthan
- District: Pali
- Lok Sabha constituency: Pali
- Established: 1957
- Total electors: 274,659
- Reservation: None

Member of Legislative Assembly
- 16th Rajasthan Legislative Assembly
- Incumbent Bheem Raj Bhati
- Party: Indian National Congress
- Elected year: 2023

Pali Assembly constituency is one of the 200 Legislative Assembly constituencies of Rajasthan state in India. It is in Pali district and is a segment of Pali Lok Sabha constituency.

== Member of the Legislative Assembly ==
Election	Member	Party
1957	Mool Chand	Indian National Congress
1962	Kesri Singh	Swatantra Party
1967	M. Chand	Indian National Congress
1972	Shankar Lal	Indian National Congress
1977	Mool Chand Daga	Indian National Congress
1980	Manak Lal Mehta	Indian National Congress
1985	Pushpa	Bharatiya Janata Party
1990	Pusp Jain	Bharatiya Janata Party
1993	Bheem Raj Bhati	Independent
1998	Gyanchand Parakh	Bharatiya Janata Party
2003	Gyanchand Parakh	Bharatiya Janata Party
2008	Gyanchand Parakh	Bharatiya Janata Party
2013	Gyanchand Parakh	Bharatiya Janata Party
2018	Gyanchand Parakh	Bharatiya Janata Party
2023	Bheem Raj Bhati	Indian National Congress

== Election results ==
=== 2023 ===
Rajasthan Legislative Assembly Election, 2023: Pali
Party	Candidate	Votes	%	±%
INC	Bheem Raj Bhati	95,092	50.25	+31.02
BJP	Gyanchand Parakh	87,204	46.08	+2.28
RLP	Dungar Ram	2,738	1.45	
NOTA	None of the above	1,760	0.93	−0.25
Majority		7,888	4.17	−7.08
Turnout		189,256	68.91	−0.31
INC gain from BJP		Swing		

=== 2018 ===
Rajasthan Legislative Assembly Election, 2018: Pali
Party	Candidate	Votes	%	±%
BJP	Gyanchand Parakh	75,480	43.8	
Independent	Bheemraj Bhati	56,094	32.55	
INC	Mahaveer Singh Sukarlai	33,143	19.23	
Independent	Vishal	1,938	1.12	
NOTA	None of the above	2,026	1.18	
Majority		19,386	11.25	
Turnout		172,348	69.22	

== See also ==
- List of constituencies of the Rajasthan Legislative Assembly
- Pali district
