= Pali Lok Sabha constituency =

Lok Sabha Constituency in Rajasthan

Coordinates: 25.8°N 73.3°E

Pali
- Lok Sabha constituency
- Interactive Map Outlining Pali Lok Sabha Constituency

Constituency details
- Country: India
- Region: North India
- State: Rajasthan
- Assembly constituencies: Sojat; Pali; Marwar Junction; Bali; Sumerpur; Osian; Bhopalgarh; Bilara
- Established: 1952
- Reservation: None

Member of Parliament
- 18th Lok Sabha
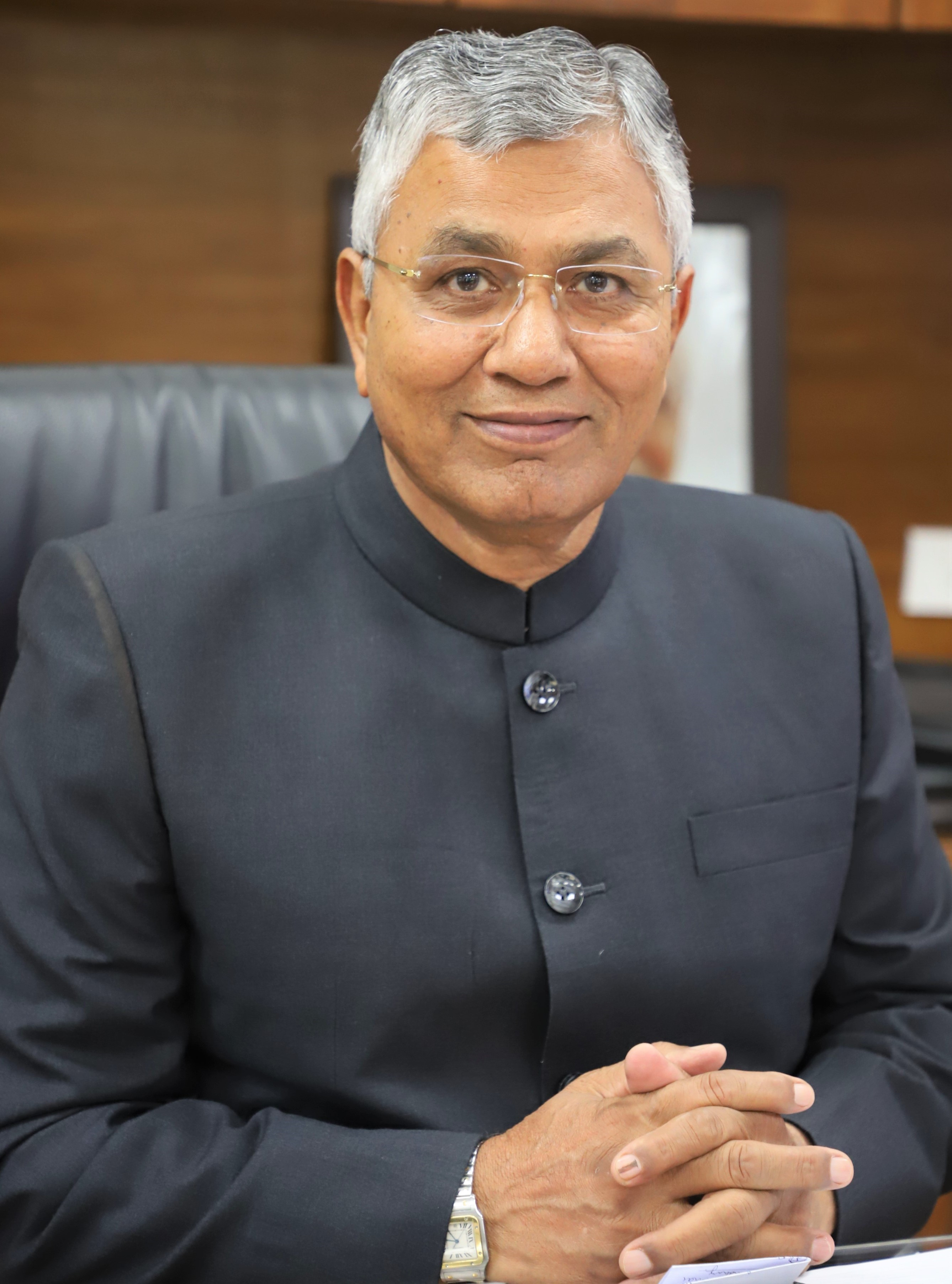
- Incumbent P. P. Chaudhary
- Party: Bharatiya Janata Party
- Elected year: 2024

Pali Lok Sabha constituency (Hindi pronunciation: [paːliː]) is in Pali district, in the Indian state of Rajasthan.

== Assembly segments ==
After the delimitation, presently this constituency comprises the following eight Vidhan Sabha segments:

#	Name	District	Member	Party	2024 Lead
117	Sojat	Pali	Shobha Chauhan	BJP	BJP
118	Pali	Pali	Bheem Raj Bhati	INC	BJP
119	Marwar Junction	Pali	Kesaram Choudhary	BJP	BJP
120	Bali	Pali	Pushpendra Singh	BJP	BJP
121	Sumerpur	Pali	Joraram Kumawat	BJP	BJP
125	Osian	Jodhpur	Bhairaram Chaudhary	BJP	BJP
126	Bhopalgarh (SC)	Jodhpur	Geeta Barwar	INC	INC
131	Bilara (SC)	Jodhpur	Arjun Lal	BJP	BJP

Before the delimitation of the parliamentary constituencies in 2008, this Lok Sabha constituency comprised the following eight Vidhan Sabha (legislative assembly) segments:

1. Bali, Desuri (SC), Jaitaran, Kharchi,
2. Pali, Raipur, Sojat, Sumerpur

== Members of Parliament ==
Year	Member	Party
1952	General Ajit Singh	Independent
1957	Harish Chandra Mathur	Indian National Congress
1962	Jaswantraj Mehta	Indian National Congress
1967	S K Tapuriah	Swatantra Party
1971	Mool Chand Daga	Indian National Congress (R)
1977	Amrit Nahata	Janata Party
1980	Mool Chand Daga	Indian National Congress
1984	Mool Chand Daga	Indian National Congress
1988^	Shankar Lal Sharma	Indian National Congress
1989	Guman Mal Lodha	Bharatiya Janata Party
1991	Guman Mal Lodha	Bharatiya Janata Party
1996	Guman Mal Lodha	Bharatiya Janata Party
1998	Mitha Lal Jain	Indian National Congress
1999	Pusp Jain	Bharatiya Janata Party
2004	Pusp Jain	Bharatiya Janata Party
2009	Badri Ram Jakhar	Indian National Congress
2014	P. P. Chaudhary	Bharatiya Janata Party
2019	P. P. Chaudhary	Bharatiya Janata Party
2024	P. P. Chaudhary	Bharatiya Janata Party

== Election results ==
=== 2024 ===
2024 Indian general election: Pali
Party	Candidate	Votes	%	±%
BJP	P. P. Chaudhary	757,389	55.94	
INC	Sangeeta Beniwal	512,038	37.82	
NOTA	None of the above		1.02	
Majority				
Turnout		13,53,842		
BJP hold		Swing		

=== 2019 ===
2019 Indian general elections: Pali
Party	Candidate	Votes	%	±%
BJP	P. P. Chaudhary	900,149	66.20	+1.33
INC	Badri Ram Jakhar	4,18,552	30.78	+2.28
NOTA	None of the Above	15,180	1.12	
SS	Kanhaiyalal Vaishnav	7,745	0.57	
Margin of victory		4,81,597	35.42	
Turnout		13,61,515	62.98	
BJP hold		Swing		

=== 2014 Lok Sabha ===
2014 Indian general elections: Pali
Party	Candidate	Votes	%	±%
BJP	P. P. Chaudhary	711,772	64.87	+38.46
INC	Munni Devi Godara	3,12,733	28.50	−25.12
BSP	Bhojraj	16,469	1.50	−13.49
NOTA	None of the Above	17,703	1.61	N/A
Majority		3,99,039	36.37	+9.16
Turnout		10,97,253	57.69	+14.73
BJP gain from INC		Swing	+11.25	

=== 2009 Lok Sabha ===
2009 Indian general elections: Pali
Party	Candidate	Votes	%	±%
INC	Badri Ram Jakhar	3,87,604	53.62	
BJP	Pusp Jain	1,90,887	26.41	
BSP	Shambhu Singh Khetasar	1,08,388	14.99	
Independent	Hari Lal Kalal	12,098	1.67	
Majority		1,96,717	27.21	+15.56
Turnout		7,22,870	42.96	−2.50
INC hold		Swing		

=== 2004 Lok Sabha ===
2004 Indian general elections: Pali
Party	Candidate	Votes	%	±%
BJP	Pusp Jain	2,64,114	48.66	−10.80
INC	Surendra Kumar Surana	200,876	37.01	−2.81
Independent	Madhav Singh Diwan	38,664	7.12	
Independent	Heera Ram	10,784	1.99	
NCP	Meethalal Jain	10,451	1.93	
BSP	Sohan Singh Sankhala	6,368	1.17	+0.63
Independent	Moola Ram	5,969	1.10	
Independent	Lahara Ram Sargara	2,901	0.53	
Independent	Barkat Ali	2,611	0.48	
Majority		63,238	11.65	−7.99
Turnout		542,738	45.46	−4.54
BJP hold		Swing	-10.80	

== See also ==
- Pali district
- List of constituencies of the Lok Sabha
