= Bamne =

Bam, Bamne, Bamera, Bamnet may refer to:

== Places ==
- Bamnera is a small village situated along the inner margin of the southwestern part of the Thar Desert (The Great Indian Desert).
- Bamnet Narong district is a district (amphoe) in the southwestern part of Chaiyaphum province, northeastern Thailand.

== Railway stations ==
- Bamnet Narong railway station is a railway station located in Ban Phet Subdistrict, Bamnet Narong District, Chaiyaphum Province.
