= Bamnera =

- village
- Location in Rajasthan, India Bamnera (India)
- Coordinates: 25.17°N 72.96°E
- Country: India
- State: Rajasthan
- District: Pali

Government
  - Body: Gram Panchayat

Area
  - Total: 3.1 km^{2} (1.2 sq mi)
- Elevation: 221 m (725 ft)

Population (2011)
  - Total: 732
  - Density: 240/km^{2} (610/sq mi)

Languages
  - Official: Marwari, Hindi
- Time zone: UTC+5:30 (IST)
- PIN: 306901
- Telephone code: 02933
- ISO 3166 code: RJ-IN
- Lok Sabha constituency: Pali (Lok Sabha constituency)
- Vidhan Sabha constituency: Sumerpur
- Civic agency: Gram Panchayat
- Avg. annual temperature: 30 °C (86 °F)
- Avg. summer temperature: 44 °C (111 °F)
- Avg. winter temperature: 05 °C (41 °F)

Bamnera is a small village situated in the Sumerpur tehsil of Pali District in the state of Rajasthan, 12.5 km west of Sheoganj-Sirohi District from Beawar-Radhanpur NH 14.

Situated at the foot of 'Dhavalgiri' Hill, locally called, as 'Bhakree' (भाकरी) on the bank of river 'Brahmni', which is a distributary of river 'Sukri', Bamnera is at a distance of 23 km (14.26 miles) from Jawai Bandh, (earlier known as Erinpura Road) railway station on the North Western Railway track. On the way to Bamnera from Sheoganj, the road crosses the Sukri River. This junction is called Fufaat. During monsoons, seasonal rains overflow its banks with a forceful current, and hence it is called Fufaat (Forceful). A concrete bridge called Pakki Rapat (पक्की रपट) is constructed on this river.

== History ==
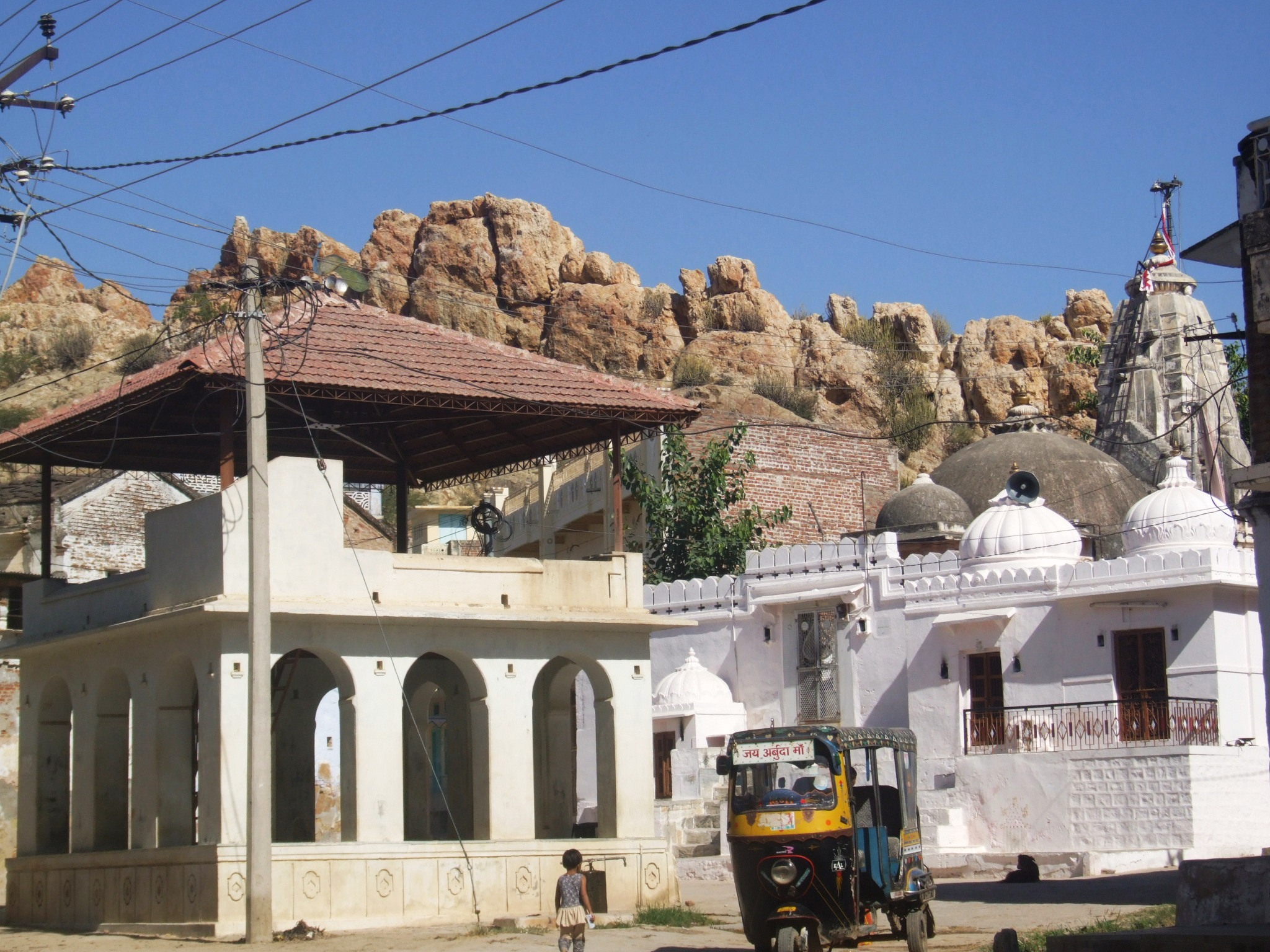
Bamnera view

Bamnera is dominated by a Audichya Sahastra Gorwal Brahmins Brahman community along with other castes such as Rajpurohits, Meenas, Suthars, Kumbhars, Rajputs, Harijans and Saads.

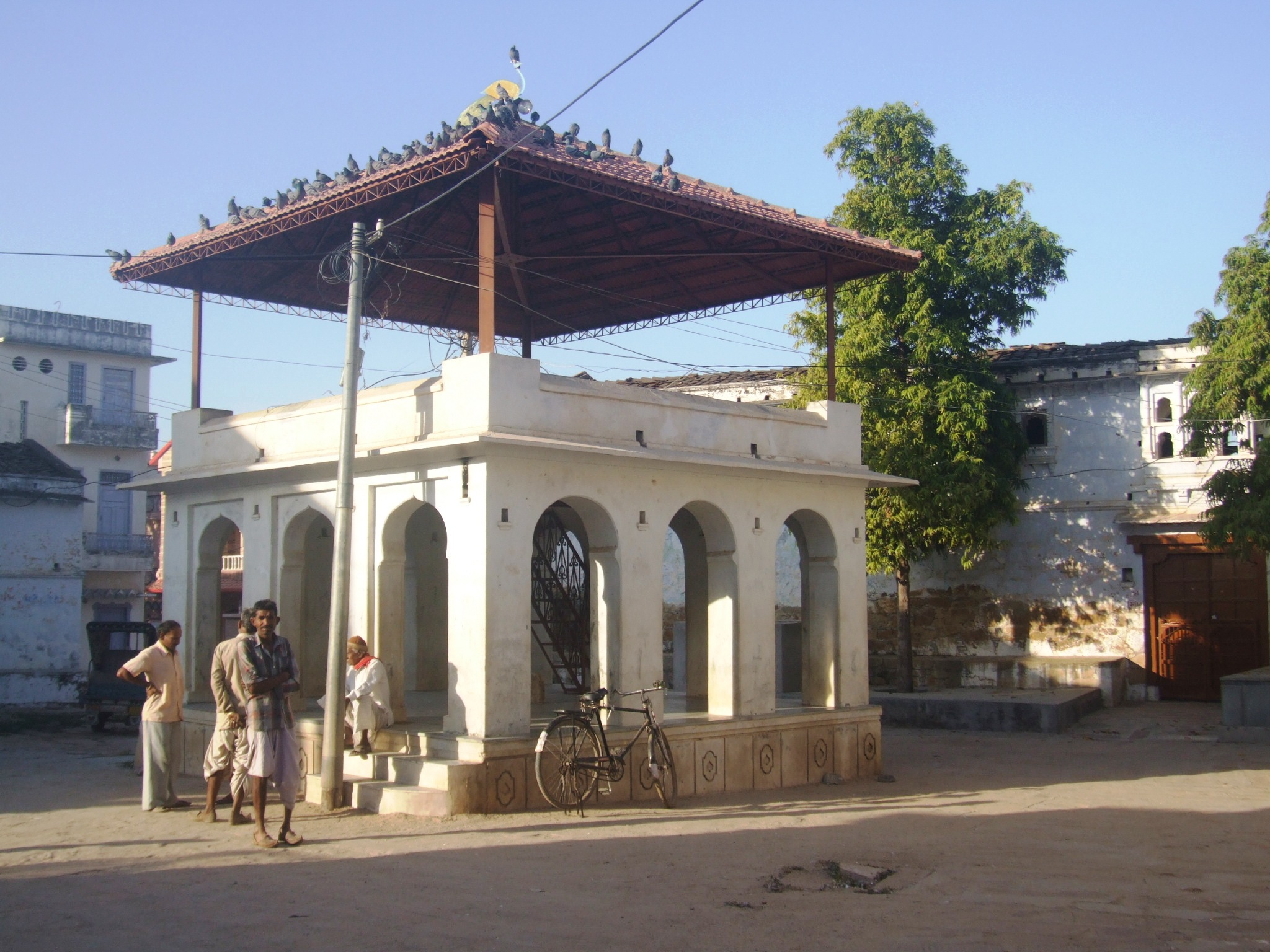
Meeting place

== Demography ==
Bamnera is a medium-sized village located in Sumerpur in Pali district, Rajasthan with a total of 203 resident households. Bamnera has a population of 732 of which 361 are males while 371 are females as per the 2011 census.

In Bamnera village the population of children age 0-6 is 72 which makes up 9.84% of the total population of the village.

Bamnera village has a higher literacy rate than most of Rajasthan. In 2011, the literacy rate of Bamnera was 66.97% compared to 66.11% for Rajasthan as a whole. Male literacy stands at 80.19% while the female literacy rate is 54.30%.

Bamnera has a substantial population of Scheduled Caste. Schedule Caste (SC) constitutes 26.64% while Schedule Tribe (ST) were 16.67% of the total population in Bamnera.

Of total population, 235 were engaged in work activities. 73.19% of workers describe their work as main work (employment or earning more than 6 months) while 26.81% were involved in marginal activity providing livelihood for less than 6 months. Of 235 workers engaged in main work, 25 were cultivators (owner or co-owner) while four were agricultural labourers.

As per constitution of India and Panchyati Raaj Act, Bamnera village is administrated by the sarpanch (head of the village) who is elected representative of the village.

Particulars	Total	Male	Female
Total Houses	203		
Populations	732	361	371
Children (0-6)	72	38	34
Scheduled Caste	195	101	94
Scheduled Tribe	122	66	56
Literacy	66.97%	80.19%	54.30%
Total Workers	235	184	51
Main Worker	172	0	0
Main Worker	63	25	38

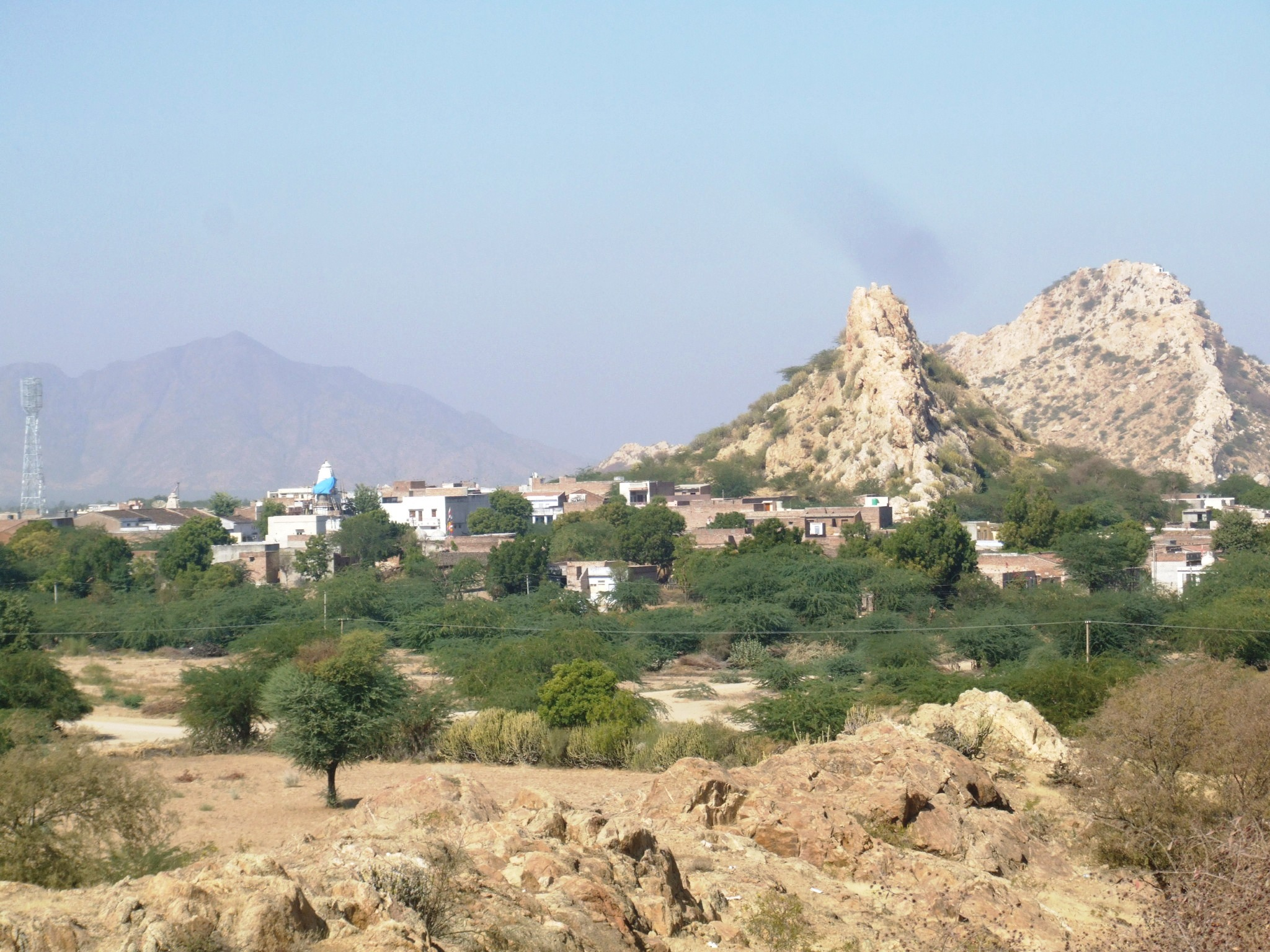
Village view

== Temples ==
On the eastern side of Bamnera, there is a small hill known as Tarwadio Ki Magri, but popularly known as Khimel Bhakri. There are a number of auspicious temples in Bamnera as mentioned below:

1. Charbhujaji Mandir
2. Kedareshwar Mahadev Temple
3. Wagheswer Mahadev Temple
4. Khimel Mata Temple
5. Bhevmata Temple
6. Pimpleshwar Temple
7. Umiya Mata Temple
8. Ramdevpir Temple
9. Suryadev Temple
10. Shri Korthaji tirth Jain Temple or Shri Korta Tirth Jain Mandir
11. Varvesimata Temple
12. Chamunda Mata Temple
13. Shri Brahmani Mata Mandir (Kadarvavi)
14. Shri Aapeshwar Mahadev Temple (Vanvavri)

Monuments, temples and public places in Bamnera and their functions:

Shamalaji/Charbhuja Temple (Dehra) : It is situated in the middle of Bamnera village.

Shri Kedareshwar Mahadev Temple: This is a large temple, though not under the territory of Bamnera, but is still an important holy place for local functions.

Shri Pimpleshwar Temple: It is situated on the bank of Brahmi (Sukadi river) originated from Gautameshwar.

Shri Wagheshwar Temple: It is located on the bank of Jawai river.

Shri Aapeshwar and Koteshwar Temple: These temples are buried in the ground. They are under the restricted area of archaeological Survey of India.

== Amenities ==
Bamnera Village view

Pechka (Peska): This is one of the oldest sources of drinking water. It is situated in the middle of the Brahmi river (Sukadi). Water supply facilities are now provided by Rajasthan Water Supply Department. Presently, its water is used for cattle and other purposes.

Mithibai Rupalal Navalramji Charitable Trust: This trust had built a hospital cum primary health/medical center, which was inaugurated by Ex-Chief Minister, Shri Haridev Joshi.

Bhuralal Dungaji Secondary School: This school by Durgashanker Daulatramji Kevalramji along with other people. The school has pre-primary std 1 to std 10 class and has a large ground for sports.

Nohra (Nuru): Nohra is a place within any village equipped with all the facilities required for catering, cooking and eating arrangements. Bamnera has a huge 'Nohra' but still requires a renovation and better seating arrangement. There is one more 'Nohra'. Though it is comparatively small in size, it is useful in small ceremonies like Yagnopavit and marriages.

Gaushala: Gaushala is managed by Shri. Bamnera Gaurakshak Charitable Trust. Normally, this trust is headed by the active sarpanch.Shri Bamnera Vidhtya Prakashan Mandal and Shri Bamnera Jankalyan Mandal is effectively and efficiently working in the village as well as in Mumbai.

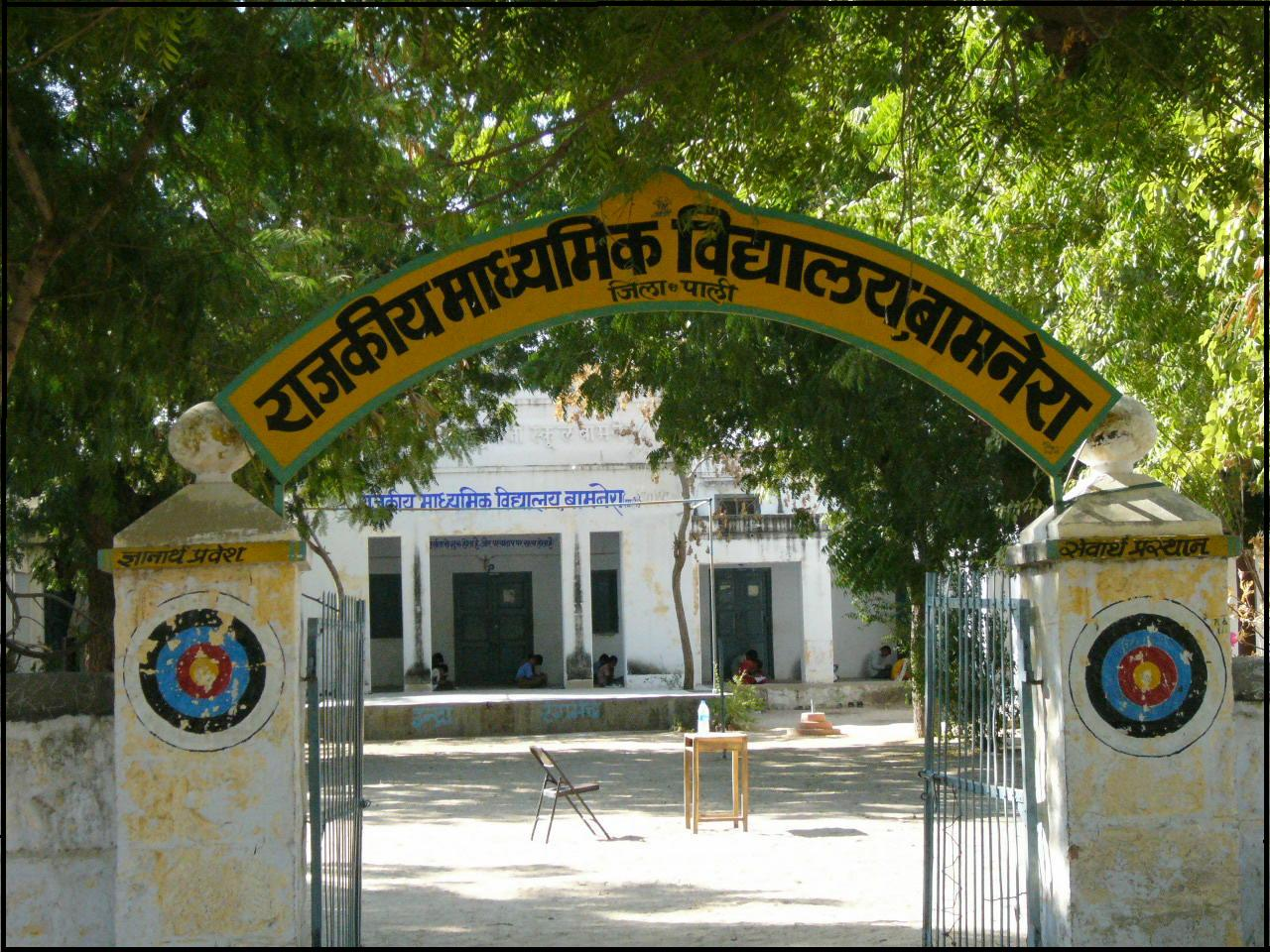
Bamnera Vidyalaya

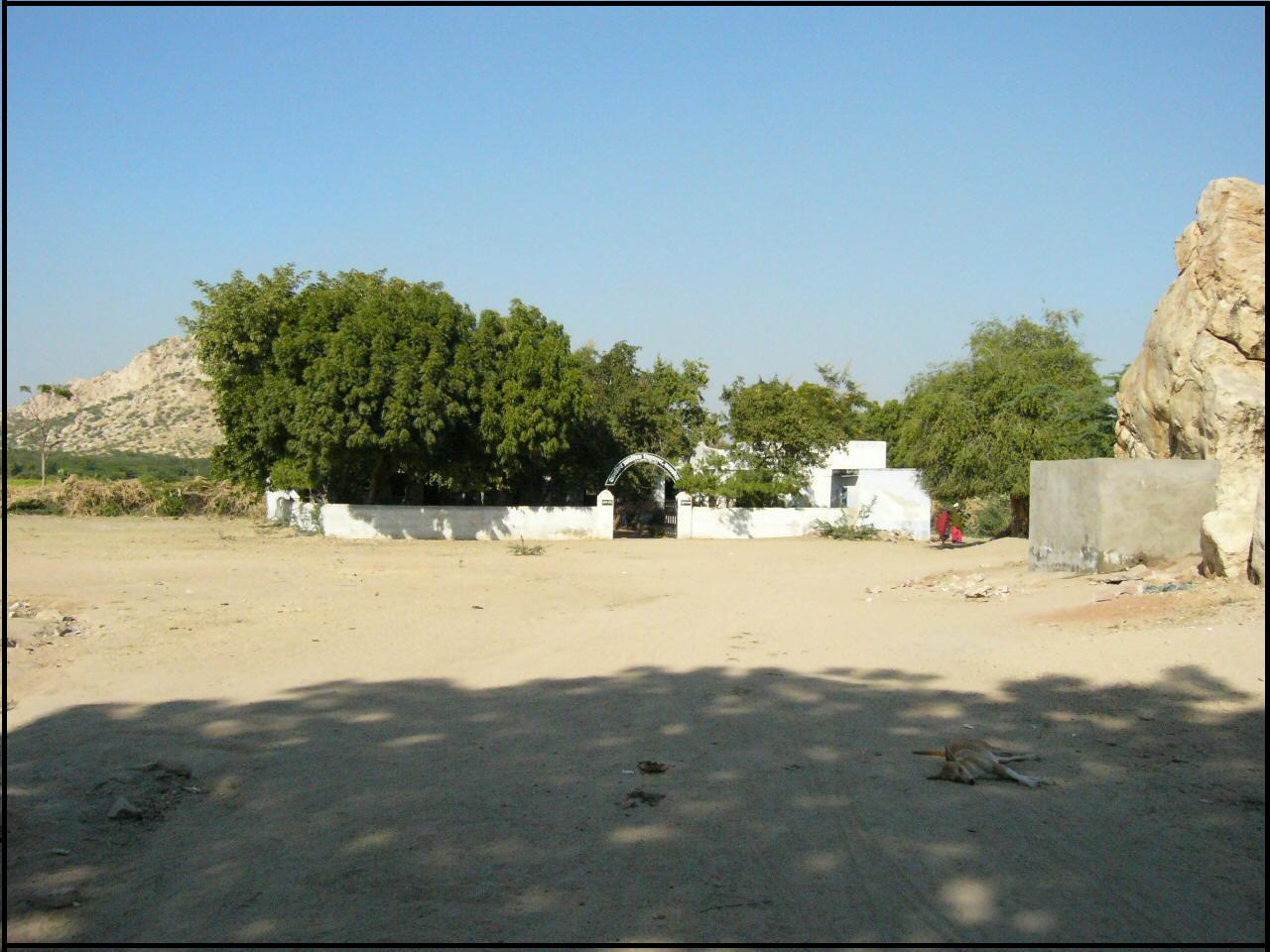
Bamnera Vidyalaya

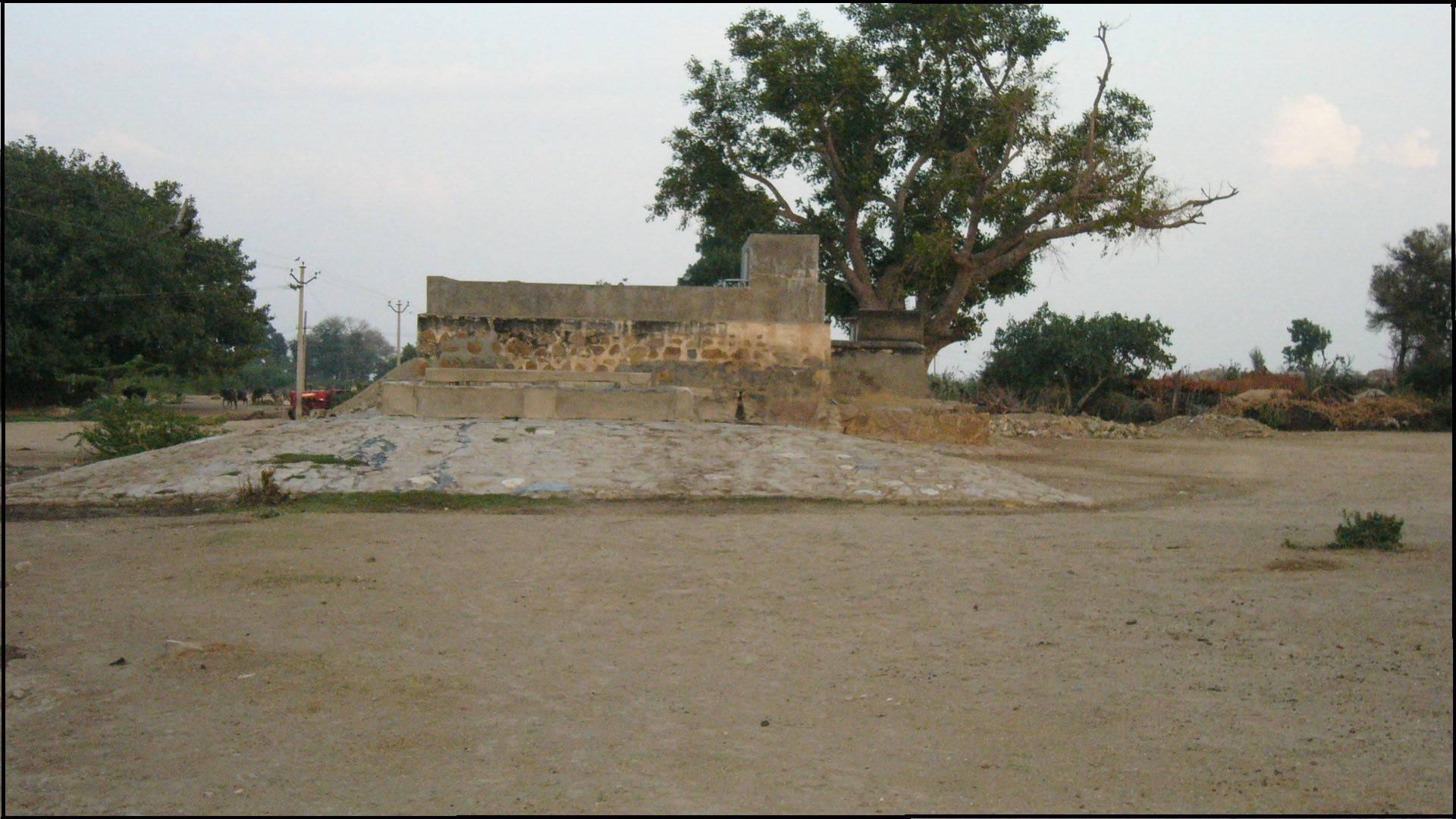
Pechka

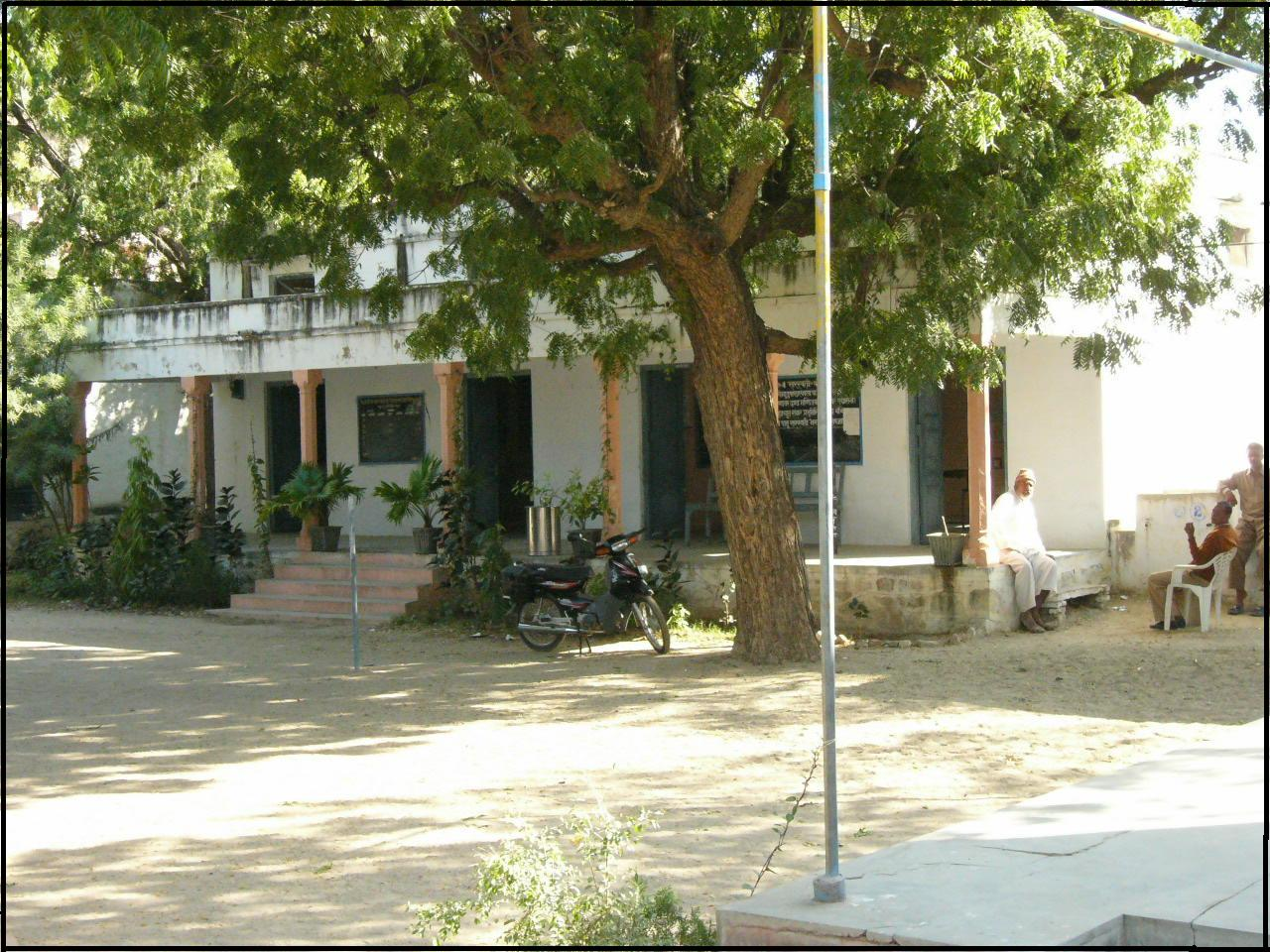
Bamnera School

== Music and entertainment ==
Folk songs are sung by women during marriages and other social occasions. Many villagers own TVs and radios. One can hear sounds of popular native songs in the form of bhajans as well as Hindi music emanating from stereos and other devices during evenings and afternoons from different houses.

== Games and sports ==
Most of the children play cricket, gillidanda, and marbles. Some villagers also play volleyball and football. Villagers can be seen playing cards at the premises of Pimpleshwar Mahadev Mandir. Some children play tass patti of match box.

== Festivals ==
Villagers celebrate all major Hindu festivals including Holi, Deepawali, Makar Shakranti, Raksha Bandhan, and Teez. Villagers celebrate Holi and Dhuleti for 15 days. Most people perform Gair dance in the village. Usually, people spend the day throwing coloured powder and water at each other. A special drink called thandai is prepared, sometimes containing bhang (Cannabis sativa). People invite each other to their houses for feasts and celebrations later in the evening. Unlike others who use longer-lasting and stronger artificial colours, villagers prefer to use coloured powders which have medicinal significance and are traditionally made of neem, kumkum, turmeric, bilva, and other medicinal herbs.

== Economics ==
The main occupations in Bamnera are agriculture, pashupalan and yajamaanvrutti. Like other villages, many local people have migrated from Bamnera to different regions of Maharashtra, Madhya Pradesh and Gujarat in search of better opportunities. Still, local people are engaged in agriculture, teaching and yajamaanvrutti. Some people have also excelled in the field of engineering, medical, banking, computers and IT Technologies. There are several people located in foreign countries as well.

== How to reach Bamnera ==
- By air: The nearest airport is Jodhpur or later on Udaipur.
- By train: The nearest railway station is Jawai Bandh, which is approximately 25 km (16 mi) from Bamnera.
- By road: Rajasthan bus transport services are available from Ahmedabad or the nearest stop is Sheoganj.

Nearby cities and towns

- East: Sheoganj—12 km (7.5 mi), Sumerpur—15 km (9.3 mi)
- North: Takhatgarh—30 km (19 mi)
- West: Jalore District
- South: Sirohi—50 km (31 mi)
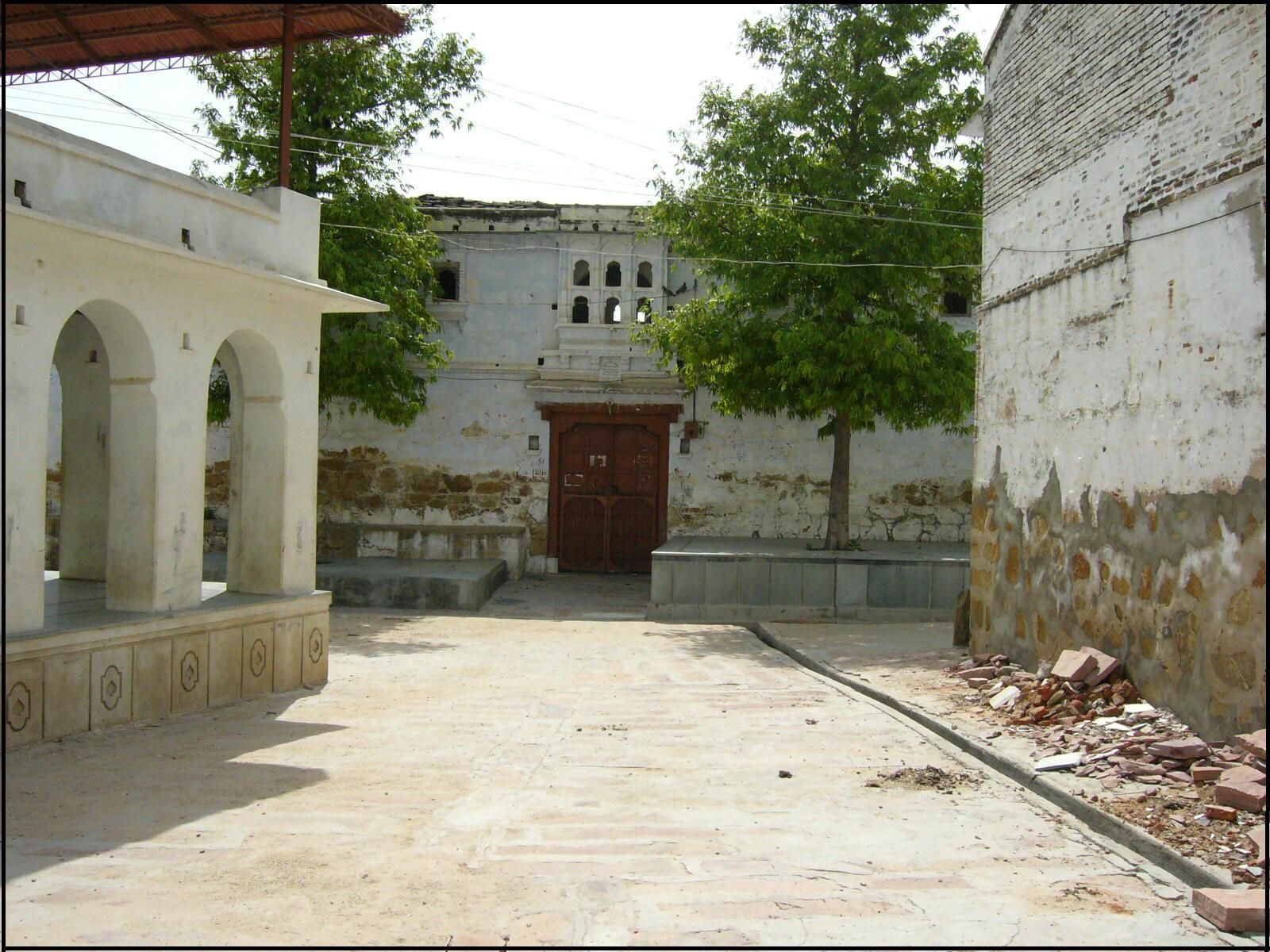
Nohra

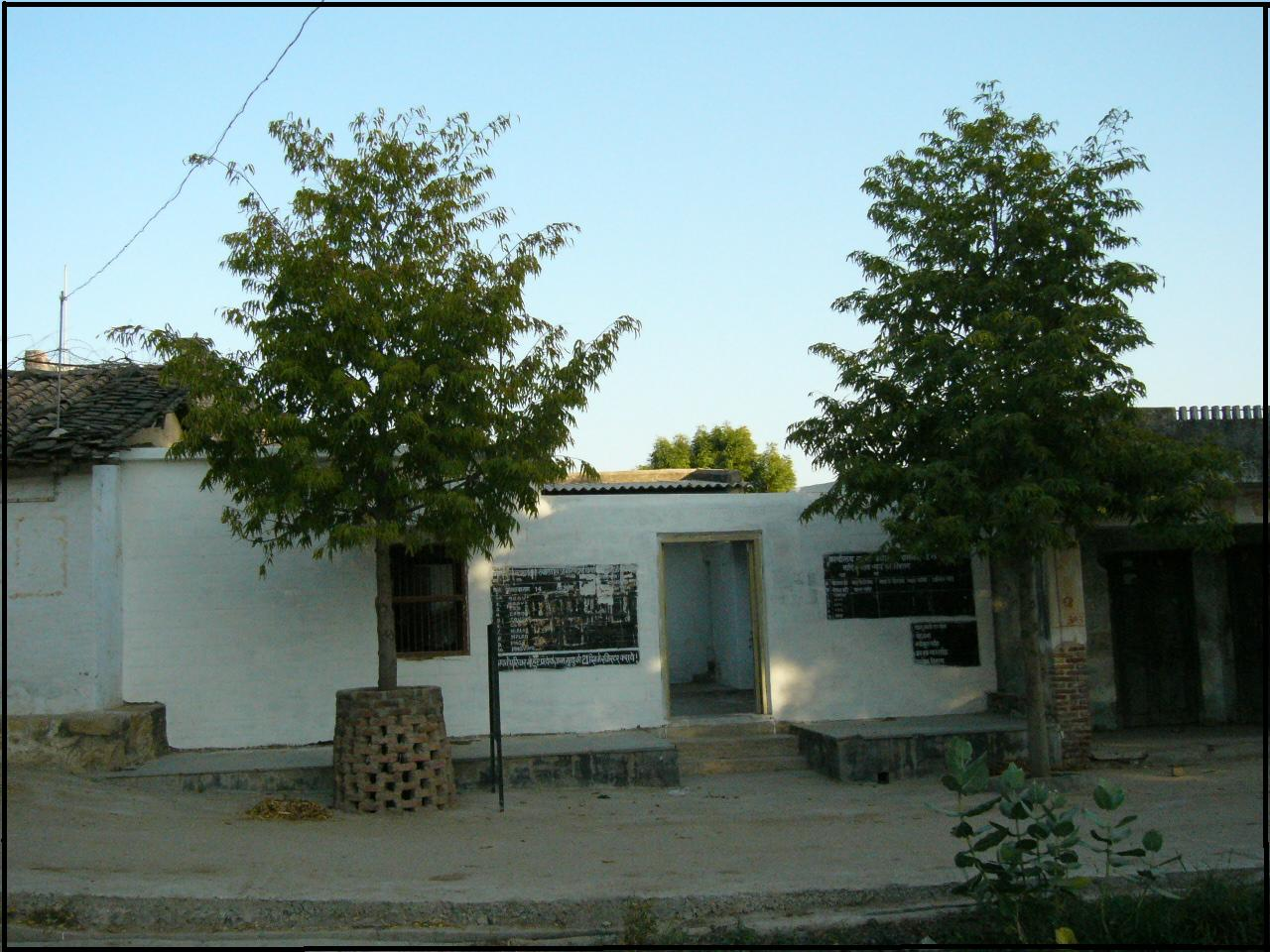
Bamnera village

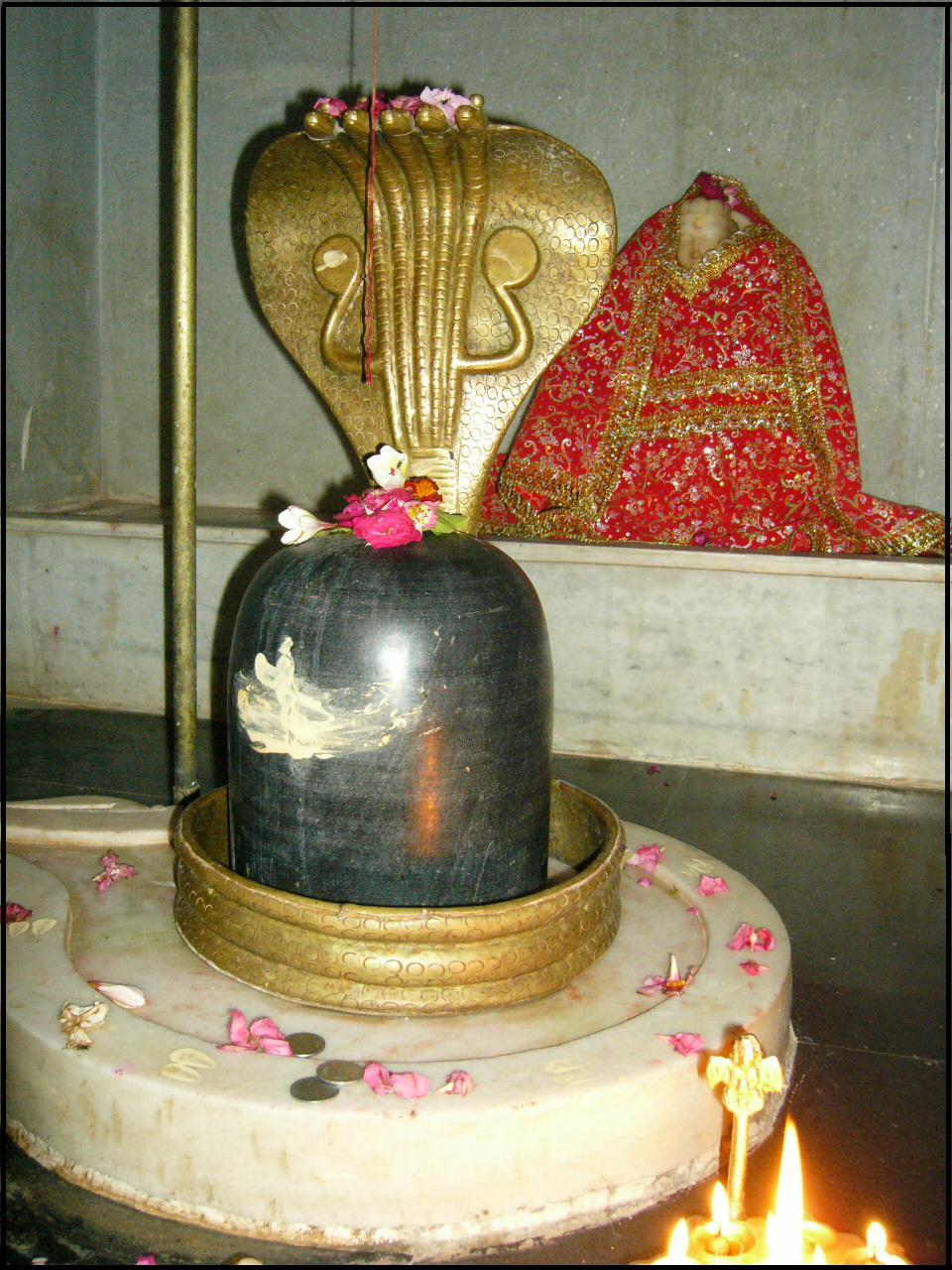
Sri Kedareshwar Mahadev
