= Posalia =

Posaliya
- village
- Location in Rajasthan, India Posaliya (India)
- Coordinates: 25.08°N 72.99°E
- Country: India
- State: Rajasthan
- District: Sirohi
- Talukas: Sheoganj

Government
  - Body: Gram Panchayat
- Elevation: 324 m (1,063 ft)

Population (2001)
  - Total: 6,094

Languages
  - Official: Hindi, Rajasthani
- Time zone: UTC+5:30 (IST)
- Vehicle registration: RJ-24
- Lok Sabha constituency: Jalore (Lok Sabha Constituency)
- Vidhan Sabha constituency: Sheoganj
- Civic agency: Gram Panchayat

Posalia is a village situated in Sheoganj tehsil of Sirohi District of Rajasthan in Western India. Posalia is situated on National Highway No.62 and the nearest railway station is Jawai dam which is 24 km away.

== Demographics ==
According to the 2001 census, the population of Posalia is 6,094. The male population is 3,108 and the female population is 2,986.

== The temples ==
Posalia has a Jain temple of Lord Posali Parshvanath a black marble idol. Nearly 45 cm high, the idol is in the Padmasana posture. The pinnacled temple has nine hoods. There are many tirths whose historical features center round special historical events. There is a document showing that this temple was built by the Sangha in the year 1750. On the idol there is an inscription of the year 1745.

There is a 200-year-old temple of Shiva, which is believed to grant the attendees' wishes, and also a 350-year-old temple.
