= Marwar Junction Assembly constituency =

Legislative Assembly constituency in Rajasthan State, India

Coordinates: 25.73°N 73.61°E

Marwar Junction
- Constituency No. 119 for the Rajasthan Legislative Assembly

Constituency details
- Country: India
- Region: North India
- State: Rajasthan
- District: Pali
- Lok Sabha constituency: Pali
- Established: 2008
- Total electors: 294,959
- Reservation: None

Member of Legislative Assembly
- 16th Rajasthan Legislative Assembly
- Incumbent Kesaram Choudhary
- Party: Bharatiya Janata Party
- Elected year: 2023

Marwar Junction Assembly constituency is one of the 200 Legislative Assembly constituencies of Rajasthan state in India.

It is part of Pali district. As of 2018, it is represented in the Assembly by Kesa Ram Choudhary of the Bharatiya Janata Party.

== Members of the Legislative Assembly ==
Year	Member	Party
2008	Kesaram Choudhary	Bharatiya Janata Party
2013	Kesaram Choudhary	Bharatiya Janata Party
2018	Khushveer Singh Jojawar	Independent
2023	Kesaram Choudhary	Bharatiya Janata Party

== Election results ==
=== 2023 ===
2023 Rajasthan Legislative Assembly election: Marwar Junction
Party	Candidate	Votes	%	±%
BJP	Kesaram Choudhary	99,604	54.64	+18.98
INC	Khushveer Singh	66,583	36.53	+23.74
Independent	Indra Singh	7,084	3.89	
ASP(KR)	Vajaram Parihar	2,808	1.54	
NOTA	None of the above	2,597	1.42	−0.23
Majority		33,021	18.11	+17.96
Turnout		182,293	61.8	+0.99
BJP gain from Independent		Swing		

=== 2018 ===
Rajasthan Legislative Assembly Election, 2018: Marwar Junction
Party	Candidate	Votes	%	±%
Independent	Khushveer Singh	58,921	35.81	
BJP	Kesaram Choudhary	58,670	35.66	
INC	Jasaram Rathore	21,037	12.79	
BSP	Ramhari Meena	10,242	6.23	
Independent	Laxminarayan Dave	7,946	4.83	
NOTA	None of the above	2,719	1.65	
Majority		251	0.15	
Turnout		164,523	60.81	

== See also ==
- List of constituencies of the Rajasthan Legislative Assembly
- Pali district
