= Badri Ram Jakhar =

Indian politician

Member of the Lok Sabha
- In office 2009–2014
- Preceded by: Pusp Jain
- Succeeded by: P. P. Chaudhary
- Constituency: Pali

Personal details
- Born: 9 September 1952 (age 73) Bhopalgarh, Rajasthan, India
- Party: Indian National Congress
- Spouse: Mohini Devi

Badri Ram Jakhar (born 9 September 1952) is an Indian politician who served as member of the 15th Lok Sabha representing Pali constituency. He is a member of the Indian National Congress.
