= Laxmi Mall Singhvi =

Indian jurist, parliamentarian, scholar, writer and diplomat

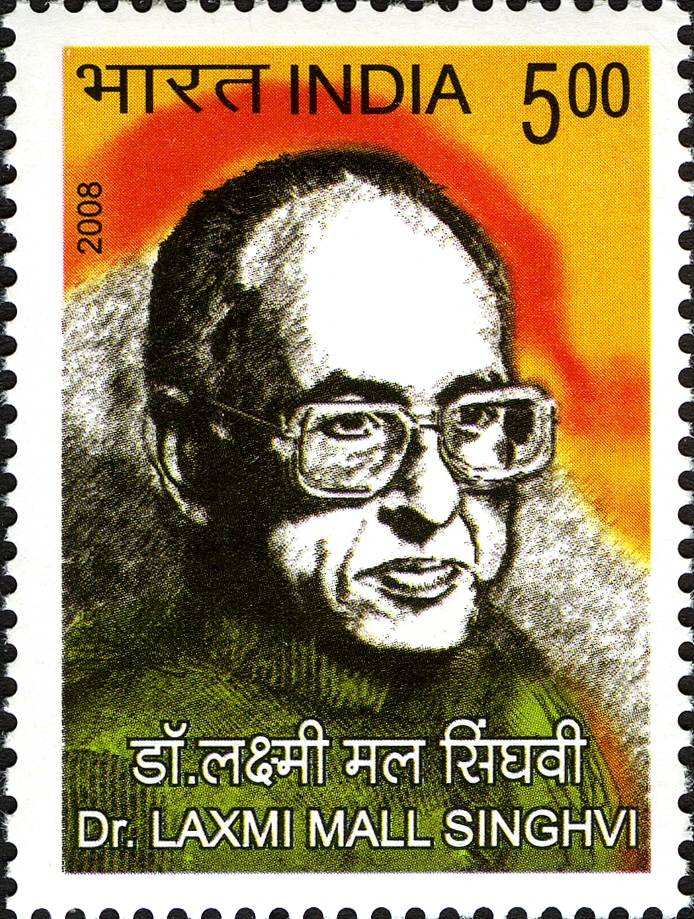

Member of Parliament, Lok Sabha
- In office 1962–1967
- Preceded by: Jaswantraj Mehta
- Succeeded by: Narendra Kumar Sanghi
- Constituency: Jodhpur

Member of Parliament, Rajya Sabha
- In office 1998–2004
- Constituency: Rajastan

Indian High Commissioner to the United Kingdom
- In office 1991–1997
- Prime Minister: P. V. Narasimha Rao
- Preceded by: Kuldip Nayar
- Succeeded by: Salman Haidar

Personal details
- Born: 9 November 1931 Jodhpur, Jodhpur State, British India
- Died: 6 October 2007 (aged 75) New Delhi, India
- Party: Bharatiya Janata Party
- Other political affiliations: Indian National Congress
- Education: Allahabad University (BA); Jaipur University (LLB, MA); Harvard University (LLM); Cornell University (LL.D)
- Occupation: Jurist, writer, diplomat

Laxmi Mall Singhvi (9 November 1931 – 6 October 2007) was an Indian jurist, parliamentarian, scholar, writer and diplomat. He was, after V. K. Krishna Menon, the second-longest-serving High Commissioner for India in the United Kingdom (1991–97). He was conferred with a Padma Bhushan in 1998.

== Biography ==
Singhvi was born in Jodhpur, Rajasthan, India, into a Marwari Jain family. He had two brothers, Prasan Mall Singhvi and Gulab Mall Singhvi, and two sisters, Pushpa Sett and Chandra Bhandari. Singhvi was a gold medallist in BA from Allahabad University and then did LLB & MA from Jaipur University. He was Rajasthan's first Rotary Scholar to Harvard Law School for his LLM. He then did his LL.D from Cornell Law School, USA in two years.

=== Political career ===
Singhvi was drawn to politics as an opponent of radical social agenda championed by Jawaharlal Nehru. Most of the radical legislation was passed during the term of the second Lok Sabha (1957–62). When elections for the third Lok Sabha were held in 1962, Singhvi stood for election as an independent candidate from his hometown, Jodhpur. He won the election by a narrow margin and was elected to Parliament from the Jodhpur constituency.

As MP, he proposed the creation of an independent, statutory vigilance body with investigative powers, tasked with unearthing corruption in government. This proposal was based on his study of the role of the Ombudsman in Scandinavian countries. Singhvi served as a member of the Lok Sabha for five years, but lost the election of 1967 and did not return to Parliament until thirty-one years later.

In 1997, after he returned to India following a long tenure as High Commissioner to the UK, Singhvi formally joined the Bharatiya Janata Party. He was elected the following year to the Rajya Sabha for a term of six years (1998–2004). As MP, he served as Chairman of High Level Committee on Indian Diaspora. He was instrumental in implementing the Vajpayee government's outreach to the Indian diaspora. It was he who conceptualised the idea of holding and annual 'Pravasi Bharatiya Divas' event to promote interaction of NRIs with the Indian government and industry.

=== Diplomatic assignment ===
In 1991, Prime Minister PV Narasimha Rao appointed Singhvi High Commissioner to the Court of St. James. This made him, after VK Krishna Menon, the second longest-serving High Commissioner for India in the United Kingdom (1991–97).

In 1993, during his term as High Commissioner, Singhvi spearheaded the Indian delegation to the United Nations conference on Human Rights in Vienna. The same year, he was invited by the University of Cambridge to deliver the Rede Lecture, the topic being his own book, 'A Tale of Three Cities.'

He was also a member of the Permanent Court of Arbitration at The Hague.

=== Literary career ===
Singhvi wrote several books in both English and Hindi. These include A Tale of three cities, Jain Temples and Bharat aur Hamara Samay ("India and our times"). As a writer, he had a substantial output, and his numerous books are written in a style that can best be termed simple. They are a mix of general information on specific topics ("Jain temples") and of his views on various issues in books with a very general scope ("India and our times"). Singhvi had a lifelong interest in Jain history and culture. He served as president of the Indira Gandhi National Centre for the Arts.

== Awards and recognition ==
In 1993, Dr Singhvi was awarded the Padma Bhushan by Govt. of India, and an honorary degree of LLD by the University of Buckingham.

The Supreme Court of India held the 'First Dr. L.M. Singhvi memorial lecture on 'Law, Technology and Society: Its dynamics’ on 17 January 2009, delivered by Dr. A.P.J. Abdul Kalam, Former President of India.

Using a bequest by the Trustees of the British Indian Golden Jubilee Banquet Fund, "Dr L M Singhvi Visiting Fellowship" is given out by University of Wales and 'Centre of South Asian Studies', University of Cambridge, for visiting student and scholars of Indian nationality.

The School of Constitutional Law at the National Law University, Jodhpur has been named after Dr. L.M Singhvi.

== Personal life ==
Singhvi was married at a very young age to Kamla (née Baid), a lady of his own community and similar background, in a match arranged by their parents.

Their only son, Abhishek Manu Singhvi, is a leading lawyer, statesman and leader of the Congress Party. He is a member of Parliament in India from the Upper House, Rajya Sabha. LM Singhvi's daughter, Abhilasha Singhvi, is engaged in social work as Managing Trustee of Manav Seva Sannidhi, an NGO.

Singhvi died on 6 October 2007 in New Delhi following a brief illness.
