= Mool Chand Daga =

Indian politician (1918–1987)

Member of Parliament, Lok Sabha
- In office 1971–1977
- Preceded by: S K Tapuriah
- Succeeded by: Amrit Nahata
- In office 1980–1987
- Preceded by: Amrit Nahata
- Succeeded by: Shankar Lal Sharma
- Constituency: Pali, Rajasthan.

Personal details
- Born: 1918
- Died: March 1987 (aged 68–69)
- Party: Indian National Congress
- Spouse: Pushpa Devi Daga

Mool Chand Daga (1918 – March 1987) was an Indian politician. He was elected to the Lok Sabha, the lower house of the Parliament of India from Pali, Rajasthan as a member of the Indian National Congress.

Daga died in office in March 1987. The Lok Sabha was adjourned for the day on 11 March as a mark of respect.
