= SS Erinpura =

1911 ocean liner in United Kingdom

Coordinates: 32°40′N 19°53′E

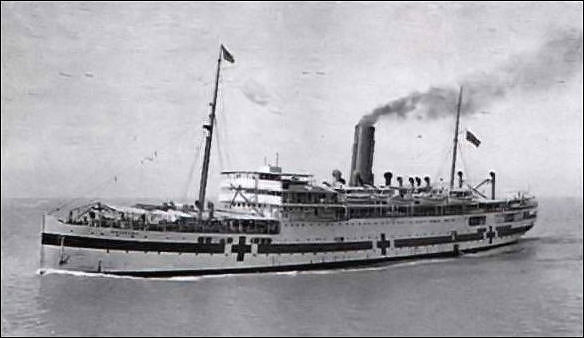
- Erinpura as a First World War hospital ship

History

United Kingdom
- Name: Erinpura
- Namesake: Erinpura
- Owner: British India Steam Nav Co
- Port of registry: Glasgow
- Builder: William Denny & Bros, Dumbarton
- Cost: £108,606
- Yard number: 945
- Launched: 9 October 1911
- Completed: 6 December 1911
- Identification: UK official number 312998; Code letters KPWS (until 1933); Call sign MVJ (until 1933); Call sign GJWN (from 1934)
- Fate: Sunk by air attack, 1 May 1943

General characteristics
- Class & type: E-class ocean liner
- Tonnage: 5,128 GRT; 2,759 NRT; 4,750 DWT
- Length: 411.0 ft (125.27 m)
- Beam: 52.5 ft (16.00 m)
- Draught: 23 ft 5 in (7.14 m)
- Depth: 24.7 ft (7.53 m)
- Decks: 2
- Installed power: 1,059 NHP; 6,657 IHP
- Propulsion: Two triple expansion engines; Two screws
- Speed: 16.7 knots (30.9 km/h)
- Capacity: Passengers: 51 first class; 39 second class; 2,359 deck
- Crew: 26 Officers; 84 Ratings

SS Erinpura was an E-class ocean liner of the British India Steam Navigation Company, built in 1911. She was the first British India ship built for Eastern service to be fitted with radio. She served in both World Wars. Enemy action in 1943 sank her in the Mediterranean Sea with great loss of life.

== Building ==
William Denny and Brothers built Erinpura in Dumbarton, Scotland, for £108,606. Her yard number was 945. She was launched on 9 October and completed on 6 December. She was named after Erinpura, a village in Rajasthan.

Erinpura had twin screws. Each was driven by a three-cylinder triple expansion engine. Between them the two engines developed a total of 1,059 NHP or 6,657 IHP, giving her a speed of 16.7 knots (30.9 km/h).

Her owners registered Erinpura at Glasgow. Her UK official number was 312998 and her code letters were KPWS. By 1914 she was equipped for wireless telegraphy. Her call sign was MVJ.

Erinpura was one of seven sister ships called the E-class. Four different shipyards built them for the Bay of Bengal – Singapore Straits service. Her sisters were Ellenga, Edavana, Elephanta, Egra, Ellora and Ekma. Erinpura was the sixth to be completed. The E class was one of the most successful, profitable and longest-lasting in the history of British India.

== First World War ==
Erinpura was a troop ship early in the First World War, carrying troops from Karachi to Marseille, and then to Sanniya in Mesopotamia (now Iraq). On 24 December 1914 she ran aground in the Red Sea on Muhanrah Bar, off the Hanish Islands, en route to Abadan. She sustained some damage, but was able to return to Bombay.

She made several more trooping voyages until becoming a hospital ship in August 1915, supporting the Indian Expeditionary Force with 475 beds and 104 medical staff. She served on the Basra – Bombay Service, and from November 1917 was used as an ambulance transport.

== Between the wars ==
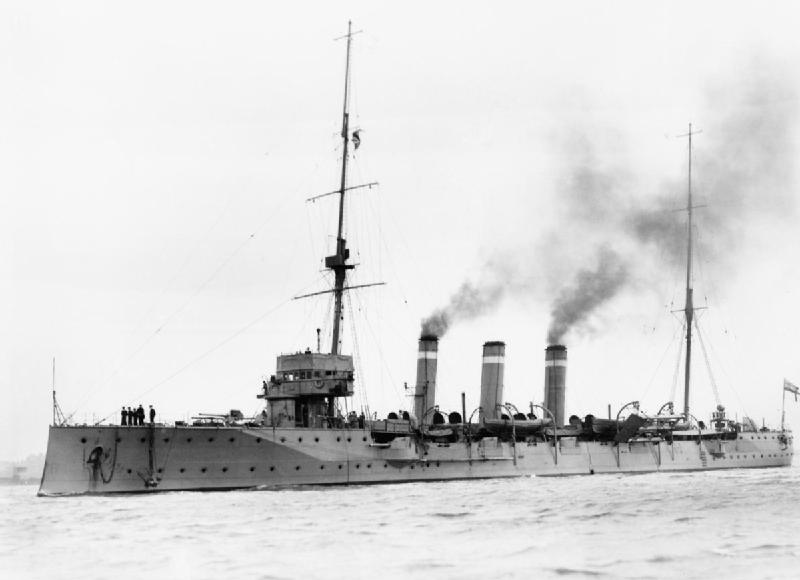
When Erinpura grounded in 1919, HMS Topaze rescued her passengers and troops.

On 15 June 1919 Erinpura again ran aground in the Red Sea, this time on the Mushejera Reef. The Topaze-class cruiser HMS Topaze took off her passengers and troops and took them to Aden. Attempts to free Erinpura failed, and in 1920 bad weather moving her to and fro on the reef damaged her hull. In September 1920 her owners decided to have her cut in two just forward of her bridge. Her bow was left stuck on the reef, and the rest of the ship was towed to Aden.

Dennys built a new bow in Dumbarton and sent it to Bombay. In 1921 Erinpura was towed to Bombay, where her new bow was fitted. In 1923 she returned to service, based in the Bay of Bengal.

In 1934 there was an international reorganisation of code letters and wireless call signs. Erinpura was given the new call sign GJWN, which also superseded her original code letters.

== Second World War ==
In 1938 Erinpura was called up during the Sudetenland crisis. In March 1940 she was requisitioned for the Liner Division. She continued to operate in the Indian Ocean until April 1943, when she passed through the Suez Canal to the Mediterranean, where she steamed from Alexandria to Tripoli and back.

On 29 April 1943 Erinpura left Alexandria in Convoy MW 27 to Malta. Captain PV Cotter commanded Erinpura, which was the Commodore's ship for the convoy. She was carrying more than 1,000 troops, including Basuto and Batswanan members of the African Auxiliary Pioneer Corps, and Palestinian Jewish soldiers of 462 Transport Company of the British Army.

She was one of 20 merchant ships in MW 27, along with her sister ship Egra and two other British India SN Co ships. Six Royal Navy destroyers, four Hellenic Navy destroyers and two Royal Navy minesweepers escorted the convoy.

On the evening of 1 May 1943, German bomber aircraft attacked the convoy 30 nautical miles (56 km) north of Benghazi. The ships took evasive action and returned fire. A Heinkel He 111 torpedoed a BTC tanker, the 8,466 GRT British Trust, which caught fire and sank in three minutes, killing 10 of her crew.

In the next wave of the attack, a bomb hit Erinpura in one of her forward holds, causing her to list to starboard and sink within four or five minutes. The DEMS crew of her 12-pounder anti-aircraft gun continued to return fire until she sank. More than 800 people aboard Erinpura were killed. Accounts differ as to numbers, but one counts the dead as 633 Basuto pioneers, 140 Palestinian Jewish soldiers, 11 Batswanan pioneers, 54 of Erinpura's Indian lascar crew, six DEMS gunners and two engineer officers.

== Monument ==
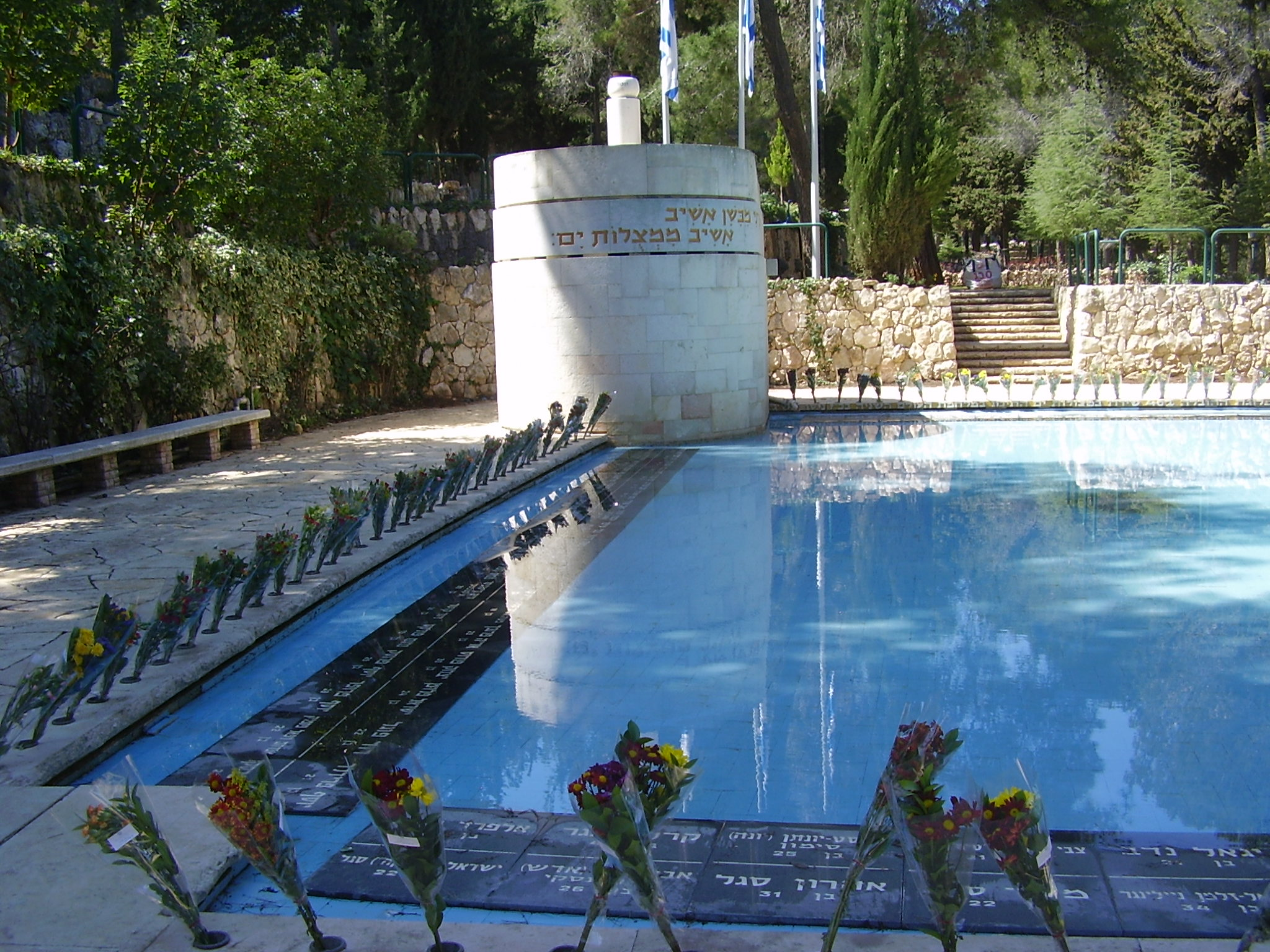
Memorial on Mount Herzl

There is a monument on Mount Herzl to the 140 Jewish soldiers who drowned aboard Erinpura. The monument is shaped like a ship containing a central pool, on the bottom of which are the names of the fallen. Above the pool is a turret adorned with the Hebrew text of Psalm 68, verse 22: "The Lord said, I will bring again from Bashan, I will bring my people again from the depths of the sea."

In the Hebrew calendar the day on which Erinpura sank is 26 Nisan, a day before Yom HaShoah. The memorial ceremony is therefore held every year on Yom HaShoah. Also, a ceremony is held every Yom HaZikaron by the Modi'in Jerusalem chapter of the Hebrew Scouts Movement in Israel at the Erinpura monument, which is attended by the chapter graduates, families of fallen soldiers from Modi'in, and the general public.
