= One Nation, One Election =

Proposed Indian electoral scheduling policy

One Nation, One Election (abbr. ONOE), is a proposal under consideration by the Government of India to synchronise all elections in the country either on a single day or within a specific time frame, with an objective of cutting election cost. One of its most notable proposals is to simultaneously conduct elections to the Lok Sabha & state legislative assemblies of all twenty-eight states and eight union territories. For the purpose of ONOE, Minister of Law and Justice Arjun Ram Meghwal introduced The Constitution (129th Amendment) Bill, 2024 in Lok Sabha on 17 December 2024 to amend the Constitution of India. The bill was referred to Joint Parliamentary Committee on 19 December 2024.

== History ==
The first few general elections of post-Indian independence were held simultaneously with the state legislative assembly elections. While the practice continued till 1967, the system of simultaneous elections was disrupted in 1968 and 1969 due to the premature dissolution of some state assemblies. Since 2014, Narendra Modi, who was then Chief Minister of Gujarat, has been espousing simultaneous elections stating that it will reduce wastage of public money and will ensure the smooth flow of development work, which otherwise gets arrested when the model code of conduct is in force. In India’s immediate neighbourhood, simultaneous polls for the national parliament alongside state legislatures are held in Pakistan, while Nepal conducts simultaneous elections in all 3 levels of the government (parliamentary, provincial & local) since the adoption of its new constitution in 2015. Elsewhere, Sweden hold elections to all 3 levels of the government simultaneously, whereas Belgium holds its parliamentary & provincial elections simultaneously with the EU elections.

In August 2018, the Law Commission of India released its draft report on simultaneously holding all direct elections in the country beginning from the panchayats upto the Lok Sabha within a given time period of a single year. (Note: Elections to the Rajya Sabha, vice-presidential elections & presidential elections are the only indirect elections in India. However, MLAs elect the Rajya Sabha MPs for their respective states, who in turn elect the President & Vice-President. Hence the outcome of indirect elections are also affected by results of the direct elections.) In order to conduct such simultaneous elections, it said that there needs to be made appropriate amendments to the Constitution, the Representation of the People Act 1951, and the Rules of Procedure of Lok Sabha and state Assemblies. The commission also recommended that the amendments receive ratification from at least 50% of the states. With respect to the advantages of holding simultaneous polls, the commission said that it will lead to the saving of public money, reducing the strain on the administrative setup and security forces, timely implementation of government policies, and administrative focus on development activities rather than electioneering.

== High-Level committee ==
High Level Committee
- High Level Committee on One Nation One Election
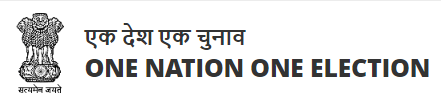
- Formation: September 2, 2023; 3 years ago
- Headquarters: New Delhi
- Secretary General: Dr. Niten Chandra
- Chairman of the Committee: Ramnath Kovind
- Key people: Amit Shah; Ghulam Nabi Azad; N.K Singh; Dr. Subhash C.Kashyap; Harish Salve; Sanjay Kothari; Arjun Ram Meghwal
- Parent organization: Government of India
- Website: https://onoe.gov.in/

On 2 September 2023, the Government of India issued a notification constituting a high-level committee to examine the issue of simultaneous elections. This notification states:

"WHEREAS elections to the House of the People and Legislative Assemblies of States were mostly held simultaneously from 1951-52 to 1967 after which this cycle got broken and now, elections are held almost every year and within a year too at different times, which result in massive expenditure by the Government and other stakeholders, diversion of security forces and other electoral officers engaged in such elections from their primary duties for significantly prolonged periods, disruption in developmental work on account of prolonged application of Model Code of Conduct, etc.;
AND WHEREAS the Law Commission of India in its 170th Report on Reforms of the Electoral Laws observed that: "This cycle of elections every year, and in the out of season, should be put an end to. We must go back to the situation where the elections to Lok Sabha and all the Legislative Assemblies are held at once. It is true that we cannot conceive or provide for all the situations and eventualities that may arise whether on account of the use of Article 356 (which of course has come down substantially after the decision of Supreme Court in S.R. Bommai vs Government of India) or for other reasons, yet the holding of a separate election to a Legislative Assembly should be an exception and not the rule. The rule ought to be 'one election once in five years for Lok Sabha and all the Legislative Assemblies'.";
AND WHEREAS the Department-related Parliamentary Standing Committee on Personnel, Public Grievances, Law and Justice in its 79th Report on 'Feasibility of Holding Simultaneous Election to the House of People (Lok Sabha) and State Legislative Assemblies' submitted in December, 2015 has also examined the matter and recommended an alternative and practical method of holding simultaneous elections in two phases;
NOW, THEREFORE, in view of the above and that in the national interest it is desirable to have simultaneous elections in the country, the Government of India hereby constitutes a High Level Committee [hereinafter referred to as 'HLC'] to examine the issue of simultaneous elections and make recommendations for holding simultaneous elections in the country."

This committee has been constituted under the chairmanship of former President of India Ram Nath Kovind. Other members of this committee are:

- Amit Shah, Central Home Minister
- Arjun Ram Meghwal, Central Law Minister
- Adhir Ranjan Chowdhury, parliamentary leader of the Indian National Congress (the largest party in the Opposition) in Lok Sabha
- Ghulam Nabi Azad, former Leader of Opposition in Rajya Sabha
- NK Singh, Chairman of the 15th Finance Commission
- Dr Subhash C Kashyap, former Secretary General of Lok Sabha
- Harish Salve, senior advocate of the Supreme Court
- Sanjay Kothari, former Chief Vigilance Commissioner

On 14 March 2024, former President Ram Nath Kovind submitted the 18,000 pages long final report prepared by the committee to the incumbent President of India, Draupadi Murmu. Among many things, the report suggested

- Setting up an 'Appointed Date' after the upcoming general elections to mark the new electoral cycle from 2029. This will require extending the term of those state legislative assemblies which are due to expire before this date & prematurely dissolve others whose 5-year term extend beyond this date.
- A total of 18 amendments to the Constitution, most importantly Article 83 (concerning duration of the Houses of the Parliament) & Article 172 (concerning duration of the state legislative assemblies) are required.
- States are required to ratify amendments to Article 324A (to allow simultaneous elections in panchayats & municipal bodies) & Article 325 (to empower the Election Commission of India for creating a common electoral roll & voter IDs with the help of the state election commissions) passed by the Parliament.

The Committee also sought legal advice from 4 former CJIs, 3 former Chief Justices of state High Courts & 1 former CEC. 21,558 responses from the public were also recorded, out of which the Law Ministry reported that 81% were in favour of the proposal.

== Reactions ==
Central Parliamentary Affairs Minister Pralhad Joshi said that once the committee submits its report, it will be discussed in the public domain and Parliament. He said "There is nothing to be nervous about, as discussions will be held. We are the world's largest democracy and we are known as the mother of democracy. This is the evolution of democracy in the mother of democracy."

Chief Election Commissioner of India Rajiv Kumar said that the Commission is ready to conduct elections as per legal provisions.

Many opposition parties have vociferously opposed the plan, citing that this would be disadvantageous for the multiple regional parties of India & would also require nationwide abolition of the provision of moving the no-confidence motion. Many smaller regional opposition parties described the move as an attempt by Modi's Hindu right wing Bharatiya Janata Party of consolidating power by moving towards a presidential form of government at the cost of eroding the current federal system of governance & to convert the country from a multi-party democracy into a one-party state. The opposition parties have also stated that this move will reduce accountability of the government to the public. The Indian National Congress quipped that Modi was preparing for a 'One Nation, No Election' scenario through this proposal.

Calling his inclusion a "total eyewash", Congress leader Adhir Ranjan Chowdhury said he cannot be part of the committee, as the "terms of reference" of the committee "have been prepared in a manner to guarantee its conclusions." Congress leader P. Chidambaram said that the government was accelerating the process with the appointment of a "puppet committee." He said that by combining national and state elections, the BJP hopes to win the Lok Sabha poll with a two-third majority and win enough states in order to implement on ground sweeping changes to the Constitution. Former law minister Kapil Sibal said that "One Nation One Election will be the downfall of the Modi government". He said the Modi government is playing with fire and they will not simply singe their hands but destroy the government.

== Future ==
In the 2024 general elections, the BJP led NDA was decreased from 353 to 293 seats in the Lok Sabha, with the BJP itself being reduced from 303 to 240 seats. The INDIA led by the Indian National Congress & consisting of regional parties like SP, AITC, DMK & RJD which are opposed to simultaneous polls, won 233 seats. Since amendments to the Constitution required for implementing simultaneous polls can be done only after securing at least two-thirds supermajority in both Houses of the Parliament (362 in Lok Sabha and 167 in Rajya Sabha), very little to no progress on this proposal is to be made for the upcoming future.

Despite this, on 18 September 2024, the Modi cabinet approved the 'One Nation, One Election' bill which was scheduled to be brought before the Parliament on the 2024 Winter session. The bill was introduced in the Lok Sabha on 17 December 2024. A division vote was followed, where 269 members supported the move and 198 opposed it.

The Opposition INDIA bloc strongly objected to the Bill, arguing that the government failed to secure the required two-thirds majority for such measures. However, parliamentary procedures suggest that a special majority may not be required for introducing Constitutional Amendment Bills.

== 2029 simultaneous election proposal ==
The NDA is exploring holding Assembly elections in 22 NDA-ruled states and Union Territories alongside the 2029 Lok Sabha elections, instead of waiting until 2034 Lok Sabha elections. The proposal may require the early dissolution of some state assemblies to align their electoral cycles with the general election.The move comes as the Joint Parliamentary Committee (JPC) continues consultations on the One Nation, One Election Bills. JPC chairman P. P. Chaudhary has indicated that the panel is examining mechanisms including interacting with Chief Ministers across states to make simultaneous elections feasible by 2029.

== JPC Members ==
The Lok Sabha approved a 39-member joint parliamentary committee (JPC) to examine The Constitution (One Hundred and Twenty-Ninth Amendment) Bill, 2024 and the amendments to the Government of Union Territories Act, 1963, the twin bills that aim to usher in simultaneous state and national elections. BJP MP P. P. Chaudhary has been appointed as the chairperson of the committee.

The panel, earlier planned for 31 members, will now have 39 members after some smaller parties met Lok Sabha Speaker Om Birla and demanded their inclusion in the important committee. There are 27 Lok Sabha MPs and 12 Rajya Sabha lawmakers in it.

List of Members of Joint Parliamentary Committee
Government Members	Party	Opposition Members	Party
P. P. Chaudhary	BJP	Sanjay Singh	AAP
Sambit Patra	BJP	Y. V. Subba Reddy	YSRCP
Anurag Thakur	BJP	P. Wilson	DMK
Anil Baluni	BJP	Mukul Wasnik	INC
Baijayant Panda	BJP	Supriya Sule	NCP–SP
C. M. Ramesh	BJP	Saket Gokhale	AITC
Vishnu Dayal Ram	BJP	Dharmendra Yadav	SP
Vishnu Datt Sharma	BJP	K. Radhakrishnan	CPI(M)
Bhartruhari Mahtab	BJP	Manish Tewari	INC
Parshottam Rupala	BJP	Kalyan Banerjee	AITC
Bhubaneswar Kalita	BJP	Manas Mangaraj	BJD
K. Laxman	BJP	Anil Desai	SS(UBT)
Ghanshyam Tiwari	BJP	Priyanka Gandhi	INC
Sanjay Jaiswal	BJP	Randeep Surjewala	INC
Bansuri Swaraj	BJP	Chhotelal Kharwar	SP
Kavita Patidar	BJP	Sukhdeo Bhagat	INC
Sanjay Kumar Jha	JD(U)	T. M. Selvaganapathy	DMK
Shrikant Shinde	SHS	V. Vijayasai Reddy (Resigned)	YSRCP
Shambhavi Choudhary	LJP(RV)		
Ganti Harish Madhur	TDP		
Vallabhaneni Balashowry	JSP		

== See also ==
- Combined Approval Voting
- Delimitation Bill, 2026
- None Of The Above (NOTA) in India
- Premiership of Narendra Modi
- Uniform Civil Code
