= Katy Mirza =

Model and actress (1950–2017)

- Born: Katiya Mirza; 1950; Aden
- Died: 18 March 2017 (aged 66–67); London, United Kingdom
- Occupations: Model, actress
- Known for: First Playboy Bunny of Indian descent
- Children: 1

Katy Mirza (born Katiya Mirza; 1950 – 18 March 2017), was a model and actress. She gained international recognition in the 1970s as a Playboy Bunny at the Playboy Club in London, becoming one of the few women of Indian descent to do so. Following her stint in London, she moved to Bombay to pursue a career in Bollywood, appearing in films such as Kissa Kursi Ka (1978) and Kasme Vaade (1978).

== Early life ==
Katiya Mirza was born in 1950 in Aden (modern-day Yemen) to the family of an Indian income tax commissioner. Her family relocated to the United Kingdom in the late 1960s. In 1972–73, she was studying to be a graphic designer in London. She then took a job as a receptionist at the London Hilton Hotel.

== Career ==
=== Playboy and London years ===
While working at the Hilton, Mirza was scouted by a Playboy Club employee and invited to audition. After meeting Hugh Hefner, she was hired as a Playboy Bunny in 1973, working at the London Playboy Club. She then frequently appeared on magazine covers and in photo spreads, becoming known for being an Asian woman in the London club scene.

=== Bollywood and television ===
Mirza's international fame led to offers from the Indian film industry. She moved to Bombay, where she worked for approximately seven years. In 1978, she played the role of Ruby, a politician's secretary, in the political satire Kissa Kursi Ka. She also appeared in the Amitabh Bachchan starrer Kasme Vaade (1978) and had minor roles in films like Chalta Purza (1977).

Despite her high profile, Mirza struggled to secure leading roles and was often offered roles in B-grade films. She continued to model and appeared in television productions, including an episode of The Garland (1981) and The Magician of Samarkand (2006).

== Personal life ==
Rumours suggested that she was in a relationship with Hussein bin Talal, then King of Jordan.

It was also rumoured that she had got her breast size surgically reduced by 10 inches. Shobhaa De referred to this as "Operation Bust" in her column, "Eyecatchers", in India Today in 1978.

Mirza was a single mother and had a son named Firoz. She maintained a home in Sussex and an apartment in Juhu, Mumbai, which she visited frequently throughout her life.

== Death ==
Mirza died of cancer on 18 March 2017 at her home in central London at the age of 67. Her remains were cremated.
