= Jaswantraj Mehta =

Indian politician

Member of Parliament, Lok Sabha
- In office 1962–1967
- Preceded by: Harish Chandra Mathur
- Succeeded by: S K Tapuriah
- Constituency: Pali, Rajasthan.
- In office 1952-1962
- Succeeded by: L. M. Singhvi
- Constituency: Jodhpur, Rajasthan.

Personal details
- Born: 16 November 1898
- Party: Indian National Congress
- Spouse: Chand Kanwar

Jaswantraj Mehta was an Indian politician. He was elected to the Lok Sabha, the lower house of the Parliament of India from Pali, Rajasthan as a member of the Indian National Congress.
