= Bheem Raj Bhati =

Indian politician

Member of the Rajasthan Legislative Assembly
- Incumbent
- Assumed office 3 December 2023
- Preceded by: Gyanchand Parakh
- Constituency: Pali

Bheem Raj Bhati (born 1947) is an Indian politician from Rajasthan. He is a member of the Rajasthan Legislative Assembly from Pali Assembly constituency in Pali district. He won the 2023 Rajasthan Legislative Assembly election representing the Indian National Congress.

== Early life and education ==
Bhati is from Pali, Rajasthan. He is the son of late Poonamchandji Bhati. He completed his B.E. in mechanical engineering in 1969 at Birla Institute of Technology and Science, Pilani.

== Career ==
Bhati won from Pali Assembly constituency representing the Indian National Congress in the 2023 Rajasthan Legislative Assembly election. He polled 95,092 votes and defeated his nearest rival and five time MLA, Gyanchand Parakh of the Bharatiya Janata Party, by a margin of 7,888 votes. He first became an MLA winning the 1993 Rajasthan Legislative Assembly election as an independent candidate from the same seat. In the 2018 Rajasthan Legislative Assembly election he contested as an independent candidate after he was denied a Congress ticket but lost to Parakh again and the Indian National Congress candidate Mahaveer Singh Sukarlai finished third. He lost the 2013 Rajasthan Legislative Assembly election as a Congress candidate, also to Parakh.
