= Kesri Singh Mundiyar =

Indian author and politician

Thakur Kesri Singh Mundiyar

Member of Rajasthan Legislative Assembly
- In office 1962–1967
- Preceded by: Mool Chand
- Succeeded by: M Chand
- Constituency: Pali

General Secretary of the Swatantra Party
- Preceded by: Office established

Vice President of Bharatiya Janata Party
- Works: Works

Personal details
- Born: 1 June 1927
- Party: Swatantra Party
- Other political affiliations: Bhartiya Janata Party
- Relations: Ramnathji Ratnu (maternal grandfather)
- Children: Priyavrat Singh
- Parent: Thakur Devi Singh Akhawat
- Education: Mayo College
- Occupation: Politician; Historian; Poet; Editor; Translator

Kesri Singh Mundiyar (born 1 June 1927), also known as Kesri Singh Roopawas, was an Indian author and politician. He was associated with Swatantra Party and later Bharatiya Janata Party. He represented Pali in Rajasthan Vidhan Sabha from 1962 to 1967. He was a reputed scholar of Dingal, Rajasthani, and English and known for his poetry and translation work.

== Personal life ==
Kesri Singh was born on 1 June 1927, to Thakur Devi Singh Akhawat, thakur of Mundiyar and Roopawas. His maternal grandfather was Ramnathji Ratnu, a noted historian and administrator who had served as the Dewan (Prime Minister) of Idar and Kishangarh States. His has two sons named Thakur Priyavrat Singh and Siddharth singh

=== Education ===
Singh completed his education at Mayo College, Ajmer. He graduated in 1946.

=== Hobby ===
Singh was an avid mountaineer and hunter, he enjoyed hiking in the Himalayas and observing wildlife. Later, he resided in the village of Roopawas, he spent time reading books on history, philosophy, travel, and Rajasthani literature and translating Dingal works, the literary language of Rajasthan.

== Politics ==
Kesri Singh became actively involved in politics and later joined Swatantra Party, which attracted princes and jagirdars ideologically opposed to Congress. He was elected as the head (Pradhan) of the Panchayat Samiti Pali for two terms. He fought 1962 assembly elections from Pali constituency and became a member of the Third Legislative Assembly of Rajasthan from 1962 to 1967.

Kesri Singh Mundiyar
- Writing career
- Notable works: The Hero of Haldighati (1976); An Anthology of Rajasthani Poetry (1999)

=== Swatantra Party ===
Kesri Singh was the first General Secretary of the Swatantra Party. He was a member its First Parliamentary Board till at which he continued till 1964. He was also among the Executive Members and State Working Committee of the party occupying key positions.

=== Bhartiya Janata Party ===
After the decline of Swatantra Party, Kesri Singh joined Bhartiya Janata Party and served as the Vice President of its Rajasthan state unit.

== Authorship ==
Kesri Singh authored several works including English translations of Dingal verses. He was acknowledged as an authority on medieval Rajasthani poetry.

=== An Anthology of Rajasthani Poetry ===
In this work, Kesri Singh has given English translations of historic Dingal poems and verses. This anthology has selections from Dingal poets ranging from medieval to the present times.

=== The Hero of Haldighati ===
Kesri Singh's The Hero of Haldighati provides a detailed critical reconstruction and critique of the battle of Haldighati, including translations of Dingal poetry about Rana Pratap. It a scholarly work that brings forth details on the locale, the protagonists and events of the battle. It includes his essay titled 'The Story of the Battle Of Haldighati' which he authored on the 400th anniversary of the Battle of HaIdi Ghati in 1976. His description of the battle is based on a combination of eye-witness accounts and the works of renowned historians, and is shaped by his own intellectual inferences.

=== Published works ===
1. Singh, Kesri (1999). An Anthology of Rājasthāni Poetry in English Translation. Sahitya Akademi.
2. Singh, Kesri (2002). Maharana Pratap: The Hero of Haldighati. Books Treasure.
3. Khetāsara, Mahendrasiṃha Taṃvara; Rūpāvāsa, Kesarīsiṃha (2014). Mahārāṇā Pratāpa ke Pramukha Sahayogī Rājā Rāmaśāha Taṃvara Gvāliyara (in Hindi). Mahārājā Mānasiṃha Pustaka Prakāśa Śodha Kendra. ISBN 978-93-84168-08-7
4. Roopawas, Kesri Singh. Mahākavi Tamasa Gre Kṛta Ailijī. Rajasthani Granthagar.
5. Brahmanand; Rupawas, Kesri Singh (1999). "The Inscrutable Ways of the Merciful One". Indian Literature. 43 (2 (190)): 124–124. ISSN 0019-5804
6. Rathor, Prithviraj; Rupawas, Kesri Singh (1999). "In Praise of Ganga". Indian Literature. 43 (2 (190)): 121–121. ISSN 0019-5804
7. Rupawas, Kesri Singh (1999). "A Popular Lok Bhajan: Maya Ro Rang Badali". Indian Literature. 43 (2 (190)): 123–123. ISSN 0019-5804
8. Adha, Opa; Rupawas, Kesri Singh (1999). ""All Things to All Men Thou Art, O Lord"". Indian Literature. 43 (2 (190)): 118–120. ISSN 0019-5804
9. Rūpāvāsa, Kesarīsiṃha (1987). "Do ḍiṃgala gīta" (PDF). Jagti Jot. 17 (6): 22 – via Art and Culture, Government of Rajasthan.
