= P. P. Chaudhary =

Politician and senior advocate

PP Chaudhary
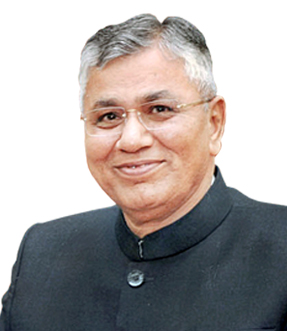

Chairperson of JPC on One Nation, One Election
- Incumbent
- Assumed office 20 December 2024
- Prime Minister: Narendra Modi

Minister of State for Corporate Affairs
- In office 3 September 2017 – 30 May 2019
- Prime Minister: Narendra Modi
- Minister: Arun Jaitley

Minister of State for Law & Justice
- In office 5 July 2016 – 30 May 2019
- Prime Minister: Narendra Modi
- Minister: Ravi Shankar Prasad

Minister of State for Electronics & Information Technology
- In office 5 July 2016 – 3 September 2017
- Prime Minister: Narendra Modi
- Minister: Ravi Shankar Prasad

Member of Parliament, Lok Sabha
- Incumbent
- Assumed office 16 May 2014
- Preceded by: Badri Ram Jakhar
- Constituency: Pali

Personal details
- Born: 12 July 1953 (age 73) Jodhpur, Rajasthan, India
- Party: Bharatiya Janata Party
- Spouse: Veenapani Chaudhary (m. 1983)
- Children: 2
- Education: Jai Narain Vyas University
- Profession: Senior advocate; politician
- Website: ppchaudhary.com

Prem Prakash Chaudhary known as P. P. Chaudhary (born 12 July 1953) is an Indian senior advocate and politician who has served as a Member of Parliament in the Lok Sabha, representing Pali constituency in Rajasthan since 2014. Previously, he had served as a Minister of State for Corporate Affairs, Law and Justice, and Electronics and Information Technology. He is a member of the Bharatiya Janata Party (BJP).

He is currently serving as the Chairperson of the Joint Committee on One Nation, One Election. He has previously served as Chairperson of the Committee on External Affairs, Chairperson of The Joint Committee on the Jan Vishwas (Amendment of Provisions) Bill 2022, Chairperson of The Joint Committee on the Personal Data Protection Bill, 2019 & Joint Committee on Offices of Profit. He is currently also a member of the Estimates Committee, Business Advisory Committee, Finance Committee, Law & Justice Committee, Select Committee on Income Tax Bill 2025, and Consultative Committee of Ministry of Home Affairs, Govt. of India.

== Early life and education ==
Chaudhary was born on 12 July 1953 as the son of Prabhu Ram Chaudhary and Dhaku Devi in Bhavi village of Jodhpur, Rajasthan, India to a farming family. He joined Rashtriya Swayamsevak Sangh Shakha and his early education was done in the life of Pracharaks of RSS. He obtained two bachelor's degrees, B.Sc. and L.L.B. from Jai Narain Vyas University, Jodhpur. He started practicing law from 1978 in the Jodhpur High Court. He is married to Veena Pani Chaudhary and has two children.

== Political journey ==
He won his first Indian general elections in 2014 from Pali Lok Sabha constituency with a victory margin of over 4 lakh votes and in 2019 with a margin of 5 lakh votes and again in 2024 with a margin of 2.5 lakh. He was felicitated with the 'Sansad Ratna Award' for two consecutive years in 2015 & 2016 for outstanding performance in Lok Sabha.

=== Ministerial roles ===
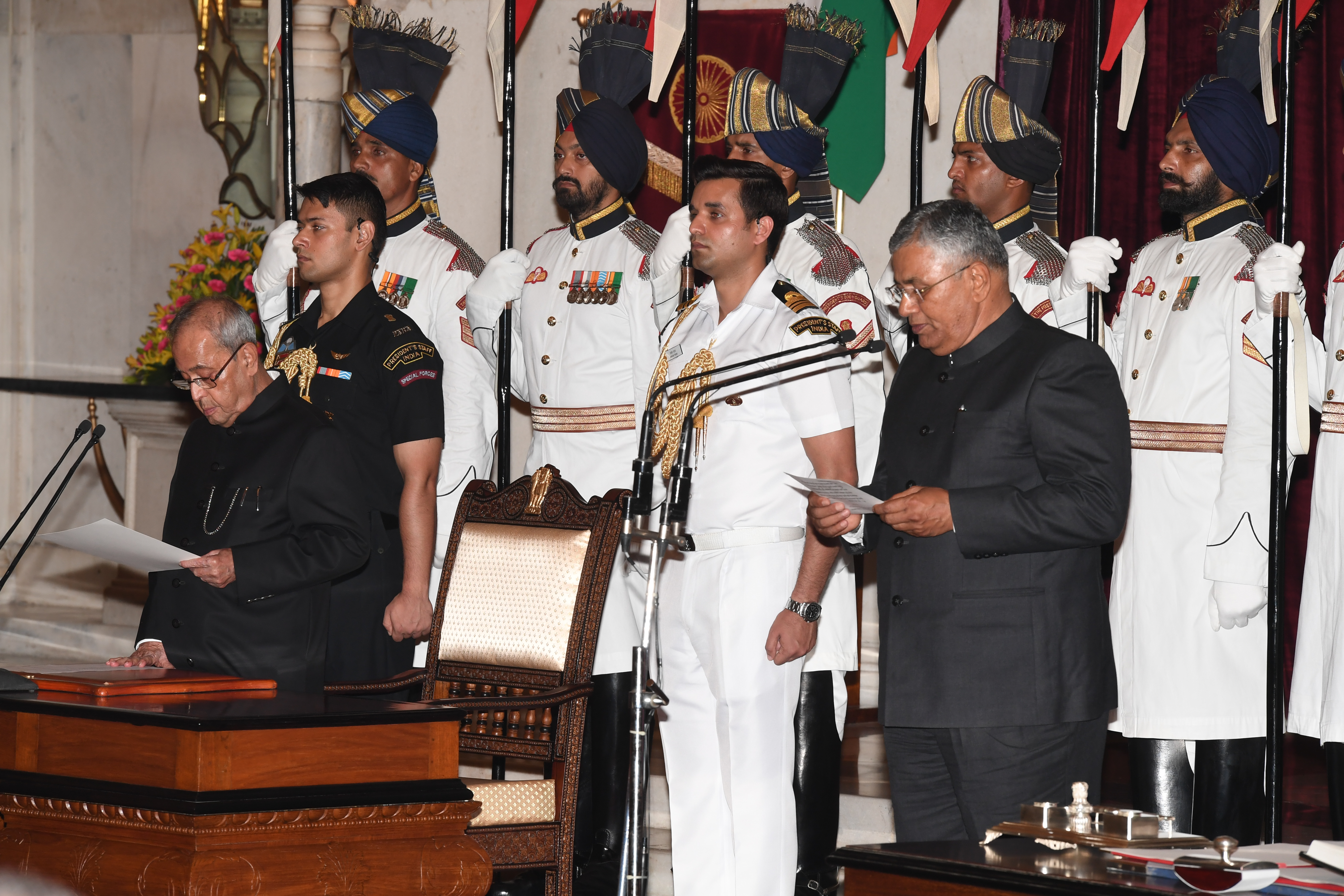
Oath taking ceremony

Chaudhary was sworn in as Minister of state in the Union Council of Ministers on 5 July 2016 and assumed charge at the Ministry of Electronics and Information Technology. As part of his charge, he has worked on bridging the digital divide between urban and rural areas, promoting connection of as many as 1 lakh gram panchayats by the optical fibre network and bringing Wi-fi hotspots to all villages.

Chaudhary also held the post of Minister of State for Ministry of Law and Justice from 5 July 2016 to 30 May 2019, working with Union Law Minister Ravi Shankar Prasad. As Minister of State, Chaudhary represented the Government of India at the Marrakech Law Ministers International Conference on Justice in Marrakech, Morocco, under the theme “the independence of the judiciary” from 01 - 5 April 2018. He also led a delegation to the SCO Justice Ministers’ Meeting in Tashkent in October 2017 as MoS.

Chaudhary was designated the post of Minister of State for Ministry of Corporate Affairs on 3 September 2017. As minister of state he undertook a massive drive to strike off names of 2.5 lakh non-compliant shell companies.

=== Chairman of the Joint Parliamentary Committee on One Nation, One Election ===
In December 2024, P. P. Chaudhary was appointed Chairman of the Joint Parliamentary Committee examining the One Nation, One Election (ONOE) proposal. He has led consultations with political parties, Chief Ministers, state governments, constitutional experts and other stakeholders across the country to build consensus on the feasibility and implementation of simultaneous elections. Chaudhary has also worked towards developing a necessary legal and constitutional framework for implementing ONOE by the 2029 Lok Sabha election, including exploring the possibility of synchronising the Lok Sabha and Assembly elections across 22 states and Union Territories in the first phase.

== Legal career ==
Chaudhary has been practicing law since 1978 in High Courts and the Supreme Court of India. He has been designated as senior advocate at the Jodhpur HC and at the Supreme Court of India. He has a profile of around 11000 (Eleven Thousand) cases, mostly Constitutional Litigation including matters relating to - Constitutional Law, Land Acquisition, Farmers Grievances, Labour & Service, Central Excise & Customs, PIL - related to restoration of natural water bodies & dams, Mines and Minerals, Covenants, Arbitrations, Indian Bankruptcy code and Companies Law.
