= Kissa Kursi Ka =

1977 film by Amrit Nahata

- Film poster
- Directed by: Amrit Nahata
- Produced by: Bhagwant Deshpande; Vijay Kashmiri; Baba Majgavkar
- Starring: Shabana Azmi; Raj Kiran; Utpal Dutt; Rehana Sultan; Manohar Singh
- Music by: Jaidev
- Release date: 1977
- Running time: 142 minutes
- Country: India
- Language: Hindi

Kissa Kursi Ka (transl. Tale of a Throne) is a 1977 Indian Hindi-language political satire film directed by Amrit Nahata, who was a member of Indian parliament and produced by Badri Prasad Joshi. The film was a satire on the politics of Indira Gandhi and her son Sanjay Gandhi and was banned by the Indian Government during the Emergency period and all prints were confiscated. Music of the film was composed by Jaidev Verma.

I&B Minister VC Shukla (censor board was under his ministry) instructed office bearers to be absent from censor board, but two clerks of the office refused to hand over the master prints submitted to the censor board and were punished by transfers. One of the clerks was Sh. Kanwar Chand.

== Plot ==
The plot revolved around a corrupt and evil politician Gangaram or Gangu, played by Manohar Singh, trying to woo personified public, depicted as mute and helpless looking (Shabana Azmi.) The movie is a humorous comment over the system and the selfishness of the politicians regarded as a motion picture version of the cartoonist columns that are the most brutal taunt over the politics.

== Cast ==
- Shabana Azmi as Janta
- Utpal Dutt
- Rehana Sultan
- Raj Babbar as Raj
- Manohar Singh as President Gangaram 'Gangu'
- Surekha Sikri as Meera
- Raj Kiran as Gopal
- Chaman Bagga as Deshpal, President's Secretary
- Katy Mirza as Ruby Dixsana
- Swapna Sundari as an item number

== Ban and print confiscation ==
The film was submitted to the Censor Board for certification on in April 1975. The film had spoofed Sanjay Gandhi auto-manufacturing plans (later established as Maruti Udyog in 1981), besides Congress supporters like Swami Dhirendra Brahmachari, private secretary to Indira Gandhi R.K. Dhawan, and Rukhsana Sultana. The board sent to seven-member revising committee, which further sent it to Union government. Subsequently, a show-cause notice raising 51 objections was sent to the producer by the Information and Broadcasting ministry. In his reply submitted on 11 July 1975, Nahata stated that the characters were "imaginary and do not refer to any political party or persons". By the time, the Emergency has already been declared.

Subsequently, all the prints and the master-print of the film at Censor Board office were picked up, later brought to Maruti factory in Gurgaon, where they were burned. The subsequent Shah Commission established by Government of India in 1977 to inquiry into excesses committed in the Indian Emergency found Sanjay Gandhi guilty of burning the negative, along with V. C. Shukla, Information and Broadcasting minister of the time. The film was reshot again and the new version was subsequently broadcast in 1978.

== Legal case ==
The legal case ran for 11 months, and court gave its judgment on 27 February 1979. Both Sanjay Gandhi and Shukla were sentenced to a month and two-year jail term imprisonment. Sanjay Gandhi was denied bail. The verdict was later overturned. In his judgment, District Judge, O. N. Vohra at Tis Hazari Court in Delhi, found the accused, guilty of "criminal conspiracy, breach of trust, mischief by fire, dishonestly receiving criminal property, concealing stolen property and disappearance of evidence".

== Bibliography ==
- Amrit Nahata (1977). Kissā kursī kā. Rājapāla.
- Jagat S. Bright (1979). "14. Kissa Kuris Ka". Allahabad High Court to Shah Commission. Deep & Deep Publications. p. 43.
