= Roopawas =

Village in Pali district, Rajasthan state, India

Coordinates: 25°45′24.31″N 73°10′29.24″E

Roopawas is a village in Pali district, Rajasthan state, India.

== Notable people ==
- Kesri Singh Mundiyar
