= Gyanchand Parakh =

Indian politician

Member of the Rajasthan Legislative Assembly
- In office 1998–2023
- Succeeded by: Bheem Raj Bhati
- Constituency: Pali

Personal details
- Party: Bharatiya Janata Party
- Occupation: Politician

Gyanchand Parakh is an Indian politician from the Bharatiya Janata Party and is a five term member of the Rajasthan Legislative Assembly representing the Pali Vidhan Sabha constituency of Rajasthan.
