= Pusp Jain =

Indian politician

MP
- Preceded by: Mitha Lal Jain
- Succeeded by: Badri Ram Jakhar
- Constituency: Pali

Personal details
- Born: 4 April 1956 (age 70) Pali, Rajasthan
- Party: BJP
- Spouse: Manju Jain
- Children: 2 sons
- As of 14 September, 2006

Pusp Jain (born 4 April 1956) was a member of the 13th Lok Sabha and 14th Lok Sabha of India. He represented the Pali constituency of Rajasthan and is a member of the Bharatiya Janata Party (BJP) political party.
