= Gair dance =

Folk dance of Rajsthan

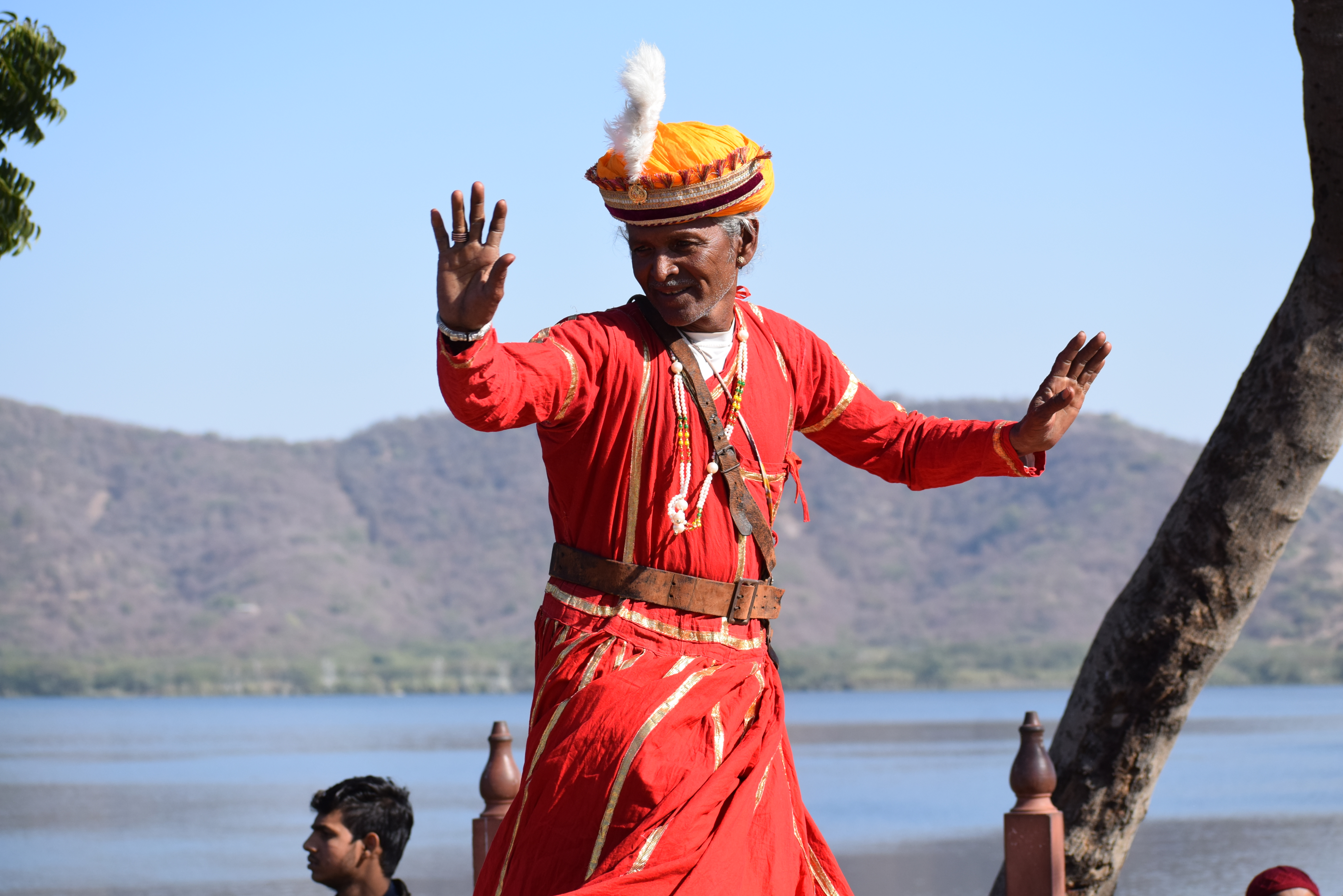
- Genre: Folk dance
- Instrument(s): Dholak, nagada, dhol
- Origin: Rajasthan, India

Gair dance is one of the popular, famous folk dances from Rajasthan in India which is mostly performed by the Bhil community but found in all over Rajasthan.

It is alternatively referred to as Gair Ghalna, Gair Ghumna, Gair Khelna, and Gair Nachna. This dance is famous and performed mostly by all the communities but it is more famous in Mewar and Marwar regions of Rajasthan. Gair is not similar of all the places. Every place has its own rhythm, style of forming circle, costume etc. It is performed during occasions like in month of Holi and Janmastami. Colourful costumes, traditional instruments and captivating dance steps are the highlights of this dance. To enjoy this folk art form various viewers from different corners of the world flock to the state every year. Gair dance is performed by both men and women. Gair has got its birth from a Bhil dance.

== Performance ==
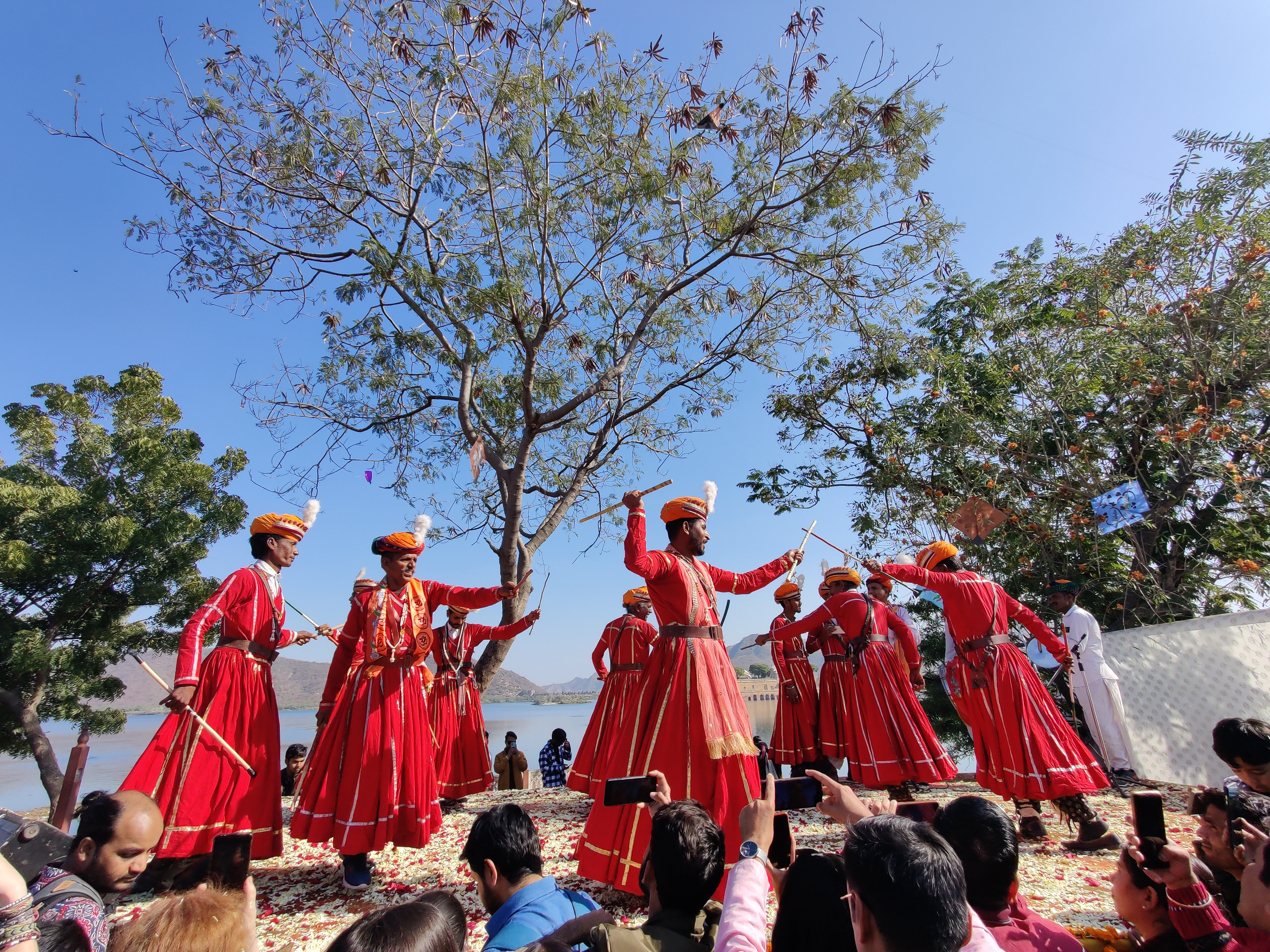
Gair Dance

Usually, the dancers dance in a big circle with wooden stick in their hands. There are numerous variations to this pleasing dance form that is performed by both men and women. The men wear long, pleated tunics that open out into full-length skirts Both men and women dance together, dressed in traditional costume. At the commencement of the dance, participants form two circles, the women, who form a small inner circle, are encompassed by men, who form a large circle around them, and They move first in clockwise then in anti-clockwise direction determining the rhythm of the dance by the beating together of sticks and striking of drums. As the dance proceeds, the participants change places, with men forming the inner circle. Sometimes, it is performed exclusively by men folk. At that time, a series of half-swirls make up a simpler version of the dance depending on the dancer`s ability & proficiency, it is danced with a series of intricate pattern steps. The striking of sticks gives the dance a vigorous character & consistent tempo. Gair dances by Bhil folk are performed with wearing colourful dresses and carrying swords, arrows and sticks. It is the major attraction of people. There are many differences in the performance of men and women in this dance. The sticks used in the dance are called Khanda. It is danced with a series of intricate pattern steps.The striking of the sticks gives the dance a vigorous character and a consistent tempo. When they are dancing it seems as if they are depicting a scene from war front. It is believed by the locals that this dance must have got some significance to war. This form of dance is also seen in Africa and Central Asia. These sticks are very attractive and catch every eye. The sticks play vital role in the dance. They are very thin and does not carry much of weight and give a flare look. These sticks are cut from the Gundi tree and involves little cleaning process. In some places instead of sticks swords are used.In one hand the dancers carries the naked sword and in the other hand is occupied with Khanda(a name of sword in Rajasthan) or the stick.Apart from this Gair is also of third type in which the dancers carry sword in one hand and in the other hand they carry the wooden sword.

== Instruments ==
The musical instruments that accompany this folk dance consist of Dhol, Nagada, Dholak and flute. The melodious song and enchanting background music encourages everyone to dance with the beat.

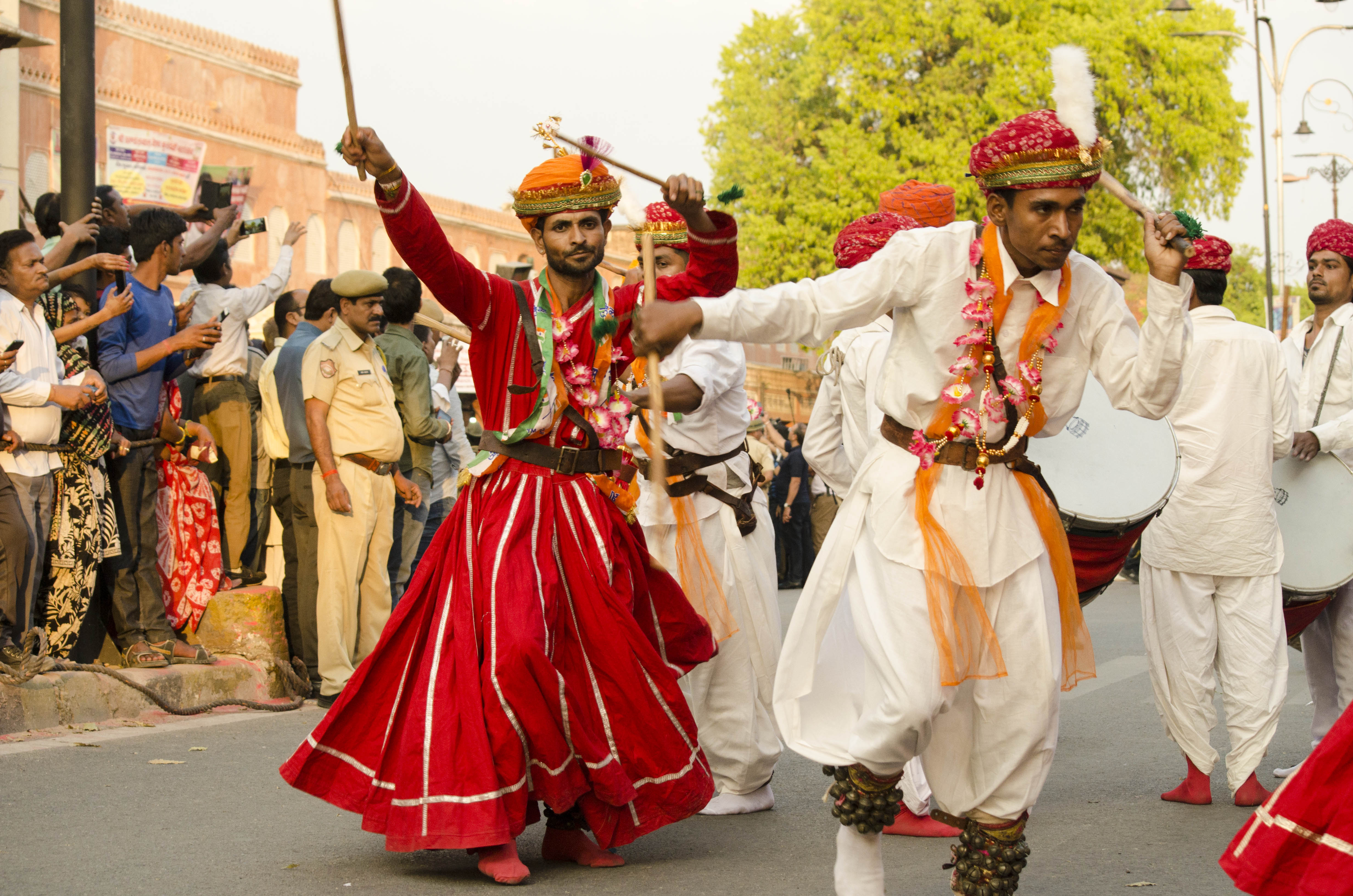
Gair dance

== Occasions of dance ==
Though Gair dance can performed at any time in the form of entertainment but it is performed at the time any festive occasions. It is mainly performed on the festive occasion of Festive month occasions like Holi(feb-march) and Janmastami., Janmastami seems incomplete without the show of Gair dance.

== Variations of Gair Dance ==
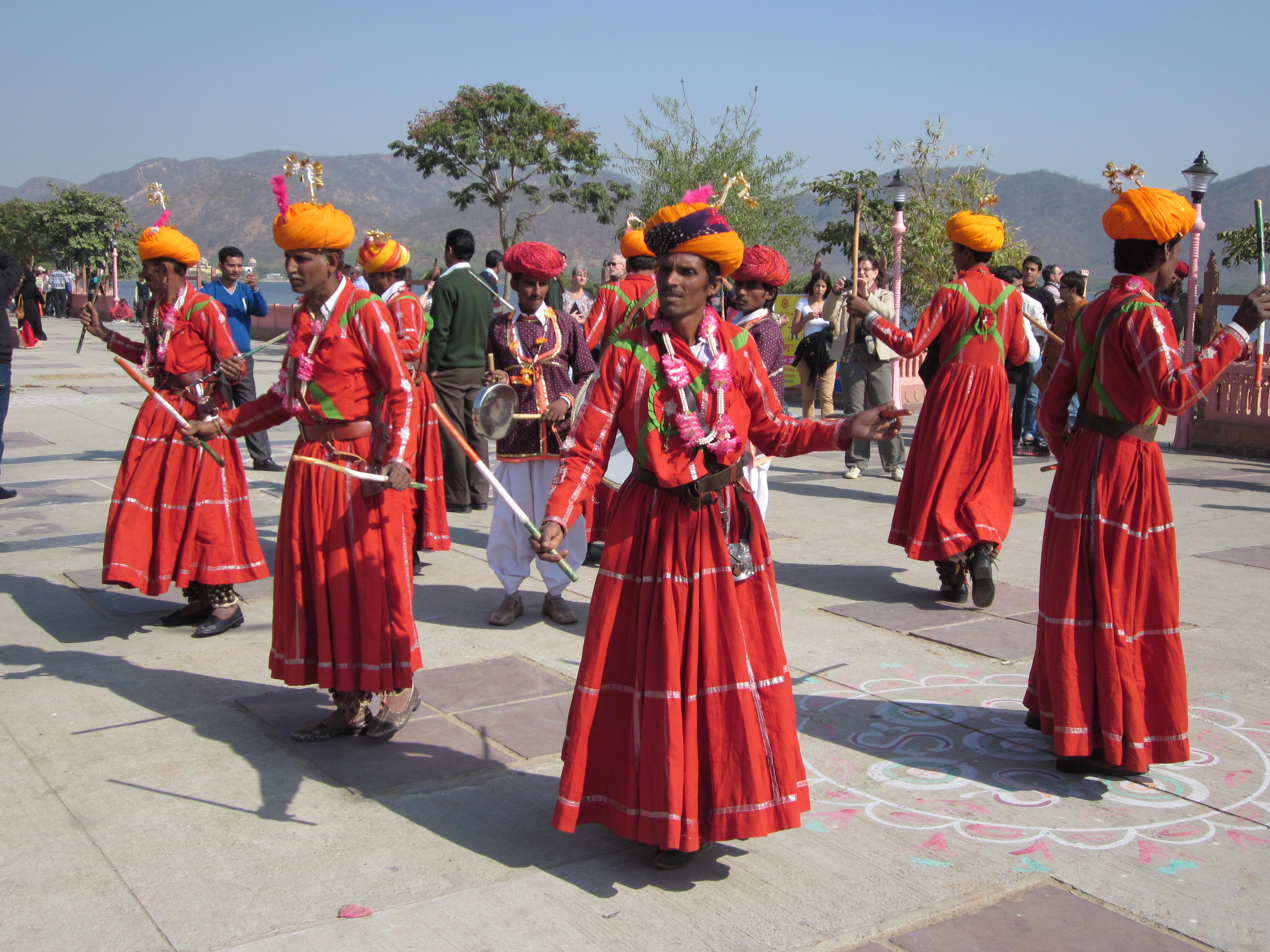
An important festival of the region with special celebration .the Tribal, colorful attired carrying sticks, performing the Gair dance.

It is also known as Gair Ghalna, Gair Gamna, Gair khelna and Gair Nachna. Some of the variations of Gair dance are the Dandi Gair found in the Marwar region and Geendad found in the Shekhawati region of Rajasthan.

== Costumes ==
Generally, the men wear long, pleated tunic that open out into full length skirts but variations are in costumes according to local areas. The Bhil folk perform this dance by wearing colourful dresses and carrying swords, arrows and sticks.
