= Sheoganj =

- Town
- Location in Rajasthan, India Sheoganj (India)
- Coordinates: 25.15°N 73.07°E
- Country: India
- State: Rajasthan
- District: Sirohi
- Elevation: 260 m (850 ft)

Population (2001)
  - Total: 24,785

Languages
  - Official: Hindi
- Time zone: UTC+5:30 (IST)
- Vehicle registration: RJ 24 (Sirohi)

Sheoganj is a town in Sirohi District of Rajasthan state in India located on the bank of Jawai River. Sheoganj is the tehsil headquarters of Sheoganj Tehsil by the same name.

Nearby is the Erinpura Chhavani, which was the military base station of the British soldiers. The nearest railway station is Jawai Bandh. Jawai River separates Sumerpur and Sheoganj. Falna is within one hour, while Ranakpur is within two-hour drive from here. Even Bamnera which is just 12 km. from Sheoganj is also very close for visiting ancient temples. The district is known for its large pomegranate, papaya, lemon, guava and grapefruit plantations.

== Geography ==
Sheoganj is located at 25.15°N 73.07°E. It has an average elevation of 260 metres (853 feet).

== Demographics ==
As of 2001 Indian census, Sheoganj had a population of 24,780. Males constitute 83% of the population and females 17%. Sheoganj has an average literacy rate of 67%, higher than the national average of 59.5%: male literacy is 77%, and female literacy is 56%. In Sheoganj, 16% of the population is under 6 years of age.
