= Kesaram Choudhary =

Indian politician

- केसाराम चौधरी(काकू)

Member of the 16th Rajasthan Legislative Assembly
- Preceded by: Khushveer Singh
- Constituency: Marwar

Personal details
- Party: Bhartiya Janta Party
- Occupation: Politician

Kesaram Choudhary (Kaku) is an Indian politician currently serving as a member of the 16th Rajasthan Legislative Assembly, representing the Marwar Junction Assembly constituency as a member of the Bhartiya Janta Party .

Following the 2023 Rajasthan Legislative Assembly election, he was elected as an MLA from the Marwar Junction Assembly constituency, defeating Khushveer Singh, the candidate from the Indian National Congress (INC), by a margin of 33,021 votes.
