= Amrit Nahata =

Indian politician and film maker

- Born: 16 May 1928; Jodhpur
- Died: 26 April 2001 (aged 72)
- Occupations: Politician, film maker

Amrit Nahata (16 May 1928 – 26 April 2001) was an Indian politician, three-time member of Lok Sabha and film maker. He was elected to Lok Sabha twice from Barmer, as a member of the Indian National Congress, the second largest parliamentary constituency in India over twice the size of Belgium. However, he left Congress after the Emergency, and went on to direct the controversial film Kissa Kursi Ka in 1977. He later served a third term in Lok Sabha as a member of the Janata Party, representing Pali constituency.

== Early life and education ==
Nahata was born in Jodhpur, Rajasthan on 16 May 1928. He earned a B.A. from Jaswant College, Jodhpur.

== Career ==
=== Literary career ===
Nahata started his career as an educator and translator; throughout his career he published twelve books translated from English into Hindi, including works of Maxim Gorky, Joseph Stalin, Vladimir Lenin, Mao Zedong and Liu Shaoqi.

=== Political career ===
Later in life, Nahata joined politics and the Indian National Congress, he was elected to the 4th Lok Sabha (1967—70) and the 5th Lok Sabha (1971— 77) from Barmer constituency. He left Congress after the Emergency, made the controversial film Kissa Kursi Ka in 1977 and joined Janata Party. In the next election, he was elected again to the 6th Lok Sabha from Pali.

=== Film career ===
In his film career, he produced and directed three films, Sant Gyaneshwar a religious biopic in 1965 and a crime thriller Raton Ka Raja in 1967. In 1977, he directed a controversial film Kissa Kursi Ka. The film, a satire of Indira Gandhi and Sanjay Gandhi, was banned during the Emergency period, all the prints and the master-print of the film at the Censor Board office were picked up, later brought to Maruti factory in Gurgaon, where they were burned. The subsequent Shah Commission established to inquiry into excesses committed in the Indian Emergency found Sanjay Gandhi guilt of burning the negative, along with V. C. Shukla, Information and Broadcasting minister of the time, they both spent a month and two-year jail term. Nahata never made another film.

He died on 26 April 2001 during an operation at Escorts Hospital in Delhi, at age 74. He was survived by his wife, two sons and a daughter.

== Filmography ==
- Sant Gyaneshwar (1965)
- Raton Ka Raja (1967)
- Kissa Kursi Ka (1977)
