= Shobha Chauhan =

Indian politician

Shobha Chauhan is an Indian politician. She is a member of the Rajasthan Legislative Assembly from the Bhartiya Janata Party representing the Sojat Assembly, District Pali, Rajasthan since 2018. Also Chauhan is holding the post of State Vice-President, S.C. Morcha Bhartiya Janata Party, Rajasthan State. She defeated Shobha Solanki in the 2018 Assembly elections, who belonged to the Indian National Congress.

Chauhan entered politics at the Panchayati Raj level as she was elected as Pradhan, Panchayat Samiti Raipur-Marwar, District Pali (Raj.) in February 2015 from the Bhartiya Janata Party. Earlier she also held posts as National Cooperator, Panchayati Raj & Gramin Vikas Samiti, Rashtriya Bhartiya Janata Party Kisaan Morcha, New Delhi also she was the Member, Mahatma Gandhi Rural Employment Guarantee Scheme, Jaipur.

Her husband, Rajesh Kumar Chauhan is a senior Rajasthan Administrative Service officer and currently serving as DIRECTOR, RAJASTHAN STATE AGRICULTURE MARKETING & EX-OFFICIO JOINT SECRETARY TO GOVERNMENT AND ADMINISTRATOR, AGRICULTURE MARKETING BOARD, JAIPUR. During her campaign for the Legislative Assembly, she was reported as saying "We have 'satta' [power] and 'Sangathan' [state government] at our disposal. We won't let the police intervene in child marriages".
