= Standing Committee on External Affairs =

Committee of Indian Parliament for legislative oversight

Committee on External Affairs
Department Related Standing Committee
- 18th Lok Sabha
- Country: India

Leadership
- Chairperson: Shashi Tharoor
- Chairperson party: Indian National Congress
- Appointer: Lok sabha Speaker

Structure
- Seats: 31; Lok Sabha : 21; Rajya Sabha : 10

The Parliamentary Standing Committee on External Affairs is a department related standing committee (DRSC) of selected members of parliament, constituted by the Parliament of India, for the purpose of legislative oversight of the foreign policy, and decision making of the Ministry of External Affairs. It is one of the 24 DRSCs that have been mandated with the task of ministry specific oversight.

The committee is currently chaired by MP Shashi Tharoor since 26 September 2024.

== Current Composition ==
Each of the committees have 31 members – 21 from Lok Sabha and 10 from Rajya Sabha. These members are to be nominated by the Speaker of Lok Sabha or the Chairman of Rajya Sabha respectively. The term of office of these committees does not exceed one year. These committees are serviced either by Lok Sabha secretariat or the Rajya Sabha secretariat, depending on who has appointed the chairman of that committee.

Following are the members of the Parliamentary Standing Committee on External Affairs.

Keys: BJP (14) INC (4) SP (2) AITC (2) CPIM (2) DMK (1) SS(UBT) (1) YSRCP (1) RJD (1) IUML (1) AIMIM (1) = 31 members

Party-wise membership of Standing Committee on Defence
1. BJP (45.2%)
2. INC (12.9%)
3. SP (6.45%)
4. AITC (6.45%)
5. CPIM (6.45%)
6. DMK (3.22%)
7. SS(UBT) (3.22%)
8. YSRCP (3.22%)
9. RJD (3.22%)
10. IUML (3.22%)
11. AIMIM (3.22%)

=== Lok Sabha members ===
21 Members from 18th Lok Sabha; tenure – September 2024 – 2025
Sr. No.	Name	Constituency, state	Party
1	Shashi Tharoor^{(Note: Chairperson of the committee for the current year.)}	Thiruvananthapuram, Kerala	INC
2	Deepender Singh Hooda	Rohtak, Haryana	INC
3	Brijendra Singh Ola	Jhunjhunu, Rajasthan	INC
4	Praniti Shinde	Solapur, Maharashtra	INC
5	D. K. Aruna	Mahabubnagar, Telangana	BJP
6	Vijay Baghel	Durg, Chhattisgarh	BJP
7	Mitesh Rameshbhai Patel	Anand, Gujarat	BJP
8	Arun Govil	Meerut, Uttar Pradesh	BJP
9	Kripanath Mallah	Karimganj, Assam	BJP
10	Pradeep Kumar Panigrahy	Berhampur, Odisha	BJP
11	Ravi Shankar Prasad	Patna Sahib, Bihar	BJP
12	Aparajita Sarangi	Bhubaneswar, Odisha	BJP
13	Bansuri Swaraj	New Delhi, Delhi	BJP
14	Sanatan Pandey	Ballia, Uttar Pradesh	SP
15	Akshay Yadav	Firozabad, Uttar Pradesh	SP
16	Abhishek Banerjee	Diamond Harbour, West Bengal	AITC
17	Arvind Sawant	Mumbai South, Maharashtra	SS(UBT)
18	Y. S. Avinash Reddy	Kadapa, Andhra Pradesh	YSRCP
19	Kani K. Navas	Ramanathapuram, Tamil Nadu	IUML
20	Asaduddin Owaisi	Hyderabad, Telangana	AIMIM
21	Vacant		

=== Rajya Sabha members ===
10 Members from the Rajya Sabha: tenure – September 2024 – 2025
Sr. No.	Name	State Legislature	Party
1	Kiran Choudhry	Haryana	BJP
2	K. Laxman	Uttar Pradesh	BJP
3	Sudhanshu Trivedi	Uttar Pradesh	BJP
4	Kavita Patidar	Madhya Pradesh	BJP
5	Ratanjit Pratap Narain Singh	Uttar Pradesh	BJP
6	John Brittas	Kerala	CPIM
7	A. A. Rahim	Kerala	CPIM
8	Sagarika Ghose	West Bengal	AITC
9	R. Girirajan	Tamil Nadu	DMK
10	Amarendra Dhari Singh	Bihar	RJD

== Chairpersons ==
=== Chairpersons of the committee (1993–present) ===
Sr. No.	Name	Term of office	Years	Political party (Alliance)
1	Buta Singh	1993–95	2	INC
2	No Public records found	1995–98	3	
3	Kamal Chaudhary	1998–99	1	INC
4	Laxminarayan Pandey	1999–2002	3	BJP
5	Madan Lal Khurana	2002–04	2	BJP
6	Balasaheb Vikhe Patil	2004–08	4	INC
7	Satpal Maharaj	2008–11	4	INC
8	Raj Babbar	2012–14	2	INC
9	Maj Gen. BC Khanduri (Retd.)	2014–17	3	BJP
10	Kalraj Mishra	2017–19	2	BJP
11	P. P. Chaudhary	2021–2024	1	BJP
12	Shashi Tharoor	2024–present	1	INC

== Reports published ==
As part of its oversight process, the committee has published quite a number of reports over the course of its existence. The committee has published a total of 87 reports from 1993 to 2010. Out of these, 18 are reports on Demands for Grants (DFGs), 25 reports on subjects taken up by the committee, 5 reports on bills referred to the committee and 36 are reports on action taken by the government on corresponding reports of the committee.

In March 2023, the committee in its Demand for Grants (2023–24) report, criticized the ministry for being "most short-staffed" and under-budgeted. The committee highlighted that The total strength of 4,888 is distributed across different cadres of the Ministry such as the Indian Foreign Service (IFS), IFS General Cadre, IFS Group B, Stenographers Cadre, Interpreters Cadre, Legal and Treaties Cadre, among others. The cadre strength of Indian Foreign Service Officers is only 1,011, just 22.5 percent of the total strength. Out of IFS 'A' cadre, 667 are posted at the Missions abroad and 334 are manning the headquarters in Delhi, which currently has 57 divisions. The committee also highlighted that the ministry “remains one amongst the least funded central ministries” as its actual annual spending has been around 0.4% of the total budgetary allocation of the government since 2020-21.

Lok Sabha	Tenure	Demands for Grants(DFGs)	Subjects	Bills	ATRs	Total Reports Presented
10th Lok Sabha	1991–96	3	2	–	3	8
11th Lok Sabha	1996–97	2	–	2	2	6
12th Lok Sabha	1998–99	2	4	–	2	8
13th Lok Sabha	1999–04	4	4	1	12	21
14th Lok Sabha	2004–09	5	14	2	15	36
15th Lok Sabha	2009–14	2	1	–	2	5
16th Lok Sabha	2014–2019					
17th Lok Sabha	2019–2024					

== See also ==
- 17th Lok Sabha
- Estimates Committee
- Committee on Public Undertakings
- Public Accounts Committee (India)
- Standing Committee on Finance
