= Committee on Finance =

Committee on Finance or Finance Committee may refer to:

- Board of Finance in New England local government (with varying titles outside Connecticut)
- Canadian Senate Standing Committee on National Finance, a standing committee of the Senate of Canada
- Canadian House of Commons Standing Committee on Finance
- Finance Committee (French National Assembly)
- Standing Committee on Finance (Parliament of India)
- Finance Committee (House of Commons), a committee of the House of Commons of the United Kingdom
- Finance Committee (House of Lords), a committee of the House of Lords of the United Kingdom
- Finance Committee (Sweden), a committee of the Riksdag
- Finance Committee (works council), a committee of German works council
- United States Senate Committee on Finance, a standing committee of the United States Senate
- Finance Committee (Israel)

== See also ==
- Economic Affairs Committee (disambiguation)
- Public Accounts Committee
  - Public Accounts Committee (India)
- Estimates Committee (India)
- Board of Finance (disambiguation)
- Ministry of finance
