= Standing Committee on Home Affairs =

Committee of Indian Parliament for legislative oversight

Department Related Standing Committee
- 18th Lok Sabha
- Country: India

Leadership
- Chaiperson: Radha Mohan Das Agarwal
- Chairperson party: Bharatiya Janata Party
- Appointer: Lok sabha Speaker

Structure
- Seats: 31; Lok Sabha : 21; Rajya Sabha : 10

The Parliamentary Standing Committee on Home Affairs (SCOHA) is a department related standing committee (DRSC) of selected members of parliament, constituted by the Parliament of India, for the purpose of legislative oversight of the domestic policy, internal security and decision making of the Ministry of Home Affairs. It is one of the 24 DRSCs that have been mandated with the onerous task of ministry specific oversight.

The committee currently is headed by MP Radha Mohan Das Agarwal.

== Current composition ==
Each of the committees have 31 members – 21 from Lok Sabha and 10 from Rajya Sabha. These members are to be nominated by the Speaker of Lok Sabha or the Chairman of Rajya Sabha respectively. The term of office of these committees does not exceed one year. These committees are serviced either by Lok Sabha secretariat or the Rajya Sabha secretariat, depending on who has appointed the chairman of that committee.

Following are the members of the Parliamentary Standing Committee on Home Affairs Keys: BJP (11) INC (5) AIADMK (2) AITC (3) TDP (2) BJD (2) SS (2) TRS (1) JDS (1) SAD (1) JDU (1) = 31 members

Party-wise membership of Standing Committee on Defence
1. BJP 40 (38.7%)
2. INC 13.33 (12.9%)
3. AITC 10 (9.68%)
4. AIADMK 6.67 (6.46%)
5. TDPTRS 6.67 (6.46%)
6. BJD 6.67 (6.46%)
7. SS 6.67 (6.46%)
8. TRS 3.33 (3.22%)
9. JDS 3.33 (3.22%)
10. SAD 3.33 (3.22%)
11. JDU 3.33 (3.22%)

21 Members from 18th Lok Sabha; tenure – September 2024-25
Sr. No.	Portrait	Name	Constituency, state	Party
1		Ashish Dubey	Jabalpur, Madhya Pradesh	BJP
2		Satish Kumar Gautam	Aligarh, Uttar Pradesh	BJP
3		Naveen Jindal	Kurukshetra, Haryana	BJP
4		Jyotirmay Singh Mahato	Purulia, West Bengal	BJP
5		Kalaben Delkar	Dadra and Nagar Haveli	BJP
6		B. Y. Raghavendra	Shimoga, Karnataka	BJP
7		Vishnu Dayal Ram	Palamu, Jharkhand	BJP
8		Jai Parkash	Hisar, Haryana	INC
9		Sukhjinder Singh Randhawa	Gurdaspur, Punjab	INC
10		Muhammed Hamdulla Sayeed	Lakshadweep	INC
11		Amrinder Singh Raja Warring	Ludhiana, Punjab	INC
12		Kakoli Ghosh Dastidar	Barasat, West Bengal	AITC
13		Mala Roy	Kolkata Dakshin, West Bengal	AITC
14		Kesineni Chinni	Vijayawada, Andhra Pradesh	TDP
15		Krishna Prasad Tenneti	Bapatla, Andhra Pradesh	TDP
16		Dayanidhi Maran	Chennai Central, Tamil Nadu	DMK
17		Anil Desai	Mumbai South Central, Maharashtra	SS(UBT)
18		Dhairyasheel Sambhajirao Mane	Hatkanangle, Maharashtra	SS
19		Supriya Sule	Baramati, Maharashtra	NCP(SP)
20		Chandrashekhar Azad	Nagina, Uttar Pradesh	ASP(KR)
21	Vacant			
Notes

10 Members from the Rajya Sabha
Sr. No.	Name	State Legislature	Party
1	Radha Mohan Das Agarwal^{(Note: Chairperson of the committee for the current year.)}	Uttar Pradesh	BJP
2	Nabam Rebia	Arunachal Pradesh	BJP
3	Neeraj Shekhar	Uttar Pradesh	BJP
4	Samik Bhattacharya	West Bengal	BJP
5	Ajay Maken	Karnataka	INC
6	Derek O'Brien	West Bengal	AITC
7	Sanjay Yadav	Bihar	RJD
8	Haris Beeran	Kerala	IUML
9	G. K. Vasan	Tamil Nadu	TMC
10	Kapil Sibal	Uttar Pradesh	IND

== Comments and reports ==
=== Tek Fog ===
In January 2022, MP Derek O'Brien (Trinamool Congress) and a member of the Parliamentary Standing Committee on Home Affairs wrote to Anand Sharma, head of the committee to discuss the secret app "Tek Fog" that "has serious ramifications and could jeopardise national security". He wrote, "This application is capable of penetrating encrypted messaging platforms and secure social media conversations, in order to heavily manipulate and exploit narratives on said platforms."

On 12 January, Congress leader and leader of the party in the Lok Sabha Adhir Ranjan Chowdhury also wrote to the chairman of the Parliamentary Standing Committee on Home Affairs, Anand Sharma, asking the committee discuss the "Violative Software Application 'Tek Fog'", in their next meeting.

The Parliamentary standing committee asked the Union Home Ministry to provide information about the 'Tek Fog' app that was allegedly used for manipulating social media trends. On 12 February, responding to the request, MoS for Electronics and Information Technology Rajeev Chandrasekhar said, "The ministry has searched for the app on all prominent app stores and APK stores and could not find so called app in any of these online stores."

=== Police reforms ===
In 2022, the committee submitted to Rajya Sabha, its report titled "Police — Training, Modernisation and Reforms", the committee expressed concern about the low representation of women in police forces, at only 10.30%.

== Chairpersons ==
Sr. No.	Name	Term of office	Terms	Political party (Alliance)
-	Anand Sharma	2019–Present	3	INC

== See also ==
- 17th Lok Sabha
- Estimates Committee
- Committee on Public Undertakings
- Public Accounts Committee (India)
- Standing Committee on Finance
