= Manabendra Shah =

Indian politician

Maharaja Manabendra Shah Sahib Bahadur

Member of Parliament, Lok Sabha
- In office 1991–2007
- Succeeded by: Vijay Bahuguna
- Constituency: Tehri Garhwal
- In office 1957–1971
- Preceded by: Kamalendumati Shah
- Constituency: Tehri Garhwal

Personal details
- Born: 26 May 1921 Tehri, Princely State of Tehri Garhwal, British India (presently New Tehri, Uttarakhand, India)
- Died: 5 January 2007 (aged 85) New Delhi
- Party: BJP
- Spouse(s): Maharani Suraj Kanwar, Banswara Royal Family
- Children: 1 son, Manujendra Shah; 3 daughters, Anupama Kumari, Nirupama Kumari, Swarupa Kumari
- As of 16 September, 2006

Lt. Col. Maharaja Manabendra Shah Sahib Bahadur (26 May 1921 – 5 January 2007) was a member of the 2nd, 3rd, 4th, 10th, 11th, 12th, 13th and 14th Lok Sabha of India. He represented the Tehri Garhwal constituency of Uttarakhand and was a member of the Indian National Congress before joining the Bharatiya Jan Sangh and later the Bharatiya Janata Party (BJP). He became one of the BJP's longest-serving members. Shah was India's ambassador to Ireland from 1980 to 1983.

Shah was also the last ruling Maharaja of the Garhwal Kingdom (1946–1949), when Tehri Garhwal princely state acceded to independent India on 1 August 1949.

He served as an Honorary Lieutenant Colonel in the Bengal Engineer Group (formerly, the King George V's Own Bengal Sappers and Miners Group, Royal Indian Engineers and prior to that, the 1st Prince of Wales Own Bengal Sappers and Miners).

== Education and personal life ==
He was born to Maharaja Narendra Shah Sahib Bahadur and Maharani Indu Matt Devi.

He studied at Government College, Lahore and ICS Camp, Dehradun (Uttarakhand).

He was also the Patron of the Badrinath and Kedarnath Temples, President of the Temple Board of Management, Tehri Garhwal, Trustee of the Maharaja Narendra Shah Trust and the Maharaja Kirti Shah Trust.

His interests include reading, photography and travelling.

He was a sports enthusiast and member of the following sports clubs: Cricket Club, Gymkhana Club, Golf Club, Army Golf Club, National Sports Club, Royal Western India Turf Club, and Rotary Club.

== Parliamentary contributions ==
During his long parliamentary career, he served on various Committees as follows:

- Chairman of the Committee on Health and Drinking Water for the Hills
- Member of the Committee on Estimates
- Chairman of its Sub-Committee on Estimates
- Member of the Committee on Finance, 1991/93 and 1995/96
- Member of the Consultative Committee
- Ministry of Surface Transport, 1991/96
- Member of the Committee on Public Undertakings
- Committee on External Affairs and Consultative Committee
- Ministry of Power, 1996/97
- Chairman of the Committee on Public Undertakings
- Member of the General Purposes Committee
- Member of the Committee on Transport and Tourism
- Member of the Consultative Committee, Ministry of Defence,1998/99
- Member of the Committee of Home Affairs, 1999/2004.

== Family in politics ==
His daughter-in law Mala Rajya Laxmi Shah was elected to Lok Sabha from the same seat in 2012.

His son-in-law, Mahendra Singh Mewar, had led a yatra with Atal Bihari Vajpayee in Mewar. Mahendra was elected to the Lok Sabha from Chittorgarh in the 1989 Indian general election from BJP with a record winning margin of over 1,90,000 votes. He moved to Indian National Congress and contested from Chittorgarh Constituency and lost to Jaswant Singh of the BJP and then from Bhilwara Constituency where he lost to Subhash Chandra Baheria in 1996 Lok Sabha elections.

His grandson Vishvaraj Singh Mewar is the Bharatiya Janata Party candidate from Nathdwara constituency for the 2023 Rajasthan Legislative Assembly Elections.

== Death ==
He died on 5 January 2007 in New Delhi after a long illness, and was accorded a state funeral at Narendranagar, Tehri-Garhwal on the 7 January 2007.
