= Standing Committee on Defence (India) =

Committee of Indian Parliament for legislative oversight

Department Related Standing Committee
- 18th Lok Sabha
- Founded: April 1993; 33 years ago
- Country: India

Leadership
- Chaiperson: Radha Mohan Singh
- Chairperson party: Bharatiya Janata Party
- Appointer: Lok sabha speaker

Structure
- Seats: 31; Lok Sabha : 21; Rajya Sabha : 10
- Political Parties: BJP (13); INC (5); SP (1); AITC (1); DMK (1); TDP (1); RJD (1); AAP (1); NCP (1); BJD (1); AIADMK (1); CPI (1); VCK (1); ZPM (1); IND (1)
- Election criteria: The members are elected every year from amongst its members of respective houses according to the principle of proportional representation.
- Tenure: 1 Year

Jurisdiction
- Purpose: Legislative oversight of the defence policies and decision making of the Ministry of Defence (MOD)

Rules & Procedure
- Rules of Procedure and Conduct of Business in Lok Sabha 2014
- Applicable rules: Rule 331 C through N (page 122 – 125); Fifth Schedule (page 158)

The Parliamentary Standing Committee on Defence (SCOD) is a department related standing committee (DRSC) of selected members of parliament, constituted by the Parliament of India, for the purpose of legislative oversight of the defence policies and decision making of the Ministry of Defence (MOD). It is one of the 24 DRSCs that have been mandated with the onerous task of ministry specific oversight.

The committee consists of thirty-one members: twenty-one elected from the Lok Sabha, the lower house of the Parliament, and not more than ten members from the Rajya Sabha, the upper house of the Parliament. The term of office of the members is one year and they are elected yearly from their respective houses according to the principle of proportional representation by means of single transferable vote. The chairperson is appointed by the Lok Sabha speaker. A minister is not eligible to become a member of the committee and a member must relinquish their seat if they become a Minister.

The committee currently is headed by MP Kalraj Mishra, succeeding MP Maj Gen BC Khanduri (Retd.).

== History ==
Following the adoption of the Reports of Rules Committees of the 10th Lok Sabha by the two Houses on 29 March 1993, the way was paved for the setting up of the seventeen Departmentally Related Standing Committees(DRSCs) covering under their jurisdiction all the Ministries/Departments of the Union Government. Formally setup in April 1993, the committee used to consist of 45 members— 30 nominated by the Speaker from amongst the members of Lok Sabha and 15 members nominated by the chairman, Rajya Sabha from amongst the members of Rajya Sabha.

However, during the re-structuring of DRSCs in July 2004 by the 14th Lok Sabha, the membership was reduced to 31 members—21 from Lok Sabha and 10 from Rajya Sabha.

The inaugural chairperson of the committee was Buta Singh, former Minister of Home Affairs (1984–86) and Minister of Consumer Affairs, Food and Public Distribution (1995–96) and a member of Indian National Congress.

== Scope and Working ==
=== Functions ===
The functions of the committee are stated as below :

- To consider the Demands for Grants of the Ministry of Defence (MOD) and make reports on the same which are to be tabled in both the houses.
- To examine such bills pertaining to the MOD as are referred to the committee by the Speaker, Lok Sabha or the Chairman, Rajya Sabha.
- To consider annual report of the MOD.
- To consider national basic long-term policy documents presented to the Houses, if referred to the committee by the Speaker, Lok Sabha or the chairman, Rajya Sabha.

The Standing Committees shall not consider the matters of day-to-day administration of the department.

=== Working Procedures ===
==== Procedure relating to consideration of Demands for Grants ====
After the general discussion on the Budget in the House is over, the Lok Sabha is adjourned for a fixed period. The Committee considers the Demands for Grants of the Ministry of Defence under its jurisdiction during the aforesaid period and present/lay reports. The Report on Demands for Grants does not suggest anything of the nature of cut motions. The Demands for Grants are considered by the House in the light of the Reports of the Committee

==== Procedure relating to consideration of Bills ====
The Committee considers only such Bills introduced in either of the Houses as are referred to it by the Speaker, Lok Sabha or the chairman, Rajya Sabha as the case may be. The Committee considers the general principles and clauses of the Bills referred to it and makes Reports thereon within the given time.

== Current Composition ==
Keys: BJP (13) INC (5) SP (1) AITC (1) DMK (1) TDP (1) RJD (1) AAP (1) NCP (1) BJD (1) AIADMK (1) CPI (1) VCK (1) ZPM (1) IND (1) = 31 members

Party-wise membership of Standing Committee on Defence
1. BJP (41.9%)
2. INC (16.1%)
3. SP (3.22%)
4. AITC (3.22%)
5. DMK (3.22%)
6. TDP (3.22%)
7. RJD (3.22%)
8. AAP (3.22%)
9. NCP (3.22%)
10. BJD (3.22%)
11. AIADMK (3.22%)
12. CPI (3.22%)
13. VCK (3.22%)
14. ZPM (3.22%)
15. IND (3.22%)

21 Members from 18th Lok Sabha; tenure – 2024–25
| Sr. No. | Portrait | Name | Constituency, state | Party |
|---|---|---|---|---|
| 1 | | Radha Mohan Singh^{(Note: Chairperson of the committee for the current year.)} | Purvi Champaran, Bihar | BJP |
| 2 | | Rajeev Bhardwaj | Kangra, Himachal Pradesh | BJP |
| 3 | | Ranjit Dutta | Tezpur, Assam | BJP |
| 4 | | Ravi Kishan | Gorakhpur, Uttar Pradesh | BJP |
| 5 | | Shashank Mani | Deoria, Uttar Pradesh | BJP |
| 6 | | Lumbaram Choudhary | Jalore, Rajasthan | BJP |
| 7 | | Bishnu Pada Ray | Andaman and Nicobar Islands | BJP |
| 8 | | Jagannath Sarkar | Ranaghat, West Bengal | BJP |
| 9 | | Jagadish Shettar | Belgaum, Karnataka | BJP |
| 10 | | Rahul Gandhi | Raebareli, Uttar Pradesh | INC |
| 11 | | Karti Chidambaram | Sivaganga, Tamil Nadu | INC |
| 12 | | Captain Viriato Fernandes | South Goa, Goa | INC |
| 13 | | Jothimani | Karur, Tamil Nadu | INC |
| 14 | | Virendra Singh | Chandauli, Uttar Pradesh | SP |
| 15 | | Deepak Adhikari | Ghatal, West Bengal | AITC |
| 16 | | S. Jagathrakshakan | Arakkonam, Tamil Nadu | DMK |
| 17 | | Kesineni Chinni | Vijayawada, Andhra Pradesh | TDP |
| 18 | | Selvaraj V | Nagapattinam, Tamil Nadu | CPI |
| 19 | | Thol. Thirumavalavan | Chidambaram, Tamil Nadu | VCK |
| 20 | | Richard Vanlalhmangaiha | Mizoram | ZPM |
| 21 | | Mohmad Haneefa | Ladakh | IND |
Notes

10 Members from the Rajya Sabha
| Sr. No. | Name | State Legislature | Party |
|---|---|---|---|
| 1 | Naresh Bansal | Uttarakhand | BJP |
| 2 | Sudhanshu Trivedi | Uttar Pradesh | BJP |
| 3 | Naveen Jain | Uttar Pradesh | BJP |
| 4 | Dhairyashil Patil | Maharashtra | BJP |
| 5 | Shaktisinh Gohil | Gujarat | INC |
| 6 | Prem Chand Gupta | Bihar | RJD |
| 7 | Sanjay Singh | Delhi | AAP |
| 8 | Praful Patel | Maharashtra | NCP |
| 9 | Munna Khan | Odisha | BJD |
| 10 | N. Chandrasegharan | Tamil Nadu | AIADMK |

== Comments in recent years ==
=== Rafale Fighter MMRCFA acquisition case (2013) ===
The $8.9 billion deal for the purchase of 36 Rafale aircraft from France was delayed due to the Agusta Westland bribery scandal and a cautious stance taken by the government of India. The committee commented on the delay saying – "The committee are unhappy to note that although a considerable time has elapsed, negotiations with France on Rafale (fighter aircraft) could not be taken to a logical end".

"The committee takes serious view of the fact that our squadron strength is already short of what has been authorized by the Government and moreover, insufficiency in number of available pilots in the Air Force further deteriorates our operational capabilities," said the parliament panel headed by Major General (retd.) B.C Khanduri.

=== Surgical Strikes(2016) ===
After initial reluctance, the army briefed members of the SCOD during October 2016. One of the members said – "A brief statement was made by the army on the sensitive issue. But no questions were taken". However, this statement was countered by the statement issued by minority members MP Ambika Soni and MP Madhusudhan Mistry – "The decision not to brief the committee over surgical strikes under the garb of secrecy only amounts to 'lack of confidence' in the Members of Parliament, who are in the committee and who are bound by the oath of secrecy. This position is absolutely unacceptable to us".

=== Operational Preparedness (2015–2018) ===
During April 2015, SCOD highlighted for the first time the disturbing state of defence. In its seventh and eighth report on Demands of Grants, the SCOD said that while the sanctioned strength was 42, Indian Air Force at present has 35 active squadrons – "With regard to this, representatives of air force deposed before the committee that a drawdown has already begun and, by 2022, air force will have around just 25 squadrons, thereby losing even the slight edge over rival neighbouring nation" , the panel additionally said in the same report, that IAF would need 45 squadrons to counter "two front collusive threat".

During March 2018 deposition of Vice Chief of Army Staff Sarath Chand, it was stated that – "Funds allocated is insufficient and the army is finding it difficult to even stock arms, ammunition, spares for 10-day intensive war. All the three services are expected to be prepared for at least 10 days of intense battle." Following this testimony, the defence minister, Ms. Nirmala Sitharam said that Ministry of Defence (MOD) has been trying to shore up all the shortages however the forces would have to prioritize and rationalize. However the SCOD recommended and the government via the Ministry of Defence (MOD) followed up eventually by increasing the financial powers of all three vice chiefs up to ₹500 crore (equivalent to ₹730 crore or US$78 million in 2026)

== Chairpersons ==
=== Chairpersons of the committee (1993-till date) ===
| Sr. No. | Name | Term of office | Terms | Political party (Alliance) |
|---|---|---|---|---|
| 1 | Buta Singh | 1993–95 | 2 | INC |
| 2 | No Public records found | 1995-98 | 3 | |
| 3 | Kamal Chaudhary | 1998–99 | 1 | INC |
| 4 | Laxminarayan Pandey | 1999–2002 | 3 | BJP |
| 5 | Madan Lal Khurana | 2002–04 | 2 | BJP |
| 6 | Balasaheb Vikhe Patil | 2004–08 | 4 | INC |
| 7 | Satpal Maharaj | 2008–11 | 4 | INC |
| 8 | Raj Babbar | 2012–14 | 2 | INC |
| 9 | Maj Gen. BC Khanduri (Retd.) | 2014–17 | 3 | BJP |
| 10 | Kalraj Mishra | 2017–19 | 2 | BJP |
| 11 | Jual Oram | 2019–present | 1 | BJP |

== Reports published ==
As part of its oversight process the committee has published quite a number of reports over the course of its existence. The committee has published a total of 87 reports from 1993 to 2010. Out of these, 18 are reports on Demands for Grants (DFGs), 25 reports on subjects taken up by the committee, 5 reports on bills referred to the committee and 36 are reports on action taken by the government on corresponding reports of the committee.

| Lok Sabha | Tenure | Demands for Grants(DFGs) | Subjects | Bills | ATRs | Total Reports Presented |
|---|---|---|---|---|---|---|
| 10th Lok Sabha | 1991–96 | 3 | 2 | - | 3 | 8 |
| 11th Lok Sabha | 1996–97 | 2 | - | 2 | 2 | 6 |
| 12th Lok Sabha | 1998–99 | 2 | 4 | - | 2 | 8 |
| 13th Lok Sabha | 1999–04 | 4 | 4 | 1 | 12 | 21 |
| 14th Lok Sabha | 2004–09 | 5 | 14 | 2 | 15 | 36 |
| 15th Lok Sabha | 2009–14 | 2 | 1 | - | 2 | 5 |
| 16th Lok Sabha | 2014– continuing | | | | | |

== See also ==
- 17th Lok Sabha
- Estimates Committee
- Committee on Public Undertakings
- Public Accounts Committee (India)
- Standing Committee on Home Affairs
- Standing Committee on Finance
- List of Indian parliamentary committees
