= List of Indian commissions =

Commissions are constituted by the Government of India either on an ad hoc or permanent basis, to guide, advise or provide solutions to various issues coming under the concerned ministry.

== List of commissions ==
=== Permanent commissions ===
No.	Commission	Formed	Description	Ministry/Department	Website
1	Atomic Energy Commission of India	1948	Replaces the 'Indian Atomic Energy Commission' created on 3 August 1948 under the late Department of Scientific Research, July 1948; Plan and implement various measures on sound technical and economic principles and free from all non-essential restrictions or needlessly elastic rules in the field of atomic energy	Department of Atomic Energy	aec.gov.in
2	Commission for Agricultural Costs and Prices	1965	Stabilize agricultural prices; Meaningful real income levels to farmers; Essential agricultural commodities at reasonable prices	Ministry of Agriculture	cacp.dacner.nic.in
3	National Commission for Backward Classes	1993	Consider inclusions in and exclusions from the lists of castes notified as backward for the purpose of job reservations; Advice to the Central Government on such matters	Ministry of Social Justice and Empowerment	ncdc.nic.in
4	National Commission on Cattle	2002	Suggest ways of improving the condition of cattle	Ministry of Agriculture	dahd.nic.in
5	Competition Commission of India	2003	Enforce The Competition Act, 2002 throughout India; Prevent activities that have an adverse effect on competition in India.		cci.gov.in
6	National Statistical Commission	2005	Reduce the problems faced by statistical agencies in the country in relation to collection of data.; Special emphasis on ensuring collection of unbiased data so as to restore public trust in the figures released by the Government.	Ministry of Statistics and Programme Implementation	mospi.nic.in
7	Telecom Commission	1989	responsible for policy formulation, licensing, wireless spectrum management, administrative monitoring of PSUs, research and development and standardization/validation of equipment etc.	Ministry of Communications and Information Technology	dot.gov.in
8	Election Commission	1950	Constitutional Autonomous Body: conducts the elections to the offices of the President and Vice-President of India, parliament, State Legislative assemblies and legislative councils	Autonomous statutory body	eci.nic.in
9	Chief Labour Commissioner	1945	Prevention and settlement of industrial disputes through conciliation/mediation.; Enforcement of Labour Laws and Rules made there under in Central Sphere.; Quasi-Judicial functions.; Verification of Trade Union membership etc.		clc.gov.in
10	Planning Commission	1950	Formulates India's Five-Year Plans, among other functions		planningcommission.nic.in / planningcommission.org
11	Law Commission	1955	Reforming the Law For Maximising Justice in Society and Promoting Good Governance under the Rule of Law	Ministry of Law and Justice	lawcommissionofindia.nic.in
12	Finance Commission	1951	*Adjudicates on the sharing of resources between center and states		fincomindia.nic.in
13	National Human Rights Commission of India	1993		Autonomous statutory body	nhrc.nic.in
14	University Grants Commission	1953	Coordination, determination and maintenance of standards of university education.; It provides recognition to universities in India, and disburses funds to such recognized universities and college.	Ministry of Human Resource Development	ugc.ac.in
15	Vigilance Commission (CVC)	1964	To address governmental corruption		cvc.nic.in
16	Knowledge Commission	2005			knowledgecommission.gov.in
17	National Commission for Women	1992	protecting and promoting the interests of women in India		ncw.nic.in
18	Scheduled Tribes Commission	2004	protection, welfare and development & advancement of the Scheduled Tribes		ncst.nic.in
19	Commission for Enterprises in the Unorganized Sector	2004		Ministry of Micro, Small and Medium Enterprises	nceuis.nic.in
20	Census Commission	1872		Ministry of Home Affairs	
21	Central Forestry Commission	1965			
22	Central Water Commission	1945		Ministry of Water Resources, River Development and Ganga Rejuvenation	
23	Electronics Commission	1971			
24	Commission for Additional Sources of Energy	1981			
25	Rashtriya Barh Ayog (National Flood Commission)	1976		Ministry of Water Resources, River Development and Ganga Rejuvenation	
26	Indo-Bangladesh Joint River Commission	1972			
27	Khadi and Village Industries Commission	1957		Ministry of Micro, Small and Medium Enterprises	kvic.org.in
28	Space Commission	1962			isro.gov.in
29	Staff Selection Commission	1976		Department of Personnel and Training	ssc.nic.in
30	National Judicial Appointments commission		Transferring of judges to higher judiciary		
31	Union Public Service Commission	1926	Conduct examinations for appointment to the services of the Union; Direct recruitment by selection through interviews.; Appointment of officers on promotion / deputation / absorption.; Framing and amendment of Recruitment Rules for various services and posts under the Government.; Disciplinary cases relating to different Civil Services.; Advising the Government on any matter referred to the Commission by the President of India		upsc.gov.in
32	Pay Commission		Pay Commission is set up by Government of India, and gives its recommendations regarding changes in salary structure of its employees		
33	National Commission for Minorities	1992		Ministry of Minority Affairs	
34	Central Information Commission	2005			
35	Commission for Air Quality Management in NCR and Adjoining Areas	2021	For better co-ordination, research, identification and resolution of problems surrounding the air quality index of National Capital Region & adjoining areas and for matters connected therewith or incidental thereto.; to take all such measures, issue directions and entertain complaints, as it deems necessary or expedient, for the purpose of protecting and improving the quality of the air in the National Capital Region and adjoining areas; co-ordination of actions by the Governments of the National Capital Territory of Delhi and the States of Punjab, Haryana, Rajasthan and Uttar Pradesh for the above said purpose.	Ministry of Environment, Forest and Claimate Change	caqm.nic.in

=== Ad hoc commissions ===
No.	Commission	Year	Objectives
1	States Reorganisation Commission	1955	Recommend the reorganization of state boundaries
2	Kothari Commission	1964	To formulate the general principles and guidelines for the development of education at all levels; To advise the government on a standardized national pattern of education in India
3	Kapur Commission	1966	To inquiry into the conspiracy that led to the assassination of Mahatma Gandhi
4	Khosla Commission	1970	Investigate the death of Subhas Chandra Bose in 1945
5	Shah Commission	1977	To inquire into all the excesses committed during the Indian Emergency (1975 - 77).
6	Mandal Commission	1979	Identified over 450 backward classes comprising 52% of the country's population; Recommended 27% of the seats in academic institutions and jobs in Govt. organisations for these classes.
7	Sarkaria Commission	1983	To examine the balance of power between centre and state and suggest reforms; Gave appropriate recommendations on appointment of Governor.
8	Liberhan Commission	1992	To investigate the destruction of the disputed structure Babri Masjid
9	Nanavati Commission	2000	Investigate the 1984 anti-Sikh riots
10	Narendran Commission	2000	Study and report the representation of Backward Classes in the State public services.
11	National Commission to review the working of the Constitution	2000	Suggested changes in the electoral laws, setting up a national judicial commission for appointing judges and election of the Prime Minister by Lok Sabha.
12	Nanavati-Mehta Commission	2002	To probe the Godhra train burning incident and the post-Godhra carnage, 2002
13	Commission for Religious and Linguistic Minorities	2004	To look into various issues related to Linguistic and Religious minorities in India
14	Mukherjee Commission	2005	Investigate the death of Subhas Chandra Bose in 1945

== See also ==
- Standing committees of India
- List of Indian parliamentary committees
