= Board of Finance =

Board of Finance or Finance Board may refer to:

- Federal Housing Finance Board in the United States
- Campaign Finance Board of New York City in the United States
- Local boards of finance throughout New England in the United States
- Board of Finance of imperial China between the Tang and Qing dynasties

== See also ==
- Ministry of Finance
- Committee on Finance (disambiguation)
