= Committee on the Judiciary =

Committee on the Judiciary may mean:

- United States House Committee on the Judiciary
- United States Senate Committee on the Judiciary
- Personnel, Public Grievances, Law and Justice (Parliament of India)
