= Economic affairs =

Economic affairs may refer to:

- The economy
- Economic Affairs (journal)

== See also ==
- Economic Affairs Committee (disambiguation)
