= Economic Affairs Committee =

Economic Affairs Committee may refer to:

- Economic Affairs Committee (African Union)
- Economic Affairs Committee (French National Assembly)
- Economic Affairs Committee (House of Lords) (UK)
- Economic Affairs Committee of the Chinese People's Political Consultative Conference
- Economic Affairs and Trade Committee (Iceland)
- European Parliament Committee on Economic and Monetary Affairs

== See also ==
- Committee on Finance (disambiguation)
- Public Accounts Committee
  - Public Accounts Committee (India)
- Estimates Committee (India)
