= Standing committee (India) =

Permanent legislative panel of the Parliament of India

In the Indian Parliament, a Standing committee is a committee consisting of Members of Parliament (MP). It is a permanent and regular committee which is constituted from time to time according to the provisions of an Act of Parliament or Rules of Procedure and Conduct of Business.

== Functions and organization ==
The work done by the Indian Parliament is not only voluminous but also of a complex nature, hence a great deal of its work is carried out in these Parliamentary committees.

Both Houses of Parliament, Rajya Sabha and Lok Sabha, have similar committee structures with a few exceptions. Their appointment, terms of office, functions and procedures of conducting business are broadly similar. These standing committees are elected or appointed every year, or periodically by the Chairman of the Rajya Sabha or the Speaker of the Lok Sabha, or as a result of consultation between them.

=== There are two types of Parliamentary committee, Standing committee and Ad hoc committee. ===
1. The Standing committees are constituted every year or frequently and they work on continuous basis.
2. Ad hoc committees are temporary and created for specific task. Once that task is completed, the ad hoc committees cease to exist.

== Classification ==
Standing committees are broadly classified as follows:

- Standing committee of Rajya Sabha
- Standing committee of Lok Sabha
- Departmentally related Standing committee under Rajya Sabha
- Departmentally related Standing committee under Lok Sabha.

== Functions ==
Based on the functions, standing committees can be broadly classified in following categories:

- Committees to Enquire
- Committees to scrutinize and control
- Committees relating to day-to-day business of the House
- House Keeping committees
- Passing a Bill
- Department wise committee to scrutiny Union budget.

== See also ==
- List of Indian parliamentary committees
- List of Indian commissions
