= Tek Fog =

Social media misinformation controversy

Tek Fog was the name used in a January 2022 investigative series published by the Indian news website The Wire. The reports alleged that an application of that name was being used by people linked to the Bharatiya Janata Party (BJP) to automate social media activity, manipulate trending topics and target critics of the party. The allegations attracted political and media attention, but the reports were withdrawn in October 2022 after questions arose about the verification of other reporting by one of the same authors. The Wire removed its Tek Fog reports pending internal review, and the Editors Guild of India withdrew references it had made to the investigation, citing serious questions about the veracity of the reporting.

== Initial story ==
Alerted by a supposed disgruntled employee-turned-whistleblower, the Indian news publication The Wire reportedly conducted a two-year investigation and published its findings in January 2022. This report claimed that the Tek Fog application was used "to artificially inflate the popularity of the Bharatiya Janata Party, harass its critics and manipulate public perceptions at scale across major social media platforms" and to "amplify right-wing propaganda".

The Wire investigation also claimed that the BJP, along with the private companies Persistent Systems and Mohalla Tech (which operates a service called ShareChat), were involved in deploying the app. The members of BJP's youth wing, Bharatiya Janata Yuva Morcha (BJYM), were said to have supervised the operators, giving them ideological directions. The investigation also claimed that an unnamed internal source within Persistent Systems found 17,000 files connected to Tek Fog which were developed by Persistent Systems.

In January 2022, Devang Dave, head of the BJYM IT Cell, denied that he or anyone from his organisation knew about such an app. Persistent Systems and Mohalla Tech denied any involvement with each other or with Tek Fog. The BJP youth wing functionary Devang Dave, who was claimed to have supervised the operation, denied the party's involvement.

On 23 October 2022, The Wire removed its Tek Fog investigation from its website, "pending the outcome of an internal review". The Wire has accused one of the story's authors of "deception" in a separate series of articles on Meta.

=== Claimed features ===
The Wire's report described the app as being capable of several actions. These capabilities purportedly included being able to hijack the '"trending"' section of social media sites, Twitter and Facebook, bulk-hacking of inactive WhatsApp accounts, among other functionalities.

Other features supposedly included promoting favourable viewpoints through misinformation targeting users perceived to be BJP party opponents. Tek Fog was also alleged to have managed a huge database of Indian citizens which included specific data regarding their occupation, religion, age, gender, etc., which was then used to deliver targeted insults and criticism.

=== Alleged victims ===
The Delhi Union of Journalists (DUJ) released a statement condemning the app stating that women journalists were "prime targets of the app" and noting that The Wire investigation listed several women journalists who received up to one million abusive tweets between January and May 2021, including Rana Ayyub, Barkha Dutt, Nidhi Razdan, Rohini Singh, Swati Chaturvedi, Sagarika Ghose, Manisha Pande, Faye D'Souza, Arfa Khanum Sherwani and Smita Prakash.

On 9 January 2022, journalist Arfa Khanum Sherwani released a list of prominent women from several religions including Hindus whom Sherwani alleged were targeted and harassed by hackers using Tek Fog.

== Reactions ==
The Editors Guild of India initially said The Wire investigation "laid bare an extensive and well funded network built around [the] app". It condemned "the continuing online harassment of women journalists" and called for "urgent steps to break and dismantle this misogynistic and abusive digital eco-system". The Guild later retracted its statements after The Wire removed the original articles, citing concerns about accuracy and insufficient "journalistic norms and checks".

Opposition parties denounced the app as a national security threat and demanded a probe. Rajya Sabha MP Derek O'Brien of the Trinamool Congress called for a meeting of the Parliamentary Standing Committee on Home Affairs to discuss the app and said it "has serious ramifications and could jeopardise national security." The Indian National Congress (INC), in a tweet from its official Twitter handle, called Tek Fog, "a poisonous weapon of the BJP's propaganda machinery". Congress leader Rahul Gandhi called the app one of several "factories of hate" set up by the BJP.

There were also multiple calls for the Supreme Court to intervene in this matter. Congress leaders requested the examination from the expert panel that was looking into the alleged use of the Pegasus spyware on Indian citizens.

The Minister of State for Home in the Maharashtra government, Satej Patil of the INC, questioned the silence of the Government of India and Information and Technology ministry over the Tek Fog expose. He made a public appeal to the victims from Mumbai targeted by Tek Fog app to register a police complaint.

Anand Venkatnarayanan, an Indian internet security researcher, called the app a military-grade psychological operations weapon. He claimed that the capabilities that are part of Tek Fog had only been accessible to state actors, and that putting it in the hands of non-state actors affiliated to a political party "had never been done before".

=== Investigation by Parliamentary Standing Committee on Home Affairs ===
On 10 January 2022, O'Brien wrote a second letter to convene a meeting to discuss Tek Fog, pointing out that the alleged hacking technique was formerly used by the Pegasus spyware. The application, as alleged by O'Brien, could send automated messages, spread misinformation, fake news and mislead citizens. On 12 January, Congress leader and leader of the opposition in the Lok Sabha Adhir Ranjan Chowdhury also wrote to the chairman of the Parliamentary Standing Committee on Home Affairs, Anand Sharma, asking the committee discuss the "violative software application Tek Fog" in their next meeting. On 12 January, The Hindu reported that Anand Sharma wrote to the Ministry of Home Affairs of the Government of India seeking a response on questions surrounding Tek Fog.

The Parliamentary Standing Committee asked the Union Home Ministry to provide information about the Tek Fog app. On 12 February, responding to the request, the Minister of State for Electronics and Information Technology Rajeev Chandrasekhar stated, "The ministry has searched for the app on all prominent app stores and APK stores and could not find so called app in any of these online stores."

== Retraction and apology ==
On 23 October 2022, The Wire took down its Tek Fog story "for review" due to claims of misconduct in another investigation done by the same journalist. On 27 October 2022, The Wire issued a formal apology to its readers for the publication of these stories.

== See also ==
- The Wire (India)
