= List of committees of the Parliament of India =

Indian parliamentary committees

View chart definition.
Percentage of bills referred to Parliamentary committees for examination.

The Parliamentary committees are established to study and deal with various matters that cannot be directly handled by the legislature due to their volume. They also monitor the functioning of the executive branch.

The Parliamentary committees are of two kinds – standing or permanent committees and ad hoc committees. The former are elected or appointed periodically and they work on a continuous basis. The latter are created on an ad hoc basis as the need arises and they are dissolved after they complete the task assigned to them.

== Standing committees ==
A standing committee is a committee consisting of Members of Parliament. It is a permanent and regular committee which is constituted from time to time according to the provisions of an Act of Parliament or Rules of Procedure and Conduct of Business. The work done by the Indian Parliament is not only voluminous but also of a complex nature, hence a good deal of its work is carried out in these Parliamentary committees.

Standing committees are of the following kinds :

1. Financial standing committees (FSC)
2. Department related standing committees (DRSC)
3. Other standing committees (OSC)

=== Financial standing committees ===
There are three important standing committees dealing with financial affairs. These committees involve further sub-committees.

1. Public Accounts Committee – It examines various expenditure reports and accounts under the purview of the Parliament. Till 1921, a senior member of the ruling party used to be appointed by the Speaker as chairman of the committee. In 1921, it was established under the provision of the Government of India Act 1919 and has since been in existence. However, for the first time, a member from the Opposition in Lok Sabha, was appointed as the chairman of the committee by the Speaker of the Lok Sabha. This practice continues till date.
2. Estimates Committee – The committee on Estimates, constituted for the first time in 1950, is a committee consisting of 30 members, elected every year by the Lok Sabha from amongst its Members.
3. Public Undertakings Committee – It analyses the accounts, and workings of the state owned PSU firms. It also keeps a check on the disinvestment policies of the various PSUs.

Finance Committees Details for the 18th Lok Sabha (2024 – 2025); Updated as of September 2024
S.No.	Committee	Chairperson	Composition	Tenure	Nominated / elected	Sub-committees
1	Public Accounts Committee	K. C. Venugopal	22 members (15 LS + 7 RS)	1 Year	Elected from Lok Sabha & Rajya Sabha MPs	Sub-Committee – I : Non Compliance in Timely submission of Action Taken Notes on the Non-selected Audit Paragraphs & Excess Expenditure Sub-Committee – II : Direct and Indirect Taxes; Sub-Committee – III : Implementation of Recommendations of PAC; Sub-Committee – IV : Railways
2	Estimates Committee	Sanjay Jaiswal	30 members (LS)	1 Year	Elected from Lok Sabha MPs	Sub-Committee – I : Drought situation in the country pertaining to the Ministry of Agriculture and Farmers Welfare Sub-Committee – II : Education with special reference to the recent development regarding autonomy in Education
3	Public Undertakings Committee	Baijayant Panda	22 members (15 LS + 7 RS)	1 Year	Elected from Lok Sabha & Rajya Sabha MPs	*Currently None*

=== Department-related standing committees ===
During the year 1989 – 8th Lok Sabha the Rules Committee considered and approved a proposal that three subject committees, on (i) Agriculture; (ii) Environment & Forests; and (iii) Science & Technology. related to these committees were finally approved by the House and the committees were formally constituted with effect from 18 August 1989.

The Reports of Rules Committees of the 10th Lok Sabha and Rajya Sabha adopted by the two Houses on 29 March 1993 paved the way for the setting up of the 17 departmentally related standing committees covering under their jurisdiction all the Ministries/Departments of the Union Government.

These DRSCs replaced the earlier three subject committees constituted in August, 1989. The 17 departmentally related standing committees were formally constituted with effect from April, 1993. After experiencing the working of the DRSC system for over a decade, the system was re-structured in July, 2004 wherein the number of DRSCs was increased from 17 to 24. Till 13th Lok Sabha, each of these standing committees used to consist of 45 members— 30 nominated by the Speaker from amongst the members of Lok Sabha and 15 members nominated by the Chairperson, Rajya Sabha from amongst the members of Rajya Sabha. However, with re-structuring of DRSCs in July, 2004 each DRSC consists of 31 members—21 from Lok Sabha and 10 from Rajya Sabha.

There are 24 department-related standing committees (DRSCs). Each of these committees have 31 members – 21 from Lok Sabha and 10 from Rajya Sabha. These members are to be nominated by the Chairperson of Rajya Sabha or the Speaker of Lok Sabha respectively. The term of office of these committees does not exceed one year. These committees are serviced either by Lok Sabha secretariat or the Rajya Sabha secretariat, depending on who has appointed the chairperson of that committee.

Department-related Standing Committees Details for the 18th Lok Sabha (2024 – 2025); Updated as of September 2024
S.No.	Committee	Ministries	Chairperson	Tenure	Chairperson nominated by
1	Committee on Agriculture,Food Processing and Animal Husbandary	Agriculture and Farmers Welfare; Food Processing Industries; Animal Husbandry, Dairying and Fisheries	Charanjit Singh Channi	1 year	Speaker of Lok Sabha
2	Committee on Chemicals and Fertilizers	Chemicals and Fertilizers	Kirti Azad	1 year	Speaker of Lok Sabha
3	Committee on Coal, Mines and Steel	Coal; Mines; Steel	Anurag Singh Thakur	1 year	Speaker of Lok Sabha
4	Committee on Commerce	Commerce and Industry	Dola Sen	1 year	Chairperson of Rajya Sabha
5	Committee on Defence	Defence	Radha Mohan Singh	1 year	Speaker of Lok Sabha
6	Committee on Energy	Power; New and Renewable Energy	Shrirang Barne	1 year	Speaker of Lok Sabha
7	Committee on External Affairs	External Affairs	Shashi Tharoor	1 year	Speaker of Lok Sabha
8	Committee on Finance	Finance; Planning (NITI Aayog); Corporate Affairs; Statistics and Programme Implementation	Bhartruhari Mahtab	1 year	Speaker of Lok Sabha
9	Committee on Food, Consumer Affairs and Public Distribution	Consumer Affairs, Food and Public Distribution	Kanimozhi	1 year	Speaker of Lok Sabha
10	Committee on Health and Family Welfare	Health and Family Welfare; AYUSH	Ram Gopal Yadav	1 year	Chairperson of Rajya Sabha
11	Committee on Home Affairs	Home Affairs; Development of North Eastern Region	Radha Mohan Das Agarwal	1 year	Chairperson of Rajya Sabha
12	Committee on Education	Education; Skill Development and Entrepreneurship; Women and Child Development; Youth Affairs and Sports	Digvijaya Singh	1 year	Chairperson of Rajya Sabha
13	Committee on Industry	Heavy Industries; Micro, Small and Medium Enterprises	Tiruchi Siva	1 year	Chairperson of Rajya Sabha
14	Committee on Communication and Information Technology	Communications; Electronics and Information Technology; Information and Broadcasting	Nishikant Dubey	1 year	Speaker of Lok Sabha
15	Committee on Labour, Textiles and Skill Development	Labour and Employment; Textiles; Skill Development	Basavaraj Bommai	1 year	Speaker of Lok Sabha
16	Committee on Personnel, Public Governances, Law and Justice	Law and Justice; Personnel, Public Grievances and Pensions	Brij Lal	1 year	Chairperson of Rajya Sabha
17	Committee on Petroleum and Natural Gas	Petroleum and Natural Gas	Sunil Tatkare	1 year	Speaker of Lok Sabha
18	Committee on Railways	Railways	C. M. Ramesh	1 year	Speaker of Lok Sabha
19	Committee on Rural Development and Panchayati Raj	Rural Development; Panchayati Raj	Saptagiri Sankar Ulaka	1 year	Speaker of Lok Sabha
20	Committee on Science & Technology and Environment & Forests	Science and Technology; Atomic Energy; Space; Earth Sciences; Environment, Forests and Climate Change	Bhubaneswar Kalita	1 year	Chairperson of Rajya Sabha
21	Committee on Social Justice and Empowerment	Social Justice and Empowerment; Tribal Affairs; Minority Affairs	P. C. Mohan	1 year	Speaker of Lok Sabha
22	Committee on Transport, Tourism and Culture	Civil Aviation; Culture; Road Transport and Highways; Shipping; Tourism	Sanjay Kumar Jha	1 year	Chairperson of Rajya Sabha
23	Committee on Housing and Urban Affairs	Ministry of Housing and Urban Affairs	Magunta Sreenivasulu Reddy	1 year	Speaker of Lok Sabha
24	Committee on Water Resources	* Ministry of Jal Shakti	Rajiv Pratap Rudy	1 year	Speaker of Lok Sabha

=== Other standing committees ===
Other Standing Committees Details for the 17th Lok Sabha (2019 – 2024); Updated as of January 2025
S.No.	Committee	Chairperson	Composition	Tenure	Nominated / elected
1	Business Advisory Committee	Om Birla	15 members	Not fixed. May continue in office till reconstituted.	Nominated
2	Committee of Privileges	Sunil Kumar Singh	15 members	Not fixed. May continue in office till reconstituted.	Nominated
3	Committee on Absence of Members from the sittings of the House	Ravneet Singh	15 members	1 Year	Nominated
4	Committee on Empowerment of Women	Daggubati Purandeswari	30 members (20 LS+ 10 RS)	1 Year	Nominated
5	Committee on Government Assurances	Rajendra Agrawal	15 members	1 Year	Nominated
6	Committee on Papers Laid on the Table	Girish Chandra	15 members	1 Year	Nominated
7	Committee on Petitions	Harish Dwivedi	15 members	1 Year	Nominated
8	Committee on Private Members' Bills and Resolutions	M. Thambidurai	15 members	1 Year	Nominated
9	Committee on Subordinate Legislation	Vallabhaneni Balashowry	15 members	1 Year	Nominated
10	General Purposes Committee **	Om Birla	Varies	Not fixed.	Ex-Officio
11	House Committee	Mahesh Sharma	12 members	1 Year	Nominated
12	Joint Committee on Offices of Profit	Etela Rajender	15 members (10 LS+ 5 RS)	For the duration of one Lok Sabha	Elected
13	Joint Committee on Salaries and Allowance of MPs	Rita Bahuguna Joshi	15 members (10 LS+ 5 RS)	1 Year	Nominated
14	Library Committee	Nama Nageswara Rao	9 members (6 LS+ 3 RS)	1 Year	Nominated
15	Rules Committee	Om Birla	15 members	Not fixed. May continue in office till reconstituted.	Nominated
16	Committee on the Welfare of Scheduled Castes & Scheduled Tribes	Faggan Singh Kulaste	30 members (20 LS+ 10 RS)	1 Year	Elected

** In each House there is a GPC. All members are ex-officio members by virtue of being chairmen of respective standing committees and leaders of respective parties.

== Ad hoc committees ==
As of August 2018, the following ad hoc committees are in operation:

Ad hoc Committees Details for the 16th Lok Sabha (2014 – 2019); Updated as of August 2018
S.No.	Committee	Chairperson	Tenure	Composition
1	Committee on Ethics	L. K. Advani	1 year	15 members (15 LS )
2	Committee on Food Management in Parliament House Complex	A. P. Jithender Reddy	1 Year	15 members (10 LS + 5 RS)
3	Committee on Installation of Portraits/Statues of National leaders and Parliamentarians	Sumitra Mahajan	For the duration of one Lok Sabha	12 members (8 LS + 4 RS)
4	Committee on Members of Parliament Local Area Development Scheme	M. Thambidurai	1 Year	24 members
5	Committee on Provision of Computers to Members of Lok Sabha	P. Kumar	For the duration of one Lok Sabha	10 members
6	Joint Committee on Maintenance of Heritage Character and Development of Parliament House Complex	Sumitra Mahajan	For the duration of one Lok Sabha	10 members (7 LS + 3 RS)
7	Joint Committee on Security in Parliament House Complex	Sumitra Mahajan	1 Year	10 members (7 LS + 3 RS)
8	Railway Convention Committee	Bhartruhari Mahtab	For the duration of one Lok Sabha	18 members (12 LS + 6 RS)
9	Committee on Violation of Protocol Norms and Contemptuous Behaviour of Government Officers with Members of Lok Sabha	Rayapati Sambasiva Rao	For the duration of one Lok Sabha	15 members
10	Committee to Inquiry into the Improper Conduct of a Member	Kirit Somaiya	**For the year 2016 only**	9 members

== Notable ad hoc committees ==
The Government of India has appointed a number of committees ad-hoc committees. Some of the notable ad-hoc committees are as follows :

=== Pre-independence ===
Committee	Appointed in	Submitted report in	Mandate	Recommendations
Rowlatt Committee	December 1917	April 1918		

=== After Independence ===
Committee	Appointed in	Submitted report in	Summary	Report
Shah Nawaz Committee	1955	1956	The three-member committee was formed by the Nehru-government to address the public demand to investigate the disappearance of Subhas Chandra Bose. The committee was led by Shah Nawaz Khan, and included Suresh Chandra Bose, brother of Subhas, and S. N. Maitra.	The committee came to the conclusion that Bose was killed in a plane crash. But, Suresh Chandra Bose did not agree with the report.
Balwant Rai Mehta Committee	1957	1957	Examine the working of the Community Development Programme and the National Extension Service	Establishment of the scheme of 'democratic decentralisation' (Panchayati Raj)
Ashok Mehta Committee	1977	1978	In December 1977, the Janata Government appointed a committee on Panchayati Raj institutions under the chairpersonship of Ashoka Mehta.	The committee submitted its report in August 1978 and made 132 recommendations to revive and strengthen the declining Panchayati Raj system in the country
JVP Committee			Review Dhar Commission's report on formation of States	
Narasimham Committee	1998	1998		various Banking sector reforms
Sachar Committee	2005	2006	Examine social, economic and educational condition of the Muslim community of India	
Srikrishna Committee	2010	2010	The committee was formed to look into the demand for separate statehood for Telangana or keep the State united in the present form, Andhra Pradesh.	
Naresh Chandra Committee		2012	Defence reforms	
Swaran Singh Committee	1976		to make recommendations about fundamental duties	The committee recommended the inclusion of a separate chapter on fundamental duties in the Constitution. It stressed that the citizens should become conscious that in addition to the enjoyment of rights, they also have certain duties to perform as well.

== See also ==
- Standing committees of India
- List of Indian commissions
