= Committee on Public Undertakings =

Indian Parliamentary financial committee

Financial Standing Committee
- 16th Lok Sabha
- Founded: 1 May 1964; 61 years ago
- Country: India

Leadership
- Chaiperson: Baijayant Panda
- Chairperson party: Bharatiya Janata Party
- Appointer: Lok Sabha Speaker

Structure
- Seats: 22; Lok Sabha : 15; Rajya Sabha : 7
- Party composition: BJP (9) INC (2); AIADMK (2); TDP (2); BJD (2); SAD (1); BRS (1) AITC (1)
- Election criteria: The members are elected every year from amongst its members of respective houses according to the principle of proportional representation.
- Tenure: 1 Year

Jurisdiction
- Purpose: Examining the reports and accounts of the Public sector undertakings(PSUs)

Rules & Procedure
- RULES OF PROCEDURE AND CONDUCT OF BUSINESS IN LOK SABHA
- Applicable rules: Rule 312A & 312B (page 115 - 116); Fourth Schedule (page 156)

The Committee on Public Undertakings (COPU) is one of three financial standing committees within the Parliament of India, composed of selected members of Parliament with the stated purpose of examining the reports and accounts of public sector undertakings (PSUs). The duties and responsibilities of the COPU are specified in the Fourth Schedule of the Rules of Procedure and Conduct of Business in Lok Sabha. This committee, alongside the Public Accounts Committee (PAC) and the Estimates Committee (EC), are the three financial standing committees of the Parliament of India.

The COPU consists of 22 members, 15 elected by the Lok Sabha, and not more than 7 members by the upper house, the Rajya Sabha. Committee members are elected annually from among members of both houses by means of proportional representation through the single transferable vote. The chairperson of the COPU is appointed by the Lok Sabha speaker. The term of the office of the members is one year. Ministers are not eligible to become a member of the committee. If a member, after being elected to the committee, becomes a Minister, the member ceases to be a member, from the date of such appointment.

== History ==
The first proposal for a separate public sector undertakings committee was made by Lanka Sundaram in December 1953, stating the inadequacies of both the Public Accounts Committee and the Estimates Committee regarding public undertakings. In May 1956, Ashok Mehta also proposed a separate committee for public undertakings, however the then finance minister held the view that the PAC and the EC were sufficient to handle the work load. By 1957, the government had agreed to form a standing sub-committee of the EC on public undertakings. In 1958, the congress formed the V. K. Krishna Menon committee. which put forward a number of recommendations intended to reconcile the accountability of public undertakings to parliament while keeping their autonomy on one hand and also ensuring efficiency on the other.

In September 1963, Minister of Commerce and Industry Nityanand Kanungo, put forward a motion in the Lok Sabha proposing the formation of a separate Parliamentary Committee on Public Undertakings. In pursuance of this motion, the Committee on Public Undertakings was formed in effect from May 1, 1964.

== Scope and Working ==
The responsibilities of the Committee on Public Undertakings are:

- To examine the reports and accounts of public undertakings specified in the fourth Schedule to the Rules of Procedure and Conduct of Business in Lok Sabha.
- To examine the reports, if any, of the Comptroller and Auditor General of India on the Public Undertakings.
- To examine, in the context of the autonomy and efficiency of the Public Undertakings whether the affairs of the Public Undertakings are being managed in accordance with sound business principles and prudent commercial practices.

The committee from time to time takes up for examination as such any PSU or subjects related to them as they may deem fit and which are within their terms of reference. The depth or Undertaking concerned is asked to furnish necessary material relating to those subjects for information of the Members of the Committee. The Committee may from time to time appoint one or more Study Groups for carrying out detailed examination of various subjects.

== Current composition ==
Key: BJP (10) INC (4) SP (1) AITC (1) DMK (1) TDP (1) JDU (1) SS (1) AAP (1) BJD (1) = 22 members

Composition of the Committee on Public Undertakings by party
1. INC (18.2%)
2. AITC (4.55%)
3. SP (4.55%)
4. BJP (45.5%)
5. DMK (4.55%)
6. TDP (4.55%)
7. JDU (4.55%)
8. SS (4.55%)
9. AAP (4.55%)
10. BJD (4.55%)

15 Members from 18th Lok Sabha; tenure – May 2024-25
Sr. No.	Name	Constituency, state	Party
1	Baijayant Panda (Note: Chairperson of the committee for the current year.)	Kendrapara, Odisha	BJP
2	Shankar Lalwani	Indore, Madhya Pradesh	BJP
3	Poonamben Maadam	Jamnagar, Gujarat	BJP
4	B. Y. Raghavendra	Shimoga, Karnataka	BJP
5	Mukesh Rajput	Farrukhabad, Uttar Pradesh	BJP
6	Pratap Chandra Sarangi	Balasore, Odisha	BJP
7	Chandra Prakash Joshi	Chittorgarh, Rajasthan	BJP
8	Tariq Anwar	Katihar, Bihar	INC
9	Sukhjinder Singh Randhawa	Gurdaspur, Punjab	INC
10	Kodikunnil Suresh	Mavelikara, Kerala	INC
11	R. K. Chaudhary	Mohanlalganj, Uttar Pradesh	SP
12	Sudip Bandyopadhyay	Kolkata Uttar, West Bengal	AITC
13	Kanimozhi	Thoothukudi, Tamil Nadu	DMK
14	Vemireddy Prabhakar Reddy	Nellore, Andhra Pradesh	TDP
15	Kaushalendra Kumar	Nalanda, Bihar	JDU

7 Members from the Rajya Sabha
Sr. No.	Name	State Legislature	Party
1	Bhagwat Karad	Maharashtra	BJP
2	Surendra Singh Nagar	Uttar Pradesh	BJP
3	Arun Singh	Uttar Pradesh	BJP
4	Neeraj Dangi	Rajasthan	INC
5	Milind Deora	Maharashtra	SS
6	N. D. Gupta	Delhi	AAP
7	Debashish Samantaray	Odisha	BJD

== List of Public Undertakings ==
The scope of COPU is limited to the undertakings specified in the fourth Schedule to the Rules of Procedure and Conduct of Business in Lok Sabha. They are as follows:

List of Public Undertakings specified in 2019 edition
Part I	Part II	Part III
Public Undertakings established by Central Acts: Damodar Valley Corporation; Life Insurance Corporation of India; Central Warehousing Corporation; Food Corporation of India; Airports Authority of India; National Highways Authority of India	Every Government Company whose annual report is placed before the Houses of Parliament under sub-section (1) of Section 619A of the Companies Act, 1956	Hindustan Aeronautics Ltd; Bharat Electronics Ltd; Mazagon Dock Shipbuilders Ltd; Garden Reach Shipbuilders and Engineers Ltd

== Notable probes (2014-present) ==
=== BSNL Salary ratio (2014) ===
The Committee on Public Undertakings noted in its report: "The staff cost was about ₹ 13,406 crore in 2011-12, that is almost 50 per cent of its revenue, which is abnormally on the higher side as compared to private companies whose expenditure is stated to be in the range of 5-10 per cent."

=== ONGC Videsh Ltd (2014) ===
Based on the performance audit done by C&AG presented in report no. 28 for the year 2010-11, the COPU had the following findings: "Due to unrealistic estimation of reserves/production, OVL has suffered a huge loss of Rs.1182.14 crore during the period 2008-09 and 2009-10. Since OVL did not chose to farm-out part of its stake to a local partner, the entire loss has been borne out by it," Following up in August 2015, COPU stated; "Except reiterating its earlier reply OVL has not offered any justification for its ill-conceived decision not to farm-out part of its stake in IEC to local Russian firms/ entities and its unrealistic estimation of oil reserves and production targets."

== Chairpersons ==
=== Chairpersons of the committee till date ===
Sr. No.	Name	Term of office	Terms	Political party (Alliance)
1	P. Govinda Menon	1964-66	2	INC
2	Dwarka N. Tiwary	1966-67	1	JNP
3	Surindra Nath Dwivedy	1967-68	1	PSP
4	G. S. Dhillon	1968-69	1	INC
5	Mansinhji Rana	1969-72	3	INC
6	Subhadra Joshi	1972-73	1	INC
7	Amrit Nahata	1973	<1	INC
8	Nawal Kishore Sharma	1973-76	3	INC
9	Darbara Singh	1976-77	1	INC
10	Jyotirmoy Basu	1977-79	2	CPI(M)
11	Bapu Kaldate	1979-80	1	JD
12	Bansi Lal	1980-82	2	INC
13	Madhusudan Vairale	1982-85	3	INC
14	Vazhappady K. Ramamurthy	1985-87	2	INC
15	Vakkom Purushothaman	1987-90	3	INC
16	Basudeb Acharia	1990-91	1	CPI(M)
17	A. R. Antulay	1991-93	2	INC
18	Vilas Muttemwar	1993-95	2	INC
19	Kamal Chaudhary	1995-96	1	INC
20	G. Venkatswamy	1996-98	2	INC
21	Manbendra Shah	1998-99	1	BJP
22	Vijay Kumar Malhotra	1999-2004	5	BJP
23	Rupchand Pal	2004-09	5	CPI(M)
24	V. Kishore Chandra Deo	2009-11	2	INC
25	Jagdambika Pal	2011-14	3	INC
26	Shanta Kumar	2014-19	5	BJP
27	Meenakshi Lekhi	2019-21	2	BJP
28	Santosh Gangwar	2021-24	3	BJP
29	Baijayant Panda	2024-incumbent	1	BJP

=== Longest serving chairpersons of COPU ===
Sr. No.	Name	Terms	Years	Party
1	Vijay Kumar Malhotra	5	1999-2004	BJP
2	Rupchand Pal	5	2004-09	CPI(M)
3	Shanta Kumar	5	2014-19	BJP

== Reports ==
Since the inception of the COPU, it has presented 604 reports till date. Of these, 301 are original reports, and 303 are reports on actions taken by the Government in response the original reports made by the COPU. Out of those 301 original reports, 37 are horizontal studies on various aspects of working of the public undertakings.

== See also ==
- 17th Lok Sabha
- Estimates Committee
- Public Accounts Committee (India)
- Standing Committee on Defence (India)
- Standing Committee on Finance (India)
- List of Indian parliamentary committees
