= Sanjay Jaiswal =

Indian politician

Dr. Sanjay Jaiswal
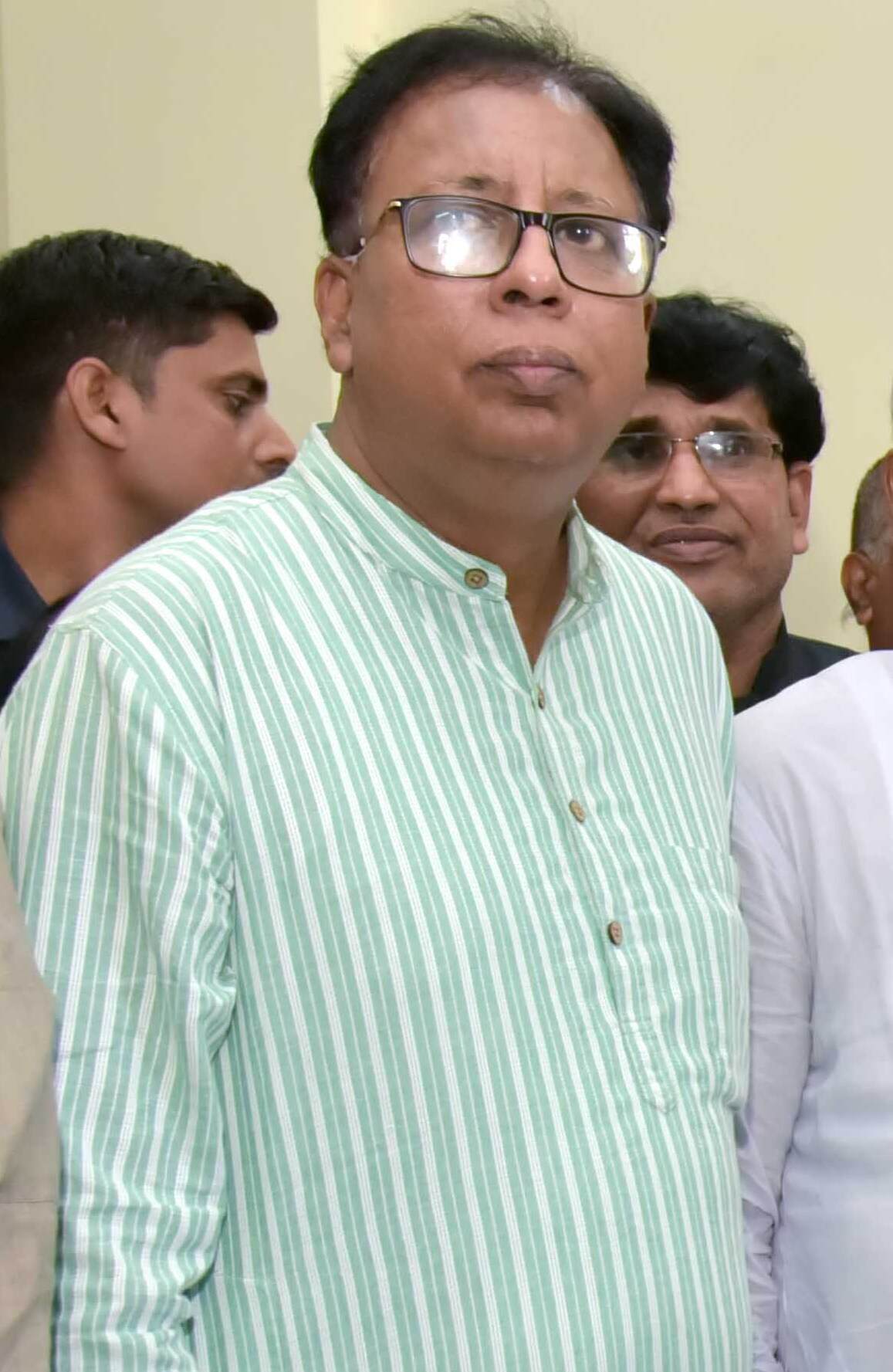

Chief Whip for Bharatiya Janata Party, 18th Lok Sabha
- Incumbent
- Assumed office 27 July 2024
- Prime Minister: Narendra Modi

Member of Parliament, Lok Sabha
- Incumbent
- Assumed office 16 May 2009
- Preceded by: Constituency created
- Constituency: Paschim Champaran

President of Bharatiya Janata Party, Bihar
- In office 14 September 2019 – 23 March 2023
- Preceded by: Nityanand Rai
- Succeeded by: Samrat Chaudhary

Personal details
- Born: 29 November 1965 (age 60) Patna, Bihar, India
- Party: Bharatiya Janata Party
- Spouse: Manju Chaudhary
- Occupation: Politician

Dr. Sanjay Jaiswal (born 29 November 1965) is an Indian politician who has represented Paschim Champaran constituency of Bihar since 2009 as a member of the Bharatiya Janata Party (BJP), winning the seat in 2009, 2014, 2019 and 2024. He served as the party president of the BJP in Bihar from September 2019 to 23 March 2023.

== Early life ==
Jaiswal was born to Madan Prasad Jaiswal (former MP of Bettiah) and Saroj Jaiswal on 29 November 1965 at Betiah, West Champaran, Bihar into a Kalwar family. He completed his M.B.B.S from Patna Medical College and M.D. from Darbhanga Medical College in Darbhanga.

== Career ==
While in office, Jaiswal has been a member of Consultative Committee on Ministry of Information and Broadcasting, the Committee on Health and Family Welfare, and a member of the governing body JIPMER, Pondicherry. Jaiswal is currently the chairman of Estimates Committee.

He is also a member of the Governing Body of AIIMS, Patna and the Central Council of Health and Family Welfare.

== Personal life ==
He is married to Manju Chaudhary and they have one son and one daughter.
