= John Matthai =

Indian politician

Padma Vibhushan John Matthai
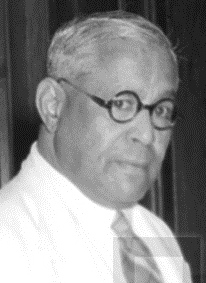
- John Matthai in 1949

1st Chairman of State Bank of India
- In office 1 July 1955 – 30 September 1956
- Prime Minister: Jawaharlal Nehru
- Preceded by: Post established
- Succeeded by: H. V. R. Iengar

Union Minister for Finance
- In office 22 September 1948 – 1 June 1950
- Preceded by: R. K. Shanmukham Chetty
- Succeeded by: C. D. Deshmukh

Union Minister for Railways
- In office 15 August 1947 – 22 September 1948
- Preceded by: Office established
- Succeeded by: N. Gopalaswami Ayyangar

Personal details
- Born: 10 January 1886 Calicut, Madras Presidency, British India (now Kozhikode, Kerala, India)
- Died: February 1959 (aged 73)
- Party: Indian National Congress
- Relatives: Verghese Kurien (nephew)
- Education: University of Madras (Madras Christian College, Madras Law College)

John Matthai CIE (1886–1959) was an Indian economist, bureaucrat, academician and statesman who served as Independent India's first Railway Minister and subsequently as well as India's Finance Minister, taking office shortly after the presentation of India's first Budget, in 1948.

== Biography ==
He was born in Kozhikode, Kerala on January 10, 1886, as the son of Challiyal Thomas Matthai and Anna Thayyil to an Anglican Syrian Christian family. He graduated in economics from the University of Madras. He served as a Professor and Head in University of Madras from 1922 to 1925. He completed his doctoral research at the London School of Economics on village government in British India, and B.Litt. from Balliol College, Oxford. He contributed an article India and the War in the Oxford series ‘Papers for War Time’. He then spent a year studying the cooperative movement in Ireland under agricultural reformer Sir Horace Plunkett before returning to India.

He presented two Budgets as India's Finance Minister, but resigned following the 1950 Budget in protest against the increasing power of the Planning Commission and P. C. Mahalanobis. He was the first Chairman of the State Bank of India when it was set up in 1955. He was the founding President of the Governing Body of the National Council of Applied Economic Research (NCAER) in New Delhi, India's first independent economic policy institute established in 1956. He served as the Vice Chancellor of the University of Mumbai from 1955 till 1957 and then as the first Vice Chancellor of the University of Kerala from 1957 to 1959. His nephew, Verghese Kurien, is generally recognized as the architect of India's White Revolution. Dr. John Matthai Centre, Thrissur, located on the large plot of land donated by his family, is named in his honour. His wife, Achamma Matthai was an Indian social worker and a women's rights activist. The Government of India honoured him in 1954 with the award of Padma Shri, the fourth highest Indian civilian award, for his contributions to the society.

John Matthai was invested as a Companion of the Order of the Indian Empire (CIE) in 1934, and was awarded the Padma Vibhushan in 1959. NCAER, led by the President of its Governing Body, Nandan Nilekani and with support from the Nilekani Philanthropies, honoured John Matthai in 2019 by naming NCAER's new office building at its campus in New Delhi as the John Matthai Tower.

Preceded by R. K. Shanmukham Chetty	Finance Minister of India; 1949–1951	Succeeded by Chintamanrao Deshmukh
