= Ministry of finance =

Government department responsible for financial policies

A ministry of finance is a ministry or other government agency in charge of government finance, fiscal policy, and financial regulation. It is headed by a finance minister, an executive or cabinet position.

A ministry of finance's portfolio has a large variety of names around the world, such as "treasury", "finance", "financial affairs", "economy" or "economic affairs". The position of the finance minister might be named for this portfolio, but it may also have some other name, like "Treasurer" or, in the United Kingdom, "Chancellor of the Exchequer".

The duties of a finance minister differ between countries. Typically, they encompass one or more of government finances, economic policy and/or financial regulation, but there are significant differences between countries and across political systems:

- in some countries the finance minister might also have oversight of monetary policy (while in other countries that is the responsibility of an independent central bank);
- in some countries the finance minister might be assisted by one or more other ministers (some supported by a separate government department) with respect to fiscal policy or budget formation;
- in many countries there is a separate portfolio for general economic policy in the form of a ministry of "economic affairs" or "national economy" or "commerce";
- in many countries financial regulation is handled by a separate agency, which might be overseen by the finance ministry or some other government body.

Finance ministers are also often found in governments of federated states or provinces of a federal country. In these cases their powers may be substantially limited by superior legislative or fiscal policy, notably the control of taxation, spending, currency, inter-bank interest rates and the money supply.

The powers of a finance minister vary between governments. In the United States, the finance minister is called the "Secretary of the Treasury", though there is a separate and subordinate Treasurer of the United States, and it is the director of the Office of Management and Budget who drafts the budget.

In the United Kingdom, the equivalent of the finance minister is the Chancellor of the Exchequer. Due to a quirk of history, the Chancellor of the Exchequer is also styled Second Lord of the Treasury with the Prime Minister also holding the historic position of First Lord of the Treasury. This signals the Prime Minister's seniority and superior responsibility over the Treasury.

In Australia, the senior minister is the Treasurer, although there is a Minister for Finance who is more junior and, as of 2018, heads a separate portfolio of Finance and the Public Service.

Finance ministers can be unpopular if they must raise taxes or cut spending. Finance ministers whose key decisions had directly benefited both the performance and perception of their country's economic and financial achievements are recognised by the annual Euromoney Finance Minister of the Year award.

== Lists of current ministries of finance ==
=== Named "ministry" ===
- Ministry of Finance (Afghanistan)
- Ministry of Finance and Economy (Albania)
- Ministry of Finance (Algeria)
- Ministry of Finance (Andorra)
- Ministry of Finance (Angola)
- Ministry of Finance (Antigua and Barbuda)
- Ministry of the Treasury (Argentina)
- Ministry of Finance (Armenia)
- Ministry of Finance (Austria)
- Ministry of Finance (Azerbaijan)
- Ministry of Finance (The Bahamas)
- Ministry of Finance (Bahrain)
- Ministry of Finance (Bangladesh)
- Ministry of Finance, Economic Affairs and Investment (Barbados)
- Ministry of Finance (Bashkortostan)
- Ministry of Finance (Belarus)
- Ministry of Finance (Belize)
- Ministry of Economy and Finance (Benin)
- Ministry of Finance (Bhutan)
- Ministry of Economy and Public Finance (Bolivia)
- Ministry of Finance and Treasury (Bosnia and Herzegovina)
- Ministry of Finance and Economic Development (Botswana)
- Ministry of the Economy (Brazil)
- Ministry of Finance and Economy (Brunei)
- Ministry of Finance (Bulgaria)
- Ministry of Economy and Finance (Cambodia)
- Ministry of Finance (Cameroon)
- Ministry of Finance (Chile)
- Ministry of Finance (China)
- Ministry of Finance and Public Credit (Colombia)
- Ministry of Finance (Costa Rica)
- Ministry of Finance (Croatia)
- Ministry of Finance and Prices (Cuba)
- Ministry of Finance (Czech Republic)
- Ministry of Finance (Denmark)
- Ministry of Economy and Finance (Djibouti)
- Ministry of Finance (Dominica)
- Ministry of Finance (Dominican Republic)
- Ministry of Finance (East Timor)
- Ministry of Economy and Finance (Ecuador)
- Ministry of Finance (Egypt)
- Ministry of Finance (El Salvador)
- Ministry of Finance (Eritrea)
- Ministry of Finance (Estonia)
- Ministry of Finance and Economic Development (Ethiopia)
- Ministry of Finance (Finland)
- Ministry of Economics and Finance (France)
- Ministry of Finance of Georgia
- Federal Ministry of Finance (Germany)
- Ministry of Finance and Economic Planning (Ghana)
- Ministry of National Economy and Finance (Greece)
- Ministry of Finance (Grenada)
- Ministry of Public Finance (Guatemala)
- Ministry of Economy and Finance (Guinea)
- Ministry of Finance (Guyana)
- Ministry of Economy and Finance (Haiti)
- Ministry of Finance (Honduras)
- Ministry of Finance (Hungary)
- Ministry of Finance (Iceland)
- Ministry of Finance (India)
- Ministry of Finance (Indonesia)
- Ministry of Economic Affairs and Finance (Iran)
- Ministry of Finance (Iraq)
- Ministry of Finance (Israel)
- Ministry of Economy and Finance (Italy)
- Ministry of Finance and the Public Service (Jamaica)
- Ministry of Finance (Japan)
- Ministry of Finance (Jordan)
- Ministry of Finance (Kenya)
- Ministry of Finance (Kazakhstan)
- Ministry of Finance and Economic Development (Kiribati)
- Ministry of Finance (Kosovo)
- Ministry of Finance (Kuwait)
- Ministry of Economy and Finance (Kyrgyzstan)
- Ministry of Finance (Laos)
- Ministry of Finance (Lebanon)
- Ministry of Finance (Lesotho)
- Ministry of Finance (Liberia)
- Ministry of Finance (Libya)
- Ministry of Finance (Lithuania)
- Ministry of Finance (Malaysia)
- Ministry of Finance (Maldives)
- Ministry of Finance (Marshall Islands)
- Ministry of Finance (Mauritania)
- Ministry of Finance and Economic Development (Mauritius)
- Ministry of Finance (Moldova)
- Ministry of Finance (Mongolia)
- Ministry of Finance (Montenegro)
- Ministry of Economy and Finance (Morocco)
- Ministry of Finance and Planning (Myanmar)
- Ministry of Finance (Namibia)
- Ministry of Finance (Nepal)
- Ministry of Finance (Netherlands)
- Ministry of Finance (Niger)
- Federal Ministry of Finance (Nigeria)
- Ministry of Finance of Northern Cyprus
- Ministry of Finance (North Korea)
- Ministry of Finance (North Macedonia)
- Ministry of Finance (Norway)
- Ministry of Finance (Oman)
- Ministry of Finance (Ontario)
- Ministry of Finance and Revenue (Pakistan)
- Ministry of Finance (Palau)
- Ministry of Finance (Palestine)
- Ministry of Finance (Papua New Guinea)
- Ministry of Economy and Finance (Peru)
- Ministry of Finance (Poland)
- Ministry of Finance (Portugal)
- Ministry of Finance (Puntland)
- Ministry of Finance (Qatar)
- Ministry of Finance (Quebec)
- Rivers State Ministry of Finance
- Ministry of Public Finance (Romania)
- Ministry of Finance (Russia)
- Ministry of Finance and Economic Planning (Rwanda)
- Ministry of Finance and Planning (São Tomé and Príncipe)
- Ministry of Finance (Saskatchewan)
- Ministry of Finance (Saudi Arabia)
- Ministry of Finance (Serbia)
- Sierra Leone Ministry of Finance
- Ministry of Finance (Singapore)
- Ministry of Finance and Treasury (Solomon Islands)
- Ministry of Finance (Somalia)
- Ministry of Economy and Finance (South Korea)
- Ministry of Finance and Economic Planning (South Sudan)
- Ministry of Economy and Enterprise (Spain)
- Ministry of the Treasury (Spain)
- Ministry of Finance (Sri Lanka)
- Ministry of Finance (St. Lucia)
- Ministry of Finance (St. Kitts and Nevis)
- Ministry of Finance (St. Vincent and the Grenadines)
- Ministry of Finance (Sudan)
- Ministry of Finance (Suriname)
- Ministry of Finance (Sweden)
- Ministry of Finance (Syria)
- Ministry of Finance (Tajikistan)
- Ministry of Finance (Taiwan)
- Ministry of Finance and Economic Affairs (Tanzania)
- Ministry of Finance (Thailand)
- Ministry of Finance (Trinidad and Tobago)
- Ministry of Finance (Tunisia)
- Ministry of Finance and Treasury (Turkey)
- Ministry of Finance (Turkmenistan)
- Ministry of Finance, Planning and Economic Development (Uganda)
- Ministry of Finance (United Arab Emirates)
- Ministry of Finance (Ukraine)
- Ministry of Economy and Finance (Uruguay)
- Ministry of Finance (Uzbekistan)
- Ministry of Finance and Economic Management (Vanuatu)
- Ministry of Economy and Finance (Venezuela)
- Ministry of Finance (Vietnam)
- Ministry of Finance (Yemen)
- Ministry of Finance (Zambia)
- Ministry of Finance (Zimbabwe)

=== Named "department" ===
- Department of the Treasury (Australia)
- Department of Finance (Australia)
- Department of Finance (Canada)
- Department of Finance (Ireland)
- Department of Public Expenditure, Infrastructure, Public Service Reform and Digitalisation (Ireland)
- Department of Finance (Kerala, India)
- Department of Finance (Jharkhand, India)
- Department of Finance (Tamil Nadu, India)
- Department of Finance and Administration (Micronesia)
- Department of Finance and Economy (Monaco)
- Department of Finance (Nauru)
- Department of Finance (New Brunswick)
- Department of Finance, Services and Innovation (New South Wales)
- Department of Finance (Northern Ireland)
- Department of Finance (Philippines)
- Department of Budget and Management (Philippines)
- Federal Department of Finance (Switzerland)
- Department of the Treasury (United States)
- Department of Treasury and Finance (South Australia)
- Department of Treasury and Finance (Victoria)
- Department of Finance (Western Australia)

=== Other names ===
- Federal Public Service Finance (Belgium)
- European Commissioner for Economic and Financial Affairs (European Union)
- Financial Services and the Treasury Bureau (Hong Kong)
- Isle of Man Treasury
- Secretariat for Economy and Finance (Macau)
- Secretariat of Finance and Public Credit (Mexico)
- New Zealand Treasury
- Finance Directorates (Scotland)
- National Treasury (South Africa)
- HM Treasury (United Kingdom)
- Administration of the Patrimony of the Apostolic See

== Historical ==
=== Named "ministry" ===
- Ministry of Revenue (imperial China)
- Ministry of Public Action and Accounts (France)
- Federal Ministry of the Treasury (Germany)
- Ministry of Finance (Hawaii)
- Ministry of the Treasury (Japan)
- Ministry of Revenue (Ontario)
- Ministry of Finance (Ottoman Empire)
- Ministry of State Treasury (Poland)
- Ministry of Finance (RSFSR)
- Ministry of Finance of the Russian Empire
- Ministry of Finance (Soviet Union)
- Ministry of Revenues and Duties (Ukraine)
- Ministry of Finance (Yugoslavia)

=== Named "department" ===
- Department of Finance (1976–97) (Australia)
- Department of Finance and Administration (Australia)
- Department of Finance and Deregulation (Australia)

== Lists ==
- List of current finance ministers
- List of female finance ministers

== See also ==
- Board of Finance (disambiguation)
- Ministry of Revenue (disambiguation)
- Committee on Finance (disambiguation)
