= Rashtriya Barh Ayog =

Rashtriya Barh Ayog or the National Flood Commission (NFC) was set up by the Ministry of Agriculture and Irrigation of India in 1976. to study India's flood-control measures. This was done after the projects launched under the National Flood Control Program of 1954 failed to achieve much success. RBA or NFC is responsible for flood control problems in the country and draws out a national plan fixing priorities for implementation in the future. Though the RBA report was submitted in 1980 and accepted by Government, not much progress was reported around the implementation of its recommendations. The report stated, “It is clear that while the maximum area flooded in any one year may broadly indicate the degree of the flood problem in a state, it does not strictly indicate the area liable to floods as different areas may be flooded in different years". The NFC estimated that the total area vulnerable to floods in 1980 was around 40 million hectares. In 1980, the National Flood Commission made 207 recommendations and four broad observations. They are stated below

- There was no increase in rainfall in India and, thus, the increase in floods was due to anthropogenic factors such as deforestation, drainage congestion, and badly planned development works.
- RBA questioned the effectiveness of the methods adopted to control floods, such as embankments and reservoirs, and suggested that the construction of these structures be halted till their efficacy was assessed.
- There have to be consolidated efforts among the states and the Centre to take up research and policy initiatives to control floods.
- RBA recommended a dynamic strategy to cope with the changing nature of floods.

The state's embankments walls to hold river water from spilling were built according to recommendations made in 1954 by the Rashtriya Barh Ayog. According to RBA estimates nearly 80% of India's Flood-prone area could be provided with a reasonable degree of protection.
