= Public Accounts Committee (India) =

Parliamentary committee

Financial Standing Committee
- 18th Lok Sabha
- Founded: 1921; 105 years ago (pre-independence); 1950; 76 years ago (post-independence)
- Country: India

Leadership
- Chairperson: K. C. Venugopal
- Chairperson party: Indian National Congress
- Appointer: Lok Sabha Speaker

Structure
- Seats: 22; Lok Sabha : 15; Rajya Sabha : 7
- Political Parties: BJP (10) INC (4); SP (1); TDP (1); DMK (2); TMC (2); JSP (1) NCP (1)
- Election criteria: The members are elected every year from amongst its members of respective houses according to the principle of proportional representation.
- Tenure: 1 Year

Jurisdiction
- Purpose: Auditing the revenue and the expenditure of the Government of India; Examine the audit report of Comptroller and Auditor General (C&AG)

Sub-committees
- Non Compliance in timely submission of Action Taken Notes(ATN) on the non-selected audit paragraphs & excess expenditure; Direct and Indirect Taxes; Implementation of Recommendations of PAC; Railways

Rules & Procedure
- Rules of Procedure and Conduct of Business in Lok Sabha 2014
- Applicable rules: Rule 308 & 309 (page 112 - 113)

The Public Accounts Committee (PAC) is a committee of selected members of parliament, constituted by the Parliament of India, for the purpose of auditing the revenue and the expenditure of the Government of India. They check that parliament exercises over the executive stems from the basic principle that parliament embodies the will of the people. This committee along with the Estimates committee (EC) and Committee on Public Undertakings (COPU) are the three financial standing committees of the Parliament of India.

It serves as a check on the government especially with respect to its expenditure bill and its primary function is to examine the audit report of Comptroller and Auditor General (C&AG) after it is laid in the Parliament. C&AG assists the committee during the course of investigation. None of its members are allowed to be ministers in the government. The main function of the committee is to ascertain whether the money granted by parliament has been spent by government within the scope of the demand.

The Public Accounts Committee consists of not more than twenty-two members, fifteen elected by Lok Sabha, the lower house of the Parliament, and not more than seven members of Rajya Sabha, the upper house of the Parliament. The members are elected every year from amongst its members of respective houses according to the principle of proportional representation by means of single transferable vote. The chairperson is appointed by the Lok Sabha speaker. The term of office of the members is one year.

At present, the 18th Lok Sabha has Rahul Gandhi as leader of opposition, and Indian National Congress (INC) being largest opposition party has the responsibility of heading the PAC. The current PAC is headed by K.C. Venugopal since August, 2024 after Adhir Ranjan Chowdhury, who was the leader of INC in the Lok Sabha.

== History ==
The committee was first conceived in the year 1921 in the wake of Montagu-Chelmsford Reforms. During the initial days of British colonial government in India, the finance member of the executive council was the chairperson of the committee.

Post independence, until 1950 the chairperson of the committee was the finance minister. However, in 1950, the country became republic and the committee became a parliamentary committee functioning under the control of the Speaker of Lok Sabha with a non-official chairperson. From 1950 to 1967, the chairperson was selected from the ruling party. Since 1967, the chairperson of the committee is selected from the opposition, usually the leader of opposition.

Prior to the year 1954–55, the committee consisted of 15 members who were elected by Lok Sabha from amongst its members. But with effect from the year 1954–55, 7 members from the Rajya Sabha have also been elected to the committee.

== Scope and working ==
As stated earlier, the primary function of the PAC is to examine the audit report of Comptroller and Auditor General (C&AG) after it is laid in the Parliament. The audit by the C&AG is comprehensive and manifold. It involves among others, (a) accountancy audit, (b) regularity audit, (c) appropriation audit, (d) discretionary audit and (e) efficiency-cum-performance audit.

At the beginning of its term every year, the committee makes a selection of audit paragraphs included in the various reports of C&AG for in-depth examination. After holding deliberations and taking note of the time available at its disposal, the committee selects the most important paragraphs from the audit reports for detailed examination and submits its reports to the House on them.

== Current composition ==
Keys: BJP (10) INC (4) SP (1) TDP (1) DMK (2) TMC (2) JSP (1) NCP (1) = 22 members

Party-wise membership of Public Accounts Committee
1. BJP (45.5%)
2. INC (18.2%)
3. DMK (9.09%)
4. TMC (9.09%)
5. TDP (4.54%)
6. SP (4.54%)
7. JSP (4.54%)
8. NCP (4.54%)

Members from 18th Lok Sabha; tenure – August 24-29
Sr. No.	Portrait	Name	Constituency, state	Party
1		K. C. Venugopal (Chairman)	Alappuzha, Kerala	INC
2		Jai Parkash	Hisar, Haryana	INC
3		Dr. Amar Singh	Fatehgarh Sahib, Punjab	INC
4		Ravi Shankar Prasad	Patna Sahib, Bihar	BJP
5		Jagdambika Pal	Domariyaganj, Uttar Pradesh	BJP
6		Aparajita Sarangi	Bhubaneshwar, Odisha	BJP
7		Anurag Singh Thakur	Hamirpur, Himachal Pradesh	BJP
8		Tejasvi Surya	Bangalore South, Karnataka	BJP
9		Nishikant Dubey	Godda, Jharkhand	BJP
10		C. M. Ramesh	Anakapalle, Andhra Pradesh	BJP
11		T. R. Baalu	Sriperumbudur, Tamil Nadu	DMK
12		Magunta Sreenivasulu Reddy	Ongole, Andhra Pradesh	TDP
13		Dharmendra Yadav	Azamgarh, Uttar Pradesh	SP
14		Balashowry Vallabhaneni	Machilipatnam, Andhra Pradesh	JSP
15		Prof. Sougata Roy	Dum Dum, West Bengal	TMC
Notes

Members from the Rajya Sabha
Sr. No.	Name	State Legislature	Party
1	Shaktisinh Gohil	Gujarat	INC
2	Ashok Chavan	Maharashtra	BJP
3	Sudhanshu Trivedi	Uttar Pradesh	BJP
4	Dr. K. Laxman	Uttar Pradesh	BJP
5	Sukhendu Sekhar Ray	West Bengal	TMC
6	Praful Patel	Maharashtra	NCP
7	Tiruchi N. Siva	Tamil Nadu	DMK

=== Sub-committees ===
Currently there are 4 sub-committees within the PAC. They are as follows.

Sub-Committees of Public Accounts Committee India
Sr. No.	Sub-committee	Date constituted	Convenor	Alternate convenor
1	Sub-Committee – I (Non Compliance in Timely submission of Action Taken Notes on the Non-selected Audit Paragraphs & Excess Expenditure)	16 August 2021	Shaktisinh Gohil	
2	Sub-Committee - II (Direct and Indirect Taxes)	26 July 2018	Shivkumar Chanabasappa Udasi	Rajeev Gowda
3	Sub-Committee – III (Implementation of Recommendations of PAC)	26 July 2018	Bhartruhari Mahtab	Subhash Chandra Baheria
4	Sub-Committee – IV (Railways)	26 July 2018	Sukhendu Sekhar Roy	Ponnusamy Venugopal

== Probes in recent years ==
The C&AG report on the 2G spectrum case stated a loss of ₹1.76 trillion (US$25 billion), based on 2010 3G and BWA spectrum-auction prices. The ensuing differences resulting from the then opposition party BJP's demand to set up a joint parliamentary committee in addition to the PAC's inquiry into the 2G spectrum allocation case led to a complete freeze between the government and opposition in the winter session of parliament of 2010. The then PM Manmohan Singh stated that he was willing to appear before the committee. This brought the committee to the forefront of the public's attention. Some of the probes since then are listed below :

=== 2G spectrum case (2008) ===
The Comptroller and Auditor General (C&AG) laid out in its report a seething inquest of the case, showing how then telecom minister A Raja and bureaucrats allegedly colluded to show undue favour to companies that lied or misrepresented basic information in their applications for 2G licenses. The C&AG report on the 2G spectrum case stated a loss of ₹1.76 trillion (US$25 billion). The initial estimate of loss was 57,000 crores but was revised upward of 1.76 lakh crores. The committee, on 4 April 2011, summoned Ratan Tata, chairman of the Tata group; and Niira Radia, a corporate lobbyist, regarding the case. The then PAC chairperson Murli Manohar Joshi asked Congress members to apologise to Comptroller and Auditor General of India for making allegations against it.

=== Commonwealth Games case (2010) ===
The 2010 Commonwealth Games hosted by India was subject of multiple allegations of corruption. The Public Accounts Committee has faulted the then Congress-led UPA government for taking the games management out of the government machinery leading to a "number of errors" that almost resulted in the "biggest management failure". The report was tabled in Parliament in April 2017.

=== Adarsh housing case (2011) ===
In 2011, a report of the Comptroller and Auditor General of India (C&AG) said, "The episode of Adarsh Co-operative Housing Society reveals how a group of select officials, placed in key posts, could subvert rules and regulations in order to grab prime government land – a public property – for personal benefit."

=== Coal block allocation case (2012) ===
The C&AG in its report estimated undue benefits to the tune ₹1.86 trillion (US$26 billion) to private players on account of coal blocks allocation to them without resorting to auction. The essence of the C&AG's argument is that the Government had the authority to allocate coal blocks by a process of competitive bidding, but chose not to. As a result, both public sector enterprises (PSEs) and private firms paid less than they might have otherwise.

=== VVIP Helicopter acquisition case (2013) ===
Chairperson K V Thomas said in 2016 that the PAC was willing to take up the VVIP case again, although PAC, when it was headed by his predecessor and senior BJP leader Murli Manohar Joshi, had examined the report of the Comptroller and Auditor General (CAG) in 2013.

=== Demonetisation of November 8, 2016 ===
On the eve of November 8, 2016, Prime Minister of India, Narendra Modi announced "Notes of ₹500 (US$5.20) and ₹1,000 (US$10) will not remain a legal tender by midnight". Being an unprecedented step it was much highlighted in the national and international news with a number of people criticizing the move and government acclaiming it as a surgical strike against black money. But then PAC head K. V. Thomas, member of INC, took a serious note of the move and started probing the move wherein it decided to call RBI governor Urjit Patel, Finance Secretary Ashok Lavasa and Economic Affairs Secretary Shaktikanta Das. The decision was taken unanimously by all the members of the committee to call the bureaucratic officers.

== Chairpersons ==
=== Pre-independence ===
Sr. No.	Name	Term of office	No. of Terms
1	W. M. Hailey	1922	1
2	Sir Basil P. Blackett	1922–27	6
3	Sir Bhupendra Nath Mitra	1928	1
4	Sir George Schuster	1929–31	3
5	Sir Alan Parson	1932	1
6	A. H. Lloyd	1933	1
7	Sir James Grigg	1934–36	3
8	J. C. Nixon	1937	1
9	Sir James Grigg*	1938	1
10	Sir Jeremy Raisman	1939–41	3
11	C. E. Jones	1942	1
12	Sir Jeremy Raisman*	1943	1
12	Sir Cyril Jones	1944	1
13	Sir Archibald Rowlands	1945	1
14	Sir Eric Coates	1946	Last pre-independence committee
15	John Mathai	1946	Last pre-independence committee
16	Liaquat Ali Khan	1946	Last pre-independence committee

* Served second non-consecutive terms

=== Post Independence ===
Sr. No.	Portrait	Name	Term of office	Terms	Political party (Alliance)
1		R. K. Shanmukham Chetty	1947–48	1	INC
2		John Mathai	1948–49	1	INC
3		B. Das	1950–55	5	INC
4		V. B. Gandhi	1955–57	2	INC
5		T. N. Singh	1957–58	1	INC
6		N. G. Ranga	1958–59	1	INC
7		P. Subbarayan	1959–60	1	INC
8		Upendranath Barman	1960–61	1	INC
9		C. R. Pattabhiraman	1961–62	1	INC
10		Mahavir Tyagi	1962–63	1	INC
11		R. K. Khadilkar	1963–64	1	INC
12		R. R. Morarka	1964–67	1	INC
13		Minoo Masani ^{†}	1967–69 ^{†}	2	Swatantra
14		Atal Bihari Vajpayee	1969–71	2	BJS
15		Era Sezhiyan	1971–73	2	DMK
16		Jyotirmoy Basu	1973–75	2	CPI(M)
17		Hirendranath Mukherjee	1975–77	2	CPI
18		C. M. Stephen	1977–78	1	INC
19		P. V. Narasimha Rao	1978–79	1	INC
20		T. A. Pai	1979–80*	partial	INC
21		R. Venkataraman	1979–80*	partial	INC
22		Chandrajit Yadav	1980–81	1	JNP(S)
23		Satish Chandra Agarwal	1981–83	2	BJP
24		Sunil Maitra	1983–85	2	CPI(M)
25		E. Ayyapu Reddy	1985–87	2	TDP
26		Amal Dutta	1987–89	2	CPI(M)
27		P. Kolandaivelu	1989*	partial	AIDMK
28		Santosh Mohan Dev	1990–91	1	INC
29		Atal Bihari Vajpayee	1991–93	2	BJP
30		Bhagwan Shankar Rawat	1993–95	2	BJP
31		Ram Naik	1995–96	1	BJP
32		Murli Manohar Joshi	1996–98	2	BJP
33		Manoranjan Bhakta	1998–99	1	INC
34		N. D. Tiwari	1999–2002*	2 partial	INC
34		N. Janardhana Reddy	2002*	partial	INC
35		Buta Singh	2002–04	2	INC
36		Vijay Kumar Malhotra	2004–09*	4 partial	BJP
37		Santosh Gangwar	2009*	partial	BJP
38		Jaswant Singh	2009–10	partial	BJP
39		Gopinath Munde	2010	partial	BJP
40		Murli Manohar Joshi	2010–14	4	BJP
41		K V Thomas	2014–16	2	INC
42		Mallikarjun Kharge	2016–2019	2	INC
43		Adhir Ranjan Chowdhury	2019-2024	5	INC
44		K.C. Venugopal	2024 - incumbent		INC

^{†} Denotes the year 1967–68 from when the chairman of the PAC was member of the main opposition party, usually the leader of opposition.

=== Longest serving chairpersons of PAC ===
Longest Serving Chairmen of PAC - Post Independence
Sr. No.	Name	Terms	Years	Party
1	Murli Manohar Joshi	6	1996–98, 2010–2014	BJP
2	B. Das	5	1950–55	INC
3	Atal Bihari Vajpayee	4	1969–71, 1991–93	BJP

== Reports Published ==
As part of its oversight process the committee has published quite a number of reports over the course of its existence post declaration of republic in 1950. The committee has published a total of 1596 reports from 1950 to April 2018.

1596 Reports published until April 2018
Lok Sabha	Tenure	Reports Presented
1st Lok Sabha	1952–57	25
2nd Lok Sabha	1957–62	43
3rd Lok Sabha	1962–67	72
4th Lok Sabha	1967–70	125
5th Lok Sabha	1971–77	239
6th Lok Sabha	1977–79	149
7th Lok Sabha	1980–84	231
8th Lok Sabha	1984–89	187
9th Lok Sabha	1989–91	22
10th Lok Sabha	1991–96	119
11th Lok Sabha	1996–97	24
12th Lok Sabha	1998–99	11
13th Lok Sabha	1999–04	63
14th Lok Sabha	2004–09	84
15th Lok Sabha	2009–14	100
16th Lok Sabha	2014–2019	102

== See also ==
- 17th Lok Sabha
- Committee on Public Undertakings
- Estimates Committee
- Standing Committee on Defence (India)
- Standing Committee on Finance
- List of Indian parliamentary committees
