= Board of Finance (New England) =

The Board of Finance, also known as the Budget Committee, Finance Committee, Ways and Means Committee, Appropriations Committee, Advisory Committee or Warrant Committee, is a body that reviews local government budgets in towns or school districts that use the town meeting form of government. Whether the board is appointed or elected, and whether it is merely advisory or has authority over the budget, depends on state and local laws.

Its role is to act as a balance against the select board or school board, which usually set the budget and present it to the public at town meeting. Typically the Board of Finance is seen as being more cost-conscious than the governing body - that is, it prefers smaller budgets.

In many towns, the budget is split between general government, administered by the select board and the school district administered by the board of education. The school district include one town or several towns, which join into a "regional" (Connecticut, Massachusetts, New Hampshire) or "unified" (Vermont) school district. School districts in New England do not have separate taxation powers, and must receive their revenues from member towns.

Typically, after the select board or school board settle their respective budgets, they are submitted to the Board of Finance for review. The Board of Finance may return the budget to the respective bodies with requests for changes, or may refer it to the town meeting for approval. In some cases, the Board of Finance may establish the budget itself, leaving the Selectmen or School Board to comment.

Outside the budget process, the Board of Finance may perform financial oversight duties on behalf of the town.
