= Sudhanshu Trivedi =

Indian politician (born 1970)

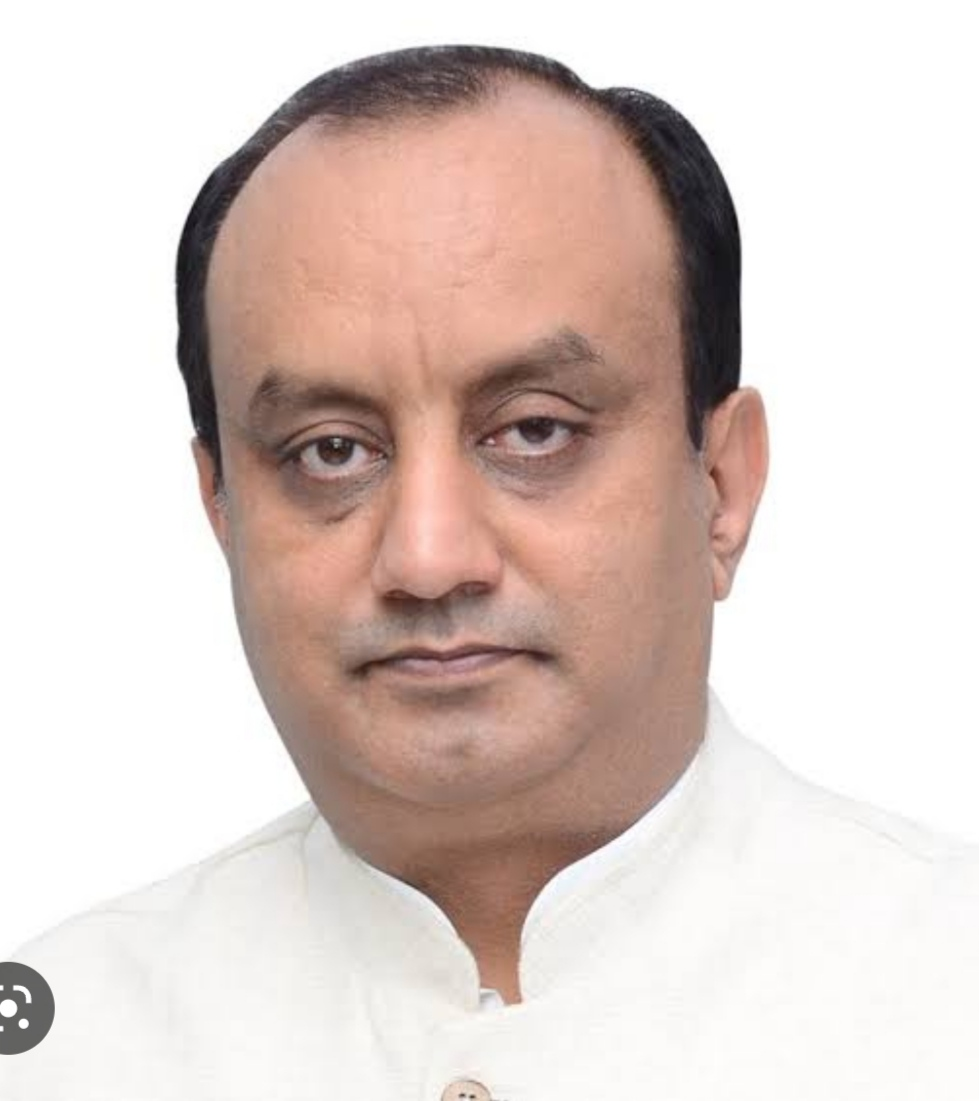

Member of Parliament, Rajya Sabha
- Incumbent
- Assumed office 9 October 2019
- Preceded by: Arun Jaitley
- Constituency: Uttar Pradesh

Personal details
- Born: 20 October 1970 (age 55) Lucknow, Uttar Pradesh, India
- Party: Bharatiya Janata Party
- Spouse: Shalini Tiwari
- Children: 2
- Education: G. B. Pant University of Agriculture and Technology; Dr. A.P.J. Abdul Kalam Technical University

Sudhanshu Trivedi (born 20 October 1970) is an Indian politician and former professor. A leader of the Bharatiya Janata Party and Member of Parliament from its Upper House, the Rajya Sabha since 2019, Trivedi is a senior National Spokesperson of the Bharatiya Janata Party.

== Early life ==
Trivedi was born on 20 October 1970 in Indira Nagar, Lucknow, Uttar Pradesh to U.D. Trivedi and Priyamvada Trivedi. He studied Engineering and holds a Ph.D. in Mechanical Engineering from Dr. A.P.J. Abdul Kalam Technical University (previously U.P. Technical University), Lucknow, Uttar Pradesh.

== Career ==
Trivedi was a faculty member at the Mechanical Engineering department of many universities including the Mahatma Gandhi Chitrakoot Gramoday Vishwavidyalaya. He worked as an information advisor to the former Chief Minister of Uttar Pradesh and as political advisor to the former BJP National President Rajnath Singh. During the 2014 Indian General Elections, he was one of the members of the BJP's media team. As of 2016, he is the national spokesperson of the BJP.

Trivedi was elected unopposed to the Rajya Sabha in the October 2019 by-election from Uttar Pradesh. The seat had fallen vacant after the demise of former Union Minister Arun Jaitley.

== Personal life ==
Trivedi lives at Pandara Road, New Delhi. He is married to Shalini Tiwari on 8 May 2009 and has a son and a daughter.
