= Kamal Chaudhry =

Indian politician (1947–2024)

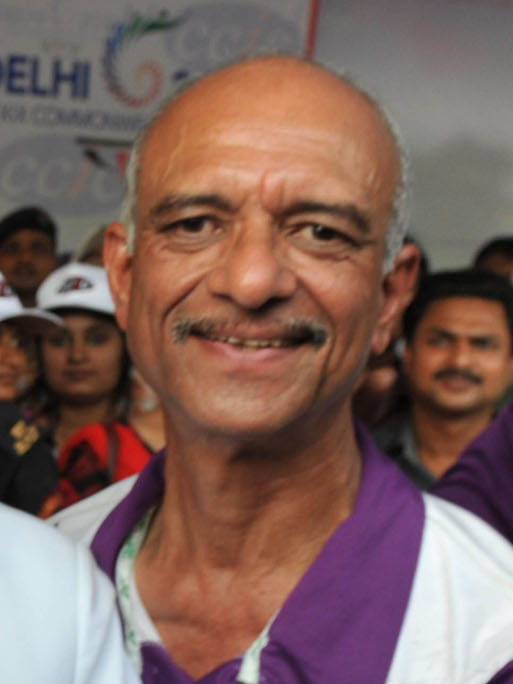
- Chaudhry in 2020

Member of Parliament, Lok Sabha
- In office 1984–1996
- Preceded by: Giani Zail Singh
- Succeeded by: Kanshi Ram
- In office 1998–1999
- Preceded by: Kanshi Ram
- Succeeded by: Charanjit Singh Channi
- Constituency: Hoshiarpur, Punjab

Personal details
- Born: 3 July 1947 Hoshiarpur, Punjab Province, British India
- Died: 25 June 2024 (aged 76) Delhi, India
- Party: Bharatiya Janata Party
- Other political affiliations: Indian National Congress, Shiromani Akali Dal ,
- Spouse: Sudha Chaudhry
- Children: 2

Kamal Chaudhry (3 July 1947 – 25 June 2024) was an Indian politician and a fighter pilot from the Indian Air Force. He was a Member of Parliament representing Hoshiarpur district of Punjab in the Lok Sabha for four terms. He was also Chairman of the Standing Committee on Defence and Chairman of the Public Undertaking Committee.

== Early life and education ==
Chaudhry was born in Hoshiarpur, a month before India gained independence, to Ch. Balbir Singh, a freedom fighter and a highly respected Indian politician. His father, fondly referred to as Sher-e Punjab, was a prominent political and social figure who also served as Member of Parliament and MLA from Hoshiarpur on multiple occasions. His mother was a homemaker. After his schooling, he joined the National Defence Academy on 1 December 1967 and went on to become a fighter pilot in the Indian Air Force. He was commissioned on 21 June 1969. In 1982, he was part of the IAF team which was sent to the USSR to bring the latest MIG23 fighter aircraft to India.

Following his father's assassination in 1985 by Khalistani terrorists, Kamal resigned from the IAF and joined the Indian National Congress.

== Political career ==
Chaudhry was elected to the Lok Sabha, the lower house of the Parliament of India, in 1985. He was re-elected in 1989, 1992 and in 1998. During his political career he was part of various committees, notable among them being Chairman – Standing Committee on Defence and Chairman Committee on Public Undertaking. While with the Indian National Congress, he was elected Secretary Congress Party in Parliament in 1990–91 and was Chairman All India Ex-Servicemen Congress from 1992 to 1997. He also helped establish the permanent control room in AICC. He left the Congress and joined the Bharatiya Janata Party in 1998.

== Other activities and interests ==
Chaudhry was also a Member of Panjab University Senate from 1987 to 1995 and of Panjab University Syndicate from 1989 to 1991. He remained President of DAV College Managing Committee, Hoshiarpur for 20 years from 1985 to 2005. During the Commonwealth games in 2010, he was the Vice-Chairman of the Queen's Baton Relay.

== Death ==
Chaudhry died after a prolonged illness at home, on 25 June 2024, at the age of 76.
