= Estimates Committee =

Indian parliamentary committee scrutinizing government expenses

Financial Standing Committee
- 18th Lok Sabha
- Founded: 1950; 76 years ago
- Country: India

Leadership
- Chairperson: Sanjay Jaiswal
- Chairperson party: Bharatiya Janata Party
- Appointer: Lok Sabha Speaker

Structure
- Seats: 30; all from Lok Sabha
- Political parties: BJP (16) INC (2); AIADMK (2); AITC (2); TDP (1); BJD (1); SS (1); BRS (1); CPI(M) (1); RJD (1); INLD (1) JDU (1)
- Election criteria: The members are elected every year from amongst its members according to the principle of proportional representation.
- Tenure: 1 year

Jurisdiction
- Purpose: Scrutinizing the functioning of government ministries and departments in terms of expenditure and utilization of funds; Suggest alternative policies in order to bring about efficiency and economy in administration

Sub-committees
- Drought situation in the country pertaining to the Ministry of Agriculture and Farmers Welfare; Education with special reference to the recent development regarding autonomy in Education

Rules and Procedures
- Rules of Procedure and Conduct of Business in Lok Sabha 2014
- Applicable rules: Rule 310,311 & 312 (page 114 - 115)

The Estimates Committee (India) is a committee of selected members of parliament, constituted by the Parliament of India (the Lok Sabha), for the purpose of scrutinising the functioning of government ministries and departments in terms of expenditure and utilisation of funds. It also suggests alternative policies in order to bring about efficiency and economy in administration. It also examines whether the finances are laid out within the limits of the policy implied in the estimates and also to suggest the form in which the estimates shall be presented to Parliament. This committee along with the Public Accounts committee(PAC) and Committee on Public Undertakings (COPU) are the three financial standing committees of the Parliament of India.

The committee consists of thirty members, all elected from Lok Sabha, the lower house of the Parliament of India. The members are elected every year from amongst its members of the Lok Sabha, according to the principle of proportional representation by means of single transferable vote. The chairperson is appointed by the Lok Sabha speaker. The term of office of the members is one year. A minister is not eligible to become a member of the committee or continue to serve after appointment as a minister. There are no members from Rajya Sabha

Currently the committee is headed by Sanjay Jaiswal from the Bharatiya Janata Party.

== History ==
Although the committee existed pre-independence, post independence, it was established following directives by John Mathai. In his speech presenting the budget of 1950–51, Mathai outlined the role that had been envisaged, saying

As you, Sir, announced earlier in the session, we propose to ask the House to set up an Estimates Committee to scrutinize the expenditure of each Department of Government and of the Government as a whole. Personally I am looking forward to the work of the Estimates Committee when it is set up because I think in two directions it is going to exert a healthy influence upon the course of public expenditure. In the first place, the suggestions and criticisms which may be made by the Estimates Committee would, in my judgement, give a useful direction and guidance to the Government in the matter of regulating expenditure. Secondly I think the knowledge that the expenditure of Government and of the various Departments of Government would be examined in detail by an independent authority set up by the House would act as a deterrent to extravagance in public expenditure.

— John Mathai

Initially the membership of the committee was limited to 25 members, however, in 1956, the membership was expanded to 30 members.

== Scope and working ==
The functions of the committee as enshrined in Rule 310 of Rules of Procedure and Conduct of Business in Lok Sabha are:

- To report what economies, improvements in organisation, efficiency or administrative reform, consistent with the policy underlying the estimates may be effected
- To suggest alternative policies in order to bring about efficiency and economy in administration
- To examine whether the money is well laid out within the limits of the policy implied in the estimates
- To suggest the form in which the estimates shall be presented to Parliament.

The committee from time to time selects the estimates pertaining to a ministry or department of the central government or such of the statutory and other bodies of the central government as may seem fit to the committee. The committee also examines matters of special interest which may arise in the course of its work or which are specially referred to it by the house or by the speaker. The committee calls for preliminary materials from the relevant bodies in regard to the subjects selected for examination and also comments from non-officials connected with the subjects for the use of the members of the committee.

The committee does not exercise its functions in relation to such public sector undertakings as are allotted to the Committee on Public Undertakings by the Rules of Procedure and Conduct of Business of Lok Sabha or by the speaker.

== Current composition ==
Keys: BJP (15) INC (5) SP (2) AITC (1) DMK (1) TDP (1) SS (UBT) (1) YSRCP (1) RLD (1) JDS (1) SKM (1) = 30 members

Party-wise membership of Public Accounts Committee
1. INC 16.66 (16.1%)
2. AITC 3.33 (3.22%)
3. SP 6.66 (6.45%)
4. BJP 50 (48.4%)
5. JDS 3.33 (3.22%)
6. SS(UBT) 3.33 (3.22%)
7. YSRCP 3.33 (3.22%)
8. RLD 3.33 (3.22%)
9. DMK 3.33 (3.22%)
10. SKM 3.33 (3.22%)
11. JDU 3.33 (3.22%)
12. TDP 3.33 (3.22%)

30 members from 18th Lok Sabha; tenure – 2024-25
Sr. No.	Portrait	Name	Constituency, state	Party
1		Sanjay Jaiswal	Paschim Champaran, Bihar	BJP
2		Brijmohan Agrawal	Raipur, Chhattisgarh	BJP
3		Pradan Baruah	Lakhimpur, Assam	BJP
4		P. P. Chaudhary	Pali, Rajasthan	BJP
5		Devusinh Chauhan	Kheda, Gujarat	BJP
6		Sangeeta Kumari Singh Deo	Bolangir, Odisha	BJP
7		Sudhir Gupta	Mandsaur, Madhya Pradesh	BJP
8		Manish Jaiswal	Hazaribagh, Jharkhand	BJP
9		Naveen Jindal	Kurukshetra, Haryana	BJP
10		Jugal Kishore Sharma	Jammu, Jammu and Kashmir	BJP
11		P. C. Mohan	Bangalore Central, Karnataka	BJP
12		Bishnu Pada Ray	Andaman and Nicobar Islands	BJP
13		Bhola Singh	Bulandshahr, Uttar Pradesh	BJP
14		Manoj Tiwari	North East Delhi, Delhi	BJP
15		Rajiv Pratap Rudy	Saran, Bihar	BJP
16		Charanjit Singh Channi	Jalandhar, Punjab	INC
17		Deepender Singh Hooda	Rohtak, Haryana	INC
18		M. K. Raghavan	Kozhikode, Kerala	INC
19		Kumari Selja	Sirsa, Haryana	INC
20		V. Vaithilingam	Puducherry	INC
21		Awadhesh Prasad	Faizabad, Uttar Pradesh	SP
22		Iqra Choudhary	Kairana, Uttar Pradesh	SP
23		Kalyan Banerjee	Serampore, West Bengal	AITC
24		Dayanidhi Maran	Chennai Central, Tamil Nadu	DMK
25		B. K. Parthasarathi	Hindupur, Andhra Pradesh	TDP
26		Arvind Ganpat Sawant	Mumbai South, Maharashtra	SS (UBT)
27		Y. S. Avinash Reddy	Kadapa, Andhra Pradesh	YSRCP
28		Rajkumar Sangwan	Baghpat, Uttar Pradesh	RLD
29		M. Mallesh Babu	Kolar, Karnataka	JDS
30		Indra Hang Subba	Sikkim	SKM

=== Sub-committees ===
Currently there are two sub-committees within the estimates committee. They are as follows:

Sub-Committees of Public Accounts Committee India
Sr. No.	Sub-committee	Date constituted	Portrait	Convener	Portrait	Alternate convener
1	Sub-Committee – I Drought situation in the country pertaining to the Ministry of Agriculture and Farmers Welfare	25 June 2018		Sanjay Shamrao Dhotre		Bhagirath Prasad
2	Sub-Committee - II Education with special reference to the recent development regarding autonomy in Education	25 June 2018		Rajesh Pandey		Arvind Ganpat Sawant

== Current subjects of examination ==
By the press release circulated on 17 May 2018, the committee released the subjects that it has selected for examination during the year 2018-19

Subjects selected for examination by the committee for the year 2018-19
Import of Uranium for Nuclear Plants; Subsidising of Fertilizers; Mining Activities and Environment; Budgetary Reforms; Archives - Museums; PNG Network; Public Distribution System; Education; Pradhan Mantri Krishi Sinchai Yojana; Drought situation in the Country; Impact of Mega Projects on Ecology; Botanical Survey of India and Botanical Gardens; Preparedness of Armed Forces – Defence Production and Procurement; Employment Generation and Role of MSME; Promotion of Yoga and Naturopathy; Rural Housing Fund	Amenities/Facilities at Public Places for persons with disabilities and Senior Citizens; Estimates and Functioning of National Highways; Estimates and Policy Aspects of the Department of Space; Estimates and Policy Aspects of the Ministry of Development of North Eastern Region; Estimates and Policy Aspects of the Ministry of Food Processing Industries; Estimates and Policy Aspects of the Ministry of Earth Sciences; Review of Major and Medium Ports 23. Estimates and Review of Tourism Ministry; Management and Protection of Bird Sanctuaries and National Parks; Performance of the National Action Plan for Climate Change (NAPCC); All India Council for Technical Education (AICTE); Minority Affairs	Collection and Utilisation of various kinds of Cess; Formulation of Standards for Edible Oil; Upgradation of Indian Post Offices; Enforcement Directorate and Recovery of Black Money; Swantantrata Sainik Samman Pension Scheme, 1980; Deen Dayal Upadhyay Gram Jyoti Yojna; Need for alternate cropping patterns in drought affected areas in India; Measuring Growth, Employment and Incomes; Review of Imports, Exports and Balance of Payments; Redevelopment Plan of Government Colonies; Review of Functioning of CGHS; Real Estate Regulatory Mechanism; Encroachment of Public Land for Commercial Activities; Electrification of Trains; Review of Infrastructural Projects in various Holy Cities; Land Policy for Non-Agricultural Lands 46. Border Area Development Programme

== Probes in recent years ==
=== Ganga rejuvenation (2016) ===
The committee noted in its May 2016 report that the river Ganga has been declared one of the ten most polluted rivers of the world. The committee outlined the gist of numerous recommendations as

In view of the incalculable damage caused to the "Nirmalta" and "Aviralta" of the river due to continued emptying of untreated sewage and industrial pollutants into the Ganga despite the efforts made under Ganga Action Plan –I&II; excessive use of chemical fertilizers in the Ganga basin leading to disposal of high levels of nitrogen and phosphorus which eventually drains into surface and subsurface water which is part of the Ganga river system and the multiplicity of authorities wanting in synergy, the Committee recommend that an overarching and empowered authority be set up for securing the 'nirmalta' and 'aviralta' and rejuvenation of the Ganga without further delay.

Indian activist G. D. Agrawal died at the age of 86, following a 15-week hunger strike aimed at protesting the state of the Ganges river. He was a former professor of environmental engineering at IIT Kanpur.

=== Banking sector NPAs (2018) ===
The supreme court in 2016 took suo muto cognisance of reports of bad debts asking RBI to share publicly names of all defaulters who owe over ₹500 crore (equivalent to ₹730 crore or US$78 million in 2026), since in 2015 the top ten public sector banks had written off ₹40,000 crore (equivalent to ₹580 billion or US$6.2 billion in 2026). As of December 2017, this toxic debt problem worsened as it touched ₹899,000 crore (equivalent to ₹13 trillion or US$140 billion in 2026) with public sector banks(PSBs) accounting for over 86% of the pie roughly ₹777,000 crore (equivalent to ₹11 trillion or US$120 billion in 2026) In September 2018, the Joshi led committee sent notices to the coal and power ministries asking for explanations on mounting NPAs in the sectors.

=== GDP norms issue (2018) ===
The committee noted in its report titled "Measuring growth, employment and income" that there are several parameters that need to be factored into the calculation of the GDP, like indicators to gauge the environmental resource decay and replenishment efforts made to compensate the loss concluding that - " The committee strongly recommends the government to have mechanisms by coming up with new measures of GDP estimation and statistical measurement of other socio-economic factors "

== Chairpersons ==
=== Chairpersons of the committee (1950–present) ===
Sr. No.	Portrait	Name	Term of office	Terms	Political party (Alliance)
1		M. A. Ayyangar	1950-54	4	INC
2		Balwantray G. Mehta	1954-59	5	INC
3		H.C. Dasappa	1959-63	4	INC
4		Arun C. Guha	1963-67	4	INC
5		P. Venkatasubbaiah	1967-69	2	INC
6		M. Thirumala Rao	1969-71	2	INC
7		Kamal Nath Tewari	1971-74	3	INC
8		R K. Sinha	1974-76	2	INC
9		Bhagwat Jha Azad	1976-77	1	INC
10		Satyendra Narayan Sinha	1977-79	2	INC
11		Baldev Prakash	1979	partial	JP
12		S.B.P. Pattabhi Rama Rao	1980-82	2	INC
13		Bansi Lal	1982-85	3	INC
14		Chintamani Panigrahi	1985-86	1	INC
15		Chandra Tripathi	1987-88	1	INC
16		Asutosh Laha	1988-89	1	INC
17		Jaswant Singh	1990-91	1	BJP
18		Manoranjan Bhakta	1991-93	2	INC
19		Krupasindhu Bhoi	1993-95	2	INC
20		S.B. Sidnal	1995-96	1	INC
21		Rupchand Pal	1996-98	2	CPI(M)
22		Madhukar Sarpotdar	1998-99	1	SS
23		Ummareddy Venkateswarlu	1999-2004	5	INC
24		C. Kuppuswami	2004-09	5	DMK
25		Francisco Sardinha	2009-14	5	INC
26		Murli Manohar Joshi	2014-19	5	BJP
27		Girish Bapat	2019-24	5	BJP
28		Sanjay Jaiswal	2024-incumbent	1	BJP

=== Longest serving chairpersons of committee on Estimates ===
Sr. No.	Name	Terms	Years	Party
1	Balwantray G. Mehta	1954-59	5	INC
2	Ummareddy Venkateswarlu	1999-2004	5	INC
3	C. Kuppuswami	2004-09	5	DMK
4	Francisco Sardinha	2009-14	5	INC
5	Murli Manohar Joshi	2014-19	5	BJP
6	M. A. Ayyangar	1950-54	4	INC

== Reports published ==
As part of its oversight process the committee has published quite a number of reports over the course of its existence. The committee has published a total of 1118 reports from 1950 to 2018. Out of these, 624 are the original reports and 494 are reports on action taken by the government on corresponding reports of the committee.

== See also ==
- 17th Lok Sabha
- Committee on Public Undertakings
- Public Accounts Committee (India)
- Standing Committee on Defence (India)
- Standing Committee on Finance
- List of Indian parliamentary committees
