= Standing Committee on Finance =

Parliamentary body in India

Department Related Standing Committee
- 16th Lok Sabha
- Founded: April 1993; 33 years ago
- Country: India

Leadership
- Chairperson: Bhartruhari Mahtab
- Chairperson party: Bharatiya Janata Party
- Appointer: Speaker of the Lok Sabha

Structure
- Seats: 26 (Lok Sabha: 20) (Rajya Sabha: 6)
- Political parties: BJP (15); INC (3); AITC (1); YSRCP (2); BJD (2); SS (1); SAD (1); RJD (1)
- Election criteria: The members are elected every year from amongst its members of respective houses according to the principle of proportional representation.
- Tenure: 1 year

Jurisdiction
- Purpose: Legislative oversight of the policies and decision making of the following ministries: Ministry of Finance (MOF); Corporate Affairs; Statistics and Programme Implementation; NITI Aayog (succeeding the Planning Commission)

Rules and procedure
- Rules of Procedure and Conduct of Business in Lok Sabha 2014
- Applicable rules: Rule 331 C through N (page 122 - 125); Fifth Schedule (page 158)

The Parliamentary Standing Committee on Finance (SCOF) is a department related standing committee (DRSC) constituted by the Parliament of India comprising selected members of parliament for the purpose of legislative oversight on the policies and decision making of the following four ministries:

1. Ministry of Finance (MoF)
2. Ministry of Corporate Affairs
3. Ministry of Statistics and Programme Implementation
4. NITI Aayog (succeeding the Planning Commission)

The committee consists of thirty-one members, twenty-one elected by Lok Sabha, the lower house of the Parliament, and not more than ten members of Rajya Sabha, the upper house of the Parliament. The members are nominated every year from amongst the members of Lok Sabha by the Lok Sabha Speaker and from amongst the members of Rajya Sabha by the Rajya Sabha Chairman. Efforts are made as far as possible to allocate seats in proportion to party strength in respective houses. The chairperson is appointed by the Lok Sabha speaker. The term of office of the members is one year. A minister is not eligible to become a member of the committee. If a member after his election to the committee becomes a Minister, he ceases to be a member from the date of such appointment.

The committee currently is headed by Veerappa Moily, succeeding Yashwant Sinha from the 15th Lok Sabha.

== History ==
Following the adoption of the Reports of Rules Committees of the 10th Lok Sabha by the two houses on 29 March 1993, the way was paved for the setting up of the seventeen Departmentally Related Standing Committees (DRSCs) covering under their jurisdiction all the ministries or departments of the Government of India. Formally set up in April 1993, the committee used to consist of 45 members— 30 nominated by the Speaker from amongst the members of Lok Sabha and 15 members nominated by the chairman, Rajya Sabha from amongst the members of Rajya Sabha.

However, during the re-structuring of DRSCs in July 2004 by the 14th Lok Sabha, the membership was reduced to 31 members—21 from Lok Sabha and 10 from Rajya Sabha.

The inaugural chairperson of the committee was Debi Prasad Pal, a former Minister of State for Finance (1995–96), member of the 10th Finance Commission, retired judge of the Calcutta High Court and member of the Indian National Congress.

== Scope and Working ==
=== Scope ===
The functions of the committee are stated as below:

- To consider the Demands for Grants of the concerned ministries or departments, preparing reports on the same which are to be tabled in both the houses.
- To examine such bills pertaining to the oversight ministries as are referred to the committee by the Speaker, Lok Sabha or the Chairman, Rajya Sabha.
- To consider the annual reports of the concerned ministries or departments.
- To consider national basic long-term policy documents presented to the houses, if referred to the committee by the Speaker, Lok Sabha or the chairman, Rajya Sabha.

The Standing Committees shall not consider the matters of day-to-day administration of the department.

Proceedings, Draft Reports and Minutes of the committee are treated as ‘Confidential’ until the concerned reports are presented to Parliament.

=== Working ===
Working of the committee has been designed so as to keep individual opinions and statements as confidential, so, that the atmosphere within the committee is more open to discussion without the need to toe the party line or indulge in political grand standing [sic]. The report presented by the committee "is based on a broad consensus and has persuasive value to be treated as considered advice. Hence it is not binding in nature. It is for the minister in charge of the Bill or any member to move necessary amendments in the House in the light of the recommendations or suggestions made by the committee.

It ensures that detailed scrutiny of government finances, legislation and working continues to take place even if Parliament sessions are disrupted. With a representation of members from across political parties, these committees also act as a consensus-building platform.

==== Demands for Grants ====
After the general discussion on the budget in the House is over, the Lok Sabha is adjourned for a fixed period. The Committee considers the Demands for Grants (DFGs) of the concerned ministries or departments under its jurisdiction during the aforesaid period and presents reports on them to the House. There is a separate report on the DFGs of each ministry or department.

==== Bills and Annual Reports ====
The committee considers only such bills introduced in either of the houses as are referred to it by the Speaker, Lok Sabha or the chairman, Rajya Sabha as the case may be.

The committee also selects other subjects for examination on the basis of annual report of the ministries and departments under its jurisdiction

==== Statement of Minister under direction 73A of the Directions by the Speaker, Lok Sabha ====
In terms of direction 73A, the minister concerned of the ministry or department makes a statement once in six months in the House regarding the status of implementation of the recommendations contained in the reports of the DRSCs with regard to her/his Ministry. This is aimed at ensuring that the recommendations of the Standing Committee are taken note of at the highest level by the government for follow up action not suggest anything of the nature of cut motions. The Demands for Grants are considered by the House in the light of the Reports of the committee.

== Composition ==
Keys: BJP (15) INC (3) SAD (1) AITC (1) YSRCP (2) SS (1) BJD (2) RJD (1)

Party-wise membership of Standing Committee on Finance
1. BJP (57.7%)
2. INC (11.5%)
3. AITC (3.80%)
4. SAD (3.80%)
5. YSRCP (7.60%)
6. BJD (7.60%)
7. SS (3.80%)
8. RJD (4.00%)

21 members from 16th Lok Sabha; tenure – May 2018-19
| Sr. No. | Portrait | Name | Constituency, state | Party |
|---|---|---|---|---|
| 1 | | Veerappa Moily^{(Note: Chairperson of the committee for the current year.)} | Chikkballapur, Karnataka | INC |
| 2 | | Pushpendra Singh Chandel | Hamirpur, Uttar Pradesh | BJP |
| 3 | | Bandaru Dattatreya | Secunderabad, Telangana | BJP |
| 4 | | Kirit Somaiya | Mumbai North-East, Maharashtra | BJP |
| 5 | | Nishikant Dubey | Godda, Jharkhand | BJP |
| 6 | | Harish Dwivedi | Basti, Uttar Pradesh | BJP |
| 7 | | Rattan Lal Kataria | Ambala, Haryana | BJP |
| 8 | | Rajiv Pratap Rudy | Saran, Bihar | BJP |
| 9 | | Gopal Shetty | Mumbai North, Maharashtra | BJP |
| 10 | | Kirit Premjibhai Solanki | Ahmedabad West, Gujarat | BJP |
| 11 | | Prathap Simha | Mysore, Karnataka | BJP |
| 12 | | Shivkumar Chanabasappa Udasi | Haveri, Karnataka | BJP |
| 13 | | Saugata Roy | Dum Dum, West Bengal | AITC |
| 14 | | Dinesh Trivedi | Barrackpore, West Bengal | AITC |
| 15 | | T.G. Venkatesh Babu | Chennai North, Tamil Nadu | AIDMK |
| 16 | | Gopalakrishnan Chinnaraj | Nilgiris, Tamil Nadu | AIDMK |
| 17 | | Bhartruhari Mahtab | Cuttack, Odisha | BJD |
| 18 | | Chandrakant Bhaurao Khaire | Aurangabad, Maharashtra | SS |
| 19 | | Jyotiraditya Scindia | Guna, Madhya Pradesh | INC |
| 20 | | Rayapati Sambasiva Rao | Narasaraopet, Andhra Pradesh | TDP |
| 21 | | Prem Das Rai | Sikkim, Sikkim | SDF |
Notes

10 members from the Rajya Sabha
| Sr. No. | Name | State Legislature | Party |
|---|---|---|---|
| 1 | Rajeev Chandrasekhar | Karnataka | BJP |
| 2 | Mahesh Poddar | Jharkhand | BJP |
| 3 | Manmohan Singh | Assam | INC |
| 4 | Digvijaya Singh | Madhya Pradesh | INC |
| 5 | T.K. Rangarajan | Tamil Nadu | CPI(M) |
| 6 | C. M. Ramesh | Andhra Pradesh | TDP |
| 7 | Anil Desai | Maharashtra | SS |
| 8 | A. Navaneethakrishnan | Tamil Nadu | AIDMK |
| 9 | Mahendra Prasad | Bihar | JD(U) |
| 10 | Narendra Jadhav | Nominated | — |

== Comments in recent years ==
=== Demonetisation (2016) ===
The committee has deposed the RBI governor and other government officials since the announcement for demonetisation was made. In Oct 2018, summoning the RBI governor for the third time, Chairperson Moily said, "[a]fter our meetings with the RBI chief and other senior officials of the RBI, it had given us a report. Now, we have called RBI governor Urjit Patel to come and brief us on demonetization and a legislative bill. Some members might also want to ask him questions." The notice for the meeting says, “Oral Evidence of the representatives of Reserve Bank of India on (i) ‘Demonetisation of Indian currency notes of Rs 500 and Rs 1000 and ramifications thereof’ and (ii) ‘The Banning of Unregulated Deposit Schemes Bill, 2018’ and issues related thereto."

=== The merger of Railway budget with Union Budget (2016) ===
In a sweeping recast of India’s annual budget process, the government ended the 92-year-old practice of having a separate rail budget. Commenting on this, Chairperson Moily said, "[w]e will discuss this issue with statistics and planning department, and also with the finance ministry. Railway Board, an important cog in this merger process, too will be consulted on the impact of this budgetary reform on Railways as an organization."

=== Punjab National Bank fraud (2018) ===
The committee questioned the finance ministry civil servants including the Union Financial Services Secretary, Rajiv Kumar about the ₹11,400 crore (equivalent to ₹170 billion or US$1.8 billion in 2026) fraud in Punjab National Bank (PNB) and asked them to submit a report on it. It is currently on its way to becoming India's biggest banking fraud. Other members noted that "[t]heir concern over such large scale [sic] fraud in the PNB and questioned the re-capitalization process of the state-run banks when they are not well managed and tax payers [sic] money is leaking".

=== IL&FS default (2018) ===
The committee took up the case of debt-ridden Infrastructure Leasing & Financial Services, which defaulted on debt obligations for scrutiny a day after the government sacked the 15-member IL&FS board and nominated six new directors led by Uday Kotak, to run the affairs of the company. The chairperson of the SCOF, Moily said that "[w]hatever has happened at IL&FS is a matter of grave concern. It is a fit case for the Parliamentary Standing Committee on Finance to look into. As the chairman, I will take up the matter in the committee meeting"

== Chairpersons ==
=== Chairpersons of the committee (1993–till date) ===
| Sr. No. | Name | Term of office | Terms | Political party (Alliance) |
|---|---|---|---|---|
| 1 | Debi Prasad Pal | 1993-95 | 2 | INC |
| 2 | No public records found | 1995-99 | 4 | — |
| 4 | Shivraj Patil | 1999-2002 | 3 | INC |
| 5 | N. Janardhana Reddy | 2002-04 | 2 | INC |
| 6 | Maj Gen. BC Khanduri (Retd.) | 2004-07 | 3 | BJP |
| 7 | Ananth Kumar | 2007-09 | 2 | BJP |
| 8 | Murli Manohar Joshi | 2009-2010 | 1 | BJP |
| 9 | Yashwant Sinha | 2010-14 | 4 | BJP |
| 10 | Veerappa Moily | 2014-19 | 5 | INC |
| 11 | Jayant Sinha | 2019- Incumbent | 4 | BJP |

== Reports published ==
As part of its oversight process, the committee has published quite a number of reports over the course of its existence. The committee has published a total of 277 reports from 1993 to 2015. Out of these, 92 are reports on Demands for Grants (DFGs), 13 reports on subjects taken up by the committee, 72 reports on bills referred to the committee and 100 are reports on action taken by the government on corresponding reports of the committee.

| Lok Sabha | Tenure | Demands for Grants | Subjects | Bills | ATRs | Total reports presented |
|---|---|---|---|---|---|---|
| 10th Lok Sabha | 1991–96 | 7 | 3 | 8 | 5 | 23 |
| 11th Lok Sabha | 1996–98 | 4 | — | | 1 | 5 |
| 12th Lok Sabha | 1998–99 | 6 | — | 7 | 8 | 21 |
| 13th Lok Sabha | 1999–04 | 20 | 1 | 10 | 24 | 55 |
| 14th Lok Sabha | 2004–09 | 25 | 3 | 23 | 29 | 80 |
| 15th Lok Sabha | 2009–14 | 25 | 6 | 24 | 29 | 84 |
| 16th Lok Sabha | 2014–continuing | 5 | — | | 4 | 9 |
| Grand total | | 92 | 13 | 72 | 100 | 277 |

== See also ==
- 17th Lok Sabha
- Committee on Public Undertakings
- Estimates Committee
- Public Accounts Committee (India)
- Standing Committee on Defence (India)
- List of Indian parliamentary committees
