= Samode Palace =

Palatial suite in Jaipur

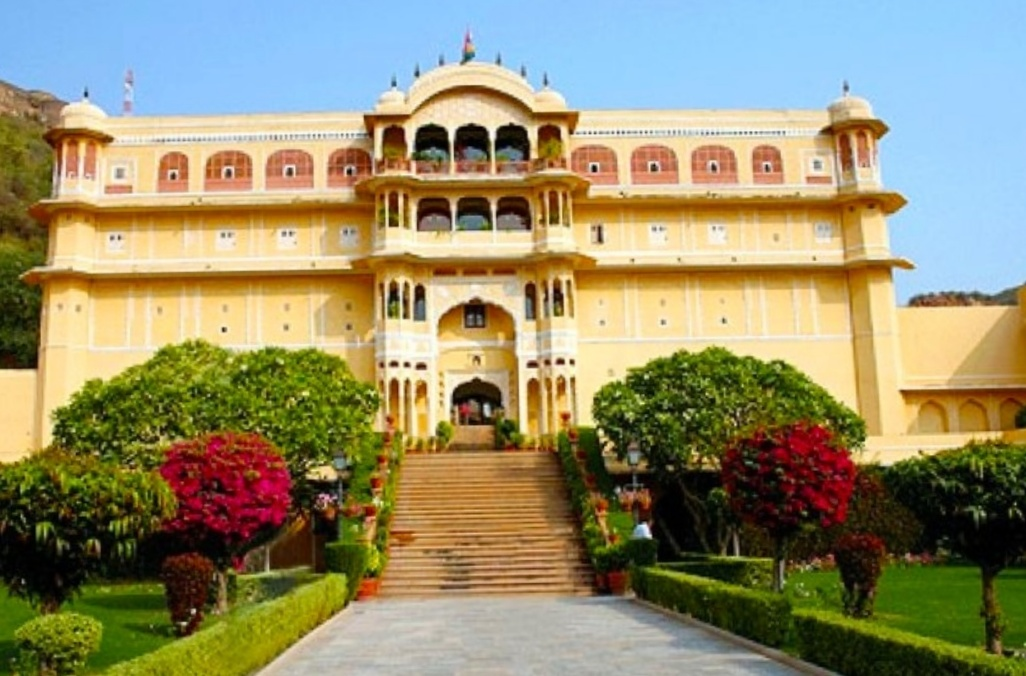
- Samode Palace Façade

- Location within Rajasthan

General information
- Architectural style: Rajput architecture
- Location: Samode and Jaipur, India
- Coordinates: 27.205°N 75.8055°E
- Completed: 16th century
- Client: Rawals

Technical details
- Structural system: Marble and masonry

Design and construction
- Architect: Rawal Berisal

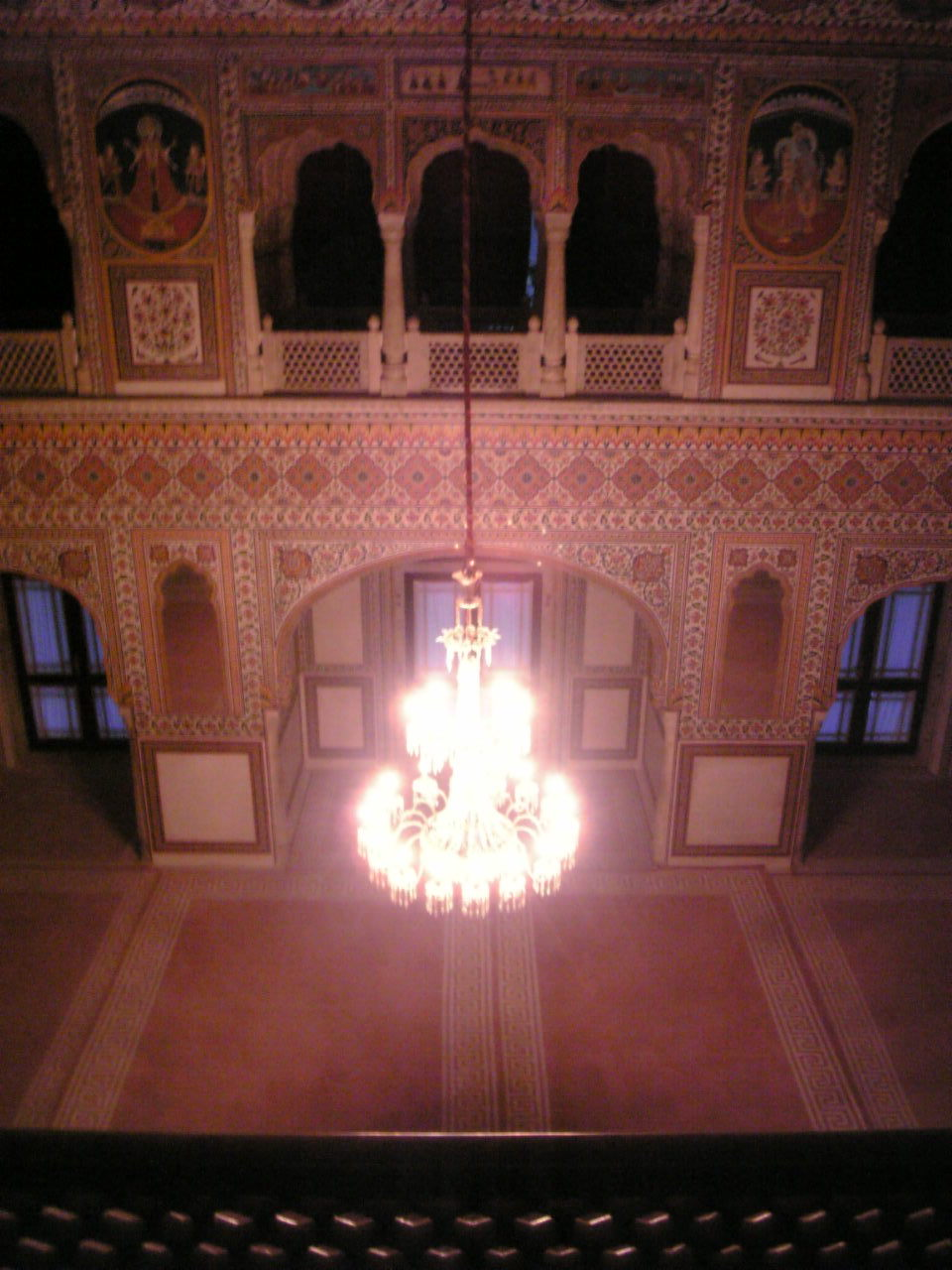
Inside the Samode Haveli

Samode Palace, Samode Haveli and Samode Bagh (Garden) are heritage monuments and structures built by the noble feudatory with the hereditary title of 'Maha Rawal' or 'Maha Saheb’ of the Amber and Jaipur principality in Rajasthan, India. All three have rich history of several hundred years and display a fusion of Mughal and Rajasthani art and architecture. They are now part of the Heritage group of hotels under the flagship name of "Samode" that are run by the hereditary owners of these structures. The Samode Palace is located 40 kilometres (25 mi) north of Jaipur city, the Samode Haveli is close to Jaipur (centrally located within city limits, 6 kilometres (3.7 mi) away from the city railway station) and the Samode Bagh or Garden, 4 kilometres (2.5 mi) from the palace which is also run as a luxury hotel.

Many Hindi feature films have been pictured with the settings of the palace. The 1984 American HBO TV serial adaptation of the Raj-romance novel The Far Pavilions was also filmed in the palace precincts and starred Ben Cross, Amy Irving, Omar Sharif and Christopher Lee.

== History ==
Samode is a large town in Rajasthan, which belonged to the landlords known as ‘zamindars’ (in Hindi language) of the principal thakurs of the state of Amber. It shot into prominence due to the Thakurs lineage traced to Maharaja Rajveer Singhji, the 17th prince of the house of Kacchwaha Rajputs. Samode was bequeathed to Gopal Singhji one of his 12 sons, as a noble feudatory of the Amber and Jaipur principality. Samode was, even then, considered a very rich town under the kingdom of Amber. Behari Das, a Rajput warrior who was then in Mughal service of the Nathawat clan inherited the Zamindari of Somede. It was under the British Raj but was restored to the Nathawat clan with the hereditary title 'Rawal Saheb' or 'Maha Rawal' (title conferred for their valiance and loyalty to the royal family), in 1757, and this lineage is continued to this date.

Samode Palace was initially built in the sixteenth century as a Rajput fort, but in the early 19th century, under the nobleman Rawal Berisal, it was converted from a fort into an exquisitely designed palace in Rajput and Muslim architectural style. Rawal Berisal, during this time also served as the chief minister of Rajasthan and exercised full powers. He was signatory, on behalf of the Maharaja of Jaipur, to the treaty signed in 1818 with the British East India Company, which gave it the status of a protectorate to Jaipur. Rawal Sheo Singh, a descendant of Rawal Berisal, who was the prime minister of Jaipur state for several years, during the middle of the 19th century, further expanded the palace by adding the Durbar Hall (considered as "extravagantly florid and hand painted") with a gallery and the Sheesh Mahal or the hall of mirrors. In 1987, it was converted into the heritage "Samode Palace Hotel".

Samode haveli was also built by Rawal Sheo Singh more than 150 years ago. It was built as a resort for the royal family.

Samode Bagh or Samode garden was landscaped more than 150 years ago by one of the sons of Maharaja Prithiraj Singhji of Jaipur. It was patterned on the lines of Mughal gardens, which the Mughals had developed in other parts of their kingdom as a retreat for relaxation and enjoyment. The royal family of Samode also established a similar garden 4 kilometres away from their Samode Palace.

== Geography and climate ==
Geographically, the three monuments and the village of Samode and its structures are in the pristine hill range of the Aravalli Range in northwestern India.

The climate at Samode is severe with summer heat reaching as high as 45 °C (113 °F) and winter temperatures dropping to 4 °C (39 °F).

== Structures ==
The three heritage structures are:

=== Samode palace ===
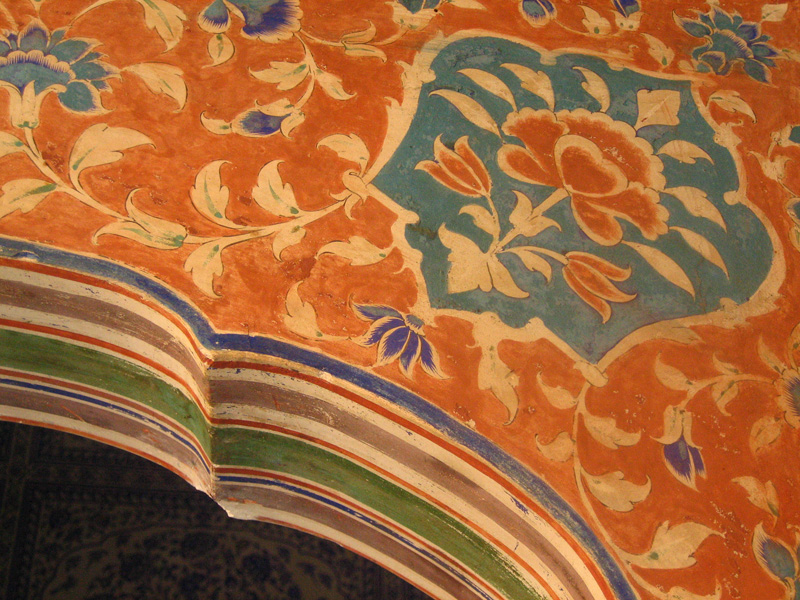
Decorative arch

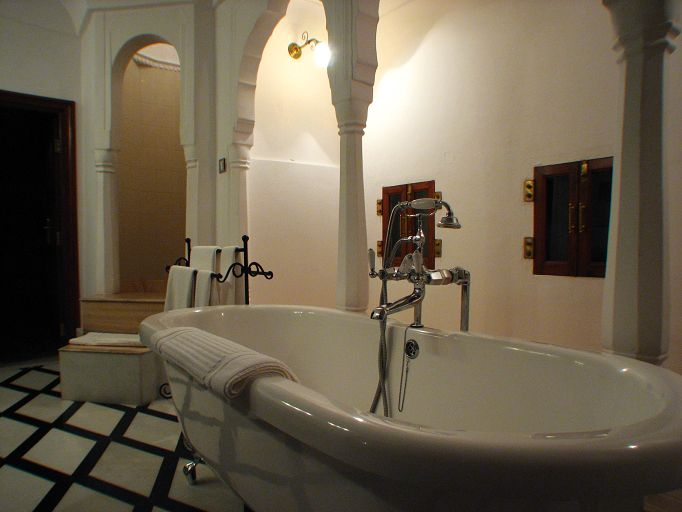
Palace bathroom

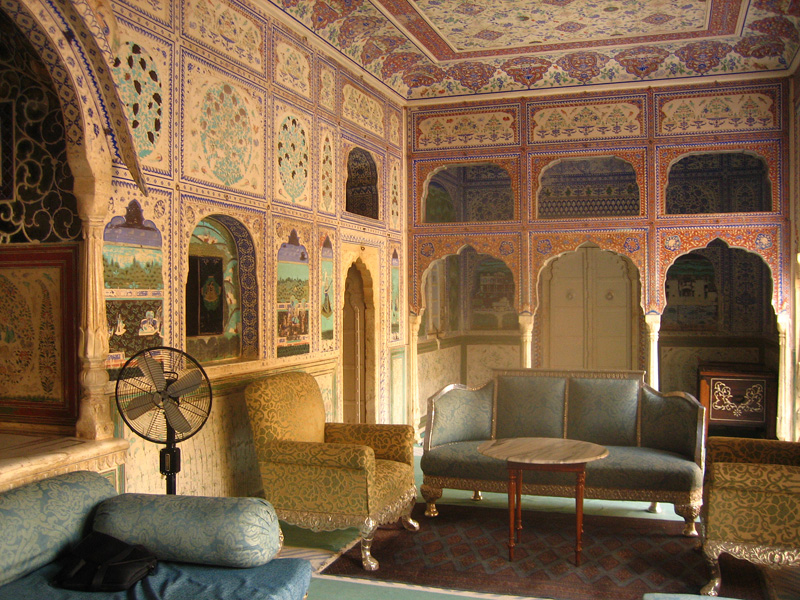
Palace Lounge

The palace, built by the noblemen of the court of the royal family, is located near the Samode village on the outskirts of Shekhawat. It is built of sandstone at the foot of the Aravalli range of hills (the foremost mountain range of north-western India) with a fortress-like setting. The interiors of the palace are composed in the ancient architectural style of Rajasthan: marble floors, intricately ornamented pillars, mosaic walls (with tiny pieces of small inlaid stones), with luxurious carpets, and decorated with old wall paintings (hunting scenes, floral motifs and so forth). At the entrance gate of the palace is a unique piece of a large-sized treasure chest made of dark wood with marble settings and gleaming glass. The Sheesh Mahal (Hall of Mirrors) is located on the southern side of the palace. The frescoes in the Durbar Hall and in the Sultan Mahal are said to be 250 years old. The palace is built on three levels (planned in a sequence of courtyards of increasing height) with a patio on each floor. There is an old ruined fort above the palace from where a panoramic view of the valley could be seen. The fort area is overgrown with vegetation but stone paved paths have been built to reach the fort heights. Samode fort was the former residence of the Maharaja. It is said that an underground passage links it to the palace that provided access at times of emergency. It is now approached by a well laid out stone paved path (300 steps). There is also an entry gate to the ruined fort. Two other forts close by complete the circuit of a circular walk from and back to the palace. There is also a small temple, 3 kilometres away from the fort.

The Samode village near the palace is noted for its cloth made by block printing and also for handicrafts such as bangle making. There is a small artists' colony in the village where miniature paintings are made.

=== Samode haveli ===
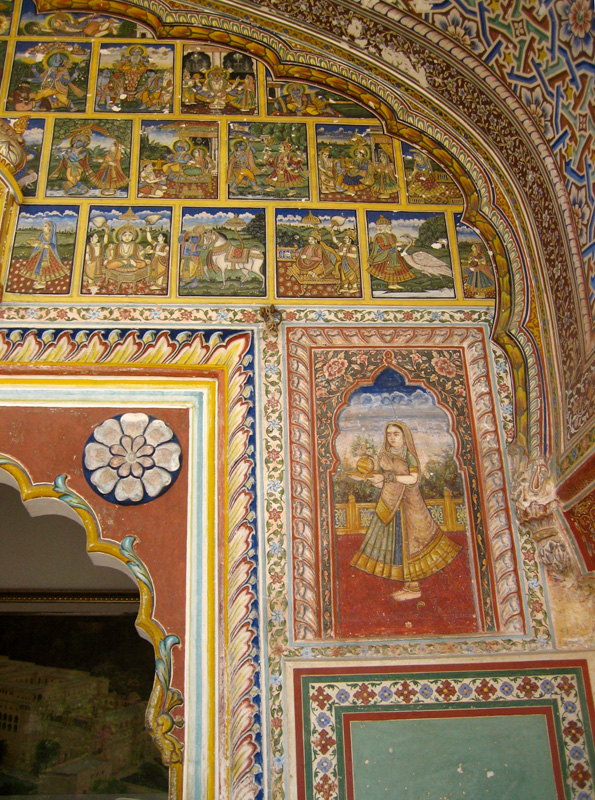
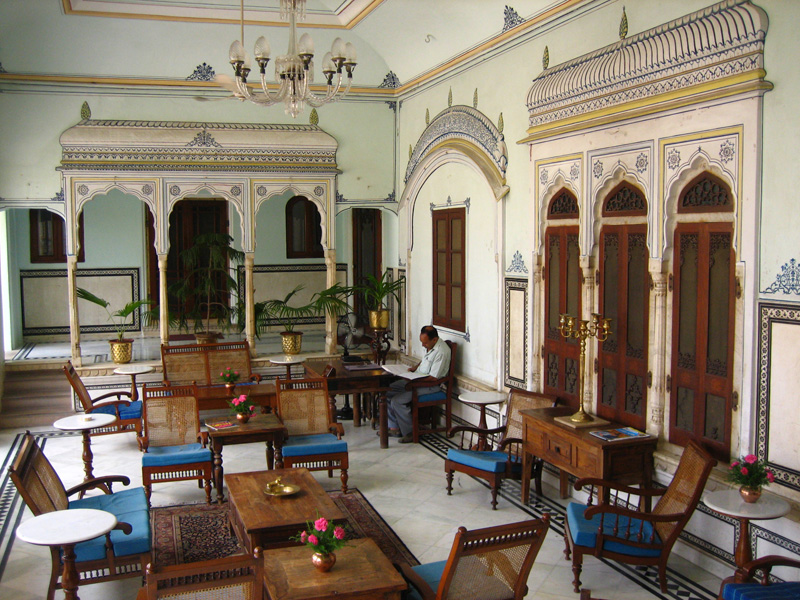
Left: entrance arch
Right: Haveli lounge

The haveli is built facing north. It has an elegant painted dining room and an air passage. It has a unique ambiance of the historic juxtaposed against a contemporary setting. An elephant ramp, specially constructed at the entrance to the haveli, was laid in 1940 on the occasion of the marriage ceremony of a member of the royal family.

=== Samode bagh ===
Samode Bagh, or garden, a 16th-century Mughal-style garden, enclosed by a 15-foot (4.6 m)-high wall is spread over an area of 20 acres (8.1 ha). It also has 44 sandbank coloured tents with air-conditioning to accommodate visitors. It blends traditional Rajasthan and Mughal décor with the Victorian style, with modern facilities. It has a 200-foot (61 m)-long water channel with a row of fountains that are fed by springs and wells. The tent walls also depict elegant paintings in Mughal art. The tents have been furnished with carpets, standing lamps and well designed beds and chairs and other modern facilities. There is also a 150-year-old pavilion within the precincts of the garden.

== Visitor information ==
The palace, the haveli and the garden are at a distance of 42 kilometres (26 mi), 6 kilometres (3.7 mi) and 45 kilometres (28 mi) respectively from Jaipur. Jaipur, in turn, is well connected by rail, road, and air to other major Indian cities. Jaipur is 260 kilometres (160 mi) from Delhi by road on the National Highway NH-8.

Entry to the palace costs Rs 1000 per person as of 15 August 2015. This includes a tour of the palace and can be credited towards food and drink in the courtyard restaurant. The tour includes the ladies waiting rooms, the shish mahal (room of mirrors), the Durbar hall, and the pool area (viewing only, no swimming).
