= Jagdish Narayan Meena =

Member of the Rajasthan Legislative Assembly for Jamwa Ramgarh
- Incumbent
- Assumed office 11 December 2013
- Preceded by: Gopal Meena

Personal details
- Born: 20 July 1963 (age 62) Todameena, Jamwa Ramgarh, Jaipur
- Party: Bharatiya Janata Party

Jagdish Narayan Meena is a politician of Rajasthan, India. He is former MLA for the Jamwa Ramgarh constituency of Rajasthan Legislative Assembly.
