= Ramgarh Lake =

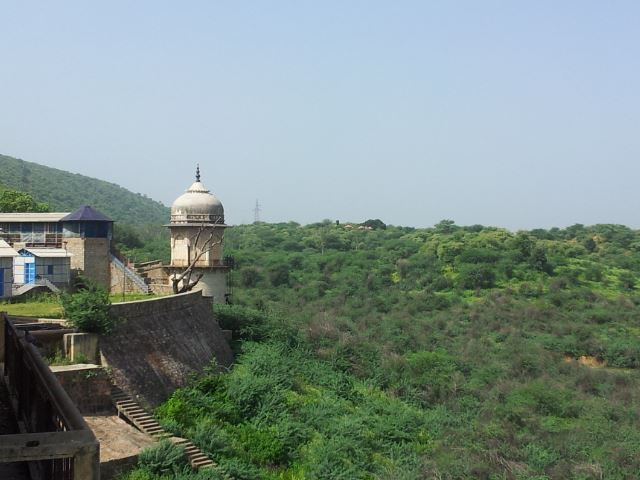
- View of Ramgarh lake in Ramgarh (Jaipur district, Rajasthan)

- Location within India
- Location: Jamwa Ramgarh, Jaipur district, Rajasthan, India
- Coordinates: 27.0477°N 76.0556°E
- Type: artificial lake
- Basin countries: India
- Surface area: 15.5 square kilometres (6.0 sq mi)

Ramgarh Lake was a lake situated in Jamwa Ramgarh, near Jaipur city in the Jaipur district in Indian state of Rajasthan. The last time the lake received water was 1999 and it has been dry since 2000. It is situated 32 kilometres (20 mi) from Jaipur, the district headquarters and covers a maximum area of 15.5 square kilometres (6.0 sq mi). The lake was built by Maharaja Sawai Ram Singh II in 1876 to provide relief to the inhabitants of Ramgarh. At one time the lake was the main source of water supply to Jaipur City. It was a popular picnic spot, particularly after the rainy season.

== History ==
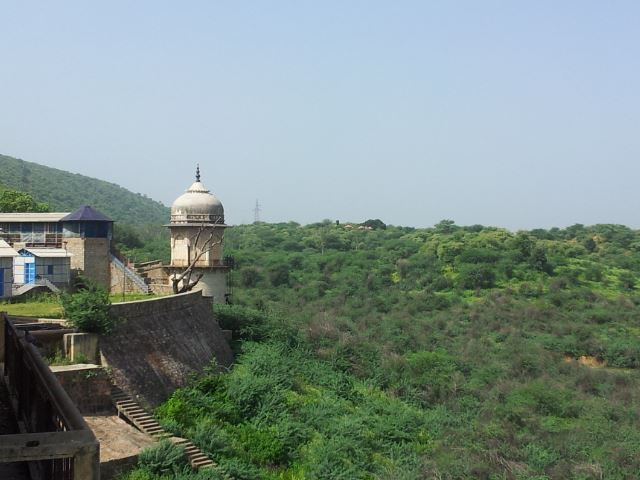
Ramgarh Lake, Jaipur district, India, 2014.

During the 1982 Asian Games the rowing events were held on Ramgarh Lake. Localities believe that the water body has died a premature death due to the carelessness of state government. In 2011 the Rajasthan High Court had ordered the district administration to remove numerous encroachments that came up in the catchment area halting the free flow of water to it. However encroachment in the catchment area of dam still prevails and there is little hope that the water will be recharged.

== Ramgarh Wildlife Sanctuary ==
The dense forest surrounding the lake and the nearby areas was declared a wildlife sanctuary by the Government of India in 1982. There are ruins of an old fort and temple of Jambwa Mata. The sanctuary is part of the Khathiar-Gir dry deciduous forests ecoregion. It is home for a wide range of wildlife including chital and nilgai.

== Ramgarh Dam catchment area ==
There are a number of villages that comes under the dam's catchment area. They include Chandawas (Amer), Mamtori Kala, Sangawala and Bishanpura.

== See also ==
- Jaipur district
- List of lakes in India
