= Jai Singh III =

Maharaja of Jaipur (1819–1835)

Sawai Jai Singh III
- Maharaja Sawai of Jaipur
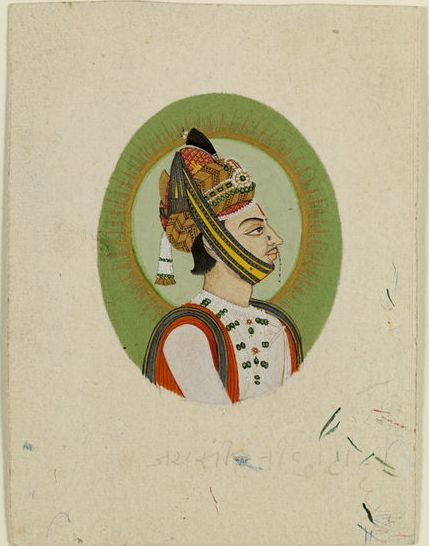
- Reign: 1819 - 6 February 1835
- Predecessor: Jagat Singh
- Successor: Ram Singh II
- Born: 25 April 1819; Jaipur, Rajputana
- Died: 6 February 1835 (aged 15)
- Spouse: Devariji (Chauhanji) Ratan Kanwarji d.of Maharao Shiv Singh of Sirohi; Chawdiji of Arjiya in Mewar; Sisodiniji of Banera in Mewar; Chandrawatji of Sheopur in Jaipur
- Issue: Ram Singh II
- House: Kachhwaha
- Father: Jagat Singh of Amber
- Mother: Bhatiyaniji (Rawalotji) Anand Kanwarji d.of Rao Raj Singh of Jakhan in Jodhpur-Marwar
- Religion: Hinduism

Sawai Jai Singh III (25 April 1819 – 6 February 1835), was the Kachwaha ruler of Jaipur. He was born posthumously after the sudden death of his father Sawai Jagat Singh of Amber .He was the father of his successor and only son Sawai Ram Singh II

== Early life ==
He was a son of Jagat Singh of Amber, Maharaja of Jaipur.

Maharaja Sawai Jagat Singhji died under suspicious circumstances in November 1818 without any medical issues and hence Jaipur became heirless. Mohan Singh later Raja Mohan Singhji, from the Thikana of Narwar, was adopted in order to be enthroned. However, in April 1819, the Bhatiyani Queen Anand Kanwarji of Jagat Singh gave birth to a son who was later named Jai Singh III and declared king.

== Career ==
Jai Singh III spent the first 9 years of his life within the confines of the zenana, making his first public appearance in a procession to the Jamwa Mata Temple after the people of Jaipur demanded to see their ruler. The task of administration was entrusted to Rawal Berisal of Samode. Constant troubles were created by Sanghi Jhutha Ram and Roopan Badaran, the former a suspect in the sudden death of Jagat Singh. In 1812, Jaipur's first Political Agent, J. Stewart, moved into Maji ka Bagh, a garden that had been laid by Jai Singh II's queen. This came to be known as the Residency and is now the Raj Mahal Hotel.

== Death ==
Jai Singh died on 6 February 1835 amidst a cloud of suspicion. His body was found wrapped in a tent. It was suspected that he was poisoned and murdered by Sanghi Jhutha Ram.
