= Tholai =

Tholai is a village in Jamwa Ramgarh tehsil in Jaipur District of Rajasthan State, India. It belongs to Jaipur Division. It is located 40 km towards East from district headquarters Jaipur. 6 km from Jamwa Ramgarh. 37 km from state capital Jaipur.

Tholai pin code is 303001 and postal head office is Jamwaramgarh.

Raipur (3 km), Khawarani (4 km), Andhi (6 km), Lalwas (7 km), Bhawani (9 km) are the nearby Villages to Tholai. Tholai is surrounded by Bassi tehsil towards South, Dausa Tehsil towards East, Amber Tehsil towards west, Jaipur tehsil towards west.

Jaipur, Bandikui, Rajgarh (Alwar), Lalsot are the nearby Cities to Tholai.

== 2011 Census ==
Tholai people speaks Rajasthani and Hindi. Tholai Village Total population is 8000 and number of houses are 963. Female population is 47.2%. Village literacy rate is 56.0% and the female literacy rate is 75%.

== Nearest airport ==
Tholai's nearest airport is Jaipur International Airport situated at 36.8 km distance.

== Nearest town/city ==
Tholai's nearest town/city/important place is Dausa located at the distance of 27.2 kilometer. Surrounding town/city/TP/CT from Tholai are as follows.

Dausa	27.2 km.
Chomu	41.3 km.
Dungarpur	44.7 km.
Alwar	47.5 km.
Chaksu	49.1 km.

== Schools ==
Tholai nearest schools has been listed as follows.

Sr sec School Raipur	2.5 km
Sr Sc School Khawaraniji	2.9 km.
Higher Primary School Kharkara	4.9 km.
Govt Sr Hr Sec School Jamwaramgarh	9.3 km.
Vinayka Public School	9.4 km.
Senior Secondary School Chanwan	13.9 km.
