= Mahendra Pal Meena =

Indian politician

Member of the Rajasthan Legislative Assembly
- Incumbent
- Assumed office 2023
- Preceded by: Gopal Meena

Personal details
- Party: Bharatiya Janata Party

Mahendra Pal Meena is an Indian politician. He was elected as a member of 16th Rajasthan Assembly from Jamwa Ramgarh constituency. He is a member of Bharatiya Janata Party.
