= Bassi, India =

Bassi
- Town
- Bassi
- Location in Rajasthan Location in India
- Country: India
- State: Rajasthan
- District: Jaipur

Population (2011)
  - Total: 26,029
- Time zone: UTC+5:30 (Indian Standard Time)

Bassi is a sub-division of Jaipur district in the state of Rajasthan. It is approximately 30 km from Jaipur city which is now considered a part of the main city. The sub-district had a population of 283,594 (2011 census) spread over 210 villages.

Bassi is a town and situated on NH 21. About 27 km from Dausa. Bassi is also a legislative assembly of Rajasthan and current MLA of Bassi is Laxman Meena. The population of bassi town is approximately 45000. Bassi is a "Nagarpalika" declared by Govt. of Rajasthan in 2020.

== List of villages ==
- Akhaipura
- Birajpura
- Badwa
- Banskhoh
- Bainada
- Banskhoh
- Bhateri
- Bhajhupura
- Bhoodla
- Boodthal
- Chainpura
- Dhindhol
- Danau Kalan
- Doodhali
- Dudawalju
- Dyoudha Chord
- Gudha Chak
- Geela Ki Nangal
- Garh
- Girdharipura
- Hans Mahal
- Himmatpura
- Heerawala
- Jatwara
- Jeetawala
- Jhar
- Kacholiya
- Kanota
- Karangarh
- Kashipura
- Khori
- Lasadiya Gurjaran
- Lasadiya Brahmnan
- Khatepura
- Khijuriya Brahmnan
- Khijuriya Jatan
- Kuthada Khurd
- Kuthada Kalan
- Khokhawala
- Lalgarh
- Madhogarh
- Manoharpura
- Mansar Khedi
- Mohanpura
- Maharajpuara
- Padasoli
- Palawala Jatan
- Patan
- Phaliyawas
- Rajpura Patalwas
- Ramratanpura
- Ramsar Palawala
- Ramsinghpura
- Sambhariya
- Shrirampura
- Trilokpura
- Tahtada
- Toda Bhata
- Toonga
- Rojwari
- Charanwas
- Damodarpura
- Shyampura
- Chawandiya

== Places of interest ==
- Balveri santoshi mata temple Birajpura
- Neelkantheswar Mahadev Temple, Shyampura
- Nainath Temple, Banskho
- Madhogarh Fort, Madhogarh
- Tekchandpura Fort
- Bainada Shreeji Temple
- Bhomiyaji Temple
- Balram Das Ashram
- Mahatma Gandhi stadium, Bassi
- Data Mata Temple, JHIR
- Dhayawan Mata Temple, Bhonayawala
- Shiv Temple Rohitaspura
- Shri Seeta Ram Mandir (1749), Ramsar Palawala (RPS)
- Bidaji Maharaj Bassi
- Bansidhar Mandir main market Bassi
- Balaji Mandir Rajadhok
- Ratannath temple in Phaliyawas
- Banskho fort & garh
- Kotwalo ki Dhani
- Chamunda mata mandir Toda Bhata
- kheda baba ka mandir khori
- Badgoti ki dhani bassi ( badgoti farm house) dudhali road bassi
- Gopinath Ji ka Mandir, Bassi
