= Bhasinghpura =

Village in Rajasthan, India

- Village
- Location within Rajasthan Location within India
- Coordinates: 26°55′08″N 75°20′30″E
- Country: India
- State: Rajasthan
- District: Jaipur district

Area
  - Total: 553.54 ha (1,367.8 acres)

Population (2011)
  - Total: 1,241
- Time zone: UTC+5:30 (IST)
- PIN: 303328

Bhasinghpura is a village in Jaipur district in Rajasthan, India. Bhasinghpura has a total population of 1,241 peoples according to Census 2011. Bhasinghpura 64 km away from district headquarter Jaipur.
