= Phulera =

Phulera Fulera
- Town
- Location in Rajasthan, India Phulera (India)
- Coordinates: 26.87°N 75.23°E
- Country: India
- State: Rajasthan
- District: Jaipur

Government
  - Type: Panchayat

Area
  - Total: 208 km^{2} (80 sq mi)
- Elevation: 387 m (1,270 ft)

Population (2011)
  - Total: 26,091
  - Density: 125/km^{2} (325/sq mi)

Language, Hindi, Rajasthani
  - Official: Hindi, Rajasthani
- Time zone: UTC+5:30 (IST)
- Postal code: 303338
- ISO 3166 code: RJ-IN
- Website: http://www.apnaphulera.in/

Phulera is a town in Jaipur district in the Indian state of Rajasthan. It is situated near Jaipur city, the state capital. The DMIC (Delhi-Mumbai Industrial Corridor) project runs through Phulera. It is a major railway junction.

== Geography ==
Phulera is located at 26.87°N 75.23°E. It has an average elevation of 387 metres (1269 feet).

== Demographics ==
As of 2001 India census, Phulera had a population of around 98,289. Males constitute 52% of the population and females 48%. Phulera has an average literacy rate of 86.5%, male literacy is 94.84%, and female literacy is 77.57%. In Phulera, 13% of the population is under 6 years of age.

== Transport ==
Phulera Junction railway station is on the Jaipur-Ahmedabad line. It has five platforms, platform no 4 & no 5 use for Jaipur – Ajmer – Ahmedabad route. It is one of the important railway junctions of North Western Railway zone headquartered in Jaipur. Phulera is a junction which separates two major lines of Ajmer and Jodhpur. It was one of the biggest yards a few years before. There was also a diesel locomotive depot.

There is no official bus-stand but you can easily get a bus service for Jaipur every 1 hour. There is also bus service for Delhi at night around 10 PM every night.

== See also ==
- Jaitpura
- Phulera (Rajasthan Assembly constituency)
- Phulera(h), a town and former princely state in the Northwest Frontier Province

== Tourist places near Phulera ==
- Sambhar Salt Lake
- Naliasar Civilization
- Dadu Palka
- Bherana
- Shakambhari Temple
