= Tadawas =

- village
- Interactive map of Tadawas
- Coordinates: 26.9512°N 73.4306°E
- Country: India
- State: Rajasthan

Population (2011)
  - Total: 2,306

Languages
  - Official: Hindi
- Time zone: UTC+5:30 (IST)
- ISO 3166 code: RJ-IN

Tadawas is a village in Jaipur district, Rajasthan, India. According to the 2011 census of India, it had a population of 2306.
