= Mohan Singh of Narwar =

Indian prince

Mohan Singh was a prince of Narwar and briefly served as the Maharaja of Jaipur from 21 November 1818 to 25 April 1819.

== Biography ==
He was born to Manohar Singh, the Rana of Narwar. His father was removed from Narwar by the Scindia of Gwalior. Though Narwar was the parent house of the Jaipur royal family, it was left without an heir at one point. As a result, a son of Prithvi Singh I was adopted into Narwar, and the lineage continued through him. Mohan was the fourteenth in line of descent from Prithvi Singh I. When Jagat Singh died on 21 November 1818 without a male heir by birth or adoption, and with no close male relative to succeed him, the throne of Jaipur became vacant. However, according to the political and religious laws of Rajputana at the time, in the absence of a natural heir, the funeral pyre had to be lit by an adopted child. Therefore, selecting a successor to the deceased became necessary. Mohan Ram Nazir, an eunuch at the City Palace in Jaipur, wielded influence both within the Zenana Deorhi and in politics beyond it. Along with a group of courtiers, he proclaimed Mohan as the deceased successor. They placed him on the vacant throne of Jaipur and crowned him Maharaja with the regnal name Sawai Man Singh. He was nine years old at the time. He later led the funeral procession of Jagat Singh and lit his funeral pyre. His succession caused great discontent among the state's nobles and its people. When Mohan Ram Nazir sought the support of Man Singh, the Maharaja of Jodhpur, to recognize Mohan Singh as the Maharaja of Jaipur, Man replied that he would gladly do so once the Bara Kotri (transl. twelve chambers) consented. He also requested David Ochterlony, the British resident in Rajputana, to reach Jaipur immediately or at least send his deputy to personally verify his contention and recognize Mohan's succession, but the resident declined. After some time, it was announced that Jagat Singh's widow, Bhatianiji, was pregnant. To legitimize Mohan's claim, the Nazir attempted to arrange a marriage between Mohan and the granddaughter of the Maharana of Mewar. Meanwhile, Mohan Ram Nazir kept urging David Ochterlony to visit Jaipur, assuring him that he was prepared to face punishment if he had acted unjustly or dishonorably. Ochterlony arrived in Jaipur on 9 April 1819. When Ochterlony arrived in Jaipur, negotiations for the marriage were underway. Ochterlony informed Mewar's agent, Ajit Singh, that if a son was born to Bhatianiji, Mohan would lose his claim to the throne. On 25 April 1819, when Bhatianiji gave birth to a son, Mohan Singh was removed from the throne, and the infant was placed on it as Jai Singh III.
