= Govindgarh =

Govindgarh may be

  - Govindgarh, Uttar Pradesh, a village in Gautam Buddh Nagar District, Uttar Pradesh
- Govindgarh, Madhya Pradesh, a city in Rewa District, Madhya Pradesh
- Govindgarh, Rajasthan, a city in Alwar District, Rajasthan
