= Sheo Singh Nathawat =

Rawal of Samode from 1838 to 1854

Sheo Singh was the Rawal of Samode and Diwan of Jaipur.

== Succession ==
Following the death of his father, Bairi Sal, in 1838, he succeeded him as the Rawal of Samode.

== Diwan of Jaipur ==
Maji Chandrawati had appointed him Diwan (transl. Prime Minister) of Jaipur. Although his appointment to the office was made without prior approval from the Governor-General of India, it was later ratified by the Governor-General. When Major Ross was appointed as the permanent agent stationed in Jaipur in 1838, Maji summoned Sheo and his brother Lakshman Singh and asked them to sign a bond of loyalty, which they refused. They brought the entire episode to the attention of the British resident and the agent, who subsequently stripped Maji of her powers. Later, a mutiny occurred involving the Nagas and other troops of Jaipur stationed at Ramgarh. It is believed that Maji incited the mutiny. In response, British troops were deployed from Nasirabad, and the issue was resolved by offering the Nagas employment in exchange for their services, while the troops were pacified by providing them with their overdue payments. Afterward, he dismissed the commander of the State forces and appointed his brother, Lakshman Singh, as Army Minister in his place. He restored Khandela to Abhai Singh and Pratap Singh. Though Ram Singh II was invested with full ruling powers in 1851, administrative authority remained with Sheo Singh. Ram Singh refrained from intervening in state affairs until 1854, when, frustrated by his exclusion and by Sheo's extravagant spending and mismanagement, he sought the advice of Henry Lawrence. He dismissed Sheo from his position and appointed his brother, Lakshman Singh, to the vacant post in 1854.

== Personal life ==
He was held in high regard by the Government of India, which permitted him to maintain a retinue of 2,000 soldiers and carry various emblems of a Raja during his trips or pilgrimages. He was also greatly admired by the people of Jaipur.

== Later life ==
He was in Delhi when the Indian Rebellion of 1857 broke out and had to remain there until the situation stabilized. There, he was summoned by Bahadur Shah II, who instructed him to persuade his liege lord, the Maharaja of Jaipur, to rise against the East India Company and remain loyal to the Mughal Empire, as his ancestors had. He assured the Mughal Emperor that he would do so and obtained his permission and means to reach Jaipur.
