= Kishangarh Renwal =

- city
- Nickname: Renwal
- Location in Rajasthan, India Kishangarh Renwal (India)
- Coordinates: 27°09′34″N 75°21′31″E
- Country: India
- State: Rajasthan
- District: Jaipur
- Established: 25 March 1906
- Founder: Chomu Ruler Kishan Singh

Government
  - Type: Democratic & Local Self Govt body
  - Body: Nagarpalika B

Population (2011)
  - Total: 29,201

Languages
  - Official: Hindi
  - Local: Rajasthani
- Time zone: UTC+5:30 (IST)
- Postal code: 303603
- ISO 3166 code: RJ-IN
- Vehicle registration: RJ 14, RJ 41

Kishangarh Renwal is a city and a municipality, panchayat samiti in Jaipur district in the Rajasthan state of India. State Highway 19A passes through the city.

== Kishangarh Renwal Municipal Board ==
Kishangarh Renwal Municipality of Chairman

Election	Name	Party
1990	Hari Praksh Totala Soni Devi Vaidh Purushotam Datta Pramat	
1995	Shabnam Ali Yogendra Singh Shekhawat Niramla Devi Kumawat	
2000	Kailash Sharma	Indian National Congress
2005	Kanhaiyalal Kumawat Bhanwar Lal Jat Chaukharam Dodwadiya	Bharatiya Janata Party
2010	Mahendra Kumar Dadhich	Bharatiya Janata Party
2015	Suman Kumawat	Bharatiya Janata Party
2020	Amit Kumar Jain	Indian National Congress
2026	Sunita Agarwal	Bharatiya Janata Party

== Foundation ==
The city founder was Chomu Ruler Raja Sri Kishan Singh.

Kishangarh Renwal Nagarpalika Election Results 2026

Ward	Name	Party
1.	Shrawan Kumar Dhayal	Independent
2.	Mamraj Kumawat	Bharatiya Janata Party
3.	Narendra Jangid	Bharatiya Janata Party
4.	Pravin Kumar Jaidiya	Bharatiya Janata Party
5.	Ishak Mohammad Teli	Indian National Congress
6.	Sunil Kumar Verma	Independent
7.	Rudi Devi	Bharatiya Janata Party
8.	Sitaram Kumawat	Bharatiya Janata Party
9.	Manoj Kumar Patodiya	Indian National Congress
10.	Payal Nayak	Indian National Congress
11.	Rohini Devi Sain	Bharatiya Janata Party
12.	Rajendra Jethiwal	Independent
13.	Vijay Kumar Kumawat	Bharatiya Janata Party
14.	Rajeev Tiwari	Independent
15.	Kalyan Mal Dayma	Indian National Congress
16.	Santosh Devi Sharma	Bharatiya Janata Party
17.	Ajay Bari	Independent
18.	Sunita Devi Jogidas	Indian National Congress
19.	Deepmala Sharma	Indian National Congress
20.	Parween Bano	Indian National Congress
21.	Sunita Agarwal	Bharatiya Janata Party
22.	Rubina Bano	Indian Nation Congress
23.	Pinki Kanwar	Bharatiya Janata Party
24.	Chanda Totala	Bharatiya Janata Party
25.	Mamta Devi Raigar	Indian National Congress
26.	Ram Kishor Raigar	Indian National Congress
27.	Madhu Agarwal	Independent
28.	Kaushalya Devi	Bharatiya Janata Party
29.	Sita devi Kumawat	Bharatiya Janata Party
30.	Tarachand Kumawat	Independent
31.	Lalchand Kumawat	Independent
32.	Nitesh Kumawat	Bharatiya Janata Party
33.	Boduram Kumawat	Bharatiya Janata Party
34.	Bhanwar Singh Bajiya	Indian National Congress
35.	Geeta Devi Sepat	Indian National Congress

Kishangarh Renwal Nagarpalika Election Results 2020

Ward	Name	Party
1.	Ganpat Mahala	Indian National Congress
2.	Sagar Mal Kumawat	Bharatiya Janata Party
3.	Anju Devi Kumawat	Bharatiya Janata Party
4.	Kajod Mal Ujjwal	Independent
5.	Ishak Mohammad Teli	Indian National Congress
6.	Santosh Devi	Indian National Congress
7.	Mahendra Verma	Independent
8.	Dharmendra Chaudhary	Indian National Congress
9.	Shakila Bano	Indian National Congress
10.	Chhitar Mal Parewa	Indian National Congress
11.	Pukhraj Parewa	Indian National Congress
12.	Yogendra Singh Shekhawat	Indian National Congress
13.	Gopal Dayma	Indian National Congress
14.	Sitaram Kumawat	Bharatiya Janata Party
15.	Mukesh Kumawat	Bharatiya Janata Party
16.	Rajeev Tiwari	Independent
17.	Nitin Sharma	Bharatiya Janata Party
18.	Shankar Soni	Indian National Congress
19.	Mohammad Shahid	Indian National Congress
20.	Champa Devi Kumawat	Bharatiya Janata Party
21.	Amit Jain	Indian Nation Congress
22.	Suman Bangarwa	Indian Nation Congress
23.	Shahida Bano	Indian National Congress
24.	Mukesh Goyal	Independent
25.	Bhagchand Sain	Independent
26.	Mamta Devi Raigar	Indian National Congress
27.	Kanchan Devi	Indian National Congress
28.	Kanchan Kanwar	Bharatiya Janata Party
29.	Kaushalya Devi	Bharatiya Janata Party
30.	Sitaram Kumawat	Bharatiya Janata Party
31.	Kavita Kumawat	Bharatiya Janata Party
32.	Kajod Mal	Independent
33.	Mahendra Sultaniya	Indian National Congress
34.	Santosh Bajiya	Indian National Congress
35.	Shrawan Dhayal	Independent

Kishangarh Renwal Nagarpalika Election Results 2015

Ward	Name	Party
1.	Pemram Sepat	Bharatiya Janata Party
2.	Uma Kumari	Independent
3.	Sunil Sankhala	Bharatiya Janata Party
4.	Sunita Devi	Indian National Congress
5.	Santara Devi	Independent
6.	Dharmendra Chaudhary	Independent
7.	Shanti Devi	Independent
8.	Aachi Sankhala	Bharatiya Janata Party
9.	Ramavtar Sharma	Bharatiya Janata Party
10.	Sonu Kanwar	Bharatiya Janata Party
11.	Subhash Dayma	Indian National Congress
12.	Suman Kumawat	Bharatiya Janata Party
13.	Sharda Devi	Bharatiya Janata Party
14.	Rajkumar Kumawat	Bharatiya Janata Party
15.	Omprakash Mundotiya	Indian National Congress
16.	Mukesh Goyal	Bharatiya Janata Party
17.	Ramzan Teli	Bharatiya Janata Party
18.	Riyazuddin Kuraishi	Independent
19.	Roshan Kumawat	Indian National Congress
20.	Suman Bangarwa	Independent
21.	Santosh Devi	Bharatiya Janata Party
22.	Suman Devi	Independent
23.	Bhanwarlal Kumawat	Bharatiya Janata Party
24.	Mamta Kumawat	Independent
25.	Santosh Bajiya	Indian National Congress

== Temple ==
The city architecture resembles that of the Pink City Jaipur.

Girdhariji Krishan Bihari ji mandir (Bada mandir)

This temple is situated in middle of the city. follows the rituals of NIMBARK SAMPRADYA. Pujya Shree dr. jugal kishor shran ji maharaj is the main saint as maharaj of the temple. All the festivals are celebrated by thakurji at a huge level. every year shri Janaki vivas (vivah utsav ) also is organized in the month of December.

Shaktipeeth Shri Kullu Wali Mataji Temple, Renwal Dham

This temple is a very miraculous temple. The wishes of the devotees who pray here are fulfilled. Nathuram ji is the chief priest of Shaktipeeth Shri Kullu Wali Mataji Temple. There is Shri Kullu Wali Mataji Mandir Samiti in this temple. Its manager is Jaswant Pujari, Sunil Sankhala, Motiram Sankhala, Shankar Singh Sankhala, Sohanlal Sankhala, Sandeep Sankhala, Hitendra Singh Sankhala, Rajveer Singh Sankhala, Mahadev Prajapat, Girdhari Rajora, Rakesh Prajapat, Dinesh Sharma, Rajendra Swami, Arjun Yogi, Rohit Sankhala, Hemant Sankhala, Siddharth Verma, Mukesh Meena, Akash Dabriya, Ravi Manohar, Vijay Khatanwaliya, Tikam Manohar, Sandeep Khanna are members.

Kisan Shiv Mandir, Kishangarh Renwal

A grand Shivling of Lord Shiva was installed in this temple. This is the largest temple of Lord Shiva in Kishangarh Renwal. This temple has been built by Shri Laxminarayan Kishan (former MLA, Phulera Assembly).

Kamla Sati Mata Mandir, Kishangarh Renwal

This temple is famous by the name of Sati Mata. Here, after the death of her husband, Smt. Kamla Rawat committed Sati with him. After some time, she started showing her miracles to the people of the village. After that, the people of the village built a grand temple of Kamla Sati Mata. Also, a fair is organized every year by the Rawat family of Kamla Sati Mata.

== Demographics ==
As of 2011 India census, Kishangarh Renwal had a population of 3 31321 Kishangarh Renwal has a literacy rate of 75.82%, higher than the national average of 72.99% and lower than the national urban average of 84.11%. Male literacy is 87.96%, and female literacy is 63.14%. 13.9% of the population is under 6 years of age.
