= Jamwa Ramgarh Assembly constituency =

Legislative Assembly constituency in Rajasthan State, India

Coordinates: 27.02°N 76.01°E

Jamwa Ramgarh
- Constituency No. 48 for the Rajasthan Legislative Assembly

Constituency details
- Country: India
- Region: North India
- State: Rajasthan
- District: Jaipur
- Lok Sabha constituency: Jaipur Rural
- Established: 1972
- Total electors: 232,217
- Reservation: ST

Member of Legislative Assembly
- 16th Rajasthan Legislative Assembly
- Incumbent Mahendra Pal Meena
- Party: Bharatiya Janata Party

Jamwa Ramgarh Assembly constituency is one of the 200 Legislative Assembly constituencies of Rajasthan state in India.

It is part of Jaipur district and is reserved for candidates belonging to the Scheduled Tribes. As of 2018, it is represented by Mahendra Pal Meena of the Bharatiya Janata Party.

== Members of the Legislative Assembly ==
Year	Name	Party
2008	Gopal Meena	Indian National Congress
2013	Jagdish Narayan	Bharatiya Janata Party
2018	Gopal Meena	Indian National Congress
2023	Mahendra Pal Meena	Bharatiya Janata Party

== Election results ==
=== 2023 ===
2023 Rajasthan Legislative Assembly election: Jamwa Ramgarh
Party	Candidate	Votes	%	±%
BJP	Mahendra Pal Meena	100,041	55.67	+13.98
INC	Gopal Lal Meena	61,614	34.29	−20.8
Independent	Suman Meena	13,284	7.39	
NOTA	None of the above	1,438	0.8	−0.56
Majority		38,427	21.38	+7.98
Turnout		179,709	77.39	−1.16
BJP gain from INC		Swing		

=== 2018 ===
2018 Rajasthan Legislative Assembly election: Jamwa Ramgarh
Party	Candidate	Votes	%	±%
INC	Gopal Meena	89,165	55.09	
BJP	Mahendra Pal Meena	67,481	41.69	
NOTA	None of the above	2,195	1.36	
Majority		21,684	13.4	
Turnout		161,867	78.55	

== See also ==
- List of constituencies of the Rajasthan Legislative Assembly
- Jaipur district
