= Bairi Sal =

Rawal of Samode, Chief Minister of Jaipur, Regent of Jaipur

Bairi Sal was the Rawal of Samode, Prime Minister of Jaipur from 1818 to 1823 and regent of Jaipur from 1836 until his death in 1838.

== Biography ==
He was the principal signatory representing Jagat Singh, the Maharaja of Jaipur, in the 1818 treaty that established Jaipur as a protectorate of the East India Company. Jagat Singh left no heir at the time of his death in 1818. However, several months later, his wife, Bhatianiji, declared that she was eight months pregnant. To verify the authenticity of the announcement, the principal nobles of Jaipur, led by Bairi Sal, sought confirmation from the senior women of the zenana, who affirmed the pregnancy. When Bhatianiji gave birth to a son, he was recognized as the heir to the throne by both the nobles and the British Government. When Jai Singh III was installed as the Maharaja of Jaipur, David Ochterlony established a regency council with Bhatianiji as its head, while Bairi Sal was appointed as the Prime Minister (Diwan) of Jaipur. During his tenure as Prime Minister, he was caught in the conflict between the Bhatianiji and the East India Company. He attempted to restore the crownlands of Jaipur that had been usurped by certain nobles but he failed. In 1823, Bhatianiji removed him from his position and replaced him with Jhoota Ram. At that time, the British promised to protect him from any retribution from the zenana. After the death of Jai Singh III, the East India Company removed Jhoota Ram from the position of Diwan and reinstated Bairi Sal in the role. Bairi Sal was also appointed head of the council of regency to govern on behalf of Ram Singh II until he came of age. This decision was made without consulting the Rajmata, and the Company refused to correspond with her except through Bairi Sal. He managed the State’s administration effectively, dealt with wrongdoers to restore peace, and successfully secured the remission of the arrears of the State’s tribute from the East India Company. While serving as the Diwan of Jaipur, he equipped the Shekhawati brigade at state expense with 400 muskets and an equal number of pouches and belts.

== Death ==
He died in 1838 and was succeeded by his son, Sheo Singh, as the Rawal of Samode.
