= Jaitpura, Phulera =

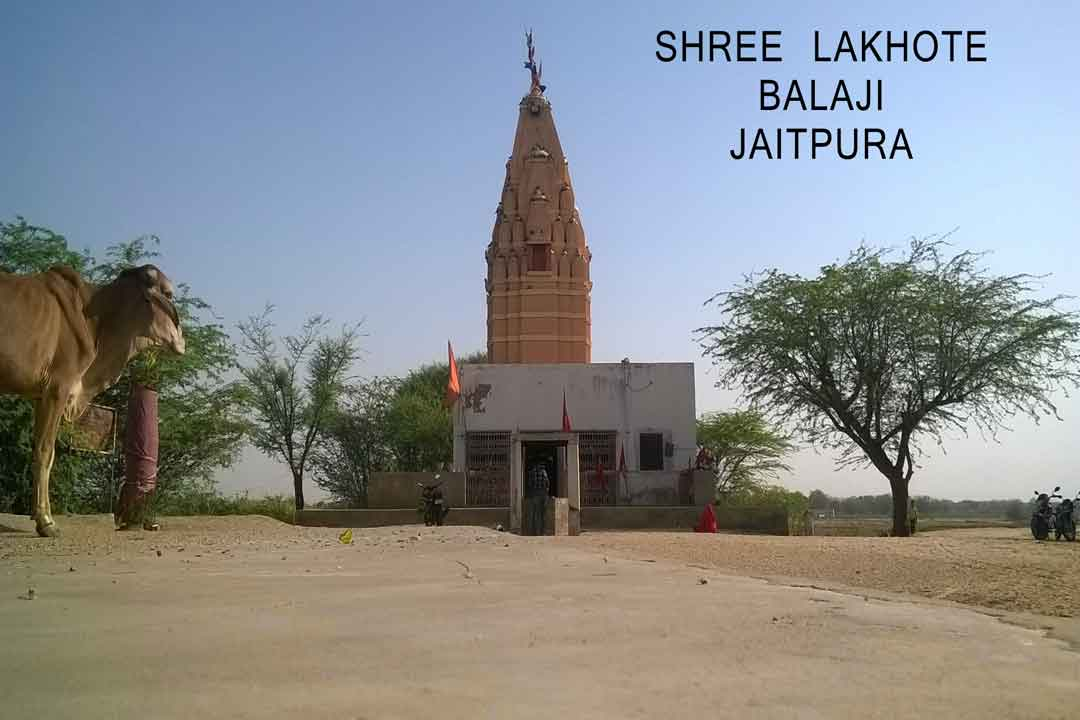
Lakhote Balaji Temple in Jaitpura village

Jaitpura is a village situated in North-East of Phulera Tehsil of Jaipur district in Rajasthan, India. It is 10 km from Phulera, 8 km from Sambhar, 60 km from Jaipur. The village is spread in approx. 18000 Bighas area. Its altitude is 390 metres above MSL. Its Pin-Code is 303604, India.

Schedule Caste (SC) constitutes 11.08% while Schedule Tribe (ST) were 8.85% of total population in Jaitpura village.

In Jaitpura village out of total population, 937 were engaged in work activities. 64.89% of workers describe their work as Main Work (Employment or earning more than 6 months) while 35.11% were involved in Marginal activity providing livelihood for less than 6 months. Of 937 workers engaged in Main Work, 265 were cultivators (owner or co-owner) while 30 were agricultural labourers.

== Transportation connectivity ==
Its nearest Local railway station is Khandel (approx. 3 km), while other nearest bigger railway junction is Phulera which is well connected to nearest bigger cities like Jaipur and Ajmer via express trains. Khandel railway station falls on route from Phulera to Rewari (215 km) which was formed on 18 May 1905.

== Geography, Climate and Natural Resources ==
Jaitpura has a hot semi-arid climate under the Köppen climate classification "BSh", receiving over 650 millimetres (26 in) of rainfall annually but most rains occur in the monsoon months between June and September. Temperatures remain relatively high during summer from April to early July having average daily temperatures of around 30 °C (86 °F). During the monsoon there are frequent, heavy rains and thunderstorms, but flooding is not common. The winter months of November to February are mild and pleasant, with average temperatures ranging from 10–15 °C (50–59 °F) and with little or no humidity and cold waves lead to temperatures near freezing. It is having a big water dam which is the main resource for Ground Water Recharge and irrigation.

== Languages ==
Since, Jaitpura comes under Jaipur (District), its main languages of communication are Rajasthani and Hindi. Most of the people of Jaitpura used to communicate in Dhundhari, that is a local language of Jaipur and SIkar rural area.

== Current development status ==
The main occupation of the villagers is agriculture and domestic factory-farming. Its having 7 schools including Government school facility up to 12th standard (arts subjects). Its having a Government hospital, around 20 temples including Lakhota Balaji, one Jain Mandir and a Mosque too. The people of this village live in brotherhood and help each other. It includes majority of Hindu people but also includes Jain and Muslim religions.

The village has improved a lot in previous couple of years but a lot more improvements are required in the field of Road Connectivity, Better Water Conservation, Better Medical Facilities and Bank Facilities. For last many years the villagers are also moving out of village for earning because due to lack of water conservation and poor irrigation techniques the main source of their income, Agriculture, is getting obsolete. So a lot more improvements are expected in the field of employment so that villagers can earn their life resources in the village itself and be self-dependent and so that the village can stand in the list of developed villages of the nation.

== Places of interest ==
=== Shree Lakhote Balaji ===
Shri Lakhote Mandir is famous Temple of Lord Veer Hanuman in Jaitpura. Its situated in Khalda (~2 km North from Jaitpura). People of Jaitpura and its nearby villages come here for worship mostly on Tuesdays and Saturdays in morning. Large crowds can be seen on the occasions of festivals like Deepawali and Holi. It is the main place of worship in Jaitpura. There is a pond named Bheeva-Sagar on the western side which is filled with water almost all of the year.

=== Jaitpura Bandha ===
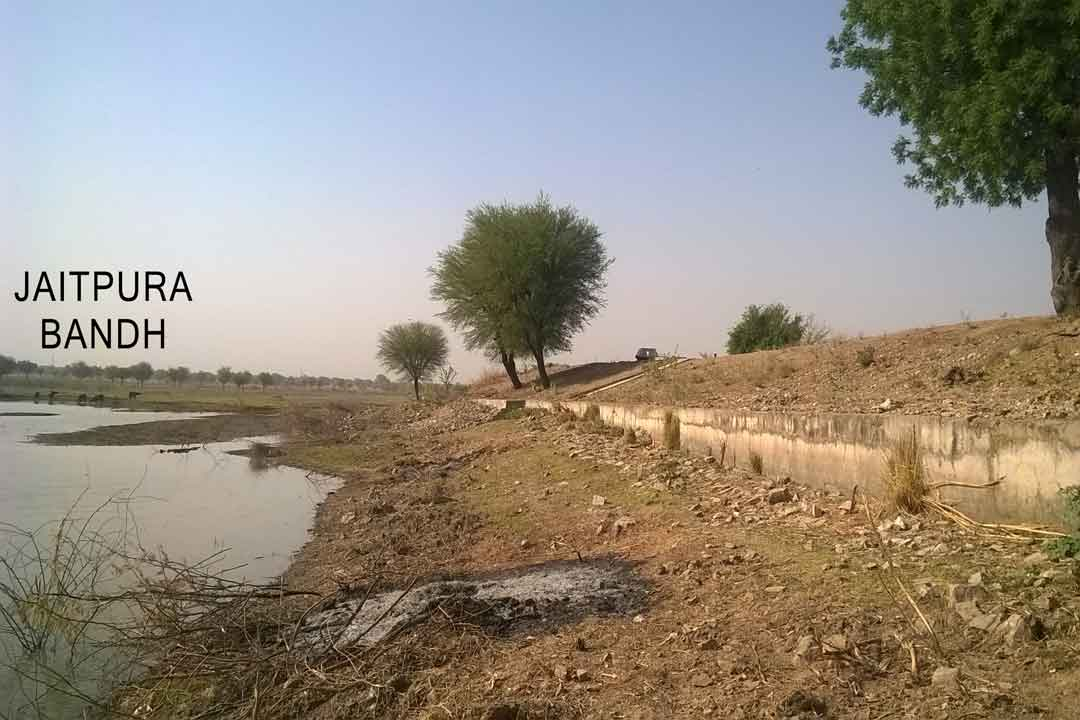
Jaitpura Dam (Rajasthan)

The dam was built in 1871. Its water filling capacity is 1.026 million cubic meters. It is the main resource of ground water recharge in the area. It is also the main source of irrigation in the village and its surroundings. This is normally filled if the monsoon rainfall happens normal. A lot of maintenance is done from time to time to keep the condition of dam good.

=== Gramin Talab ===
It is located in the south of the village. There is a well in the north of this pond which is also main resource for drinking water. The well contains water throughout the year.

=== Shiv and Hanuman Mandir ===
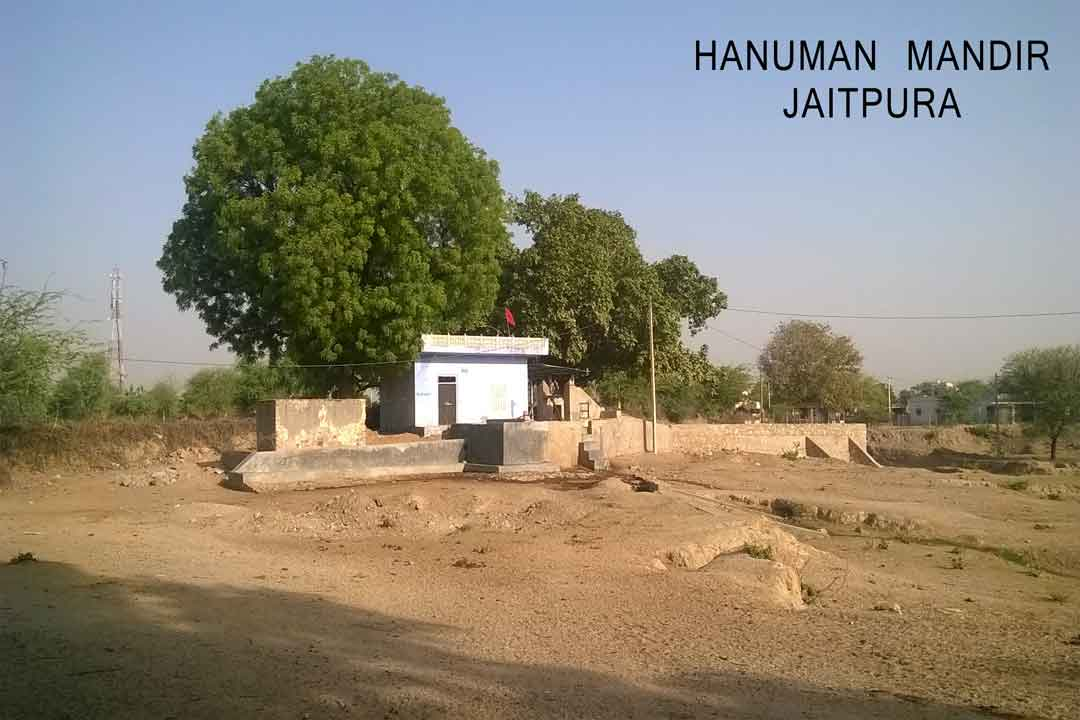
Hanuman and Shiv Mandir: Jaitpura (Phulera)

This temple is one of the oldest temple of the Lord Hanuman Ji and Lord Shiv Ji in Jaitpura, Here is a well from which all villagers drink water. People of the village consider the temple to be miraculous.
