= Tankarda =

- village
- Tankarda
- Location within Rajasthan Location within India
- Coordinates: 27.17°N 75.12°E
- Country: India
- State: Rajasthan
- District: jaipur
- Founder: Not available

Government
  - Type: panchyat
  - Body: Gram Panchayat

Area
  - Total: 7 km^{2} (2.7 sq mi)
- Elevation: 460 m (1,510 ft)

Population (2011)
  - Total: 8,000

Languages
  - Official: Hindi
- Time zone: UTC+5:30 (IST)
- PIN: 303702

Tankarda is a historical town in Chomu Jaipur district of Rajasthan in India.
