= Samode (estate) =

Nathawat Estate in Jaipur

The Estate of Samode was among the oldest and most prominent Jagirs of the Jaipur State.

== History ==
Prithviraj Singh I of Amber had nineteen sons, three of whom succeeded him on the throne in succession. Five died without heirs, while the remaining received various estates as their patrimony. His fourth son, Gopalji, was given the estates of Samode and Mohana. Gopal was appointed as the Patel, or Head of the Jaipur Panchayat, and was granted the first seat on the right-hand side in the durbar, along with command of the vanguard of the army. Gopal was succeeded by his eldest son, Nath, whose descendants are known by the patronymic Nathawat. Nath was succeeded by Manohar Das, who accompanied Man Singh I to Kabul and participated in approximately twenty-two major battles. In recognition of his services, he was granted an additional jagir comprising Hadota. Subsequently, Samode was allotted to his younger brother, Behari Das. Behari Das served the imperial court at Delhi and successfully captured the fort of Ghazni. In recognition of his services on various occasions, he was conferred the title of Raja. He was succeeded by Kushal Singh who was granted the hereditary title of Rawal.

Samode represented the elder branch of the Nathawat clan but frequently contested its supremacy with Chomu, another prominent house of the clan. These disputes often resulted in considerable bloodshed. When Rawal Indar Singh of Samode faced reproach and threats of displeasure from the Jaipur authorities, the chief of Chomu approached the Jaipur authorities and offered a substantial nazrana (transl. Gift) to secure recognition of seniority. Consequently, the authorities decreed that Samode be made khalsa, and Indar Singh was exiled. He went into exile in Marwar and spent his final days in the village of Peeplye, located in Samode, which had been granted for the maintenance of his wife.

Although subordinate to the rulers of Jaipur, the Rawals held considerable authority in Samode. They received fealty from the thakurs during their own durbars. The Rawal of Samode was exempt from paying tribute to Jaipur but rendered military service with cavalry when required. His closest relatives were the jagirdars of Chomu, Renwal, Ajairajpura, Nangal, Udaipurya, and Etawah.

For six successive generations, Samode remained under the control of Kushal Singh's descendants; however, it ultimately reverted to Jaipur. In 1757, Samode was granted to Hamir Singh, the eldest son of Jodh Singh, Thakur of Chomu.

== List of rulers ==
Name	Reign Start	Reign End
Bairi Sal		1838
Sheo Singh	1838	1854
Bijay Singh	1854	1885
Fateh Singh	1885	1905
Sangram Singh	1905	
