= Chaksu =

- Town
- Location in Rajasthan, India Chaksu (India)
- Coordinates: 26.60°N 75.95°E
- Country: India
- State: Rajasthan
- District: Jaipur
- Constituency: Dausa

Government
  - Type: Municipal corporation
  - Body: Nagar Palika
- Elevation: 297 m (974 ft)

Population (2001)
  - Total: 29,111

Languages
  - Official: Hindi
- Time zone: UTC+5:30 (IST)
- Postal code: 303901

Chaksu is a municipality in Jaipur district in the state of Rajasthan, India. The town is situated at a distance of 40 km from Jaipur on National Highway 52. The town is also one of the 13 tehsil headquarters of Jaipur District. Chaksu is also a legislative assembly seat of Rajasthan Vidhan Sabha and the current MLA of Chaksu is Ramavtar Bairwa.

Gujjars, Meenas and Bairwas are the majority caste in Chaksu and nearby villages.

== Connectivity ==
Chaksu connected via road from Kota-Tonk, Jaipur, Phagi-Dudu, Dausa-Lalsot. Jaipur-Mumbai rail route also passing from Chaksu railway station. Nearest airport is Jaipur International Airport – Jaipur just 25 km from Chaksu.

== Demographics ==
As of the 2011 India census, Chaksu tehsil had population of 2,23,634 and Chaksu town had population of 33,432.
