= Govindgarh, Rajasthan =

Govindgarh
- Town
- Location in Rajasthan, India Govindgarh (India)
- Coordinates: 27.244614°N 75.6412124°E
- Country: India
- State: Rajasthan
- District: jaipur

Government
  - Type: Panchayat simiti & Tehsil
- Elevation: 479 m (1,572 ft)

Population (2011)
  - Total: 7,735

languages
  - official: Hindi
- Time zone: UTC+5:30 (IST)
- postal code: 303712
- Vehicle registration: RJ

Govindgarh is a census town in Jaipur district in the Indian state of Rajasthan.

== Geography ==
Govindgarh is located at 27.24°N 75.64°E. It has an average elevation of 373 metres (1223 feet). River Luni originates near Pushkar in two branches, i.e. the Saraswati and the Sabarmati, which join with each other at Govindgarh. From here, the river comes out of Aravali and is known as Luni.

== Demographics ==
Govindgarh is a Census Town city in district of Jaipur, Rajasthan. The Govindgarh Census Town has population of 7,735 of which 3,960 are males while 3,775 are females as per report released by Census India 2011.

The population of children aged 0-6 is 1079 which is 13.95% of total population of Govindgarh (CT). In Govindgarh Census Town, the female sex ratio is 953 against state average of 928. Moreover, the child sex ratio in Govindgarh is around 838 compared to Rajasthan state average of 888. The literacy rate of Govindgarh city is 79.73% higher than the state average of 66.11%. In Govindgarh, male literacy is around 90.42% while the female literacy rate is 68.75%.

Govindgarh Census Town has total administration over 1,331 houses to which it supplies basic amenities like water and sewerage. It is also authorized to build roads within Census Town limits and impose taxes on properties coming under its jurisdiction.

== Transport ==
The town has a railway station north side from Jaipur. This station between Jaipur to ringas B.G line.

== Villages ==
- Tankarda
