= Mauzmabad =

- Town
- Location in Rajasthan, India
- Coordinates: 26.673494°N 75.3601649°E
- Country: India
- State: Rajasthan
- District: Jaipur

Languages
  - Official: Hindi
- Time zone: UTC+5:30 (IST)

Mauzmabad is a town and a municipality in Jaipur district in the state of Rajasthan, India. The town is situated at a distance of 51.5 km from Jaipur on National Highway No. 12 (Jaipur to Kota Section). Town is also one of the 16 tehsil headquarters of Jaipur District.

== Geography ==
The surrounding nearby villages and its distance from Mauzmabad are

- Gangati Kallan 6.4 km
- Gidani 9.2 km
- Sawarda 9.9 km
- Mangalwada 10.0 km
- Jhag 11.4 km
- Raseeli 11.7 km
- Dudu 12.4 km
- Gadota 14.0 km
- Bichoon 14.9 km
- Aakoda 17.2 km
- Sunadiya 17.7 km
- Harsoli 18.9 km
- Ursewa 18.9 km
- Naraina 19.8 km
- Mahalaan 20.3 km
- Ugariyawas 21.0 km
- Gagardoo 22.1 km
- Hirnoda 23.8 km
- Dhinda 24.3 km
- Kachroda 24.9 km
- Dantri 26.0 km
- Asal Pur 26.1 km
- Sakhoon 26.3 km
- Dhani Bhoraj 26.8 km
- Dhandholi 27.2 km
- Bobas 29.4 km
- Sirohikalan
- Sali
- Gahlota
- Korseena
- Marwa
- Sri Ram Pura
- Chain Pura
- Rahalana
- Sardul Pura
- Badoti
- Saanwali
- Biharipura
- Sewa
- Jharna
- Boraj
- Nanan
- Basantgarh
- Dudu
- Chapper
- Jakhed
- Latti
- Chakal. Khudiyala
- Baget
- Gudda Sahayapura
- Kakarala
- Dhamana
- Meerapura

== Language ==
The native language of Mauzmabad is Hindi and most of the village people speak Hindi. Mauzmabad people use Hindi language for communication.

== Time zone ==
Mauzmabad village is located in the UTC 5.30 time zone and it follows Indian standard time(IST). Mauzmabad sun rise time varies 23 minutes from IST. The vehicle driving side in Mauzmabad is left, all vehicles should take left side during driving. Mauzmabad people are using its national currency which is Indian Rupee and its international currency code is INR. Mauzmabad phones and mobiles can be accessed by adding the Indian country dialing code +91 from abroad. Mauzmabad people are following the dd/mm/yyyy date format in day-to-day life. Mauzmabad domain name extension( country code top-level domain (cTLD)) is .in .

== Railway stations ==
The nearest railway station to Mauzmabad is Mokhampura which is located in and around 11.7 kilometer distance. The following table shows other railway stations and its distance from Mamakudi. Mokhampura railway station 11.7 km. Naraina railway station 21.5 km. Hirnoda railway station 23.8 km. Dhinda railway station 24.3 km. Phulera Jn railway station 24.9 km.

== Airports ==
Mauzmabad's nearest airport is Jaipur International Airport situated at 47.4 km distance. Few more airports around Mauzmabad are as follows. Jaipur International Airport 47.4 km. Kota Airport 175.1 km. Jodhpur Airport 234.7 km. Kishagarh Airport 52 km.

== Nearest districts ==
Mauzmabad is located around 51.5 kilometer away from its district headquarter Jaipur. The other nearest district headquarters is padarauna situated at 29.3 km distance from Mauzmabad . Surrounding districts from Mauzmabad are as follows. Tonk ( tonk ) district 69.9 km. Ajmer ( ajmer ) district 75.8 km. Dausa ( dausa ) district 100.3 km. Sikar ( sikar ) district 106.6 km.

== Nearest towns/cities ==
Mauzmabad's nearest town/city/important place is Phulera located at the distance of 23.7 kilometer. Surrounding town/city/TP/CT from Mauzmabad are as follows. Phulera 23.7 km. Bagru 24.9 km. Sambhar 31.3 km. Jobner 33.6 km. Malpura 42.2 km.

== Schools ==
Mauzmabad nearest schools has been listed as follows. Govt Senior Secondary School Mojmabad 0.4 km. Govt Secondary School Lordi 7.4 km. Primary School 10.6 km. Senior Sec School 10.7 km. Girls School 10.8 km.

== Beaches ==
Mauzmabad's nearest beach is Ennore Beach located at the distance of 1582.1 kilometers. Surrounding beaches from Mauzmabad are as follows. Ennore Beach 1582.1 km. Thiruvottiyur Beach 1587.7 km. Marina Beach 1599.4 km. Santhome Beach 1602.3 km. Elliots Beach 1604.4 km.
