= Motilalji Sanghi =

Indian schoolteacher and librarian

- Born: April 25, 1876; Chomu, Rajasthan, India
- Died: January 17, 1949 (aged 72)
- Education: University of Allahabad (dropped out)
- Occupations: Teacher; librarian
- Known for: Founding Sanmati Pustakalaya library

Motilalji Sanghi, also known as Master Motilalji, was an Indian schoolteacher, tutor, and librarian known for founding the Sanmati Pustakalaya public library in Jaipur, Rajasthan. After serving as a schoolteacher for 30 years, he allocated half of his monthly pension to accumulate a collection of books which would serve as the foundation for the Sanmati Pustakalaya. Motilalji personally delivered books to members of the community, supervised their studies, and maintained the library on his own until his death in 1949. Over the course of his librarianship, the library grew from 1,500 to 30,000 volumes. In 1972, Motilalji was memorialized with a bust at the Sanmati Pustakalaya. S. R. Ranganthan prepared a speech for the unveiling which was given posthumously. Motilalji is remembered as having a pioneering role in the public library movement in India.

== Early life and education ==
Motilalji Sanghi was born on April 25, 1876, in the town of Chomu in Jaipur district, Rajasthan. He was married as a child at the age of nine to a wife who was only five. He attended school in Chomu through the sixth grade, the highest level of schooling available in the town, after which he transferred to a high school in Jaipur. In 1897, he matriculated in the University of Allahabad but dropped out in 1899.

== Career ==
After leaving university, Motilalji supported himself by tutoring until 1906. On October 27, 1907, he became the headmaster of the Vernacular Middle School of Jaipur which closed down within the next year. Assistant teacher at Maharaja Collegiate High School. On July 20, 1917, he transferred to another assistant teacher position at Shivapole Middle School. In July 1925, he transferred once again to Chandpole High School where he would continue to teach mathematics until 1937. He retired in November that year, after 30 years of government service, on a monthly pension of ₹20 (Indian rupees).

At his retirement celebration, Motilalji was awarded ₹1100 by his colleagues and students. He donated the entire amount to help pay school fees for poor students.

== Librarianship ==
During his teaching career, Motilalji would allocate ₹10 of his monthly salary towards expanding his small personal library which quickly grew to approximately 1,500 books. With this collection, he founded the Sanmati Pustakalaya library in 1920, a short distance from his house.

Motilalji ran his library as a solo librarian, performing circulation, reference, acquisition, preservation, and custodial tasks by himself, with the only exception of occasional volunteering offered by his students. After concluding his teaching for the day, Motilalji would deliver books from his library to his friends students and collect any books from their homes that were due. He also provided in-home reference service and encouraged his patrons to continue their studies. Outside of his personal circulation service, Motilalji established his library as open to all with no restrictions on the number of books borrowed. He practiced a generalist collection philosophy, with new additions to the collection being restricted only by his budget and by the requests of his patrons. By the end of his life, the library had grown to 30,000 volumes.

== Personal life ==
Motilalji was involved in the Swadeshi movement and preferred simple, locally made clothing. He dressed and ate frugally throughout his life. Motilalji became involved in the larger Indian independence movement after becoming an associate of Pandit Arjun Lal Sethi in 1906.

== Death and legacy ==
Motilalji died on January 17, 1949. After his death, a group of his former students and associates established the Sanmati Pustakalaya Trust, a non-profit organization to continue Motilalji's social service mission. Among other activities, the organization has administered the yearly "Master Motilal Singh Best Librarian Award" nationally since 2008 with the purpose of encouraging public library workers in India. It also organizes the Motilal Memorial Lectures which take place throughout the year in Jaipur, Rajasthan.

In 1972, a bust of Motilalji was unveiled at the Sanmati Pustakalaya library. S. R. Ranganathan had recorded a speech to be given at the unveiling ceremony which was transcribed only a few weeks before his death. In 1973, the Sanmati Pustakalaya trust published a festschrift in Motilalji's honor.

Motilalji is recognized as having played a leading role in the library movement in India.
