= Sambhar Lake Town =

Town in Rajasthan, India

- town
- Location in Rajasthan, India Sambhar Lake Town (India)
- Coordinates: 26°54′37″N 75°11′09″E
- Country: India
- State: Rajasthan
- District: Jaipur

Government
  - Type: Municipality
  - Body: Sub Divisional Magistrate
- Elevation: 367 m (1,204 ft)

Population (2011)
  - Total: 22,327

Languages
- Time zone: UTC+5:30 (IST)
- Postal code: 303604
- ISO 3166 code: RJ-IN
- Vehicle registration: RJ-

Sambhar (officially known as Sambhar Lake Town) is a town and a municipality in Jaipur district in the Indian state of Rajasthan. It is surrounded by the Sambhar Salt Lake. Sambhar is approximately 70 km from Jaipur (NH-8, RJ SH 57) and 99 km from Ajmer.

== Description ==
Sambhar is known for the Sambhar Salt Lake, which is the largest inland salt lake in India. It derives its name from Shakambhari Devi, Goddess of the Chauhan clan, whose 2500-year-old temple is located 28 km from the town.

The Indian epic Mahabharata and Puranas mentions Sambhar Lake as a part of the kingdom of the demon king Vrishparva, as the place where his priest Shukra Charya lived, and as the place where the wedding between his daughter, Devayani, and King Yayati took place. A temple near the lake is dedicated to Devayani with a pond in it.

Mariam-uz-Zamani, daughter of Raja Bharmal of Amber, was married to Akbar on February 6, 1562, at Sambhar.

Sambhar Lake has an archeological site at Naliasar lake dating 2000 BC. A small hamlet has been found while the excavation of the site, which gives an insight into the construction of homes, water well and food grain storage, various coins of different dynasties. A lot is still buried below the sand dunes. Devyani Sarovar and surrounding temples are other places adjoining Sambhar Lake of Indian mythological connection.

Sambhar was the capital of the Chahamanas of Shakambhari before the 12th century.

In 2014, six PSUs including Bharat Heavy Electricals Limited and Power Grid Corporation of India Ltd had planned to set up World’s largest 4,000 MW Ultra-mega Solar power project in the land under the company.

But after the BJP government came to power in the state, the project was scrapped citing environmental issues and shifted to Gujarat.

Sambhar hosts a variety of avian species. Popular species of birds sighted here are coots, black-winged stilts and redshanks. During the monsoon season, a huge number of Siberian pink flamingos carpet the Sambhar Salt Lake making it wonderfully pinkish.

== Demographics ==
As of 2011 Census, Sambhar had a population of 22,327 of which 52% are males and 48% are females . Sambhar has an average literacy rate of 79%, higher than the state average of 66%.

== In popular culture ==
- For the film Delhi-6 directed by Rakeysh Omprakash Mehra, production designer Samir Chanda, recreated inner lanes of Old Delhi at Sambhar . Later for certain scenes, historic Jama Masjid was digitally added to the frame as a backdrop. Various scenes of many other popular films have been shot in lake and main Sambhar town such as:
- Bard of Blood
- PK (film)
- Highway (2014 Hindi film)
- Super 30 (film)
- Jodhaa Akbar
- Goliyon Ki Raasleela Ram-Leela
- Drona (2008 film)
- Zila Ghaziabad
- Gulaal (film)
- Veer (2010 film)
- Tevar

== See also ==
- List of dams and reservoirs in India
- List of lakes in India
- List of Ramsar sites in India
