= General Assembly (disambiguation) =

General assembly is a meeting of all members of an organization.

General Assembly may also refer to:

- General Assembly of Bangladesh
- General Assembly (horse) (1976–2005), an American Thoroughbred racehorse
- General Assembly (school), a private, international school focusing on computer programming.
- The General Assembly (directors), a music video and commercial directing duo based in Los Angeles, US
