= Gopal Meena =

Indian politician

Member of Rajasthan Legislative Assembly
- In office 2018–2023
- Constituency: Jamwa Ramgarh

Personal details
- Born: 16 June 1974 (age 51) Chhaparwas, Jamuaramgarh
- Party: Indian National Congress
- Spouse: Meenaxi Meena
- Parent: Ganga Ram Meena (father)

Gopal Meena (born 16 June 1974) is a politician of Rajasthan. He is a member of the Indian National Congress party.

Gopal Meena was Member of the Legislative Assembly in the Rajasthan Legislative Assembly from the Jamwa Ramgarh constituency in 13th Legislative Assembly of Rajasthan.

He is also member of the legislative assembly from Jamwa Ramgarh constituency in 15th legislative assembly Rajasthan.
