= Naliasar =

- village
- Country: India
- State: Rajasthan

Languages
  - Official: Hindi
- Time zone: UTC+5:30 (IST)

Naliasar is an ancient town located 6 km from Sambhar in Rajasthan state in India.

Remains of several buildings and other antiquities such as coins, pottery, terracotta and shell objects have been discovered on the site. The excavations exposed six layers of occupation.
