= Paota =

Scientific classification
- Kingdom: Animalia
- Phylum: Arthropoda
- Class: Insecta
- Order: Lepidoptera
- Family: Geometridae
- Genus: Paota; Hulst, 1896
- Species: P. fultaria

Binomial name
- Paota fultaria (Grote, 1882)

Genus of moths

Paota is a monotypic moth genus in the family Geometridae described by George Duryea Hulst in 1896. Its only species, Paota fultaria, was first described by Augustus Radcliffe Grote in 1882. It is found in North America and has a forewing length of 12 millimetres.

The MONA or Hodges number for Paota fultaria is 7127.
