= Jagat Singh of Amber =

Maharaja of Jaipur (1786–1818)

Jagat Singh II
- Maharaja Sawai of Amber
- Reign: 3 August 1803 – 21 November 1818
- Predecessor: Pratap Singh
- Successor: Jai Singh III
- Born: c. 1786
- Died: 21 November 1818 (aged 31–32)
- Spouse: 22 queens and 24 concubines
- Issue: Jai Singh III
- Religion: Hinduism

Jagat Singh (c. 1786 – 21 November 1818) was the Maharaja of Amber and Jaipur. He was a son of Pratap Singh, Raja of Jaipur.

== Biography ==
Maharaja Sawai Jagat Singh ascended to the throne of Jaipur on 3 August 1803 at the age of 17. The early years of his reign were comparatively free from Maratha and Mughal inroads but a dispute with Marwar (Jodhpur) on a point of honor brought the two states, which had worked closely during Maharaja Pratap Singh's time, into confrontation, which however ended in peace and a matrimonial alliance. An important event at the commencement of his reign was the signing of an offensive and defensive alliance on 12 December, 1803 with the British. This treaty was likely to free Jaipur from Maratha depredations, but after Lord Wellesley's departure, it was annulled by the Governor General, George Barlow who was an advocate of the policy of non-interference. As a result of this, territories of the state were depredated by the Maratha's and Amir Khan Pindari till the signing of the historic treaty of 1818 ‘defensive alliance, perpetual friendship, protection and subordinate cooperation’ with the British. Barely nine months later Sawai Jagat Singh died at the young age of 32.

== Arts and culture ==
Like his father, Sawai Jagat Singh was also a patron of the arts and crafts. He was very much interested in sports as well as in literature. All the Karkhanas that have been thriving for long in Jaipur and came down to him as heritage were bursting with activities. Many Painters prospered in the Suratkhana, a number of paintings depicting Durbar scenes and Zenana Majlis were painted. Painter Sahib Ram painted a life size portrait of him. The latest group of artists, who were the direct descendants of the Ustads (master artists), were trying their best to keep alive the old tradition, despite new equipment entering Jaipur, producing photographs and other modern improvements in the field of drawing and painting.

== Marriages ==
Jagat Singh had 22 Rajput queens. He also had many concubines, including his favourite Ras Kapur, a Muslim dancing girl, whom he raised to a high status at par to his wives. During his reign, she acquired a notable degree of personal and political influence, which generated opposition among the Rajput nobility. After his death, she was stripped of authority and imprisoned in Nahargarh Fort, where she eventually died under mysterious circumstances.
