= Ram Singh II =

Maharaja of Jaipur (1833–1880)

Maharaja Sawai Ram Singh II
- Maharaja Sawai of Jaipur
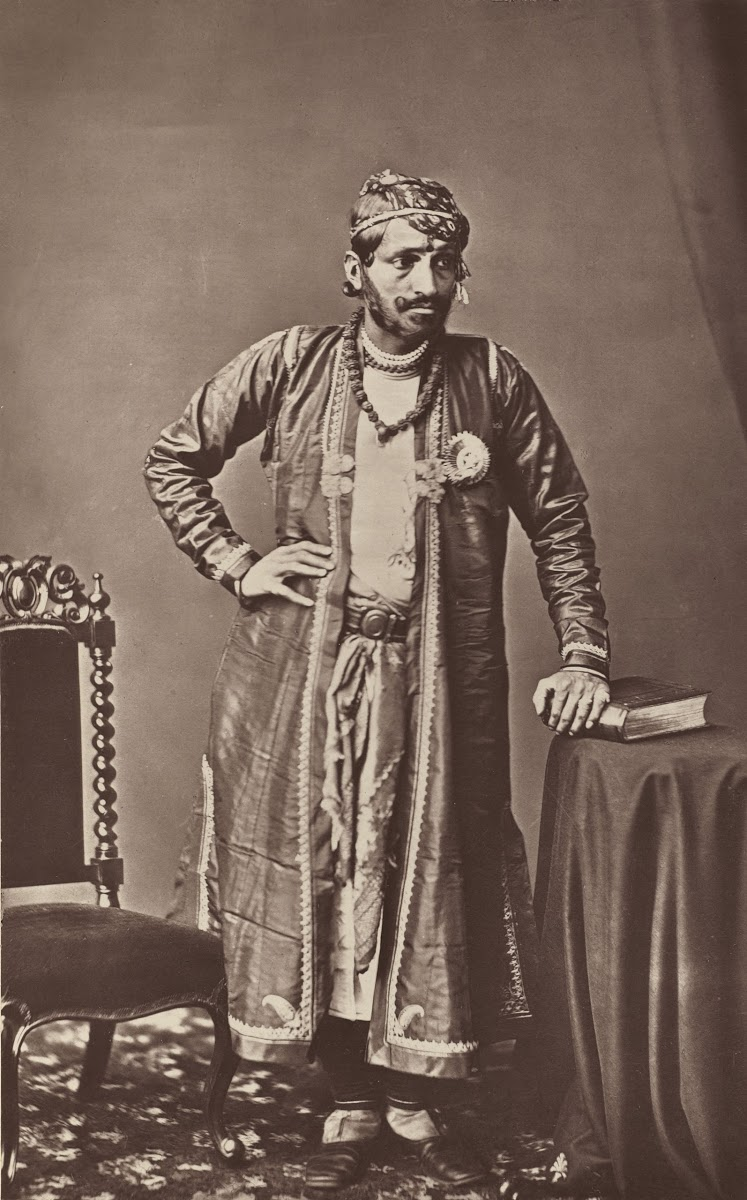
- The Maharaja in 1877

Maharaja of Jaipur
- Reign: 6 February 1835 – 10 August 1880
- Predecessor: Jai Singh III
- Successor: Madho Singh II
- Born: 28 September 1833; Jaipur, Jaipur State, Rajputana
- Died: 10 August 1881 (aged 47)
- Spouse: Rathorji Chand Kanwarji of Jodhpur Rathorji Indra Kanwarji of Jodhpur Rathorji Lal Kanwarji of Jodhpur Rathorji Kesar Kanwarji of Ahmadnagar-Idar Bagheliji Janak Kanwarji of Rewa in Baghelkhand Bagheliji Krishna Kanwarji of Rewa in Baghelkhand Bagheliji Suraj Kanwarji of Rewa in Baghelkhand Sisodiniji Roop Kanwarji of Karansar in Jaipur Bhatiyaniji Mrig Kanwarji of Gadiyala in Bikaner Bhatiyaniji Kishan Kanwarji of Madhogarh in Jaipur
- Issue: No issue
- House: Kachhwaha
- Father: Jai Singh III
- Mother: Chandrawatji (Sisodiniji) d.of Rao Lakshman Singh of Sheopur in Jaipur

Maharaja Sawai Ram Singh II (28 September 1833 – 17 September 1880) was the Kachwaha ruler of Jaipur from 1835 until 1880, succeeding after the death of Sawai Jai Singh III. He became the ruler of Jaipur at the age of 16 months after his father's death. During his reign, he implemented various reforms, influenced by Western ideals and British preferences. He established new departments, reorganized the police force, and constructed roads to promote economic progress. Additionally, he aimed to transform Jaipur into a modern city, introducing schools, colleges, gas lights, and piped water supply. Ram Singh also focused on women's education, building schools and hospitals for their empowerment. Ram Singh was also an avid photographer. His reign marked a period of significant transformation and progress in Jaipur.

== Reign ==
Ram Singh ascended the throne of Jaipur in 1835 after the death of his father Jai Singh III. He was 16 months old at the time of accession. Initially, a regent was appointed to him. The regency continued for 16 years until he turned 18.

He is generally considered as a pro-reforms ruler, who was influenced by Western ideals. However, Rober Stern argues that much of his pro-reform stances derived from a tendency to acquiesce to British preferences in exchange for titles and honors, thus ensuring his seat of power.

Between 1854 and 1855, the dewan and bakshi were given charge of revenue and army respectively. Subsequently, the duties of the prime minister lightened. During this period, Ram Singh established four new departments – education, police, medical, and survey and settlement. In 1856, he built his own private secretariat. The kingdom was divided into five districts. Each district had a separate magistrate, judge, collector and police chief. In 1867, Ram Singh founded a Royal Council which consisted of eight members. To prevent any corrupt practices, two to three ministers were given charge of each portfolio.

Ram Singh reorganized the police department of his state. The police departments consisted of two separate units – rural police and general police. While the rural police consisted of chowkidars (night watchmen) and sepoys, the general police was directly under the control of the respective minister. Previously criminals were imprisoned within the fort. Ram Singh built the Jaipur Central Jail in 1854 where the prisoners were kept.

According to Jadunath Sarkar, the greatest contribution of Ram Singh was "to the cause of economic progress was the construction of metalled and bridged roads, with good staging bungalows at intervals". These bungalows were necessary for road travel. He built 127 miles (204 km) of the Agra–Ajmer road. The road connected the western and the eastern parts of his kingdom and his capital Jaipur was located at the road's midway. He also built the 48 miles (77 km) long Jaipur–Tonk road. The Karauli to Mandawar road built by him became an important route of trade.

Ram Singh wanted to convert the city of Jaipur into a "second Calcutta" (capital of British India). He built modern schools, colleges and gas lights in streets of Jaipur. Piped water supply was also introduced. He built the Ram Niwas Garden after being inspired by the Eden Gardens of Kolkata. He built the Jaipur Zoological Gardens as a counterpart to the Alipore Zoological Garden. The Calcutta Medical College found its Jaipuri counterpart in Mayo Hospital. He also constructed the Maharaja School for Girls in 1867 for the cause of women's education.

== Personal life ==
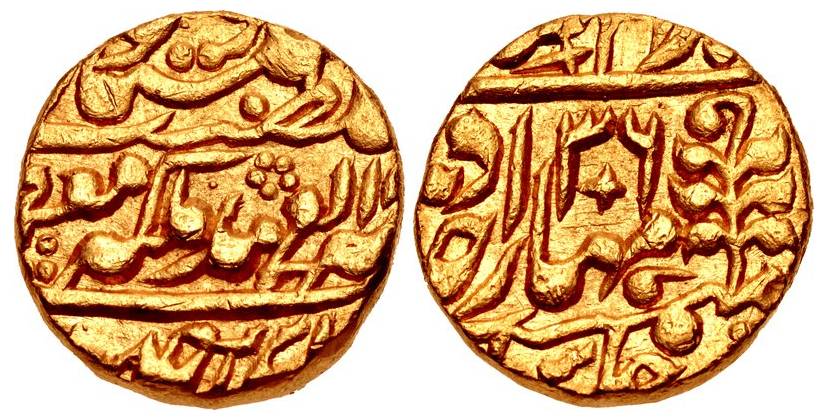
Coinage of Jaipur under Ram Singh. In the name of Victoria, Queen of Great Britain and Empress of India. Sawai Jaipur mint.

Shivdeen Pandit was guardian of Ram Singh during crucial years of his life. In 1853, Ram Singh initially chose as his first wife the daughter of the Maharaja of Rewa, in spite of the custom that required him to marry the daughter of the Maharaja of Jodhpur as first wife. Under pressure from the British, he changed his mind while on the way to Rewa, and first married Rathorji Chand Kanwarji (b.1841), eldest daughter of Maharaja Takht Singh of Jodhpur, in addition to his two other daughters namely — Rathorji Indra Kanwarji (b.1850) and Lal Kanwarji, & a daughter of his deceased brother Prithvi Singh of Ahmadnagar near Idar her name was Rathorji Kesar Kanwarji, then taking Bagheliji Janak Kanwar daughter of Maharaja Bandhvesh Vishvanath Singh Ju Dev of Rewa as his fifth queen. Ram Singh married 10 times in total.

Ram Singh had no issue. He appointed Madho Singh II, the second son of the thakur of Isardha as his heir. On 17 September 1880, Ram Singh died. Madho Singh II also had no issue and appointed Man Singh II as his heir.

== Photography ==
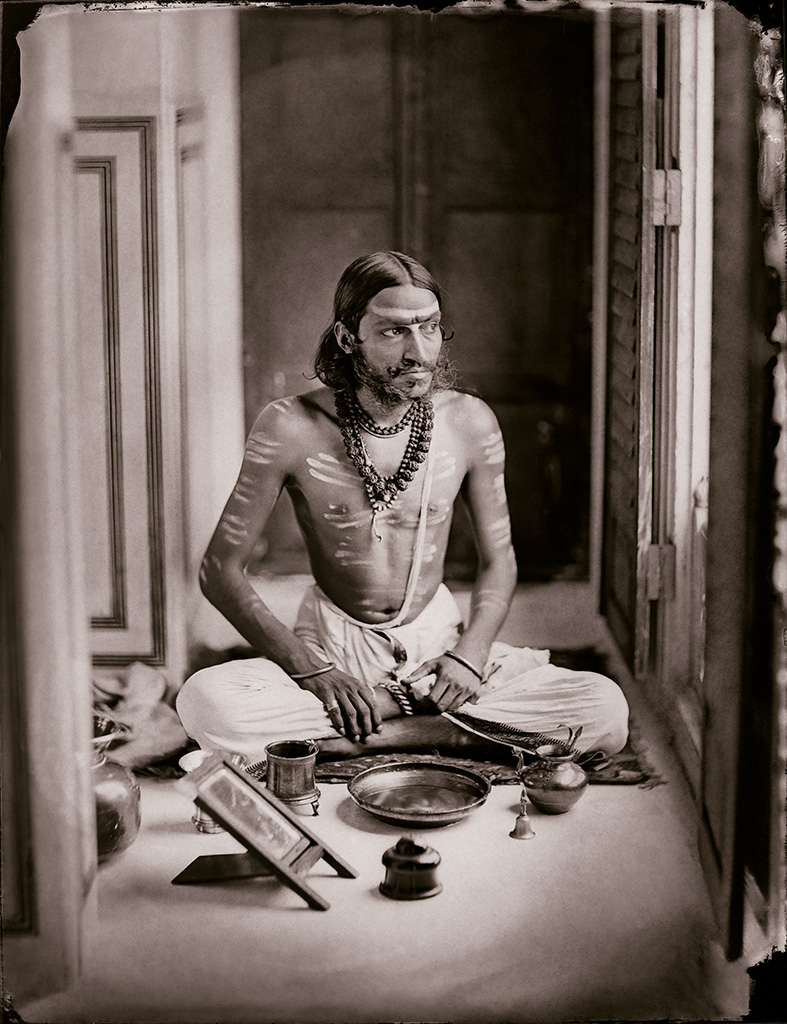
Self-portrait as a Shaivite, c. 1870

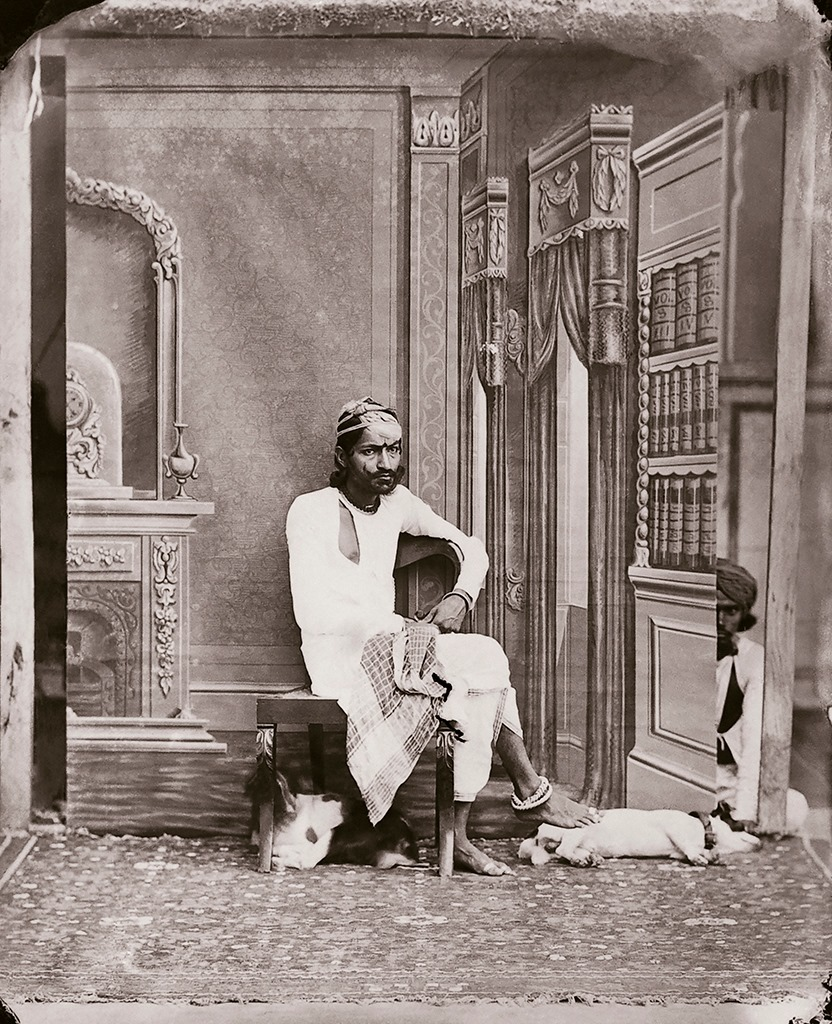
Self portrait with dogs, c. 1870

Ram Singh was passionate about art and photography; he captured (and developed) numerous photographs of women, junior functionaries (like tailors) and nobles of his court. It is believed that Ram Singh was introduced to a camera in 1864 when photographer T. Murray visited Jaipur. After learning how to photograph, he used to carry his camera on all his trips. When western visitors came to his court, he used to learn photography from them.

Many of the photographs taken by him were of elite women who so-far lived an entirely secluded private life in the zenanas of his palace; captured in a western artificial setting, consisting of elegant backdrops, Victorian furniture and Persian carpets. It has been since considered as a pioneer effort at portraying Rajput women behind the purdah. Prior to Ram Singh's photographs, portraits of specific Rajput women were nearly unknown and artists mass-produced idealized representations of women based on a single model, to serve a variety of occasions, for centuries. Interestingly, the names of the photographed women were not mentioned and whether the Maharanis allowed themselves to be photographed is unknown.

Laura Weinstein, an acclaimed art curator argues that the photographs served as an important tool to engage in the widespread discourse about Indian women behind the purdah and they stood out as a rare group of photographs that did not mirror oriental conceptions of Indian domestic life. By appropriating the very European model of portrait photography – which emphasized the dignity and propriety of women, he infused dignity into the life of his photograph-figures unlike other concurrent attempts and refuted the colonial notion of the zenana-inhabitants being idle, unhygienic, superstitious, sexually deviant and oppressed. Rather than reforming the purdah system or associated woman issues, his photographs were modern tools that staunchly defended the tradition, much more than it breached, by portraying an apparent normalcy.

Ram Singh had also commissioned numerous self-portraits in a variety of poses ranging from a Hindu holy man to a Rajput warrior to a Western gentleman. Vikramaditya Prakash, an art-historian had described them as "self-consciously hybridized representations [which] straddle and contest the separating boundary – between colonizer and colonized, English and native – the preservation and reaffirmation of which was crucial for colonial discourse".

The glass negatives that produced the portraits, the albumen print photograph collection and his own self-portraits are now displayed at the Maharaja Sawai Man Singh II Museum in Jaipur. He was also a life-time member of Bengal Photographic Society.

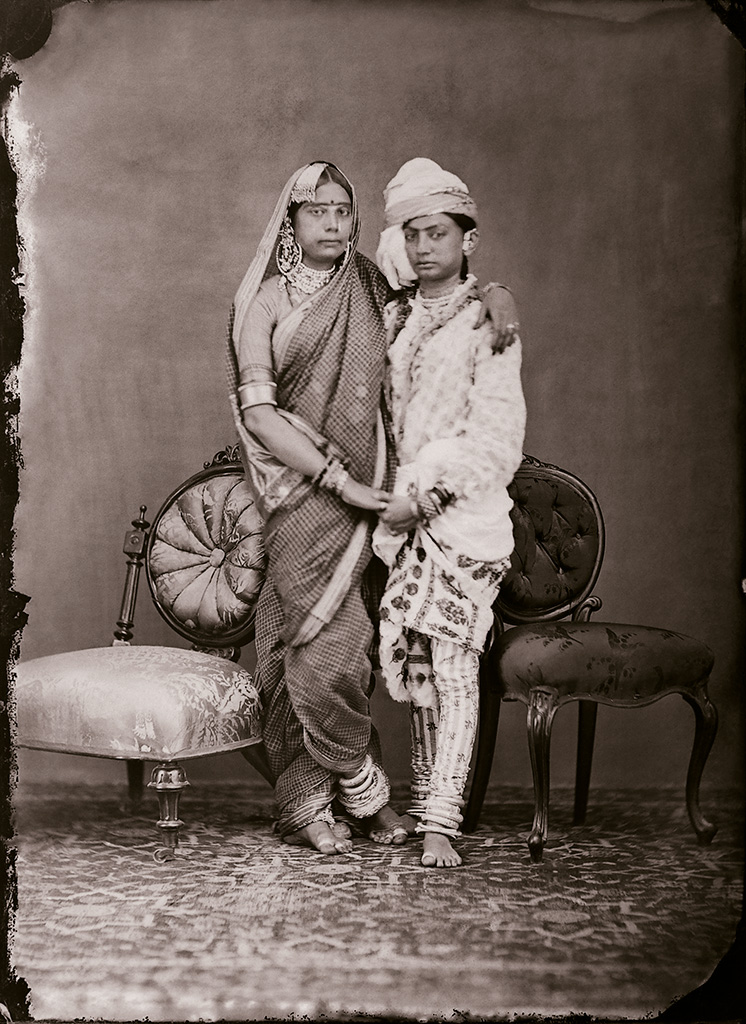
Unidentified women of the zenana

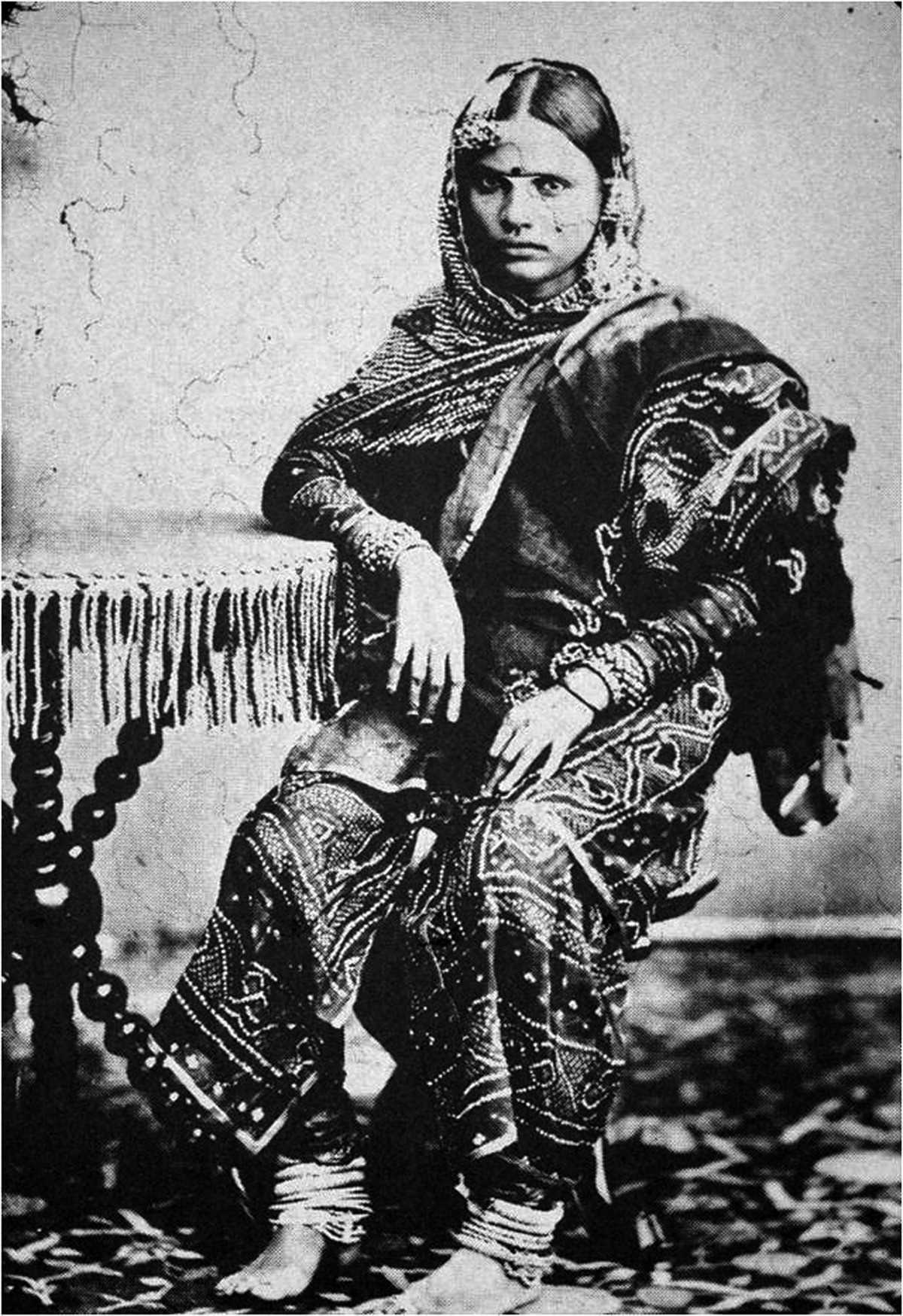
Untitled portrait of a ‘pardayat’

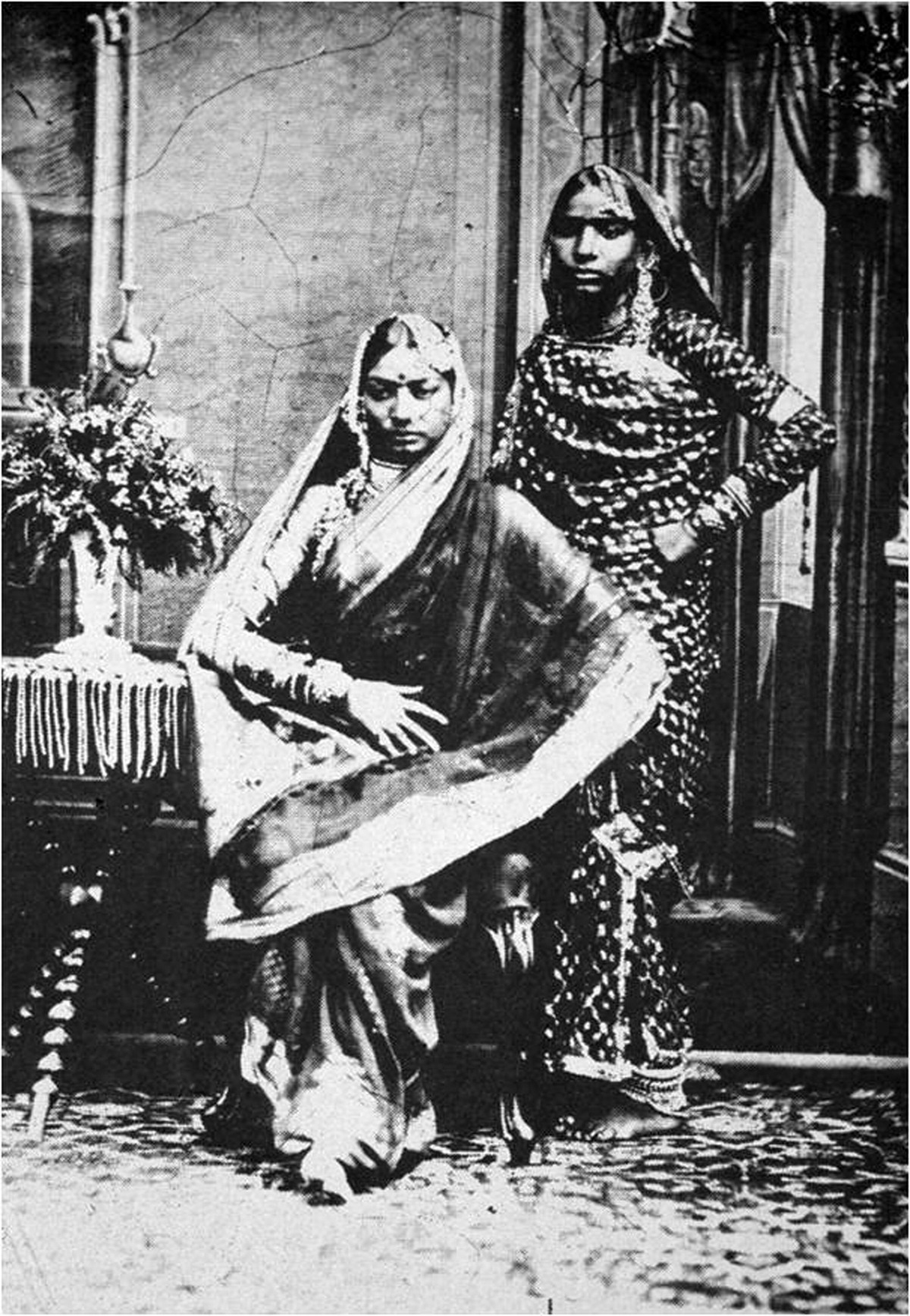
Untitled portrait of a ‘pāswan' and her ‘sakhi'

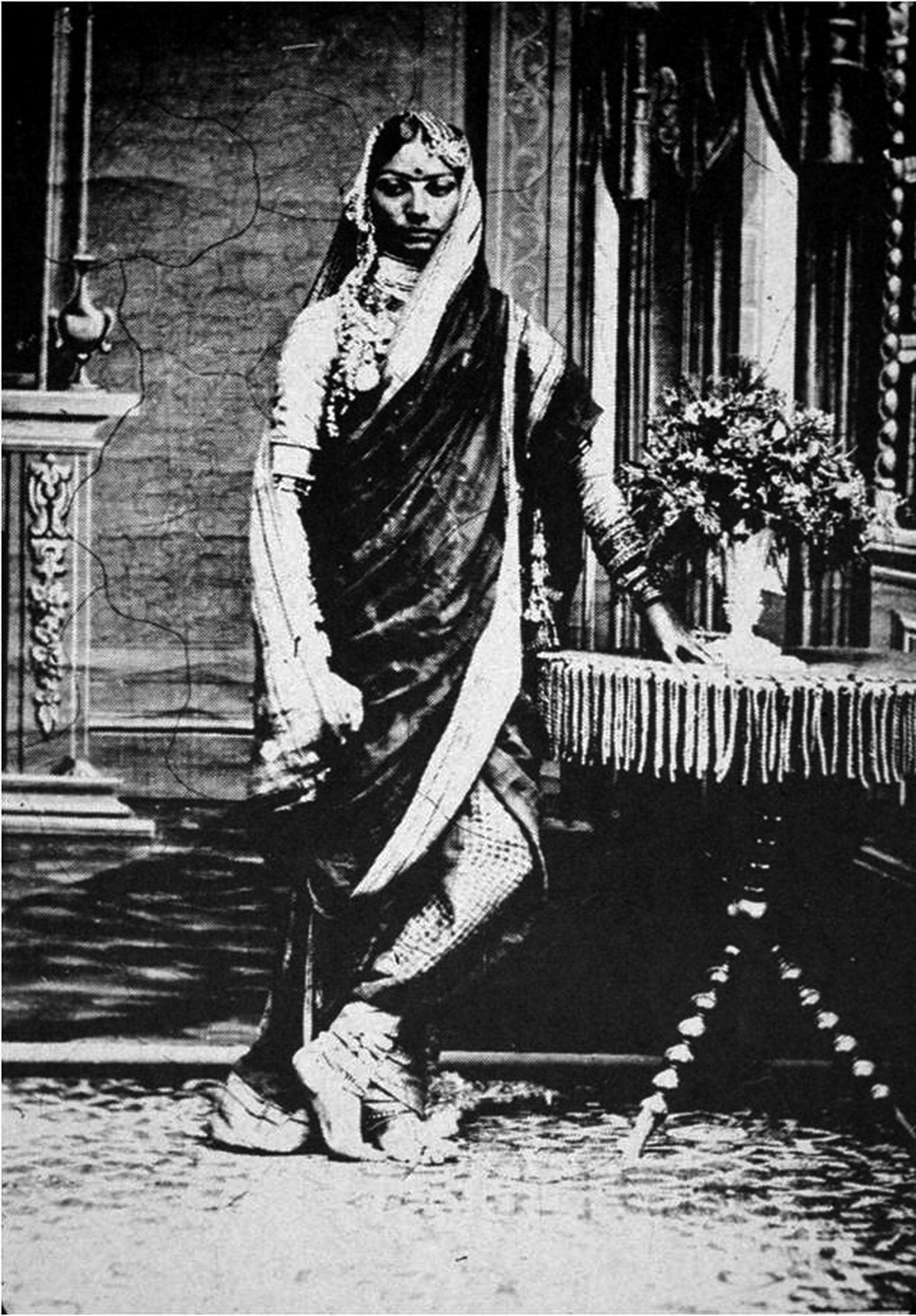
Untitled portrait of a ‘pāswan'

== Bibliography ==
- Bose, Melia Belli (2015). Royal Umbrellas of Stone: Memory, Politics, and Public Identity in Rajput Funerary Art. Brill. ISBN 9789004300569.
- Geneaology Records of Bard/Badwaji Rao Shankar Singhji Jaisawat Lalsot District Dausa Rajasthan contact no.9414650215.
- "VANSHAVALI" (Genealogy of the rulers of Amber and Jaipur) by Harnath Singh Dhundlod edited by Ranbir Sinh Dhundlod
- Sarkar, Jadunath (1994). A History of Jaipur: C. 1503 – 1938. Orient Blackswan. ISBN 9788125003335.
