= Chomu =

Chomu Noshi
- Town
- Chomu, Jaipur, Rajasthan Assembly Map

- Location in Rajasthan, India Chomu (India)
- Coordinates: 27.17°N 75.72°E
- Country: India
- State: Rajasthan
- District: Jaipur
- Established: 26 April 1595
- Founder: Thankur Karan Singh

Government
  - Body: Municipality of Chomu
  - M.L.A.: Dr.Shikha Meel Barala(Congress)

Population (census 2011)
  - Total: 64,417

Languages
  - Official: Dhundhari, Rajasthani, Hindi
- Time zone: UTC+5:30 (IST)
- Postal code: 303702
- ISO 3166 code: RJ-IN
- Vehicle registration: RJ 41

Chomu is a town and municipality, near the city of Jaipur in Jaipur district in the state of Rajasthan, India. From Chomu, Jaipur is 33 km south, Reengus (in Sri Madhopur tehsil) is 33 km northwest Chomu, Mundru village 29 km east.

== Etymology ==
Chomu comes from sanskrit language, chau meaning four, mouh meaning mouth or way.

== History ==
Chomu was established on Akshiya Tritiya in 1595, by Raaval Thakur Karan Singh. The design of the town was proposed by Pandit Beniprasad Bhaatara. According to local historian Vaidh Kailashnath Shastri, Thakur Manohardas and Lakkhi Banjara, laid the foundation of the baavli near the Surajpol Gate at the eastern entrance, and its construction was completed in 1640. Later, Thakur Karan Singh's grandson, Thakur Mohan Singh began the construction city walls and canal, which were completed in 1719. An annual festival is held every year on 26 April in honour of the founders and of the town.

== Administration ==
Chomu is one of the 13 sub-districts in Jaipur and it consists of 3 blocks and covers nearly 80 villages. Chomu has its own municipality and 37 wards.

== Demographics ==
Chomu town is divided into 30 wards for which elections are held every five years.

As of 2011, the town has a population of 64617 of which 33,850 are males while 30,567 are females. The town has an average literacy rate of 79.35%, higher than the national average of 74.04% and State average of 66.11%; with male literacy of 90.19% and female literacy of 67.62%. 13.93% of the population is under 6 years of age.

== Notable people ==
- Motilalji Sanghi (1876-1949), pioneer of the public library movement in India.

== See also ==
- Tourism in Rajasthan
