= Jamwa Ramgarh =

- Town
- Location in Rajasthan, India
- Coordinates: 27.020672°N 76.011003°E
- Country: India
- State: Rajasthan
- District: Jaipur

Government
  - MLA: Mahendra Pal MEENA, BJP

Population (2011)
  - Total: 250,132

Languages
  - Official: Hindi
- Time zone: UTC+5:30 (IST)
- PIN: 303109
- Telephone code: 01426

Jamwa Ramgarh also popularly known as the Ramgarh, is a subdivision of the Jaipur district in Rajasthan, India. It is located on State Highway 55, about 28 kilometres (17 mi) East-North of Jaipur city. It was best known for Ramgarh Lake which is now dry.

== Ramgarh Lake ==
Ramgarh Lake was an artificial lake situated near Jamwa Ramgarh in Rajasthan, India. At one time the lake was the main source of water supply to Jaipur city. The last time the lake received water was 1999 and it has been dry since 2000. It is situated 32 kilometres (20 mi) from Jaipur and when full covered an area of 15.5 square kilometres (6.0 sq mi).

== History ==
Ramgarh was previously known as Manchi, named after Raja Rao Maanchdev Sihra(Meena).Town was established around 3rd Century AD. It was won over by Kachhwaha Rajputs from Meenas in 1038 AD during their quest of Dhundhar. They renamed it Ramgarh and built temple of their kul devi Jamway Mata. That is why it is called Jamwa Ramgarh

== Rulers Before Rajputs ==
- Rao Haripal
- Somosawat
- Rao Maanchdev (Established Maanch Town)
- Rao Jagpal
- Rao Sigoji (Established Dant Mata Temple around 295 AD)
- Bhopal Rao
- Mahapal Rao
- Rao Devpal Singh
- Rao Kishanpal Singh
- Rao Haripal Singh
- Rao Surpal Singh
- Rao Sompal Singh
- Rao Vijaypal Singh
- Rao Karanpal Singh
- Rao Lakhan Singh
- Narbad Rao
- Karan Rao
- Bhano Rao
- Saago Rao
- Rao Jaymal Singh
- Rao Kishan Singh
- Kesho Rao
- Chondo Rao
- Rao Asdev
- Kilhan Rao
- Rao Aspal (established Thakurji Temple Around 960 AD)
- Rao Nathu Singh Sihra
- Rao Maida Sihara

== Education ==
First government school esthablished by Seth Mangilal Ji Maharwal, and the committee members were Seth Ramdayal Ji Maharwal, Seth Ramdhan Ji Maharwal, Master Rameshwar Ji Tiwari, Master Harsahay Ji Sharma, Seth Satnarayan Ji Maharwal, Seth Harinarayan Ji Maharwal, Patwari Shri Ganaga Sahay, Shrimati Mangi bai Sharma, Master Lakshaman Prasad Ji Lakhera.

== Geography ==
The major rivers passing through the Jaipur district is Banganga. Although serious drought is rare, poor water management and exploitation of groundwater with extensive tube-well systems threatens agriculture in some areas.

== Climate ==
Jaipur has a hot semi-arid climate (Köppen climate classification BSh) receiving over 650 millimetres (26 in) of rainfall annually but most rains occur in the monsoon months between June and September. Temperatures remain relatively high throughout the year, with the summer months of April to early July having average daily temperatures of around 30 °C (86 °F). During the monsoon there are frequent, heavy rains and thunderstorms, but flooding is not common. The winter months of November to February are mild and pleasant, with average temperatures ranging from 15–18 °C (59–64 °F) and with little or no humidity. There are however occasional cold waves that lead to temperatures near freezing.

== Media ==
Newspapers available in all parts of Jamwa Ramgarh include Hindi dailies such as Rajasthan Patrika, Dainik Bhaskar, Daily News, Dainik Nav Jyoty, Rastradoot, News Flash TV, Times Of India, DNA, HT, and Chaukadi News.

== List of Villages ==
Under Jamwa Ramgarh subdistrict there total are 233 villages. The largest are Andhi, Anoppura, Basna, Behlor, Bhan Pur Kalan, Bhawani, Bilod, Birasana, Bishanpura, Bobari, Booj, Chawandiya, Chawand ka mand, Dangarwada, Dhamsya, Dharmaliyo ki dhani kooda, Dhaula, Dhoolaraoji, Gathwari, Gopal Garh Indragarh, Jaichandpura, Jamwa, Kalla, Kallan, Kharkhada, Khawarani, Kooda, Lalwas, Langadiyawas, Mahangi, Manota, Mathasoola, Nayabas, Natata, Narpatiyawas, Nayala, Nimbi, Neemala, Newer, Papar, Palera, Phootalaw, Rahori, Raipur, Raisar, Rajpurwastala, Ramgarh, Rampura, Roopwas, Saipura, Samred, Sankotada, Tala, Thali, Tholai, Todameena, Radhagovindpura, Nangal Bela, Bad Rasulpura, Nimbi, Kelanwas.
