= Jaipur district =

- District of Rajasthan
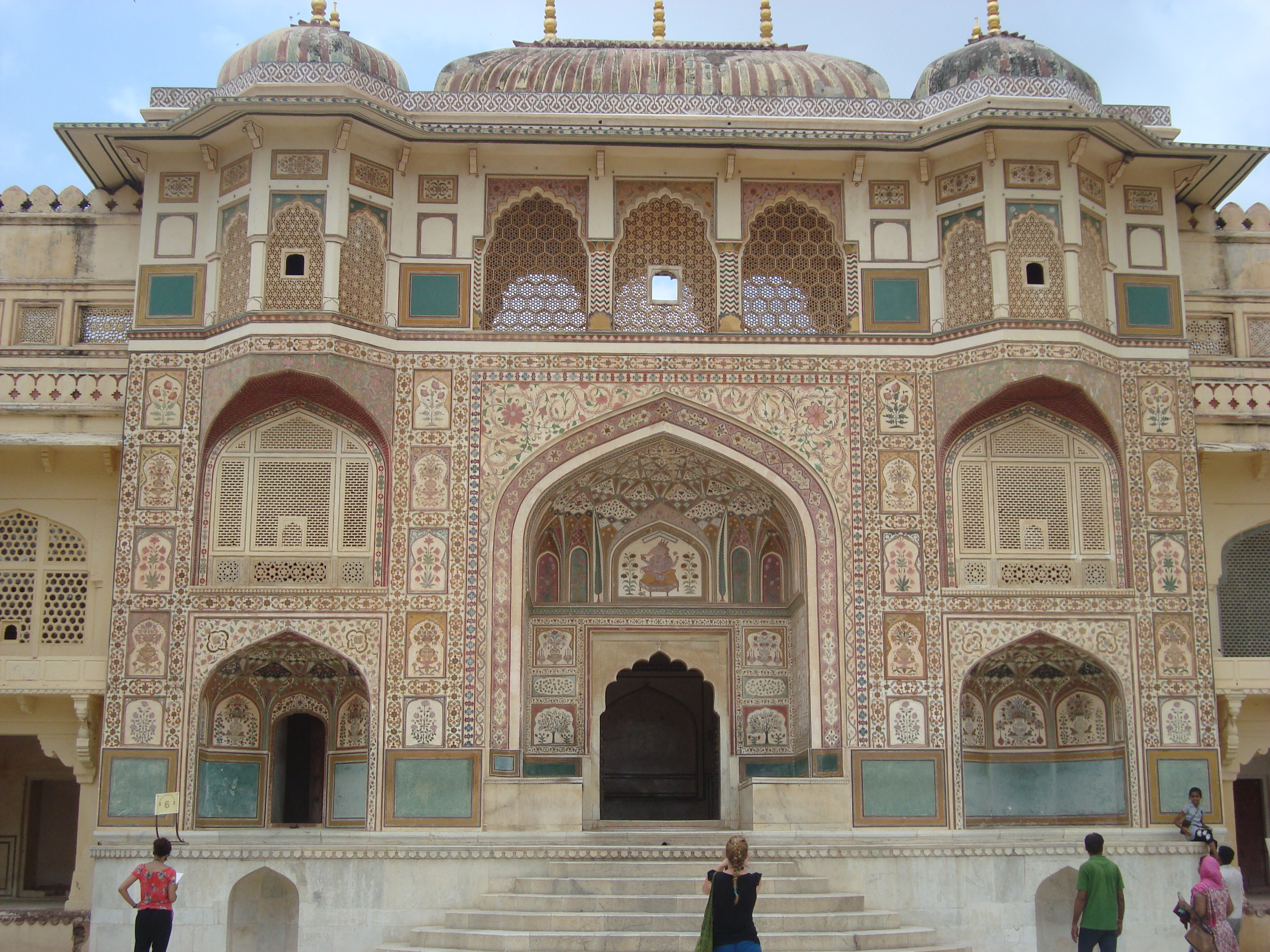
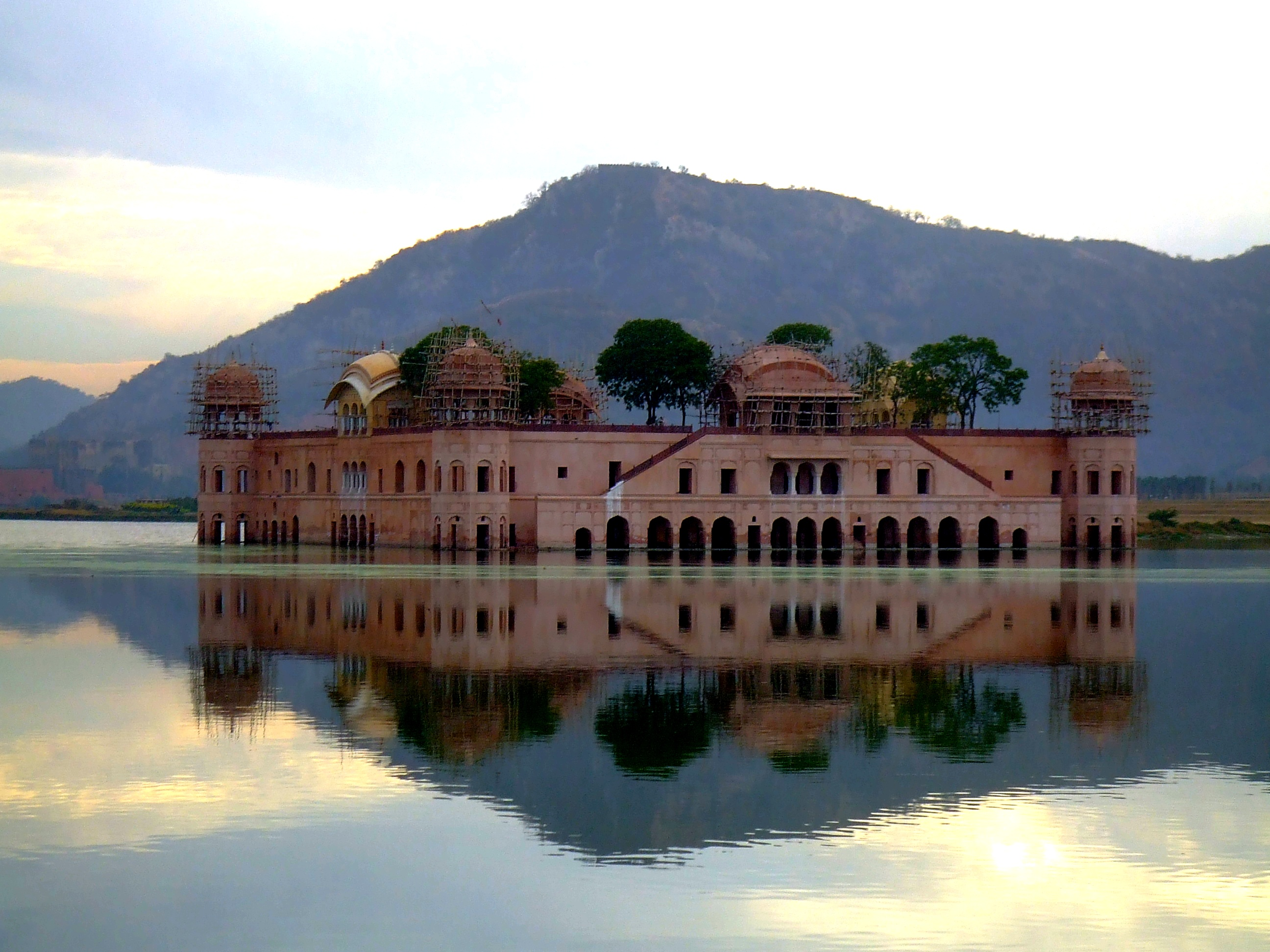
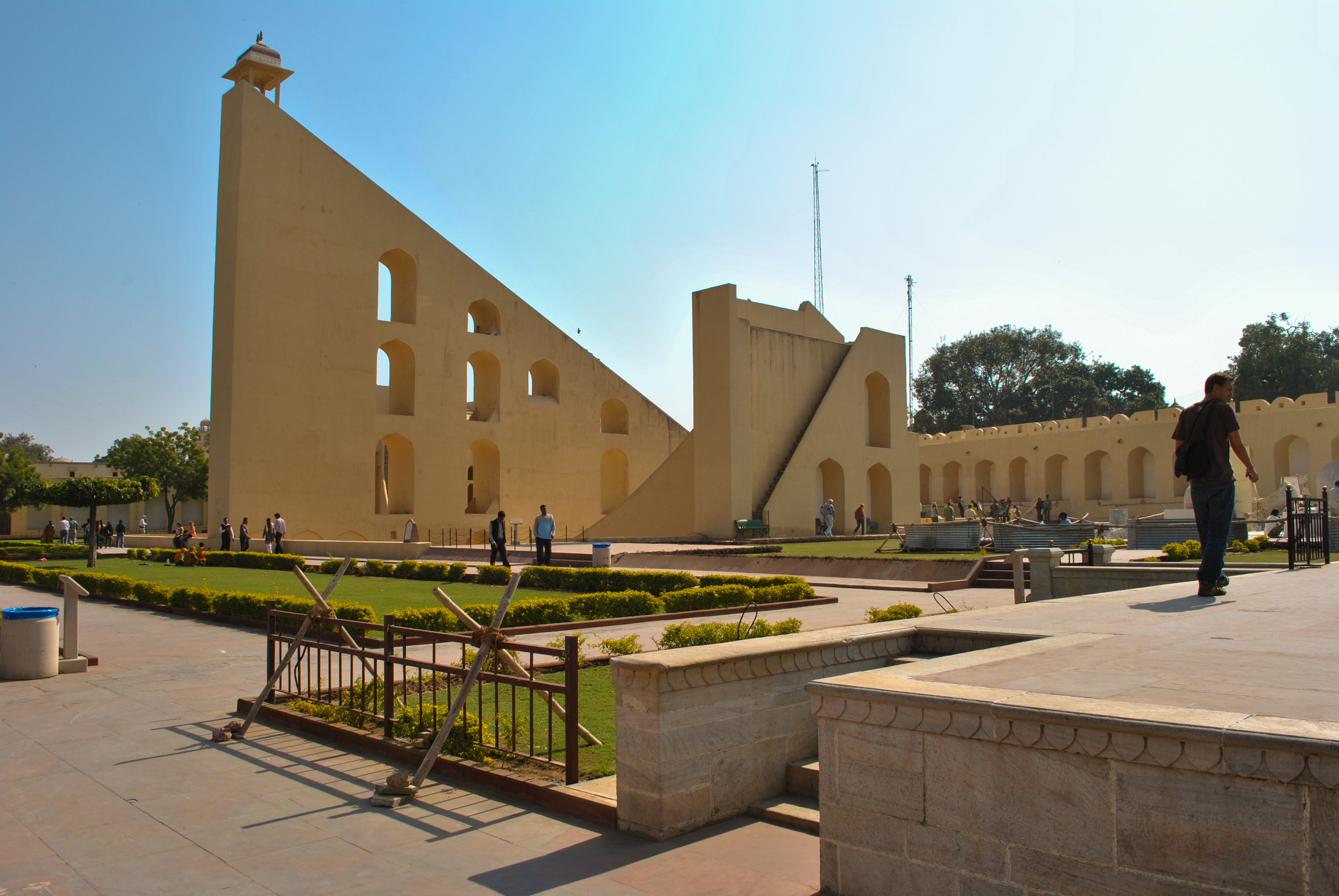
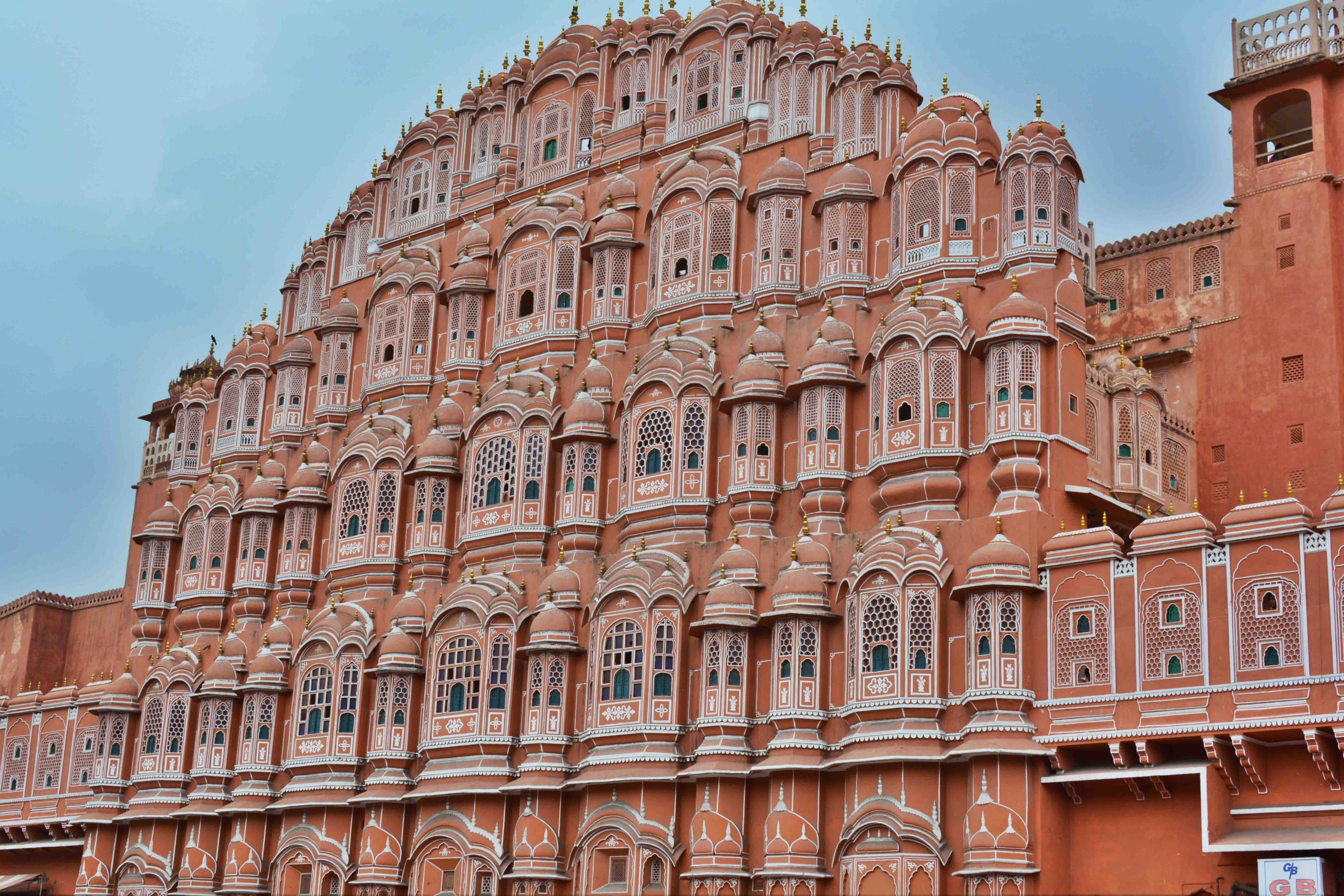
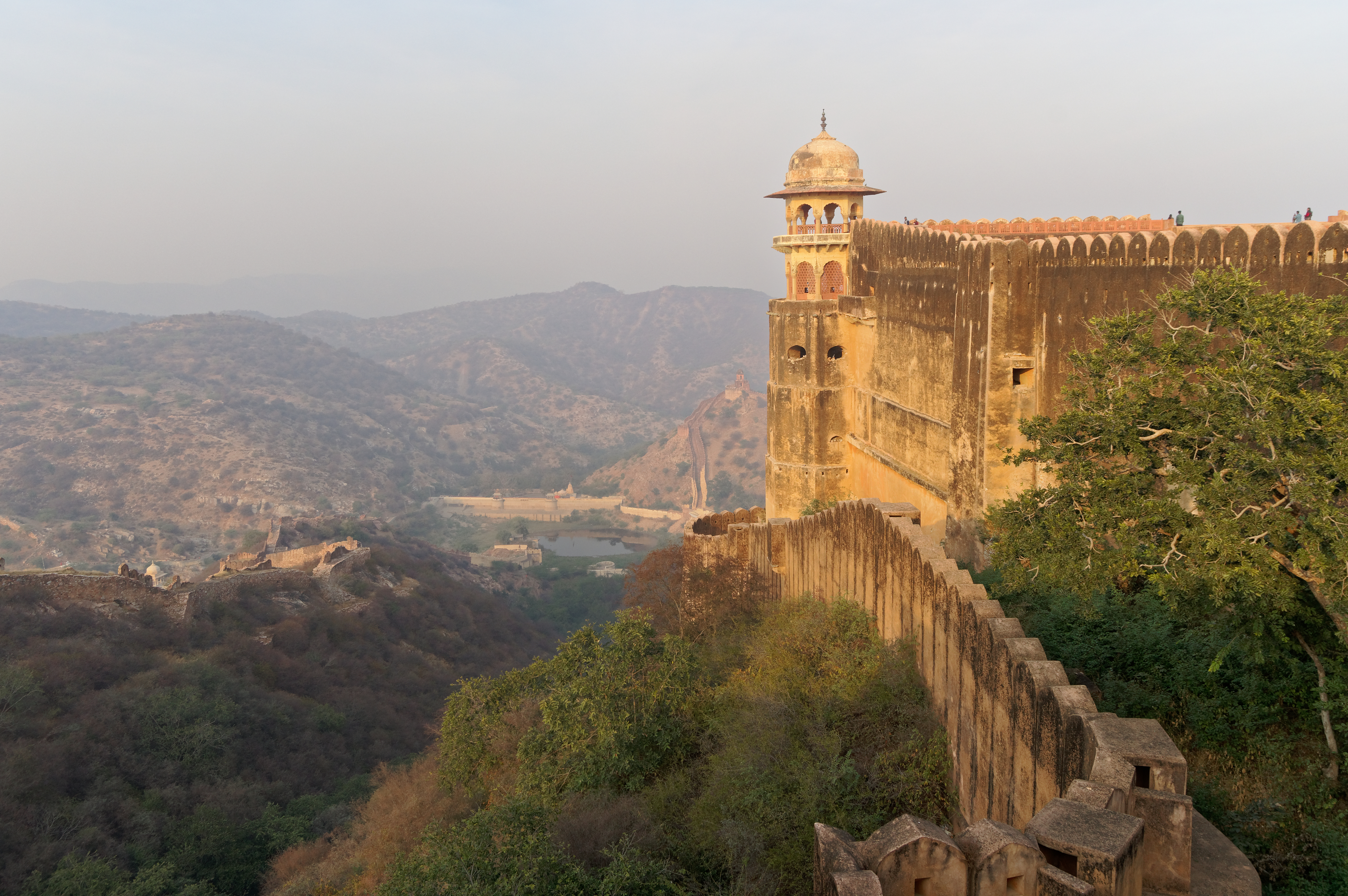
- Clockwise from top-left: Ganesh Pol in Amber Fort, Jal Mahal, Hawa Mahal, Jaigarh Fort, Jantar Mantar in Jaipur

- Location of Jaipur district in Rajasthan
- Coordinates (Jaipur): 26.926°N 75.8235°E
- Country: India
- State: Rajasthan
- Division: Jaipur
- Headquarters: Jaipur
- Tehsils: 16

Government
  - District collector: Prakash Rajpurohit, IAS
  - Vidhan Sabha constituencies: 19

Area
  - Total: 11,143 km^{2} (4,302 sq mi)

Population (2011)
  - Total: 6,626,178
  - Density: 595/km^{2} (1,540/sq mi)

Demographics
  - Literacy: 76%
  - Sex ratio: 910
- Time zone: UTC+05:30 (IST)
- Major highways: National Highway 21 (NH-21); National Highway 48 (NH-48)
- Average annual precipitation: 459.8 mm
- Website: jaipur.rajasthan.gov.in

Jaipur district is a district in the state of Rajasthan in Northern India. The city of Jaipur, which is Rajasthan's capital and the largest city, is the district headquarters. It is the tenth most populous district in India (out of 780).

== Etymology ==
The district derives its name from its administrative headquarters, the city of Jaipur. The city was established in 1727 by Maharaja Sawai Jai Singh II (1693–1744), the ruler of Amber, and named in his honour. In Sanskrit, the suffix "pur" or "pura" is commonly used to denote a city or town. Thus, the name "Jaipur" translates to "The City of Jai," commemorating its founder, Jai Singh II.

== Geography ==
The district is located between 26°23' and 27°51' north latitude, and 74°55' and 76°50' east longitude. It covers an area of 11,143 square kilometres (4,302 sq mi), accounting for approximately 3.26% of the state's total area, and ranks 9th in size among the districts of the state. (Note: This data is based on the administrative boundaries as per the 2011 Census, prior to the reorganisation of districts in 2023.) The district stretches about 180 kilometres (110 mi) from east to west, while its north to south length is approximately 110 kilometres (68 mi). It shares its northern boundary with the Sikar district and the state of Haryana. Towards the south, the district is bordered by Tonk district. On the eastern side, it is surrounded by Alwar, Dausa, and Sawai Madhopur districts, while to the west, it is flanked by Nagaur and Ajmer districts.

The district is located on the eastern border of the Thar Desert and is largely covered with a thick layer of soil and alluvial deposits. The district is surrounded by the Aravali mountain range on three sides. Towards the north and east, the region is bordered by hill ranges and several isolated peaks, which rise about 200 metres (660 ft) above the surrounding plains. These hills form a part of the Aravali mountain range. At different locations within the district, these ranges are known by various local names. The hills originate from the area around Sambhar Lake and continue into Jhunjhunu district. In Jaipur tehsil, these are commonly called Puranaghat and Nahargarh. In the tehsils of Kotputli, Bairath, and Jamwa Ramgarh, the hills are referred to by names such as Ada Doongar, Chapa, Khan Rahori, Khan Dogota, Jaroonda, Khan Raipur, and Khan Badri. Additionally, the Torawati hills are situated to the west of the Sabi and Banganga rivers.

== Divisions ==
Being the state capital, Jaipur has a Legislative Assembly. The 13 Sub-divisions in district are:

- Jaipur
- Amber
- Bassi
- Chaksu
- Chomu
- Mauzmabad
- Jamwa Ramgarh
- Phagi
- Phulera
- Kotputli
- Sanganer
- Shahpura
- Viratnagar

Panchayat Samitis are:

- Amber
- Bassi
- Chaksu
- Govindgarh
- Dudu
- Jamwa Ramgarh
- Phagi
- Sambhar
- Jhotwara
- Kotputli
- Shahpura
- Sanganer
- Viratnagar

Tehsils are: 3 new tehsils have recently been added, earlier there were 13 tehsils and now 16.

- Amber
- Bassi
- Chaksu
- Chomu
- Dudu
- Jamwa Ramgarh
- Phagi
- Sambhar
- Jaipur
- Kotputli
- Shahpura
- Sanganer
- Viratnagar
- Kot Khawada
- Kishangarh-Renwal
- Mauzamabad
- Paota

Sub-divisions	13
Tehsil	16
Villages	2369
Panchayat Samiti (Block)	13
Gram Panchayat	489
Nagar Palika	10
Nagar Nigam	2

== Demographics ==
Historical population
Year	Pop.	±% p.a.
1901	944,116	—
1911	889,399	−0.60%
1921	729,878	−1.96%
1931	813,631	+1.09%
1941	926,153	+1.30%
1951	1,186,745	+2.51%
1961	1,508,009	+2.42%
1971	1,993,463	+2.83%
1981	2,802,414	+3.46%
1991	3,887,895	+3.33%
2001	5,251,071	+3.05%
2011	6,626,178	+2.35%

Religions in Jaipur district (2011)
Religion	Percent
Hinduism	87.83%
Islam	10.38%
Jainism	1.22%
Others	0.57%

According to the 2011 census Jaipur district has a population of 6,626,178, roughly equal to the nation of Libya or the US state of Washington. This gives it a ranking of 10th in India (out of a total of 640). The district has a population density of 598 inhabitants per square kilometre (1,550/sq mi). Its population growth rate over the decade 2001–2011 was 26.91%. Jaipur has a sex ratio of 909 females for every 1000 males, and a literacy rate of 76.44%. 52.40% of the population lives in urban areas. Scheduled Castes and Scheduled Tribes make up 15.14% and 7.97% of the population respectively.

=== Languages ===
Languages of Jaipur district (2011)
1. Hindi (45.9%)
2. Rajasthani (34.4%)
3. Dhundari (11.3%)
4. Urdu (2.74%)
5. Marwari (2.52%)
6. Sindhi (1.21%)
7. Others (1.93%)

At the time of the 2011 Census of India, 45.85% of the population in the district spoke Hindi, 34.44% Rajasthani, 11.31% Dhundari, 2.74% Urdu, 2.52% Marwari, 1.21% Sindhi, 0.42% Punjabi and 0.41% Bengali as their first language.

== Culture ==
=== Notable personalities ===
- HH Galtapeethadheeshwar Swami Avadheshacharya Ji Maharaj - Mahant, Shri Galta Peeth.
- Hemant Shesh (1952- ) Writer and civil servant. Born in Jaipur.

== Climate ==
Climate data for Jaipur
Month	Jan	Feb	Mar	Apr	May	Jun	Jul	Aug	Sep	Oct	Nov	Dec	Year
Record high °C (°F)	31.7 (89.1)	36.7 (98.1)	42.8 (109.0)	44.9 (112.8)	48.5 (119.3)	47.2 (117.0)	46.7 (116.1)	41.7 (107.1)	41.7 (107.1)	40 (104)	36.1 (97.0)	31.3 (88.3)	48.5 (119.3)
Mean daily maximum °C (°F)	22.5 (72.5)	26.1 (79.0)	32 (90)	37.6 (99.7)	41.1 (106.0)	39.7 (103.5)	34.8 (94.6)	32.7 (90.9)	34.2 (93.6)	34.1 (93.4)	29.6 (85.3)	25.1 (77.2)	32.5 (90.5)
Mean daily minimum °C (°F)	8.4 (47.1)	12 (54)	17.4 (63.3)	22.8 (73.0)	27.1 (80.8)	27.9 (82.2)	26.2 (79.2)	24.9 (76.8)	24 (75)	20.1 (68.2)	14.4 (57.9)	9.9 (49.8)	19.6 (67.3)
Record low °C (°F)	−2.2 (28.0)	−2.2 (28.0)	3.3 (37.9)	9.4 (48.9)	15.6 (60.1)	19.7 (67.5)	20.6 (69.1)	18.9 (66.0)	15 (59)	11.1 (52.0)	3.3 (37.9)	0 (32)	−2.2 (28.0)
Average precipitation mm (inches)	5.9 (0.23)	10.2 (0.40)	4.4 (0.17)	7.1 (0.28)	12.2 (0.48)	61.9 (2.44)	190.5 (7.50)	203.4 (8.01)	79.6 (3.13)	19.4 (0.76)	1.9 (0.07)	3.8 (0.15)	600.3 (23.62)
Source: India Meteorological Department

== See also ==
- Jaipur City
- Amber
- Dhundhar
- Jaipur Rural district
- Kingdom of Amber
- History of Jaipur
- Sawai Jai Singh
- Jantar Mantar
