= List of rivers of India =

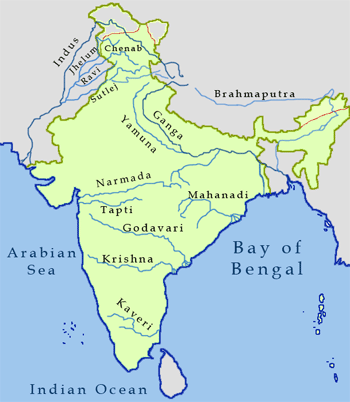
Map of India showing the major rivers.

With a land area of 3,287,263 km^{2} (1,269,219 sq mi) consisting of diverse ecosystems, India has many river systems and perennial streams. The rivers of India can be classified into four groups – Himalayan, Deccan, Coastal, and Inland drainage. The Himalayan rivers, mainly fed by glaciers and snowmelt, arise from the Himalayas. The Deccan rivers system consists of rivers in Peninsular India that drain into the Bay of Bengal and the Arabian Sea. There are numerous short coastal rivers, predominantly on the West coast. There are few inland rivers, which do not drain into the sea.

Most of the rivers in India originate from the four major watersheds in India. The Himalayan watershed is the source of majority of the major river systems in India including the three longest rivers–the Ganges, the Brahmaputra and the Indus. These three river systems are fed by more than 5000 glaciers. The Aravalli Range in the north-west serves the origin of few of the rivers such as the Chambal, the Banas and the Luni rivers.

The Narmada and Tapti rivers originate from the Vindhya and Satpura ranges in Central India. In the peninsular India, majority of the rivers originate from the Western Ghats and flow towards the Bay of Bengal, while only a few rivers flow from east to west from the Eastern Ghats to the Arabian sea. This is because of the difference in elevation of the Deccan plateau, which slopes gently from the west to the east. The largest of the peninsular rivers include the Godavari, the Krishna, the Mahanadi and the Kaveri.

== River systems ==
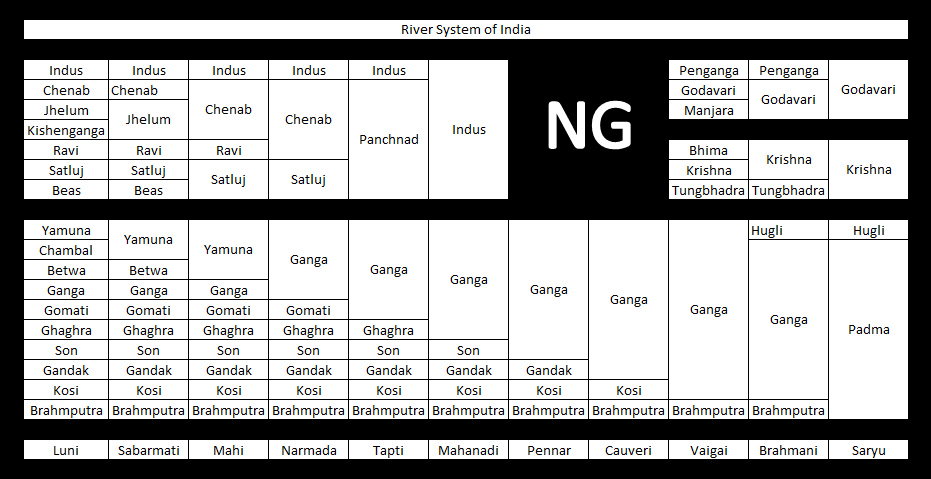
Chart showing the major river systems of India along with the tributaries and distributaries of some of them.

As per the classification of Food and Agriculture Organization, the rivers systems are combined into 20 river units, which includes 14 major rivers systems and 99 smaller river basins grouped into six river units. The Ganges-Brahmaputra-Meghna basin is the largest, which covers 34% of the land area and contributes to nearly 59% of the available water resources.

River unit	Region	Draining into	Major River(s)	Other Rivers	Catchment area (% of land area)	Average annual runoff (km^{3})	Surface water (km^{3})
Ganges-Brahmaputra-Meghna	North-east	Bay of Bengal (Note: The Ganges splits into Hooghly and Padma Rivers after Farakka in West Bengal. The Hooghly flows into the Bay of Bengal near Kolkata. The Brahmaputra splits into two distributaries. In Bangladesh, the western branch merges with the lower Ganges to form the Padma River and the eastern branch joins with the Meghna River. The Padma and Meghna rivers converge to form the eastern part of the Ganges Delta and flow out into the Bay of Bengal.)	Brahmaputra	Beki; Bhogdoi; Dhansiri; Dibang; Dihing; Dikhow; Kameng; Kolong; Kopili; Lohit; Manas; Raidak; Sankosh; Subansiri; Teesta	34.0	610.62	294.0
Ganges-Brahmaputra-Meghna	North-east	Bay of Bengal	Ganges	Alaknanda; Mandakini; Pindar; Nandakini; Dhauliganga; Rishiganga; Atrai; Bagmati; Bhagirathi; Bhilangna; Jahanavi; Burhi Gandak; Phalgu; Gandaki; Ghaghara; Sharda; Darma; Gori Ganga; Sarju; West Rapti; Rohni; Gomti; Kathana; Sarayan; Hooghly; Ajay; Barakar; Churni; Damodar; Dwarakeswar; Ichamati; Jadh Ganga; Jalangi; Mayurakshi; Mundeswari; Rupnarayan; Kosi; Kamla; Mahananda; Padma; Punarbhaba; Ramganga; Sone; Banas; Johilla; Gopad; Kanhar; North Koel; Amanat; Rihand; Yamuna; Betwa; Bina; Dhasan; Halali; Chambal; Banas; Berach; Dheel; Morel; Kali Sindh; Kuno; Parbati; Shipra; Ahar; Gambhir; Parbati; Hindon; Ken; Sunar; Sindh; Kwari; Pahuj	34.0	610.62	294.0
Ganges-Brahmaputra-Meghna	North-east	Bay of Bengal	Meghna	Barak; Tuivai; Dakatia; Dhalai; Dhaleshwari; Feni; Gumti; Kushiyara; Manu; Surma; Kangsha; Someshwari; Titas; Haora	34.0	610.62	294.0
Indus River Basin	North-west	Arabian Sea (Note: The Jhelum and Ravi join the Chenab, the Beas River joins the Sutlej. Later the Chenab joins with the Sutlej to form the Panjnad River, which merges with the Indus. The Indus River Delta is mostly in the Sindh province of Pakistan with a small portion in the Kutch Region of India.)	Indus	Chenab; Bhaga; Chandra; Jhelum; Lidder; Neelum; Pohru; Poonch; Sind; Marusudar; Ravi; Tawi; Shyok; Nubra; Suru; Dras; Shingo; Sutlej; Beas; Baspa; Parvati; Spiti; Uhl; Yapola; Zanskar; Markha; Tsarap; Doda	10.0	73.3	46.0
West flowing rivers between Kutch and Saurashtra	North-west	Arabian Sea		Aji; Ambika; Auranga; Bhadar; Bhurud; Chirai; Chok; Dai-minsar; Daman Ganga; Dhadhar; Fulki; Gajansar; Ghelo; Hiran; Kali; Kalubhar; Kankawati; Kareshwar; Kayla; Keri; Khalkhalio; Khari; Kharod; Khokhra; Kim; Kolak; Machchhu; Machchundri; Mahi; Malan; Malan-Gir; Mindhola; Mitiyativali; Nagmati; Nara; Nayra; Ozat; Padalio; Par; Pur; Rangmati; Rav; Raval; Rukmavati; Rupen; Rupen-Gir; Sai; Sang; Sangavadi; Saraswati-Gir; Shahi; Shetrunji; Sukhbhadar; Suvi; Und; Utavali	10.0	15.1	1.9
Godavari	Central	Bay of Bengal	Godavari	Darna; Indravati; Kinnerasani; Manjira; Maner; Pranhita; Wainganga; Andhari; Kanhan; Nag; Pioli; Pora; Pench; Kulbehra; Kolar; Sarrati; Sur; Wardha; Erai; Kar; Painganga; Wena; Pravara; Purna; Sabari; Sindphana; Taliperu	9.7	110.5	50
Krishna	Central	Bay of Bengal	Krishna	Agrani; Bhima; Bori; Ghod; Indrayani; Kamini; Kundali; Mula-Mutha; Mula; Mutha; Pavana; Nira; Sina; Ghataprabha; Koyna; Malaprabha; Musi; Panchganga; Tungabhadra; Tunga; Bhadra; Varada; Vedavathi; Vedganga; Venna; Warana; Yerla	8.0	78.1	76.3
Mahanadi	Central-east	Bay of Bengal	Mahanadi	Bhargavi; Danta; Daya; Devi; Hasdeo; Ib; Jonk; Kathajodi; Kuakhai; Kushabhadra; Mand; Ong; Pairi; Seonath; Shivnath; Sondur; Surubalijora; Tel; Telen	4.4	66.9	18.3
East flowing rivers between Pennar and Kanyakumari (excluding Kaveri)	South-east	Bay of Bengal		Adyar; Agniyar; Cooum; Kosasthalaiyar; Palar; Ponnaiyar; Swetha; Thamirabarani; Chittar; Gadananathi; Pachaiyar; Vaigai; Vaippar; Vellar-North; Vellar-South	3.1	16.5	13.1
Narmada	Central-west	Arabian Sea	Narmada	Barna; Choral; Dudhi; Kaveri; Kolar; Orsang; Shakkar; Sher; Tawa	3.1	45.6	14.5
East flowing rivers between Mahanadi and Pennar (excluding Godavari and Krishna)	South-east	Bay of Bengal		Budhabalanga; Kangsabati; Koina; North Karo; Rushikulya; Sankh; South Karo; South Koel	2.7	22.5	19.0
Kaveri	South	Bay of Bengal	Kaveri	Amaravati; Kodavanar; Nanganjiyar; Arkavathi; Kumudvathi; Vrishabhavathi; Bhavani; Moyar; Siruvani; Hemavati; Kabini; Kollidam; Lakshmana Tirtha; Noyyal; Sarabanga	2.5	21.4	6.9
Tapti	Central-west	Arabian Sea	Tapti	Arunavati; Girna; Gomai; Panzara; Purna; Morna; Vaan	2.0	14.9	11.9
Pennar	South-east	Bay of Bengal	Pennar	Cheyyeru; Chitravathi; Kunderu; Papagni; Sagileru	1.7	6.3	58.0
West flowing rivers between Tadri and Kanyakumari	South-west	Arabian Sea		Aghanashini; Bharathapuzha; Chaliyar; Chandragiri; Gangavalli; Kali; Kariangode; Netravati; Pamba; Periyar; Sharavathi	1.7	113.5	16.7
West flowing rivers between Tapti and Tadri	South-west	Arabian Sea		Baga; Chapora; Dahisar; Kundalika; Mandovi; Mapusa; Mithi; Oshiwara; Patalganga; Sal; Savitri; Shastri; Surya; Tansa; Terekhol; Ulhas; Vaitarna; Vashishti; Zuari	1.7	87.4	24.3
Brahmani-Baitarani	North-east	Bay of Bengal	Brahmani; Baitarani	Kharasrota	1.6	28.5	6.8
North-east rivers excluding Brahmaputra	North-east	Bay of Bengal (Note: These rivers flow through to Bangladesh, or Myanmar from India.)		Aie; Baralia; Bharalu; Bhogdoi; Borgang; Champabati; Diju; Dikhow; Dikrong; Diphlu; Dudhnoi; Gabharu; Gumti; Iril; Jatinga; Jhanji; Jiadhal; Jiri; Kaladan; Karnaphuli; Khowai; Krishnai; Kulsi; Mora Dhansiri; Muhuri; Myntdu; Nona; Pagladiya; Ranganadi; Mora Diphlu; Thega; Tipkai; Tirap; Tuni	1.1	31.0	
Mahi	North-west	Arabian Sea	Mahi	Gomati	1.1	11.0	34.5
Subarnarekha	North-east	Bay of Bengal	Subarnarekha	Kharkai	0.9	12.4	
Sabarmati	North-west	Arabian Sea	Sabarmati	Sei; Wakal	0.7	3.8	3.1
Rajasthan inland basin	North-east	None	Luni	Bandi; Ghaggar; Guhiya; Jawai; Jojari; Liladi; Sukri	Negligible	Negligible	15.0

== Alphabetical list ==
=== A–H ===
- Arvari
- Adyar
- Agniyar
- Ahar
- Ajay
- Aji
- Alaknanda
- Amanat
- Amaravathi
- Arkavati
- Atrai
- Baga
- Baitarani
- Balan
- Banas
- Banganga
- Barak
- Beas
- Bhadar
- Bhima
- Brahmani
- Brahmaputra
- Chambal
- Chapora
- Chenab
- Chitravathi
- Coovum
- Dheel
- Damanganga
- Deo
- Devi
- Daya
- Damodar
- Dhansiri
- Dharmamoola
- Dravyavati
- Falgu
- Gadananathi
- Gambhir
- Gandak
- Ganges
- Gayathripuzha
- Ghaggar
- Ghaghara
- Ghataprabha
- Girna
- Godavari
- Gomti
- Gosthani
- Gundlakamma
- Halali
- Hasdeo
- Hugli
- Hindon
- Hiran

=== I–L ===
- Ib
- Indus
- Indravati
- Indrayani
- Jaldhaka
- Jhelum
- Kabini
- Kadalundi
- Kahn
- Kali (Anas)
- Kali (KA)
- Kali (UK)
- Kali (UP)
- Karmanasha
- Kallada
- Kallayi
- Kalpathipuzha
- Kameng
- Kanhan
- Kamla
- Kannadipuzha
- Karha
- Karnaphuli
- Kaveri
- Kathajodi
- Ken
- Kodoor
- Koel
- Kolab
- Kolar (Narmada)
- Kolar (Kanhan)
- Kollidam
- Kosi
- Koyna
- Krishna
- Kshipra
- Kuakhai
- Kundali
- Lachen
- Lachung
- Lakshmana Tirtha
- Luni

=== M–R ===
- Machchhu
- Mahanadi
- Mahananda
- Mahakali
- Mahi
- Malaprabha
- Manas
- Mandakini
- Mandovi
- Manjira
- Manimala
- Manu
- Mapusa
- Markanda (HR)
- Markanda (TN)
- Matla
- Mayurakshi
- Meenachil
- Meghna
- Mithi
- Moyar
- Mula
- Musi
- Mutha
- Muvattupuzha
- Nag
- Nagavali
- Narmada
- Nethravathi
- Nubra
- Padma
- Pahuj
- Palar
- Panchganga
- Pamba
- Panjnad
- Panzara
- Parambikulam
- Parbati (HP)
- Parbati (MP)
- Parbati (RJ)
- Pavana
- Payaswini
- Penna
- Pench
- Penganga
- Penner
- Periyar
- Phalgu
- Ponnaiyar
- Pranhita
- Punarbhaba
- Purna-Godavari
- Purna-Tapti
- Ravi
- Rapti
- Rupnarayan

=== S–Z ===
- Saraswati
- Sarasvati
- Sarayu
- Sutlej
- Sunar
- Sabarmati
- Sal
- Sengar
- Sharavati
- Shetrunji
- Son
- Sharda
- Shimsha
- Shyok
- Subarnarekha
- Tapti
- Thamirabarani
- Tungabhadra
- Tamsa
- Tunga
- Terekhol
- Ulhas
- Umngot
- Vaan
- Vaigai
- Vamsadhara
- Varuna
- Vashishti
- Vedavathi
- Vellar-North
- Vellar-South
- Vrishabhavathi
- Vishwamitri
- Vaitarna
- Wainganga
- Wagh
- Wardha
- Yagachi
- Yamuna
- Zuari

== See also ==
- Indian rivers interlinking project
- Irrigation in India
- List of dams and reservoirs in India
- List of rivers in India by discharge
- List of national waterways in India
- Major rivers of India
