= List of rivers of Gujarat =

This article shows list of rivers of Gujarat grouped by name, origin, length and catchment area.

List of rivers of Gujarat
No.	Name	Origin	Length (km)	Catchment area (km^{2})	Ref
1	Aji	Sardhara ridge	102	2130	
2	Ambica	Saputara hills	136	2715	
3	Auranga	Near Bhervi village	97	699	
4	Banas	Aravalli Hills, Rajasthan	266	8674	
5	Bhadar	Near Jasdan	200	7094	
6	Bhurud	Chavdka Adhochhni village	50	326	
8	Chirai	Near Khirsara	30	365.20	
9	Chok	Near Kalarvadh	20	63.58	
10	Dai-minsar	Near Minsar	100	1180	
11	Daman Ganga	Sahyadri hill	131.30	2318	
12	Dhadhar	Pavagadh Hill	142	4201	
13	Fulki	Near Lilpar village	18	120	
14	Gajansar	Near Vigodi village	37	159	
15	Ghelo	Jasdan hills	118	622	
16	Hiran	Gir Forest	40	518	
17	Kali (Sandhro)	Near Ravleshvar village	40	147.65	
18	Kalubhar	Near Chamardi Village	94	1965	
19	Kankawati	Near Bhilpur village	40	329.60	
20	Kareshwar	Near Kidianagar village	16	97.41	
21	Kayla	Near Sumarasar village	25	168.35	
22	Keri	Hindod hills	183	560	
23	Khalkhalio	Bhabhat hills	50	405	
24	Khari	Near Matana Madh village	50	113.15	
25	Kharod	Near Gadhshisha village	40	354.60	
26	Khokhra	Near Jaru	40	93.6	
27	Kim	Saputara hill	107	1286	
28	Kolak	Saputara hills	50	584	
29	Machchhu	Madla hills(Jasdan)	130	2515	
30	Machchundri	Gir Forest	59	406	
31	Mahi	Vindhyachal Hills	583	34,842	
32	Malan	Mordhara hills	44	332	
33	Malan-2	Gir Forest	55	158	
34	Mindhola	Near Doswada (Songadh)	105	1518	
35	Mitiyativali	Near Mitiyati village	20	165.75	
36	Nagmati	Near Bharapar village	50	135.70	
37	Nara	Near Paneli (Walka) village	25	233.1	
38	Narmada	Amarkantak, Madhya Pradesh	1312	97,410	
39	Nayra	Near Mothada	32	279.57	
40	Ozat	Near Visavadar	125	3185	
41	Padalio	Khambhaliya hills	110	345	
42	Par	Paykhad, Maharashtra	51	907	
43	Pur	Near Nagor village	40	602.5	
44	Purna	Saputara hill	180	2431	
45	Rangmati	Near Rampar	50	518	
46	Rav	Near Lilpar village	25	125.9	
47	Raval	Gir Forest	65	436	
48	Rukmavati	Near Rampar-Vekra village	50	448	
49	Rupen	Tarnga hills	156	2500	
50	Rupen2	Gir Forest	75	166	
51	Sabarmati	Aravalli Hills, Rajasthan	371	21,674	
52	Sai	Near Reha village	25	44.89	
53	Sang	Near Nagalpar	16	171.1	
54	Sangavadi	Gir Forest	38	576	
55	Saraswati (Gir)	Gir Forest	50	370	
56	Shahi	Gir Forest	38	163	
57	Shetrunji	Gir Forest	227	5636	
58	Sukhbhadar	Vadi hills	194	2118	
59	Suvi	Near Badargadh village	32	160.60	
60	Tapti	Betul, Madhya Pradesh	724	65,145	
61	Und	Lodhika Ridge	80	1615	
62	Utavali	Kaniad hills	125	388.50	
63	Nilka River	Near Bhimanth Mahadev	75	183	
