= Lilapur =

Lilapur may refer to:

- Lilapur Kalan, Allahabad, Uttar Pradesh
- Lilapur, Pratapgarh, Uttar Pradesh
- Lilapur, Ahmadabad, Gujarat
- Lilapur, Rajkot, Gujarat
- Lilapur, Surendranagar, Gujarat
