= Malan River =

Malan River may refer to:

- Malan River (Mordhara hills), a river in Gujarat, India
- Malan River (Gir Forest), a river in Gujarat, India
