= Malana =

Malana may refer to

- Basti Malana - a town in Punjab, Pakistan
- Malana, Himachal Pradesh - an ancient village in India
- Malana, Khyber Pakhtunkhwa - a town in NWFP, Pakistan
- Parachinar Malana - a town in Kurram Agency, Pakistan

== See also ==
- Malan (disambiguation)
