= Malan =

Malan may refer to:

== People (family name) ==
- Adolf Malan (born 1961), South African rugby union footballer
- Andre Malan (born 1991), South African cricketer
- César Malan (1787–1864), Swiss Protestant minister and hymn-writer.
- Charl Malan (born 1989), English cricketer
- David H. Malan (1922–2020), British psychotherapist.
- David J. Malan, American computer scientist
- Dawid Malan (born 1987), English cricketer
- Janneman Malan (born 1996), South African cricketer
- Lucio Malan (born 1960), Italian politician
- Pedro Malan (born 1943), Brazilian economist and former Minister of Finance
- Pieter Malan (born 1989), South African cricketer
- Solomon Caesar Malan (1812–1894), Orientalist

=== Members of the South African Malan family ===
- Charl W. Malan (1883–1933), South African Minister of Railways and Harbours, 1924–1933
- F. S. Malan (1871–1941), South African Minister of Education 1910–24
- Daniel François Malan (D. F. Malan, 1874–1959), Prime Minister of South Africa 1948–54
- Adolph Malan (AKA Sailor Malan, 1910–1963), Royal Air Force fighter ace in the Second World War
- Magnus Malan (1930–2011), general, Chief of the South African Army, Chief of the South African Defence Force and Minister of Defence, 1980–1991
- Wynand Malan (born 1943), Afrikaner South African politician
- Rian Malan (born 1954), author, journalist and political activist

== People (other name) ==
- Malan Breton (born 1973), Taiwanese-born fashion designer and media personality

== Places ==
- Malan River (Mordhara hills), a river in Gujarat, India
- Malan River (Gir Forest), a river in Gujarat, India
- Malan Subdistrict (马栏街道), subdistrict in Shahekou, Liaoning, China
- Malan, Henan (马栏镇), town in Yanling County, Xuchang, Henan, China
- Malan, Shaanxi (马栏镇), town in Xunyi County, Shaanxi, China
- Malan, Shanxi (马兰镇), town in Gujiao, Shanxi, China
- Malan (film), a 1942 Bollywood film
- Malan (馬蘭) was the name of an elephant in Taipei Zoo who was the partner of Lin Wang

== See also ==
- Malana (disambiguation)
- Ma Lan (born 1962), Chinese Huangmei opera performer
