= Kolar River =

Kolar River may refer to:

- Kolar River (Madhya Pradesh), India
- Kolar River (Maharashtra), India
