= Chirai =

Chirai may refer to:

- Cheelai (チライ, Chirai), a character in Dragon Ball media
- Chirai River, a river in western India in Gujarat
- Madrasa (grape), a grape variety also known as Chirai
- Sirai (lit. 'Prison'; also spelled Chirai), a 1984 Indian drama film
