= Auranga River =

Auranga River may refer to:

- Auranga River (Jharkhand)
- Auranga River (Gujarat)
