= Kanakpur-Kansad =

- Location in Gujarat, India Kanakpur-Kansad (India)
- Coordinates: 21.095711°N 72.822533°E
- Country: India
- State: Gujarat
- District: Surat
- Talukas: Choryasi

Area
  - Total: 5.12 km^{2} (1.98 sq mi)
- Elevation: 13 m (43 ft)

Population (2009)
  - Total: 31,456
  - Density: 16,000/km^{2} (41,000/sq mi)

Languages
  - Official: Gujarati, Hindi
- Time zone: UTC+5:30 (IST)
- PIN: 394230
- Telephone code: 0261
- Vehicle registration: GJ-5
- Website: gujaratindia.com

Kanakpur-Kansad is a town in Surat Municipal Corporation in Surat district in the Indian state of Gujarat. The town is located 25 km south of Surat off the Surat-Navsari highway near Sachin. The town is situated on the banks of Mindhola River. Due to its proximity to Industrial town of Sachin many labors and workers from textile industry reside here. The majority of the population reside here are native Kolis.

== Geography ==
The city is located at an average elevation of 12 metres (66 feet).

== Demographics ==
2001 India census, Kanakpur-Kansad had a population of 23567. Males constitute 54% of the population and females 46%. Kanakpur-Kansad has an average literacy rate of 74%, higher than the national average of 59.5%: male literacy is 81%, and female literacy is 63%. In Kanakpur-Kansad, 14% of the population is under 6 years of age. The town was a large village before decade having a population of around 17,384 but due to the industrialization of Sachin, the town began to show population growth and hence the gram panchayat was upgraded to a municipality to provide basic amenities.

== Transport ==
By road: Kanakpur-Kansad is 17 km from Udhana and 22 km from Surat.

By air: Nearest airport is Surat which is 22 km from Kanakpur-Kansad.

== See also ==
- List of tourist attractions in Surat
