= Talala, Gujarat =

Settlement in India

Talala
- Town
- Location within Gujarat
- Coordinates: 21.05°N 70.55°E
- Country: India
- State: Gujarat
- District: Gir Somnath

Population
  - Total: 21,060
- Time zone: UTC+5:30 (IST)
- Pincode(s): 362 150
- Area code: 02877
- Vehicle registration: GJ-32
- Spoken languages: Gujarati

Talala is a town and a taluka in Gir Somnath district in the Indian state of Gujarat. Talala is famous for Asiatic lions and orchards of Kesar mangoes.

== Sri Bai ashram ==
Sri Bai ashram is located on the bank of Hiran River. It is a historic temple of Sri Bai.

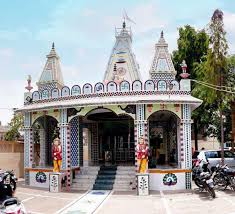
Shree bai ashram

== Gir National Park ==
In Sasan Gir The Asiatic Lion hub

== Hadmatiya stupa ==
Buddhist Stupa, belonging to the era of Kshatrapas (built in the 2nd century), locally known as Vajir Panat No Kotho is in the forest three kilometres from Talala Taluka. It is located on the bank of Sarasvati river. The outer part of the stupa was built around the start of the Common Era using burnt bricks. The inner part is filled with undressed stones.
