= Nara River =

Nara River may refer to:

- Nara (Oka), a tributary of the Oka River in Russia.
- Nara River (India), in the Kutch district, Gujarat, India.
- Nara River (Sindh), a historical dried-up river bed in Sindh, Pakistan, which has been reused for a Nara Canal.
