= Dai-minsar River =

Dai-minsar River dai minsar

Location
- Country: India
- State: Gujarat

Physical characteristics
- Source
  - location: India
- Mouth
  - location: Arabian Sea, India
- Length: 100 km (62 mi)
- Discharge
  - location: Arabian Sea

Dai-minsar River is a river in Gujarat whose origin is near Moincêr. Its basin has a maximum length of 100 km. The total catchment area of the basin is 1180 km2.

As per district map of Porbandar, Dai-minsar is likely a tributary of Ozat River.
