= Gir National Park =

National park and wildlife sanctuary in India

- IUCN category II (national park)
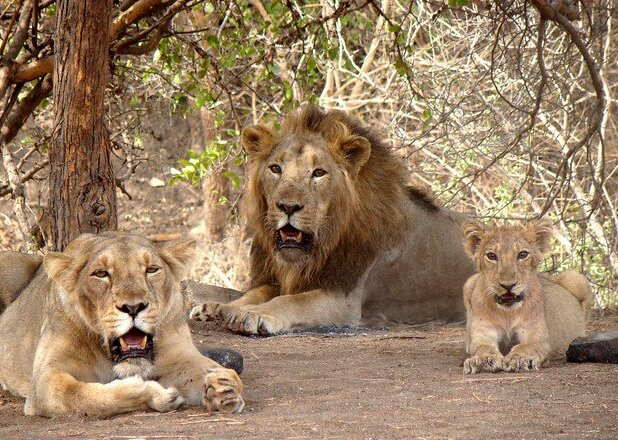
- Family of Asiatic lions at Gir National Park

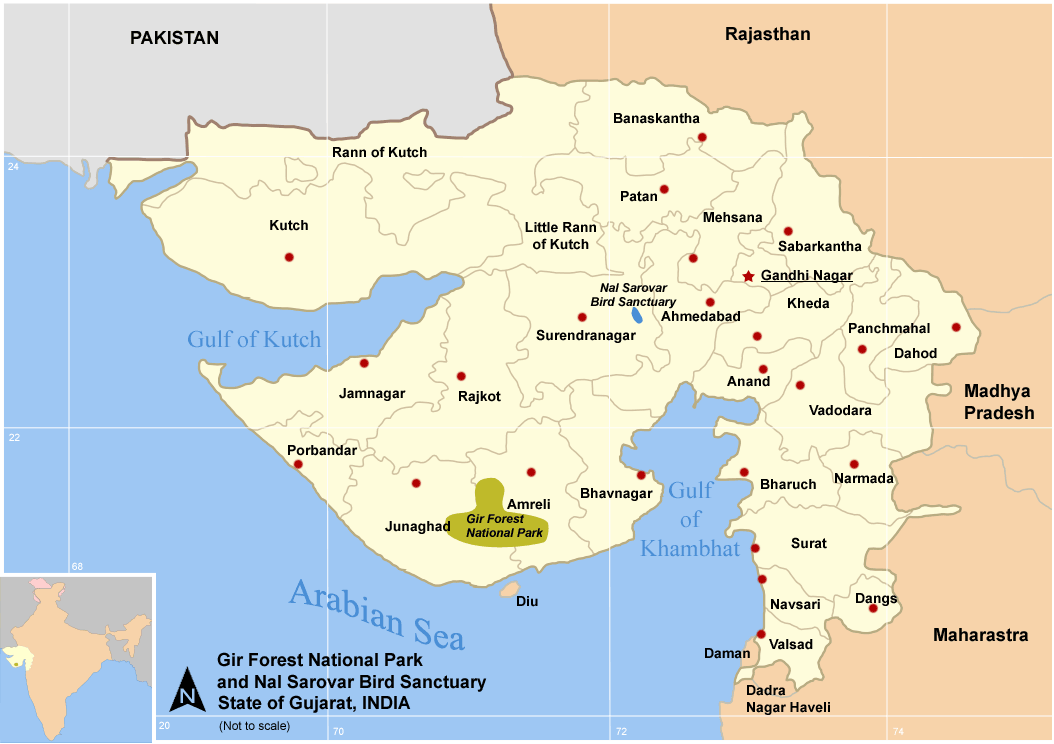
- Location map
- Interactive map of Gir National Park
- Location: Junagadh, Gir Somnath and Amreli Districts, Gujarat, India
- Nearest city: Talala (Gir), Veraval
- Coordinates: 21°08′08″N 70°47′48″E
- Area: 1,410.30 km^{2} (544.52 sq mi)
- Established: 1965
- Visitors: 60,148 (in 2004)
- Governing body: Forests & Environment Department

Gir National Park and Wildlife Sanctuary, also known as Sasan Gir, is a national park and wildlife sanctuary in Gujarat, India. It was established in 1965 in the erstwhile Nawab of Junagarh's private hunting area, with a total area of 1,410.30 km^{2} (544.52 sq mi), of which 258.71 km^{2} (99.89 sq mi) is fully protected as a national park and 1,151.59 km^{2} (444.63 sq mi) as wildlife sanctuary. It is part of the Khathiar-Gir dry deciduous forests ecoregion.

The 14th Asiatic Lion Census 2015 conducted in May 2015 noted the population as 523 (up 27% compared to the previous census in 2010). The population was 411 in 2010 and 359 in 2005. The lion population in Junagadh District was 268 individuals, 44 in Gir Somnath District, 174 in Amreli District, and 37 in Bhavnagar district. There are 109 males, 201 females and 213 cubs.

Gir National Park is closed from 16 June to 15 October each year during the monsoon season.

== History ==
In the 19th century, the rulers of Indian princely states used to invite the British colonists for hunting expeditions. At the end of the 19th century, only about a dozen Asiatic lions were left in India, all of them in the Gir Forest, which was part of the Nawab of Junagarh's private hunting grounds. British viceroys brought the drastic decline of the lion population in Gir to the attention of the Nawab of Junagadh, who established the sanctuary. Today, it is the only area in Asia where Asiatic lions occur and is considered one of the most important protected areas in Asia because of its biodiversity. The Gir ecosystem with its diverse flora and fauna is protected as a result of the efforts of the government forest department, wildlife activists and NGOs.

== Geography ==
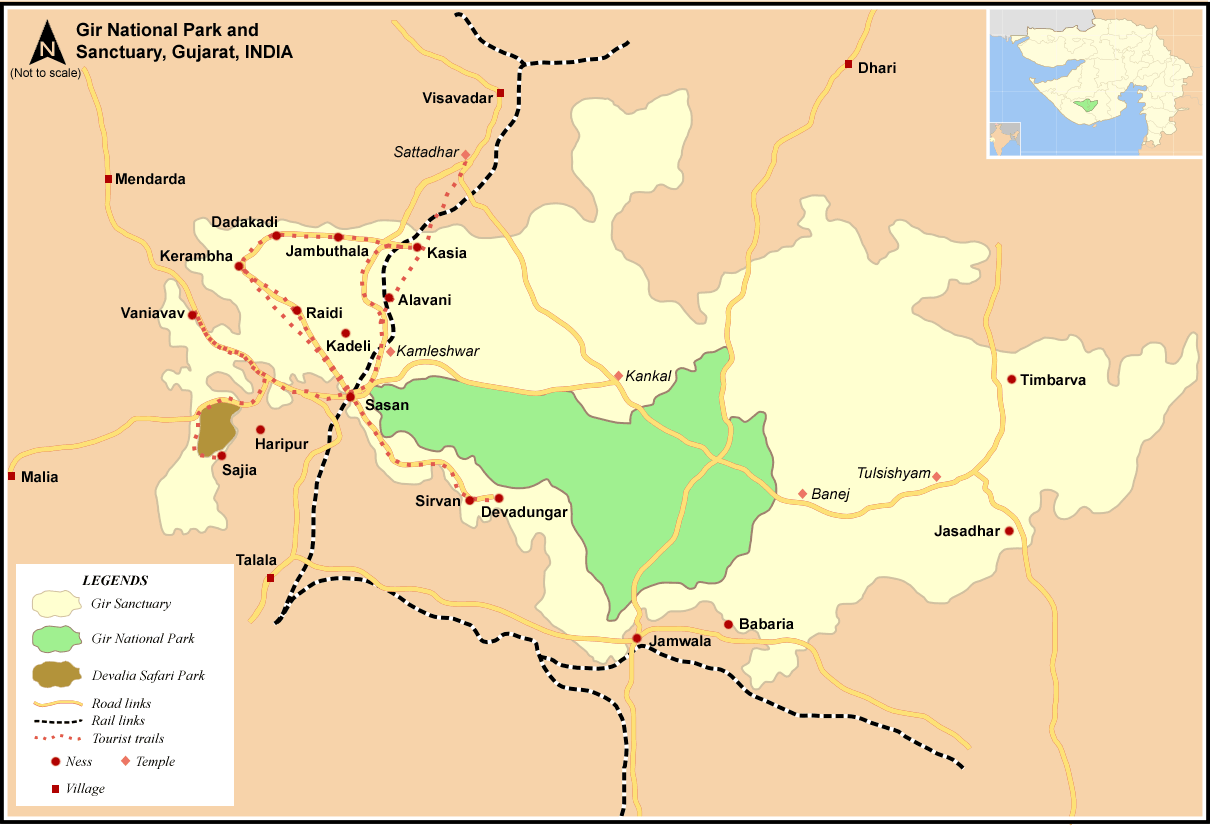
Gir National Park and Gir Wildlife Sanctuary

=== Water reserves ===
Panorama of the reservoir

The seven major perennial rivers of the Gir region are Hiran, Shetrunji, Dhatarvadi, Shingoda, Machhundri, Ambajal and Raval Rivers. The four reservoirs of the area are at four dams, one each on Hiran, Machhundri, Raval and Shingoda rivers, including the biggest reservoir in the area, the Kamleshwar Dam, dubbed 'the lifeline of Gir'.

== Flora ==
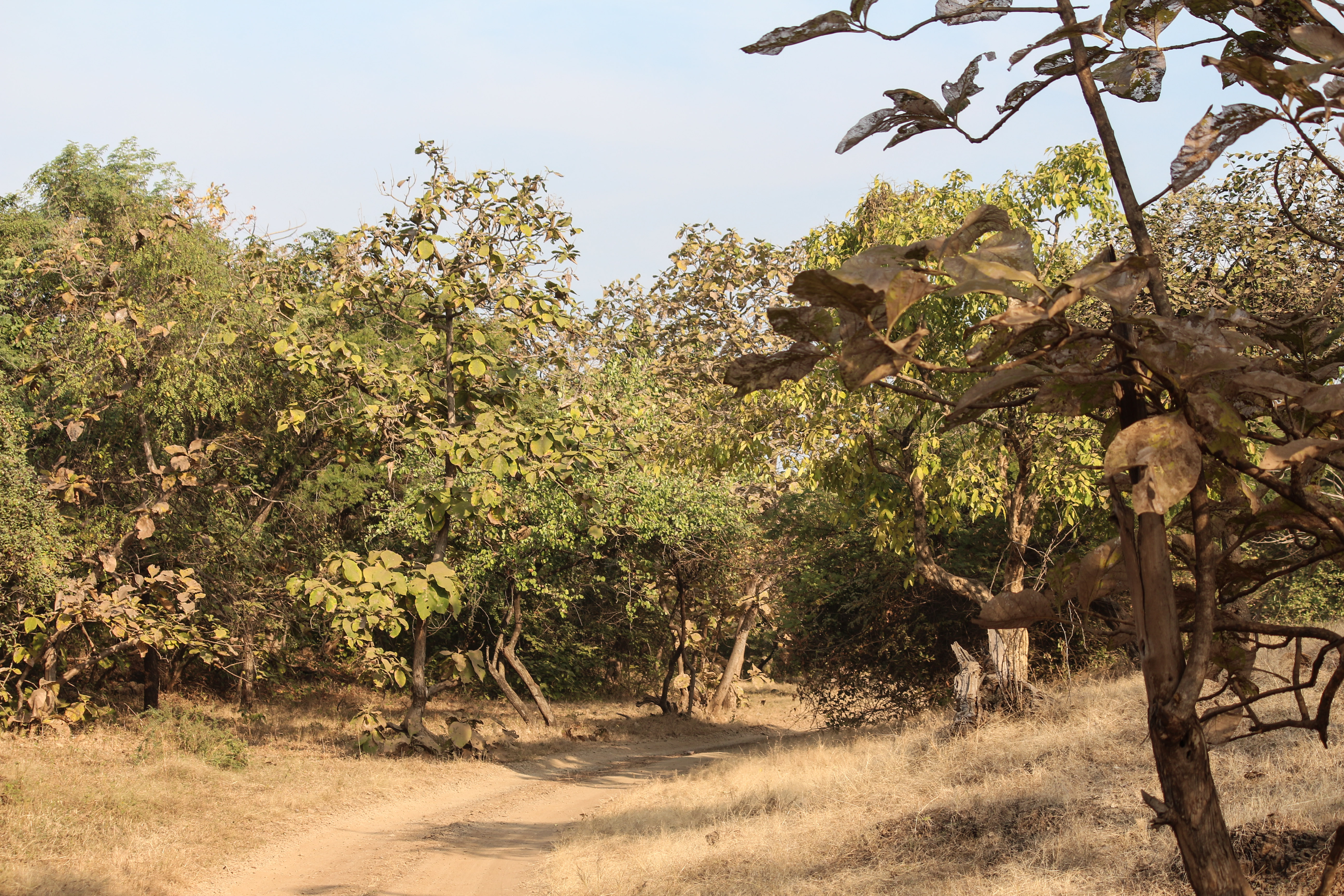
Teak trees

More than 400 plant species were recorded in the survey of Gir forest by Samtapau & Raizada in 1955. The botany department of M.S. University of Baroda has revised the count to 507 during their survey. According to the 1964 forest type classification by Champion & Sheth, the Gir forest falls under "5A/C-1a—very dry teak forest" classification. Teak occurs mixed with dry deciduous species. The degradation stages (DS) sub-types are thus derived as:

1. 5/DS1-Dry deciduous scrub forest and
2. 5/DS1-Dry savannah forests (Locally known as "vidis"). It is the largest dry deciduous forest in western India.

Teak bearing areas are mainly in the eastern portion of the forest, which constitutes nearly half of the total area. Several species of acacia trees are found. Also found here are ber, jamun (Syzygium cumini), babul (acacia), flame of the forest, zizyphus, tendu and dhak. Also plants like karanj, umlo, amli, sirus, kalam, charal and an occasional Vad (banyan tree) are found. These broadleaf trees provide cool shade and moisture content to the region. As part of the afforestation programme, casuarina and prosopis have been planted along the borders of the Gir forest.

The forest is an important biological research area with considerable scientific, educational, aesthetic and recreational values. It provides nearly 5 million kilograms of green grass by annual harvesting, which is valued approximately at ₹ 500 million (US$7.12 million). The forest provides nearly 123,000 metric tons worth of fuel wood annually.

== Wildlife ==
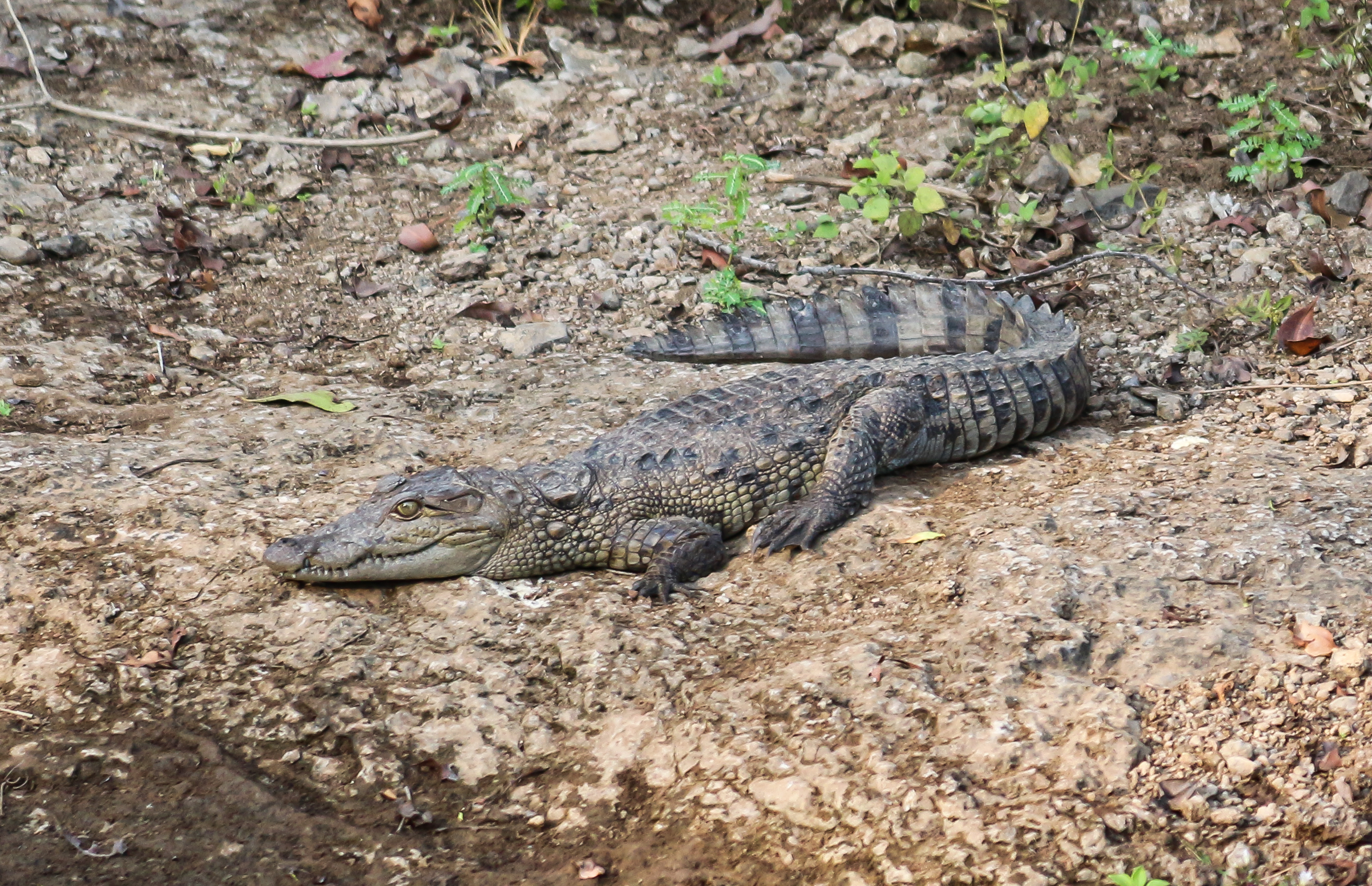
Mugger crocodile

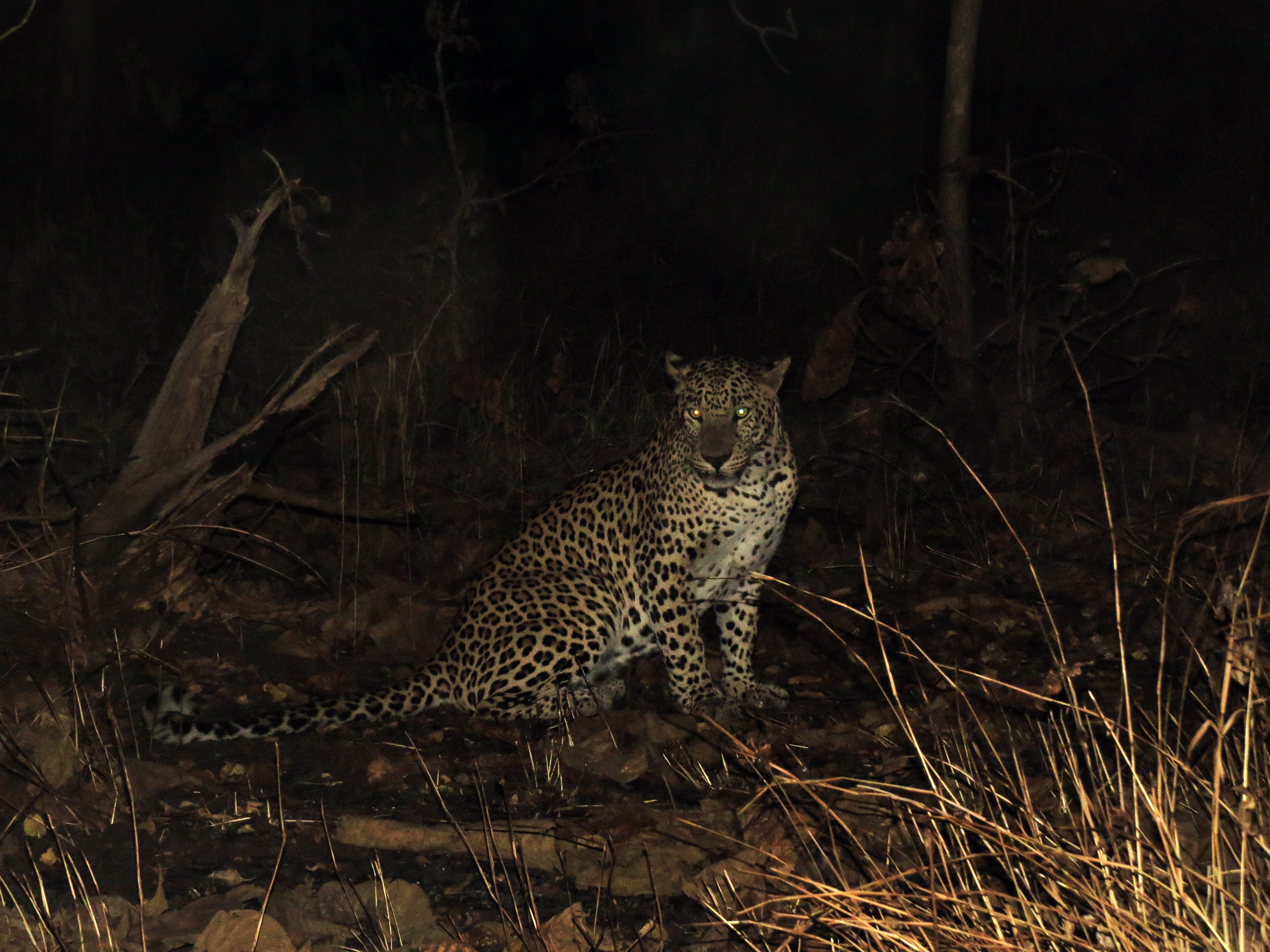
Indian leopard

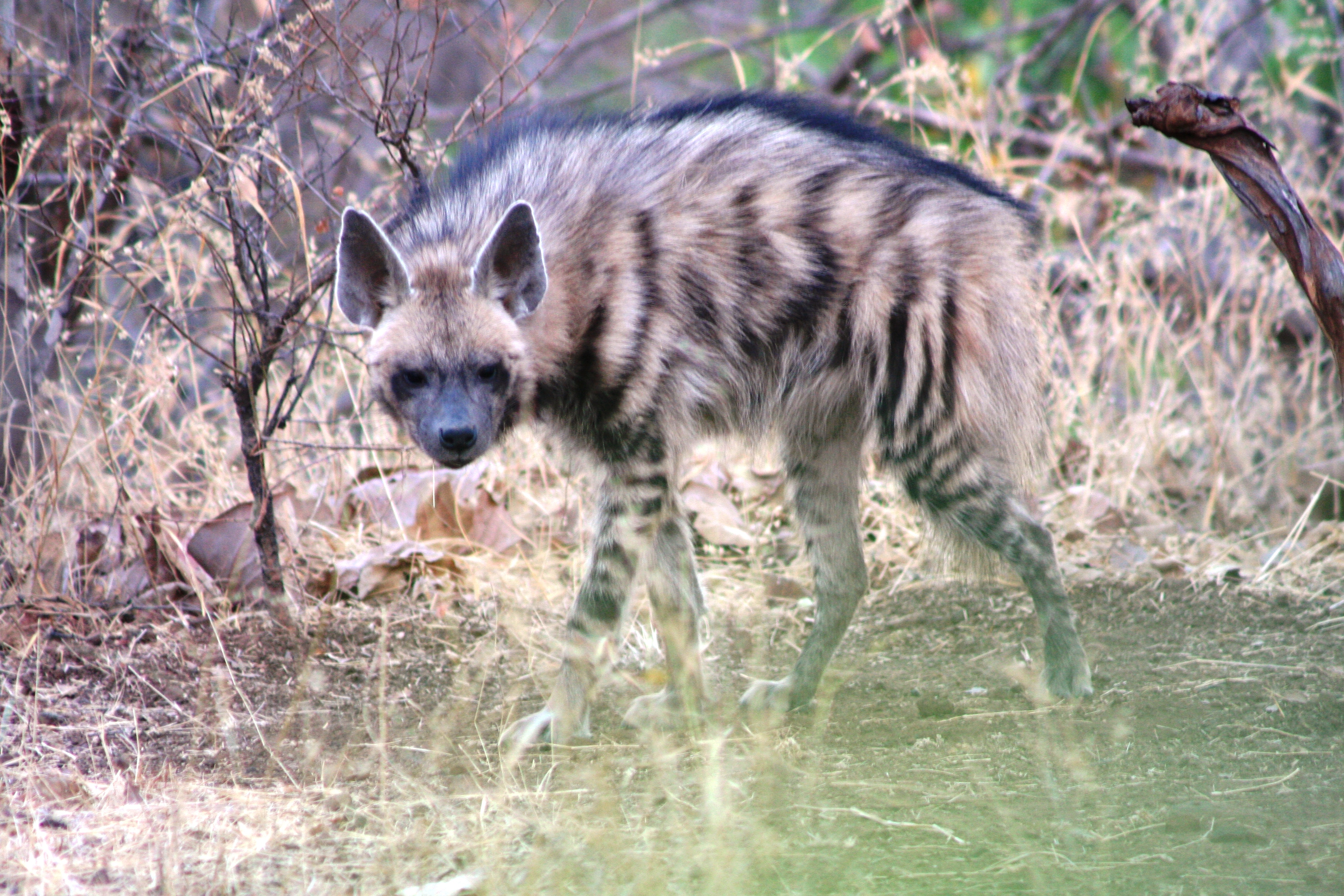
Striped hyena

The count of 2,375 distinct fauna species of Gir includes about 38 species of mammals, around 300 species of birds, 37 species of reptiles and more than 2,000 species of insects.

The carnivores group mainly comprises the Asiatic lion, Indian leopard, jungle cat, striped hyena, golden jackal, Bengal fox, Indian gray mongoose, ruddy mongoose, and honey badger. Asiatic wildcat and rusty-spotted cat occur, but are rarely seen.

The main herbivores of Gir are chital, nilgai, sambar, four-horned antelope, chinkara and wild boar. Blackbucks from the surrounding area are sometimes seen in the sanctuary.

The reptiles are represented by the mugger crocodile, Indian cobra, tortoise and monitor lizard which inhabit the sanctuary's bodies of water. Snakes are found in the bush and forest. Pythons are sighted at times along the stream banks. Gir has been used by the Gujarat State Forest Department which formed the Indian Crocodile Conservation Project in 1977 and released close to 1,000 mugger crocodile into Lake Kamaleshwar and other small bodies of water in and around Gir. Birds comprise more than 300 species, most of which are resident. The scavenger group of birds has six recorded species of vultures. Some of the typical species of Gir include crested serpent eagle, Bonelli's eagle, changeable hawk-eagle, brown fish owl, Indian eagle-owl, rock bush-quail, Indian peafowl, brown-capped pygmy woodpecker, black-headed oriole, crested treeswift and Indian pitta.

=== Asiatic lion ===
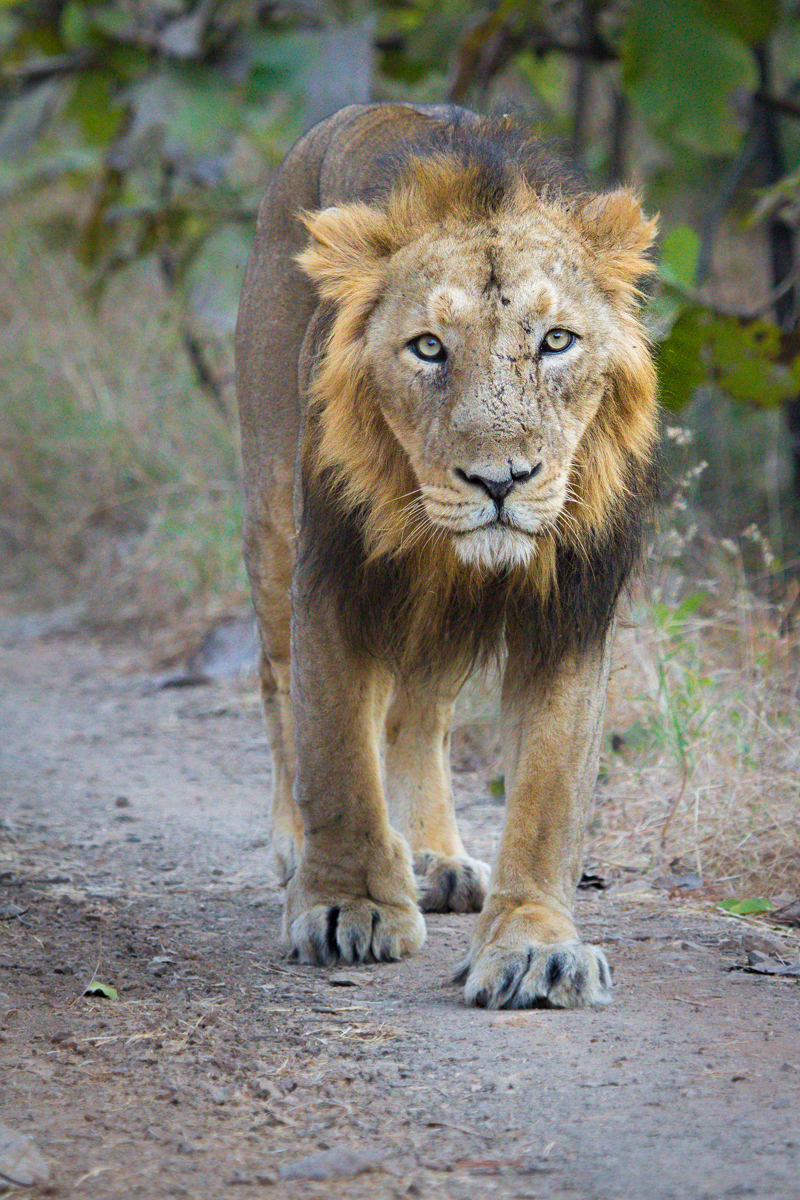
An Asiatic lion

The Asiatic lion's habitat is dry scrub land and open deciduous forest. The lion population increased from 411 individuals in 2010 to 674 in 2020, and all of them live in or around Gir National Park.

In 1900 it was estimated that the population was as low as 100, and the Asiatic lion was declared a protected species. A census in 1936 recorded 289 animals. The first modern-day count of lions was done by Mark Alexander Wynter-Blyth, the principal of Rajkumar College, Rajkot and R.S. Dharmakumarsinhji sometime between 1948 and 1963;

Even though the Gir Forest is well protected, there are instances of Asiatic lions being poached. They have also been poisoned in retaliation for attacking livestock. Some of the other threats include floods, fires and the possibility of epidemics and natural calamities. Gir nonetheless remains the most promising long-term preserve for them.

During a prolonged drought from 1899 to 1901, lions attacked livestock and people beyond the Gir Forest. After 1904, the rulers of Junagadh compensated livestock losses. Today, the lions in Gir National Park rarely attack people.

=== Lion conservation ===
Year	Count	Male:Female:Cubs
1968	177	-
1974	180	-
1979	261	76:100:100
1984	252	88:100:64
1990	249	82:100:67
1995	265	94:100:71
2000	327	99:115:76
2005	359	-
2010	411	97:162:152
2015	523	109:201:213
2020	674	277:260:137

The Lion Breeding Programme creates and maintains breeding centres. It also carries out studies of the behaviour of the Asiatic lions and also practices artificial insemination. One such centre has been established in the Sakkarbaug Zoo at the district headquarters of Junagadh, which has successfully bred about 180 lions. A total of 126 pure Asiatic lions have been given to zoos in India and abroad. The census of lions takes place every five years. Previously indirect methods like using pugmarks of the lion were adopted for the count. However, during the census of April 2005 (which originally was scheduled for 2006, but was advanced following the reports and controversy over vanishing tigers in India), "Block-Direct-Total Count" method was employed with the help of around 1,000 forest officials, experts and volunteers. It means that only those lions were counted that were "spotted" visually. Use of "live bait" (a prey that is alive and used as a bait) for the exercise, though thought to be a traditional practice, was not used this time. The reason believed to be behind this is the Gujarat High Court ruling of 2000 against such a use of animals.

During the 2010 census 'The Cat Women of Gir Forest' counted more than 411 lions in the park, and 523 in 2015. The women who do the counting are from traditional tribes in neighbouring villages.

=== Ecological problems ===
Gir National Park and Sanctuary faces a number of threats to its ecosystem. Natural threats include recurrent drought, cyclones, and forest fires. Anthropogenic threats include over-grazing, encroachment, excessive traffic and resultant weed infestation. Tourism contributes to this environmental degradation, as does the mining carried out in the periphery. Pollution results from the railway lines that run through the peripheral zone. The narrow genetic base in the large mammals is also an issue of growing concern.

== See also ==
- List of national parks and wildlife sanctuaries of Gujarat, India
- The Lion Queens of India
