= Lilapur, Rajkot =

Lilapur
- village
- Nickname: Galiyana
- Location in Gujarat, India Lilapur (India)
- Coordinates: 22.1403200°N 71.2691600°E
- Country: India
- State: Gujarat
- District: Rajkot

Languages
  - Official: Gujarati, Hindi
- Time zone: UTC+5:30 (IST)
- Vehicle registration: GJ
- Website: gujaratindia.com

Lilapur is a village in Jasdan Gujarat, India.
