= The Lion Queens of India =

US television mini-series

The Lion Queens of India is a 2015, four-part, documentary mini-series aired on the US television channel Animal Planet. The documentary tells the story of a group of women foresters who do animal rescue in Gir National Park.

In 2007 Guajarat became the first Indian state to employ women in its forest department, with a 33% quota. Although the initial idea was to place women in clerical and office roles, the women wanted to work in the field. In 2016 there were 46 women on the rescue team. They manage over 100 species and over 1,000 crocodiles, and conduct about two rescues a day. They are the only all-woman team that manages big cat wildlife anywhere in the world. They must also pursue and catch poachers.

== Cast ==
Rashilaben Vadher

Kiran Pithiya

Darshanaben (Darshana) Kagada

== Episodes ==
Episode 1: Rashilaben Vadher captures a lion cub and brings it back to the center for treatment. Kiran Pithiya and her team rescue a leopard from a farmer's house.

Episode 2: Rashilaben Vadher and her team capture an injured lioness and her 3 cubs. Kiran Pithiya and Darshanaben Kagada track a lion.

Episode 3: The foresters work to capture one of the world's most venomous snakes.

Episode 4: An injured lioness is darted and treated before her injury turns deadly.
