= Kamleshwar Dam =

Dam in Visavadar in gir somnath district

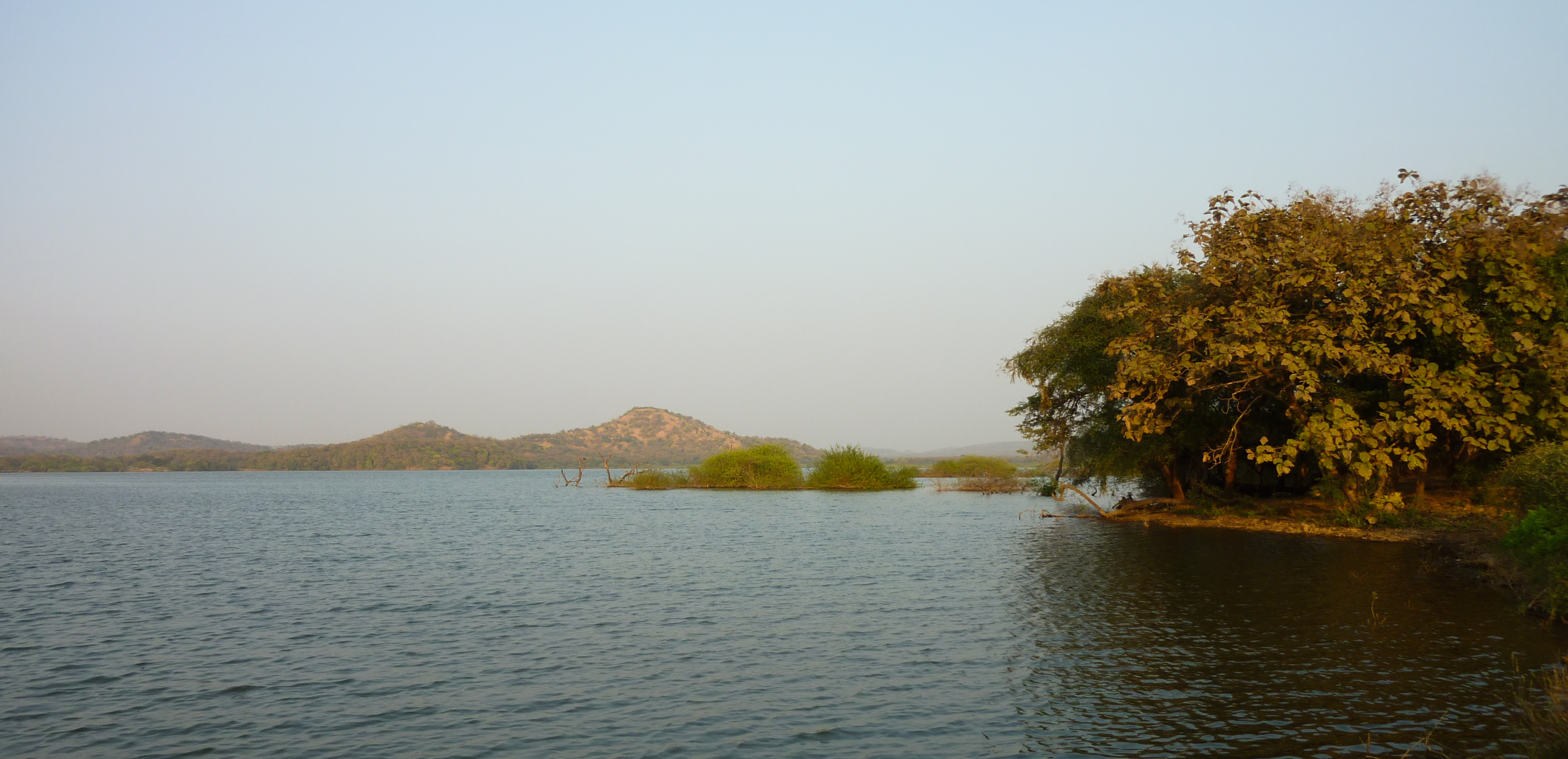
- Reservoir of the Kamleshwar Dam

- Location in Gujarat
- Interactive map of Kamleshwar Dam
- Official name: Hiran-I Dam
- Country: India
- Location: Visavadar
- Coordinates: 21°11′54″N 70°39′44″E
- Status: Operational
- Opening date: 1959

Dam and spillways
- Height: 25 m (82 ft)
- Length: 1,304 m (4,278 ft)
- Dam volume: 447,000 m^{3} (584,654 cu yd)
- Spillway capacity: 1,034 m (3,392 ft)

Reservoir
- Total capacity: 38,580,000 m^{3} (31,277 acre⋅ft)
- Active capacity: 35,020,000 m^{3} (28,391 acre⋅ft)
- Surface area: 8 km^{2} (3 sq mi)

The Kamleshwar Dam, officially known as the "Hiran-I Dam", is a rock-fill embankment dam on the Hiran River in Visavadar, Gujarat State, India. Measuring 764 ha (7,640,000 m^{2}), the dam is located within the Gir Forest National Park and was completed in 1959 for irrigation purposes. The reservoir created by the dam is known for its populations of birds and mugger crocodiles.
