= Aji River (Gujarat) =

River in India

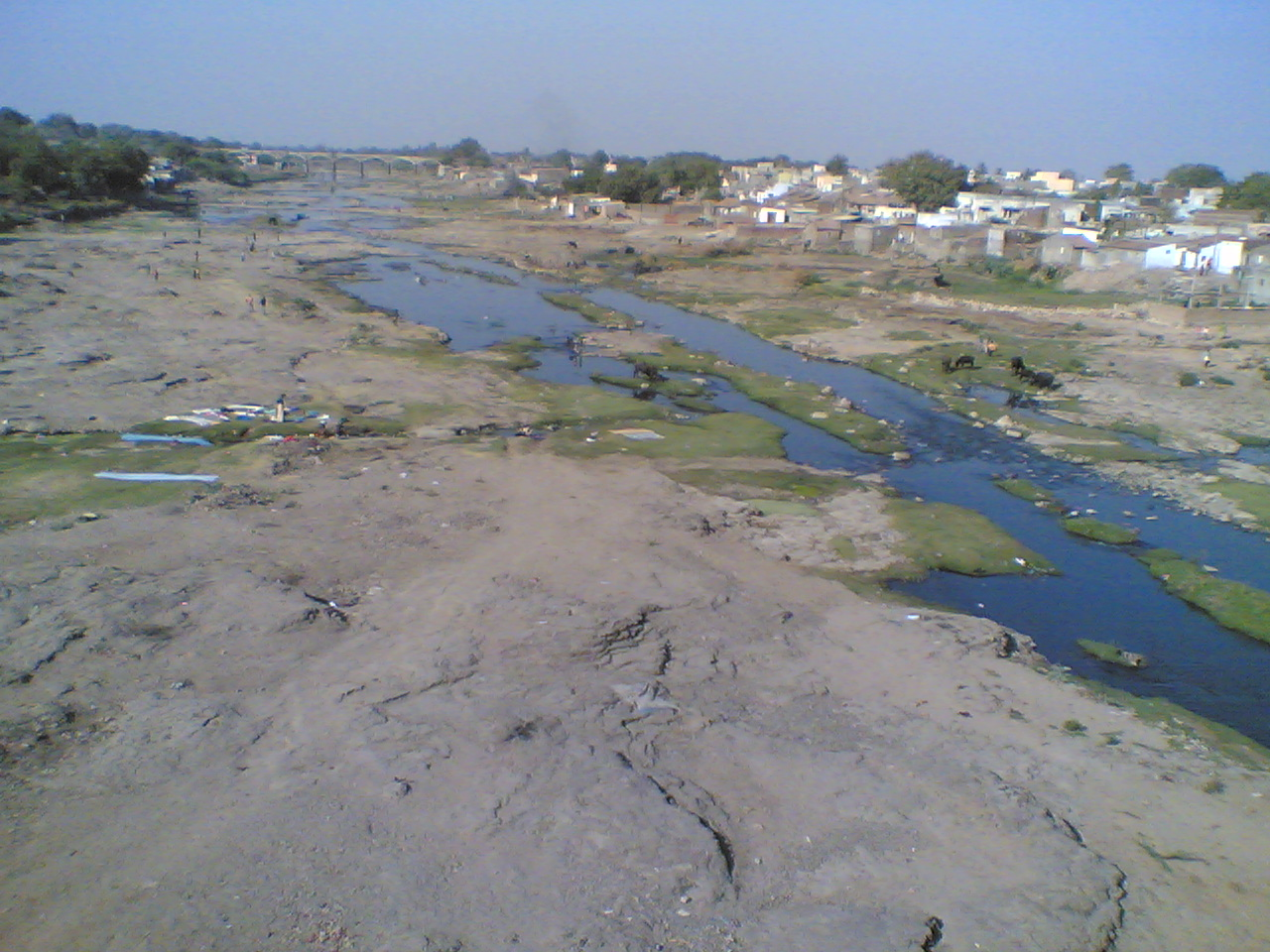
- View of river basin from railway bridge at Rajkot

Location
- Country: India
- State: Gujarat
- Region: Saurashtra
- District: Rajkot district, Jamnagar district
- City: Rajkot

Physical characteristics
- Source
  - location: Jasdan mountain range, Rajkot district, Gujarat, India
- Mouth: Gulf of Kutch, Arabian Sea
  - location: Ranjitpara, Jamnagar, Gujarat, India
  - coordinates: 22.9597139°N 70.438762°E
- Length: 164 km (102 mi)

Basin features
- Tributaries
  - left: Nyari River

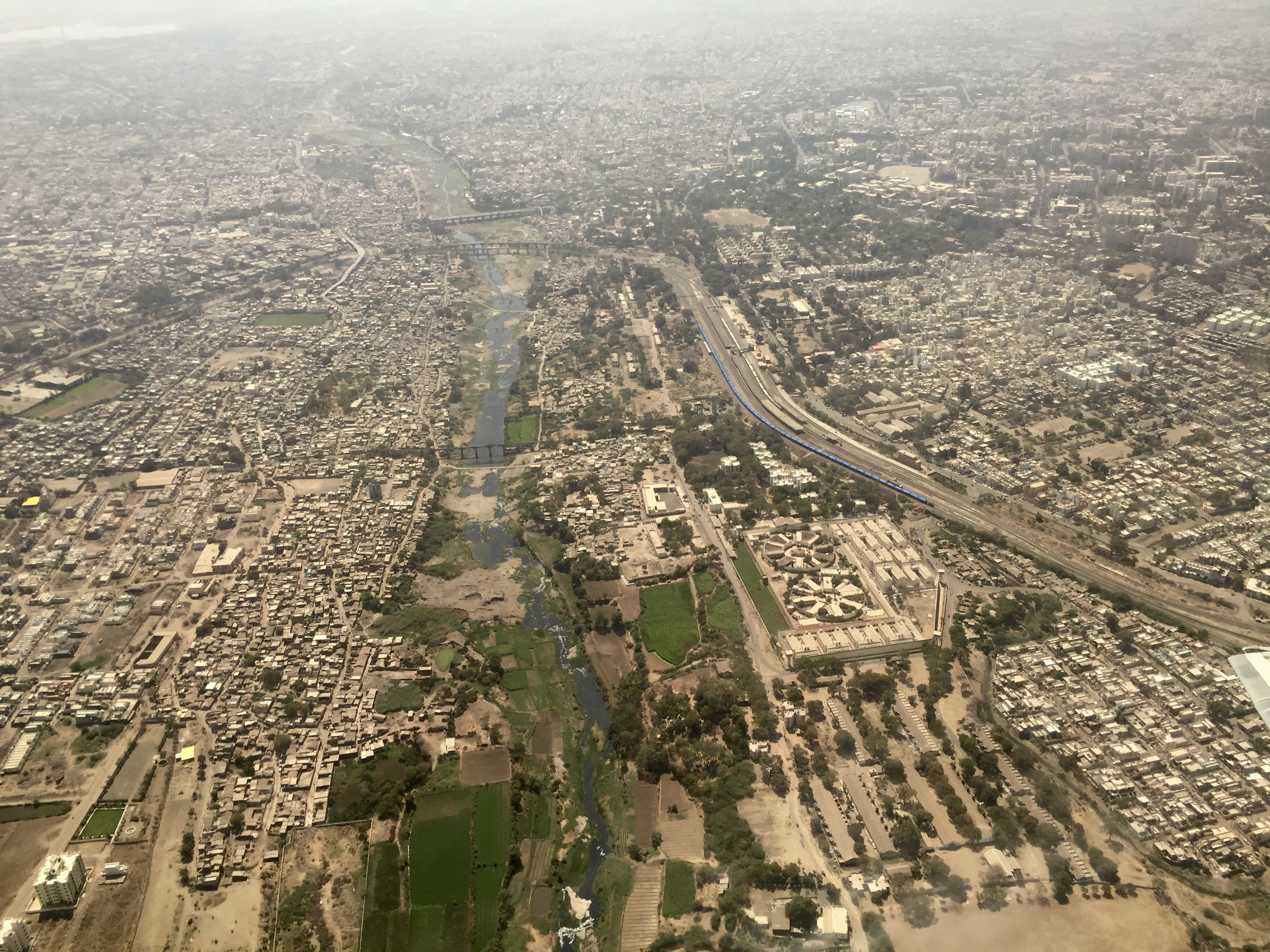
An Aerial Image of the Aji River flowing through Rajkot

The Aji River is one of the main rivers of the Saurashtra region in Gujarat, India. It separates Rajkot into east-west parts. There are four dams on the river, the water from which is used for agriculture and as drinking water.

== Reservoirs ==
- Rajkot - Aji I Reservoir
- Rajkot - Aji II Reservoir
- Padadhari - Aji III Reservoir
- Jodiya - Aji IV Reservoir

== Purification project ==
The Rajkot Municipal Corporation has started a project for the purification of Aji River and to provide retaining walls and plantations at both ends. Originating from the hilly areas of Sardhar and Hingolgadh, it has a length of 250 km and flows into the Gulf of Kutch. Some of the major tributaries of Aji are the Nyari, Khokaldadi, Bhankudi & Dondi rivers originating from the hills of Sardhar near Atkot. There are major irrigation projects on Aji, but none of them support any canal systems for irrigation.

In June 2017, Prime Minister Narendra Modi inaugurated the filling of the Aji dam near Rajkot under Saurashtra Narmada Avtaran Irrigation (SAUNI).
