= Malana, Khyber Pakhtunkhwa =

Coordinates: 31°44′32″N 70°51′50″E

Malana (ملانہ), Khyber-Pakhtunkhwa Pakka Malana
- Town and union council
- Interactive map of Malana (ملانہ), Khyber-Pakhtunkhwa
- Country: Pakistan
- Province: Khyber Pakhtunkhwa
- District: Dera Ismail Khan District
- Time zone: UTC+5 (PST)

Malana (ملانہ)is a historical village in the southeast side about 12 km from the city of Dera Ismail Khan in the Khyber Pakhtunkhwa province of Pakistan. It is a union council in the Paroa Tehsil, in the district and division Dera Ismail Khan. It is divided into two localities, Pakka Malana and Kacha Malana. Pakka Malana is the main village of the union council Malana. It is the union council of Dera Ismail Khan District. It is located at 31°44'32N 70°51'50E and has an altitude of 135 metres (446 feet). The town is sometimes mistaken for another city, Malana in India, but these two places are distinct from each other.

Most residents belong to the Deobandi sect of the Hanafi school of Sunni Islam. Malana is a combination of many clans. Clans living in Malana Pakka include Chauhan, Mahota, Khokhar, Mughal, Siyal, Machi, Baloch, Gazar, Araen, Lohar, Awan, Bhatti, Chena, Malana, Dhawa, Bhutta and Kat. Well-known politicians of the past were Sardar Abdur Rehman Khan Baloch (BHANI), Sardar Aziz Ur Rehman Khan, and Sardar Latif Ur Rehman Khan, sons of Abdur Rehman. Current politicians include Shahid latif Khan Baloch (District Member), Dr. Khalid Aziz Baloch, Tariq Aziz Baloch(Late), Zahid Latif Baloch and Sajid Latif Baloch.
