= Lilapur, Surendranagar =

Lilapur
- village
- Location in Gujarat, India Lilapur (India)
- Coordinates: 22°55′50″N 71°49′50″E
- Country: India
- State: Gujarat
- District: Surendranagar
- Talukas: lakhatar
  - Density: 3,000/km^{2} (7,800/sq mi)

Languages
  - Official: Gujarati, Hindi
- Time zone: UTC+5:30 (IST)
- PIN: 382775
- Telephone code: lilapur
- Vehicle registration: GJ-13
- Nearest city: lakhatar
- Sex ratio: 2:3 ♂/♀
- Literacy: 80 %%
- Climate: nice (Köppen)
- Website: gujaratindia.com

Lilapur is a village in Surendranagar district, Gujarat, India.

Lilapur is the village located at Lakhtar Taluka, District - Surendranagar, Gujarat, India. The territory lies into the area as per the older Royal state name.
