= Kharasrota River =

River in Odisha, India

- Location within Odisha

Location
- Country: India
- State: Odisha

Physical characteristics
- Mouth: Brahmani River
  - coordinates: 20.663°N 86.748°E

The Kharasrota is a river that flows in Odisha state of India. It is a tributary of the Brahmani River.

== See also ==
- Brahmani River
