= Yapola River =

River in India

Coordinates: 34.3322°N 76.8371°E

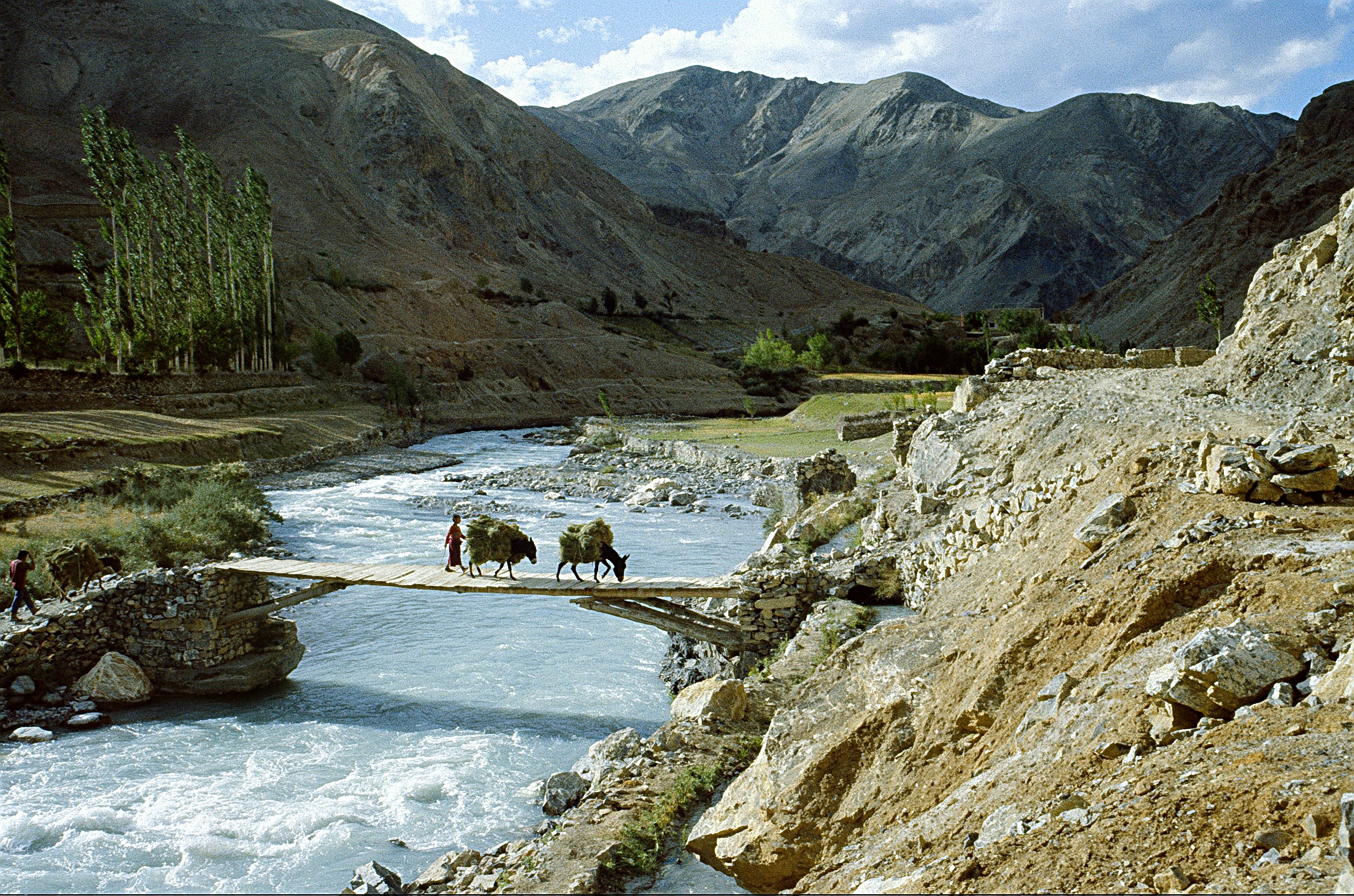
The river at the village of Wanla

The Gyapo-La, also known as the Wanla River, is a river near Khalsi. It flows into the Indus River near Lamayuru. It is in the Ladakh region on India. It is known as Wanla River because people can see it flow through the village Wanla. This river flows through beautiful gorges and the views around it are scenic. The area is a part of Himalayas. The length of the river is not confirmed, but it is around 55 kilometer (34 miles) long. The area around it is very dry, and you would not see any forests. There are hardly any grasses and shrubs around it. Along the river, you might see willow and poplar trees.

People grow crops in small areas around river where they can get areas. The common crops of the area include barley and potato, some vegetables are also grown in the area.

The Wanla monastery is located on the bank of the river.
