= Parbati River (Rajasthan) =

River in India

Location
- Country: India
- State: Rajasthan and Madhya Pradesh

Physical characteristics
- Source: Pithapura Lake near Siddikganj
  - location: Vindhya Range in Sehore District in Madhya Pradesh
  - coordinates: 22°50′05″N 76°35′59″E
- Mouth: Chambal River
  - location: National Chambal Sanctuary near Palin village Sawai Madhopur District in Rajasthan
  - coordinates: 25°50′49″N 76°33′55″E

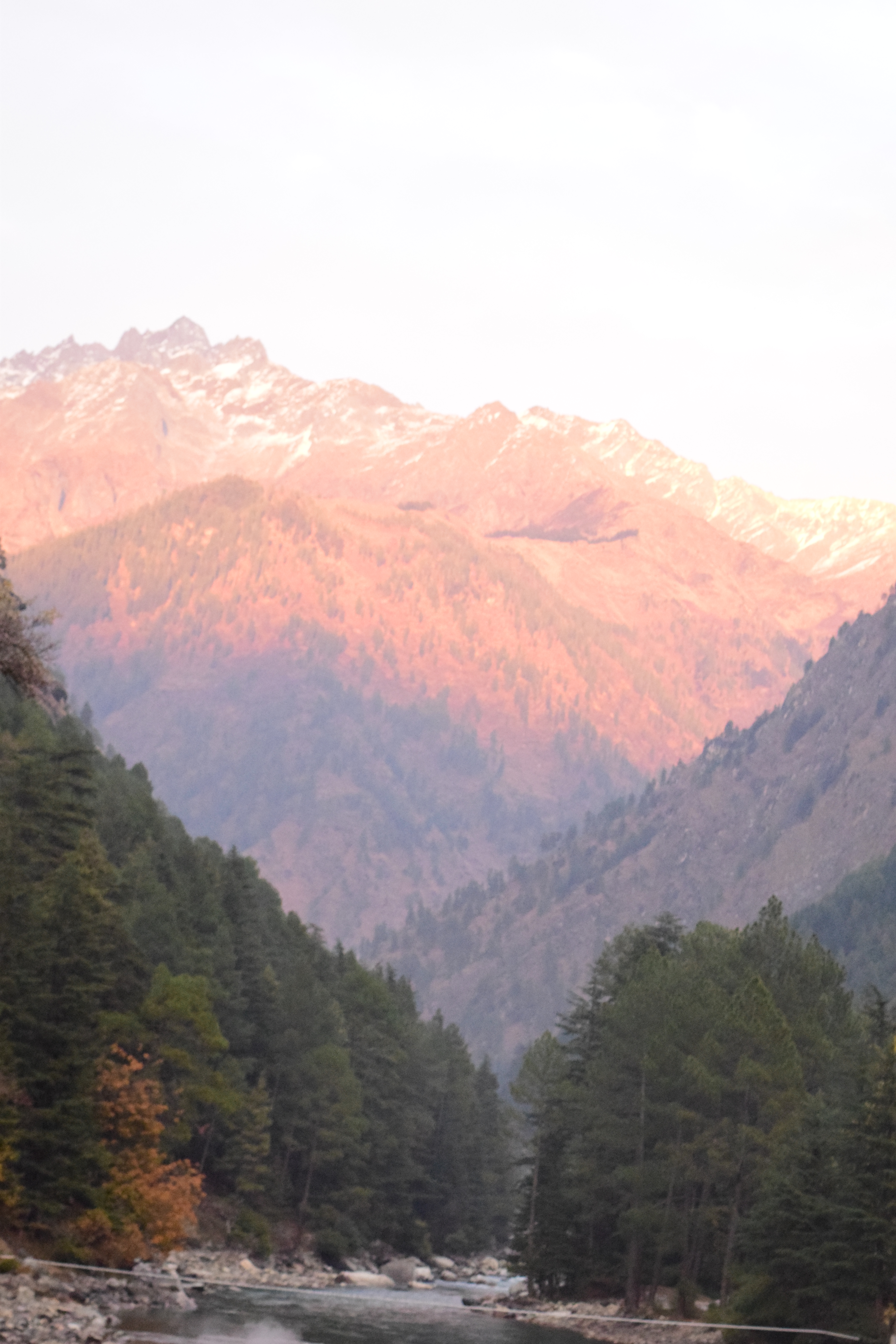

Parbati River is a river in Madhya Pradesh and Rajasthan, India, that flows into the Chambal River.

The 800-MW Parbati Hydro Electric Project–II (PHEP-II) near Kullu, neared completion as per reports in March 2025 and it is expected it would reduce the floods in the Parbati river, from Barshaini in the Manikaran valley to Bhuntar.

An interlinking of rivers (ILR) project was under proposal to construct Mahalpur Barrage on Parbati River.

A study looked into the hydrological patterns in the Kalisindh and Parbati Rivers and said that the Eastern Rajasthan Canal Project (ERCP) is pivotal for improving the regional water security.
