= Bhadar River =

Bhadar
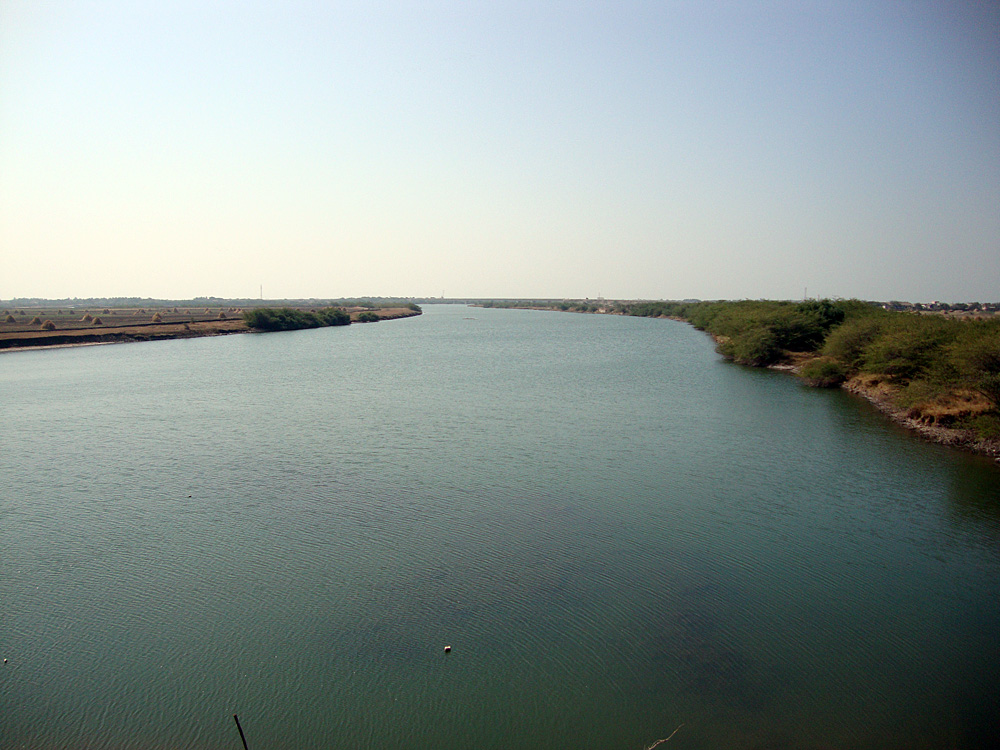
- Bhadar River (Near Navi Bandar, Porbandar)

Location
- Country: India
- State: Gujarat

Physical characteristics
- Source
  - location: Jasdan, India
  - coordinates: 22.015546°N 71.204900°E
  - elevation: 210 m (690 ft)
- Mouth
  - location: Navi Bandar, India
  - coordinates: 21.452534°N 69.790494°E
  - elevation: 0 m (0 ft)
- Length: 200 km (120 mi)
- Basin size: 12,386 km^{2} (4,782 sq mi)
- Discharge
  - location: Navi Bandar

Bhadar River is a river in the Saurashtra peninsula, in the Western Indian state of Gujarat. It flows south from its origin through Jasdan, then turns south-west and generally west until it empties into the Arabian Sea near Porbandar. The total catchment area of the basin is 7,094 square kilometres (2,739 sq mi).

It is impounded by two reservoirs, Bhadar-I reservoir with a capacity of 238,000,000 cubic metres (193,000 acre⋅ft), and downstream from that, Bhadar-II reservoir with a capacity of 49,000,000 cubic metres (40,000 acre⋅ft).

Gondali, Chapparwadi, Phopal, Utawadi, Moj and Venu are right bank tributaries and Vasavadi, Surwa and Galolio are left bank tributaries of the river.
