= Lilapur, Ahmadabad =

Lilapur
- village
- Location in Gujarat, India Lilapur (India)
- Coordinates: 23.1373°N 72.5110900°E
- Country: India
- State: Gujarat
- District: Ahmedabad

Languages
  - Official: Gujarati, Hindi
- Time zone: UTC+5:30 (IST)
- Vehicle registration: GJ
- Website: gujaratindia.com

Lilapur is a village in Ahmedabad district, Gujarat, India.
