= Parachinar Malana =

Village in Kurram District, Khyber Pakhtunkhwa, Pakistan

Malana is a small village of Kurram Agency, Pakistan. It is located north of the main city Parachinar. Parachinar is the capital of Kurram Agency where the Political Administration offices are located. Malana village is divided into two parts by a small rainy canal called Malana Horr and remains dry throughout the year but during rainy season the rainy water flows through Malana Horr.
