= Minsar =

Former Indian enclave in Tibet

Minsar Moincêr
- village
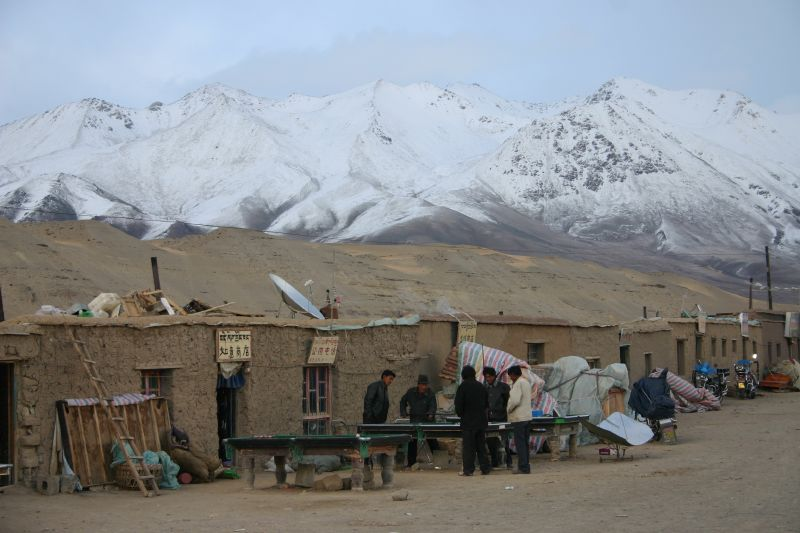

- Location within Tibet
- Coordinates: 31.18°N 80.76°E
- Country: China
- Region: Tibet Autonomous Region
- Prefecture: Ngari
- County: Gar

Minsar or Moincêr (Note: Alternative spellings: Missar, and Menze.) (Tibetan: མོན་འཚེར, Wylie: mon 'tsher, THL: mön tser) or Menshi (Chinese: 门士; pinyin: Mén shì) is a village and the centre of a township in the Ngari Prefecture of the Tibet region of China. Between 1684 and 1950s, it was a treaty enclave of Kingdom of Ladakh, which later in 1846 became princely state of Jammu and Kashmir under British suzerainty. Since late 1950s, it has been administered by Tibet Autonomous Region, China.

Minsar is located south-west of Mount Kailash (Mount Ti-se). It is close to the Tirthapuri Monastery on the bank of the Sutlej River. The Chinese National Highway G219 passes by Minsar.

== History ==
Prior to the Tibet–Ladakh–Mughal War (1679–1684), the Kingdom of Ladakh controlled the whole of the Ngari region (present day western Tibet). Central Tibet, consolidated by the Fifth Dalai Lama, conquered and occupied Ngari, but was driven back from Ladakh proper by the forces of the Mughal Empire from Kashmir. (Note: At the time of the war, Ladakh was formally a vassal state of the Mughal Empire via Kashmir, even though the vassalage was not ardently observed.) Lhasa sent the sixth Drukchen from Bhutan, Gyalwang Mipham Wangpo to negotiate truce terms with Ladakh. In the resulting Treaty of Tingmosgang, Ladakh agreed to cede the whole of western Tibet to Lhasa retaining only a tract around Minsar for supporting the worship at Mount Kailas.

Minsar appears to have been used for porterage for the Ladakhi trade caravans to Tibet.

== Economy ==
Minsar depends on its small coal-mining industry; from which it once produced large amounts of ore from its nearby mines. The village is small and its villagers live depending heavily on yaks for agriculture and trade.

== Gallery ==
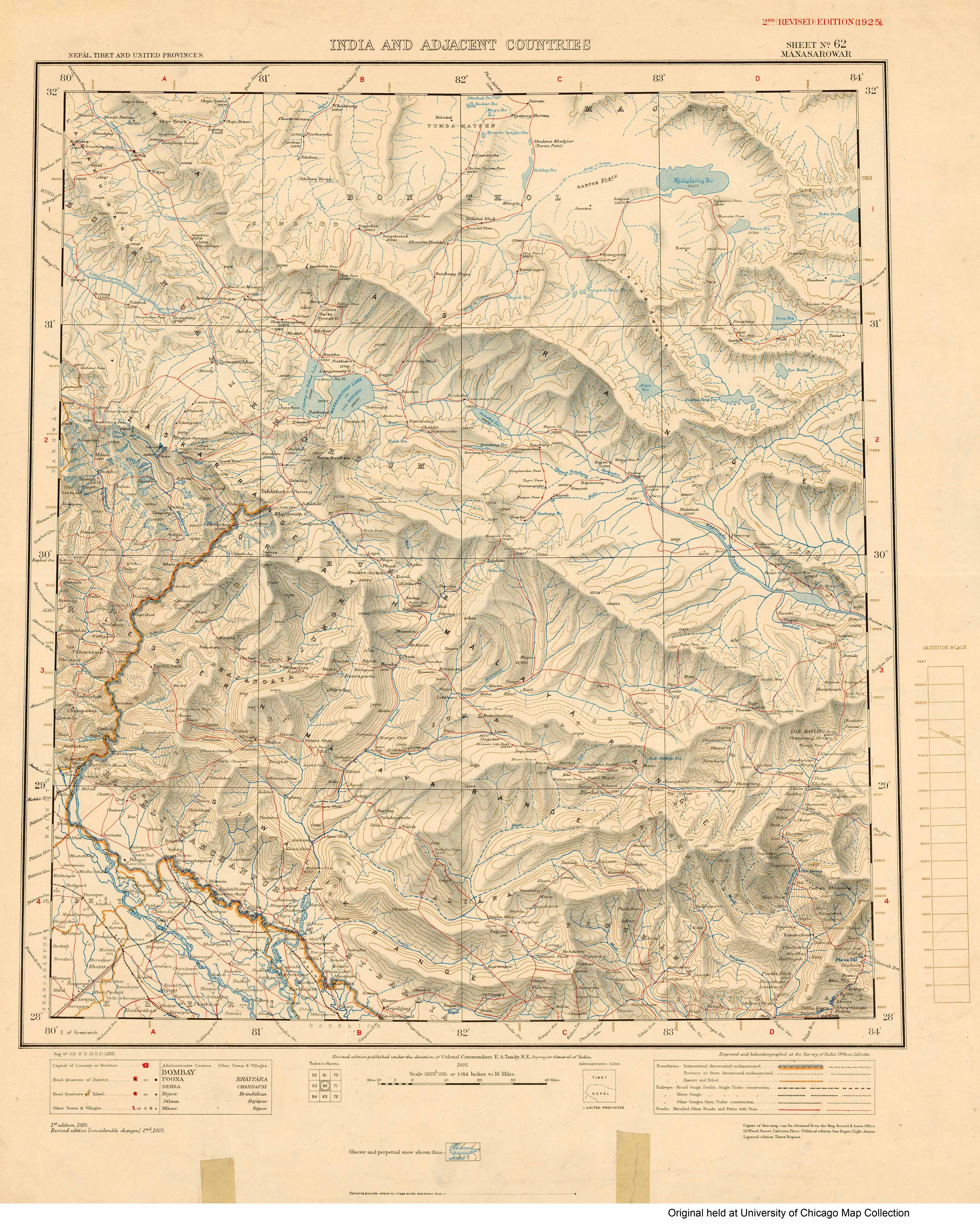
Map including Minsar ("Menze or Missar") and Tirthapuri Gompa

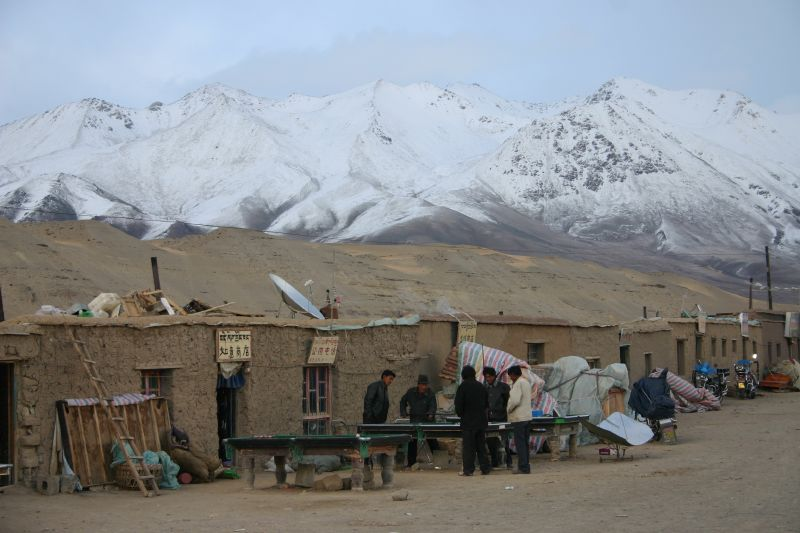
A side street of Moincêr

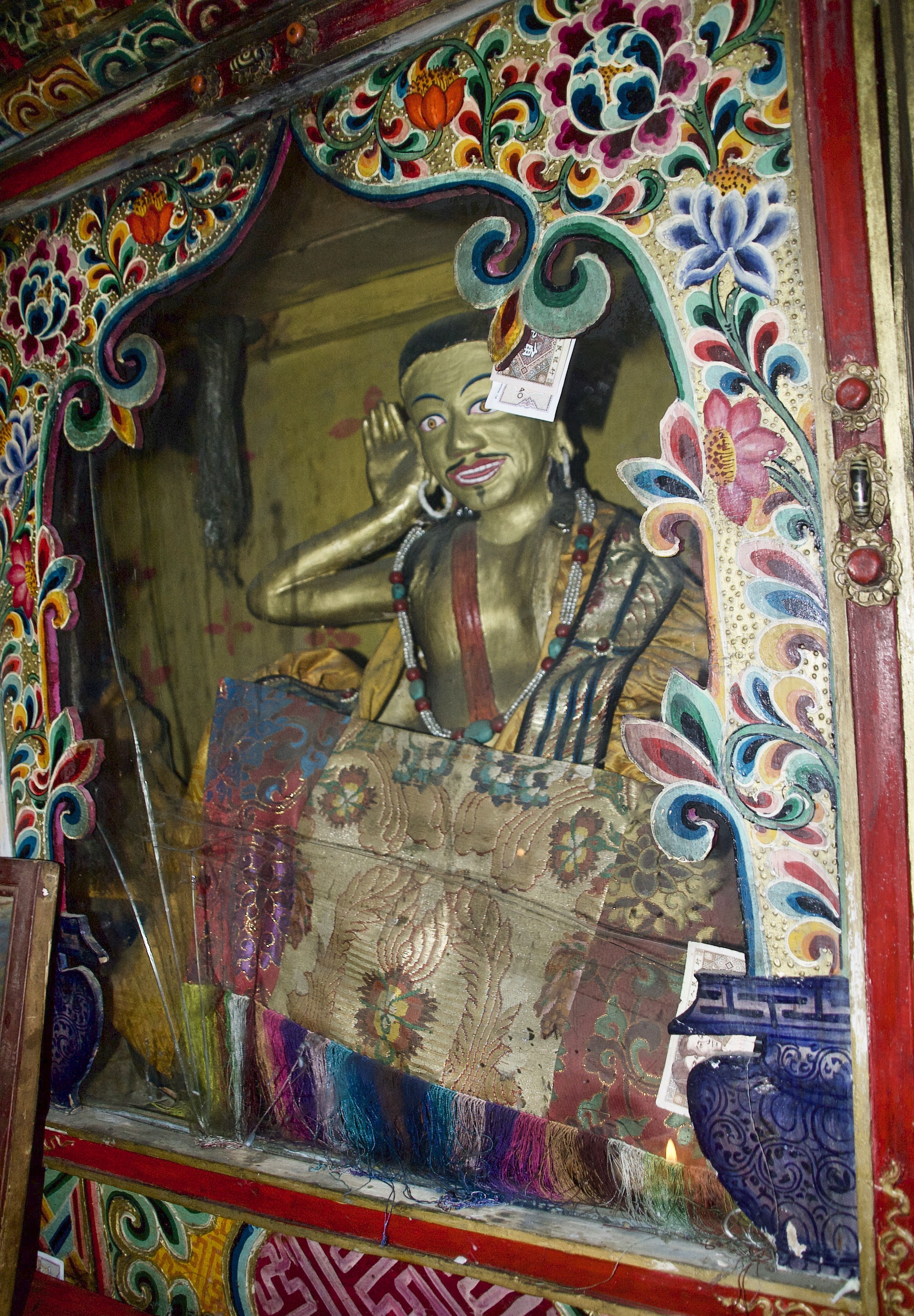
Statue of Milarepa in Tirthapuri Gompa

== Bibliography ==
- Bray, John (2003), "Ladakh! and Bhutanese Enclaves in Tibet", in Alex McKay (ed.), History of Tibet, Volume 3: The Encounter with Modernity: c.1895-1959, Routledge, pp. 191–201, ISBN 0-415-30844-5 – via archive.org
- Fisher, Margaret W.; Rose, Leo E.; Huttenback, Robert A. (1963), Himalayan Battleground: Sino-Indian Rivalry in Ladakh, Praeger, pp. 125–126 – via archive.org

== See also ==
- List of towns and villages in Tibet
