= Wagh River =

Coordinates: 22°08′N 74°49′E

Daman Ganga River divides the Daman town of Goa into two, the northern region, known as Nani Daman (Little Daman) and the southern region, known as Moti Daman (Big Daman). It originates in the ghat which is 64 km from the Goan coast and it merges in the Arabian Sea at the port of Daman. It is known as the Wagh River in Raite. Silvasa town is situated on the banks of this river.
