= Lilapur, Uttar Pradesh =

Lilapur
- village
- Location in Uttar Pradesh, India Lilapur (India)
- Coordinates: 25.91°N 81.82°E
- Country: India
- State: Uttar Pradesh
- District: Pratapgarh

Government
  - Body: Gram panchayat

Languages
  - Official: Hindi
- Time zone: UTC+5:30 (IST)
- Vehicle registration: UP
- Website: up.gov.in

Lilapur is a village in Pratapgarh district, Uttar Pradesh, India
