= Lilapur Kalan =

Lilapur Lilapur Kalan
- village
- Location in Uttar Pradesh, India Lilapur (India)
- Coordinates: 25.47°N 83.44°E
- Country: India
- State: Uttar Pradesh
- District: Prayagraj

Languages
  - Official: Hindi
- Time zone: UTC+5:30 (IST)

Lilapur Kalan is a village located approximately 25 km from the Prayagraj and approximately 12 km from Hanumanganj, on the NH 2.

== Geography ==
The village is situated on the banks of river Ganges. The village is populated by nearly 6000 inhabitants. The crop production and animal husbandry are the main sources of livelihood of the villagers. Adjoining villages include Jamunipur, Lilapur Khurd, Kotwa, Katwarupur. It was one of the earliest electrified villages in India. The railway station Ramnathpur on Prayagraj to Varanasi route is near Hanumanganj. The large tract of Kachhar area, and mostly the babool trees are found here. The intermediate college is at Jamunipur and kotwa and a PG college (Nehru Gram Bharti) also in Jamunipur. The temple of Maharshi Durvasa, on the River Ganges is close to the sages durvasa which was once believed to have stayed.

This village is highly affected by the soil erosion caused by River Ganga during monsoon season. Every year it causes a loss of about 50 Ha of arable and fertile land. The greatest need of this village is pitching of Bank of river Ganga so that soil erosion can be avoided, and it can save the livelihood of the villagers those dependent on crop production only.

== History ==
The village is also known for the curse of Lila Baba for that no dead is cremated from this village. The Pipal tree situated on the river banks has a small temple of the Lila baba. There is an interesting story related to the lila baba who died of protest against the jamindar of the village, whom he cursed and that proved true within a period of fortnight and the entire family of the landlord died. Later lila baba left the physical body due fasting as he took no food. Curse is just a myth, people need to fill the gap between rituals and truth for their own good.
