= Gajansar River =

Gajansar

Location
- Country: India
- State: Gujarat

Physical characteristics
- Source
  - location: India
- Mouth
  - location: Arabian Sea, India
- Length: 37 km (23 mi)
- Discharge
  - location: Arabian Sea

Gajansar River is a river in western India in Gujarat whose origin is near the village of Vigodi. Its drainage basin has a maximum length of 37 km. The total catchment area of the basin is 159 km2.
