= Sai River (Gujarat) =

Sai

Location
- Country: India
- State: Gujarat

Physical characteristics
- Source
  - location: India
- Mouth
  - location: Gulf of Kutch, Arabian Sea, India
- Length: 25 km (16 mi)
- Discharge
  - location: Arabian Sea

Sai River is a river in western India in Gujarat whose origin is near Reha village of Kutch. The other villages through which the river flows are Wandh, Kapadisar, Kadoli and Kotadi. Its drainage basin has a maximum length of 25 kilometres (16 mi). The total catchment area of the basin is 44 square kilometres (17 mi^{2}).
