= Bhurud River =

Bhurud

Location
- Country: India
- State: Gujarat

Physical characteristics
- Source
  - location: India
- Mouth
  - location: Arabian Sea, India
- Length: 50 km (31 mi)
- Discharge
  - location: Arabian Sea

Bhurud River is a river in western India in Gujarat whose origin is Near Chavdka Adhochhni village. Its basin has a maximum length of 50 km. The total catchment area of the basin is 326 km2.
