= Sukhbhadar River =

Sukhbhadar

Location
- Country: India
- State: Gujarat

Physical characteristics
- Source
  - location: India
- Mouth
  - location: Arabian Sea, India
- Length: 194 km (121 mi)
- Discharge
  - location: Arabian Sea

Sukhbhadar River is a river in western India in Gujarat whose origin is Vadi hills. Its basin has a maximum length of 194 km. The total catchment area of the basin is 2118 km^{2}.
