= Machchundri River =

Machchundri

Location
- Country: India
- State: Gujarat

Physical characteristics
- Source
  - location: India
- Mouth
  - location: Arabian Sea, India
- Length: 59 km (37 mi)
- Discharge
  - location: Arabian Sea

Machchundri River is a river in Gujarat, Western India. It originates from Gir Forest and meets in Arabian Sea. The maximum length of the river is 59 km and its total catchment area is approx. 406 km2.
