= Chok River =

Chok

Location
- Country: India
- State: Gujarat

Physical characteristics
- Source
  - location: India
- Mouth
  - location: Arabian Sea, India
- Length: 20 km (12 mi)
- Discharge
  - location: Arabian Sea

Chok River is a river in western India in Gujarat whose origin is Near Kalarvadh. Its basin has a maximum length of 20 km. The total catchment area of the basin is 63 km2.
