= Mitiyativali River =

Mitiyativali

Location
- Country: India
- State: Gujarat
- Region: Kutch
- District: Kutch district

Physical characteristics
- Source
  - location: India
- Mouth
  - location: Kori creek, Arabian Sea, India
- Length: 20 km (12 mi)
- Discharge
  - location: Arabian Sea

Mitiyativali River is a river in western India in Gujarat whose origin is Near Mitiyati village. Its basin has a maximum length of 20 km. The total catchment area of the basin is 165.75 km^{2}.
