= Und River =

Coordinates: 22°41′N 70°18′E

UND उंड
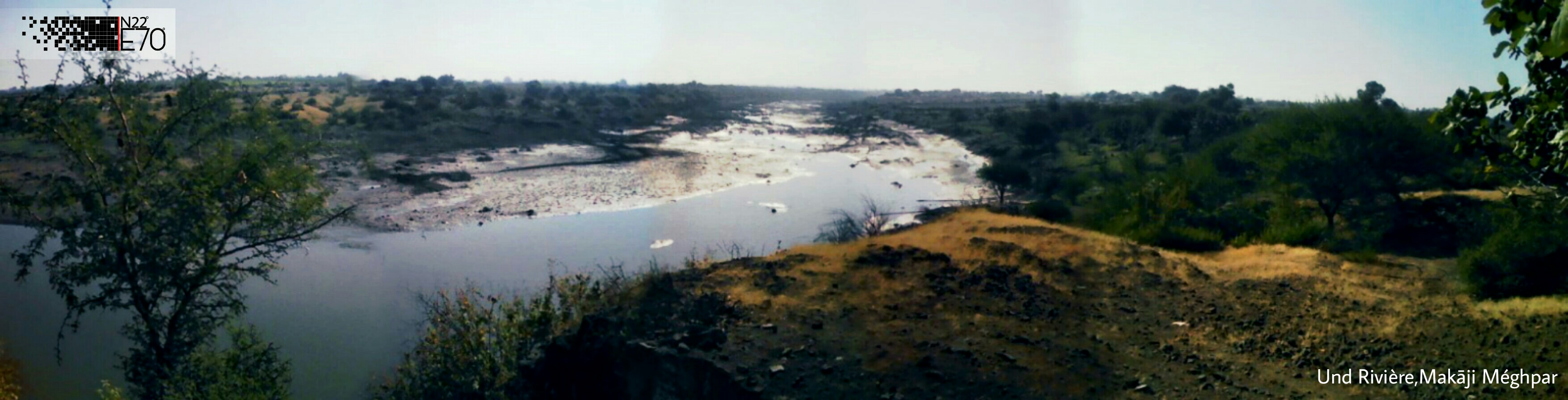
- Panoramic view of Und river at Makaji Meghpar
- Native name: ઉંડ (Gujarati)

Location
- Country: India
- State: Gujarat
- Region: Saurashtra

Physical characteristics
- Length: 80 km (50 mi)
- Basin size: 1,615km²
- Discharge
  - maximum: 1410.00 m³/sec.

Und River is a river in western India in Gujarat whose origin is Lodhika Ridge. Its basin has a maximum length of 80 km. The total catchment area of the basin is 1,615 square kilometres (624 sq mi).
