= Rupen River (Gir) =

Rupen

Location
- Country: India
- State: Gujarat

Physical characteristics
- Source
  - location: India
- Mouth
  - location: Arabian Sea, India
- Length: 75 km (47 mi)
- Discharge
  - location: Arabian Sea

Rupen River is a river in western India in Saurashtra peninsula of Gujarat whose origin is Gir Forest. Its basin has a maximum length of 156 km. The total catchment area of the basin is 2500 km^{2}.
