= Fulki River =

- Location within Gujarat Location within India

Location
- Country: India
- State: Gujarat

Physical characteristics
- Source
  - location: India
  - coordinates: 22°44′46″N 70°47′36″E
- Mouth
  - location: Arabian Sea, India
  - coordinates: 22°57′49″N 70°26′45″E
- Length: 18 km (11 mi)
- Discharge
  - location: Arabian Sea

Fulki River (Falki River) is a river in western India in Gujarat whose origin is near the village of Lilpar. Its drainage basin has a maximum length of 18 km. The total catchment area of the basin is 120 km2.
