= Padalio River =

Padalio

Location
- Country: India
- State: Gujarat

Physical characteristics
- Source
  - location: India
- Mouth
  - location: Arabian Sea, India
- Length: 110 km (68 mi)
- Discharge
  - location: Arabian Sea

Padalio River is a river in western India in Gujarat whose origin is Khambhaliya hills. Its drainage basin has a maximum length of 110 km. The total catchment area of the basin is 345 square kilometres (133 sq mi).
