= Par River (Gujarat) =

Par
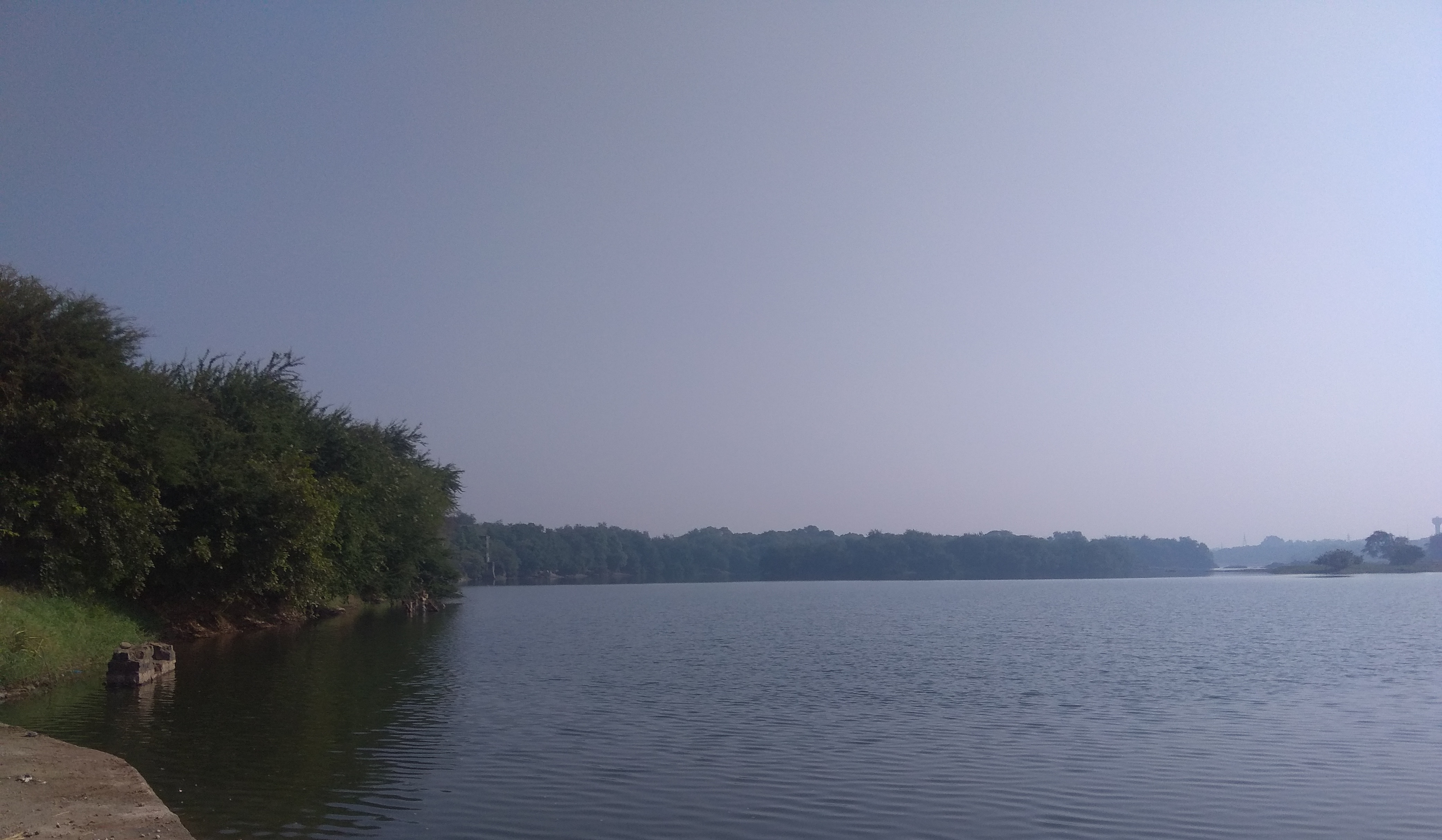
- Par River

Location
- Country: India
- State: Gujarat

Physical characteristics
- Source: Paykhad, Maharashtra
  - location: India
- Mouth
  - location: Arabian Sea, India
  - coordinates: 20°32′01″N 72°53′11″E
- Length: 51 km (32 mi)
- Basin size: 907 km^{2} (350 sq mi)
- Discharge
  - location: Arabian Sea

Par River is a river in Gujarat in western India with its source near wadpada village in Nashik Maharashtra. Its drainage basin has a maximum length of 51 km. The total catchment area of the basin is 907 square kilometres (350 sq mi). It flows from Valsad district and into the Arabian Sea. There is a small town Killa Pardi, which it passes near. The British constructed a bridge on this river while they ruled India. Atul Industries was established on the Parnera hills side of the river.
