= Sangavadi River =

Sangavadi

Location
- Country: India
- State: Gujarat

Physical characteristics
- Source
  - location: India
- Mouth
  - location: Arabian Sea, India
- Length: 38 km (24 mi)
- Discharge
  - location: Arabian Sea

Sangavadi River is a river in western India in Gujarat whose origin is Gir forest. Its drainage basin has a maximum length of 38 km. The total catchment area of the basin is 576 km2.
