= Kali River (Anas) =

Kali

Location
- Country: India
- State: Gujarat

Physical characteristics
- Source
  - location: India
- Mouth
  - location: Arabian Sea, India
- Length: 40 km (25 mi)
- Discharge
  - location: Arabian Sea

Kali River is a river in western India in Gujarat whose origin is Near Ravleshvar village. Its basin has a maximum length of 40 km. The total catchment area of the basin is 147 square kilometres (57 sq mi).
