= Vighodi =

Panchayat village in Gujarat, India

Vighodi Vigodi
- Village
- Location in Gujarat, India Vighodi (India)
- Coordinates: 23°29′47″N 069°05′16″E
- Country: India
- State: Gujarat
- District: Kutch
- Taluka: Nakhatrana

Government
  - Type: Panchayati raj (India)
  - Body: Gram panchayat
- Time zone: UTC+5:30 (IST)
- PIN: 370605
- Vehicle registration: GJ
- Lok Sabha constituency: Kachchh
- Vidhan Sabha constituency: Abdasa
- Website: gujaratindia.com

Vighodi (Vigodi) is a panchayat village in Gujarat, India. Administratively it is under Nakhatrana Taluka, Kutch District, Gujarat. Vighodi lies along Gujarat State Highway 42 between the villages of Rawapur to the northwest and Ratadiya to the east-southeast.

There is only one village in the Vighodi gram panchayat: namely Vighodi.

== Demographics ==
In the 1964 census the village of Vighodi had 2,115 inhabitants, but by the 2011 census, the village had only 1,288 inhabitants, with 678 males (52.6%) and 610 females (47.4%), for a gender ratio of 900 females per thousand males.
