= Kolak River =

River in India

Coordinates: 20°27′N 72°52′E

Kolak

Location
- Country: India
- State: Gujarat

Physical characteristics
- Source
  - location: India
- Mouth
  - location: Arabian Sea, India
- Length: 50 km (31 mi)
- Discharge
  - location: Arabian Sea

Kolak River is a river in Gujarat in western India whose origin is Kaprada taluka. Its basin has a maximum length of 50 km. The total catchment area of the basin is 584 km^{2}.

Kolak river flows from Saputara to the Arabian sea near Udwada (holy place of Parsis in Gujarat). There is a textile plant of Welspun and Alok industries on the southern side of the river bank. It flows through the north side of Vapi city in Gujarat.

It is also connected to Madhuban reservoir of Damanganga river and it becomes polluted from Morai village of Vapi where it meets with Bhilkhadi river which has heavy chemical effluents from the chemical industries of Vapi GIDC and textile industries.
