= Nayra River =

Nayra

Location
- Country: India
- State: Gujarat

Physical characteristics
- Source
  - location: India
- Mouth
  - location: Arabian Sea, India
- Length: 32 km (20 mi)
- Discharge
  - location: Arabian Sea

Nayra River is a river in western India in Gujarat whose origin is near Mothada. Its basin has a maximum length of 32 km. The total catchment area of the basin is 279 km^{2}.
