= Kayla River =

Kayla

Location
- Country: India
- State: Gujarat

Physical characteristics
- Source
  - location: India
- Mouth
  - location: Arabian Sea, India
- Length: 25 km (16 mi)
- Discharge
  - location: Arabian Sea

Kayla River is a river in western India in Gujarat whose origin is near Sumarasar village. Its basin has a maximum length of 25 km. The total catchment area of the basin is 168 km2.
