= Shahi River =

Shahi

Location
- Country: India
- State: Gujarat

Physical characteristics
- Source
  - location: India
- Mouth
  - location: Arabian Sea, India
- Length: 38 km (24 mi)
- Discharge
  - location: Arabian Sea

Shahi River is a river in western India in Gujarat whose origin is Near Bhervi village. Its basin has a maximum length of 38 km. The total catchment area of the basin is 163 km2.
