= Keri River =

Keri

Location
- Country: India
- State: Gujarat

Physical characteristics
- Source
  - location: India
- Mouth
  - location: Arabian Sea, India
- Length: 183 km (114 mi)
- Discharge
  - location: Arabian Sea

Keri River is a river in western India in Gujarat whose origin is in the Hindod hills. Its basin has a maximum length of 183 km. The total catchment area of the basin is 560 km2.
