= Kolar River (Narmada) =

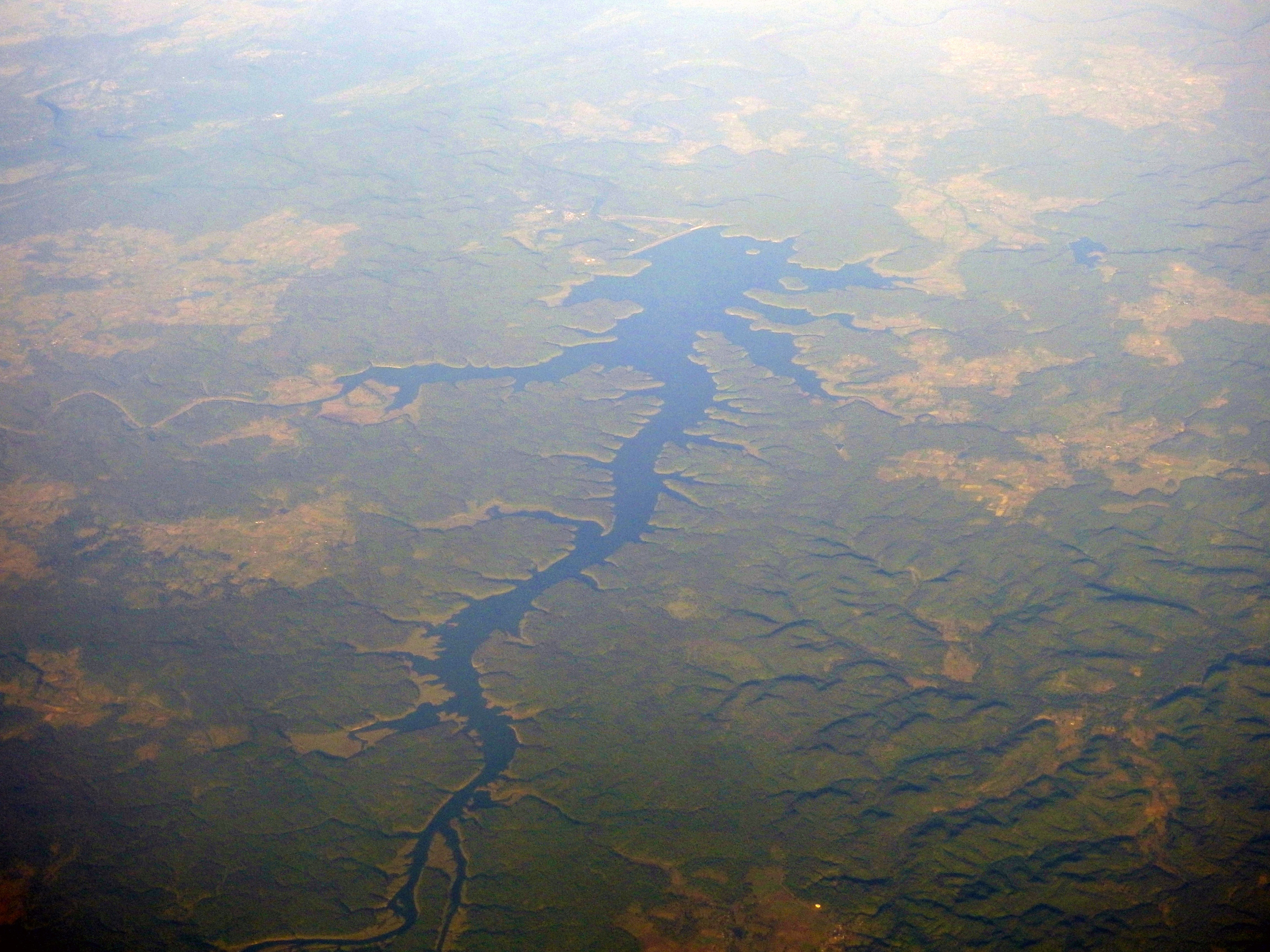
- The Kolar Reservoir, created by the Kolar Dam across the river.

Location
- Country: India
- State: Madhya Pradesh

Physical characteristics
- Mouth: Narmada River
  - coordinates: 21°14′N 79°10′E
- Length: 101 km (63 mi)

The Kolar is a right bank tributary of the Narmada River in India. It flows for a total length of 101 km, all of which is in the state of Madhya Pradesh.

== River Basin ==
The Kolar river arises in the Vindhya Range of Sehore district and flows in a south westerly direction to meet the Narmada at village neelkanth near Nasrullahganj in the Sehore district of Madhya Pradesh. Its total drainage area is of 1,347 km^{2 and} is spread across the two districts. The upper part of the river basin lies at an elevation of 350 to 600 metres and much of it is under tropical deciduous forest. The river debouches into the plains near Jholiapur. Much of the upper basin has poor soils and agriculture here is largely of wheat and gram. The lower basin has better soils and a flatter slope and has been used extensively bunded allowing for impounding water during the monsoons.

== Kolar Dam ==
Near Lawakhadi in Sehore, the Kolar Dam, a masonry dam has been built across the river and it provides about 70% filtered water to Bhopal city and provides for irrigation and inland fisheries.
