= Hiran River =

Hiran
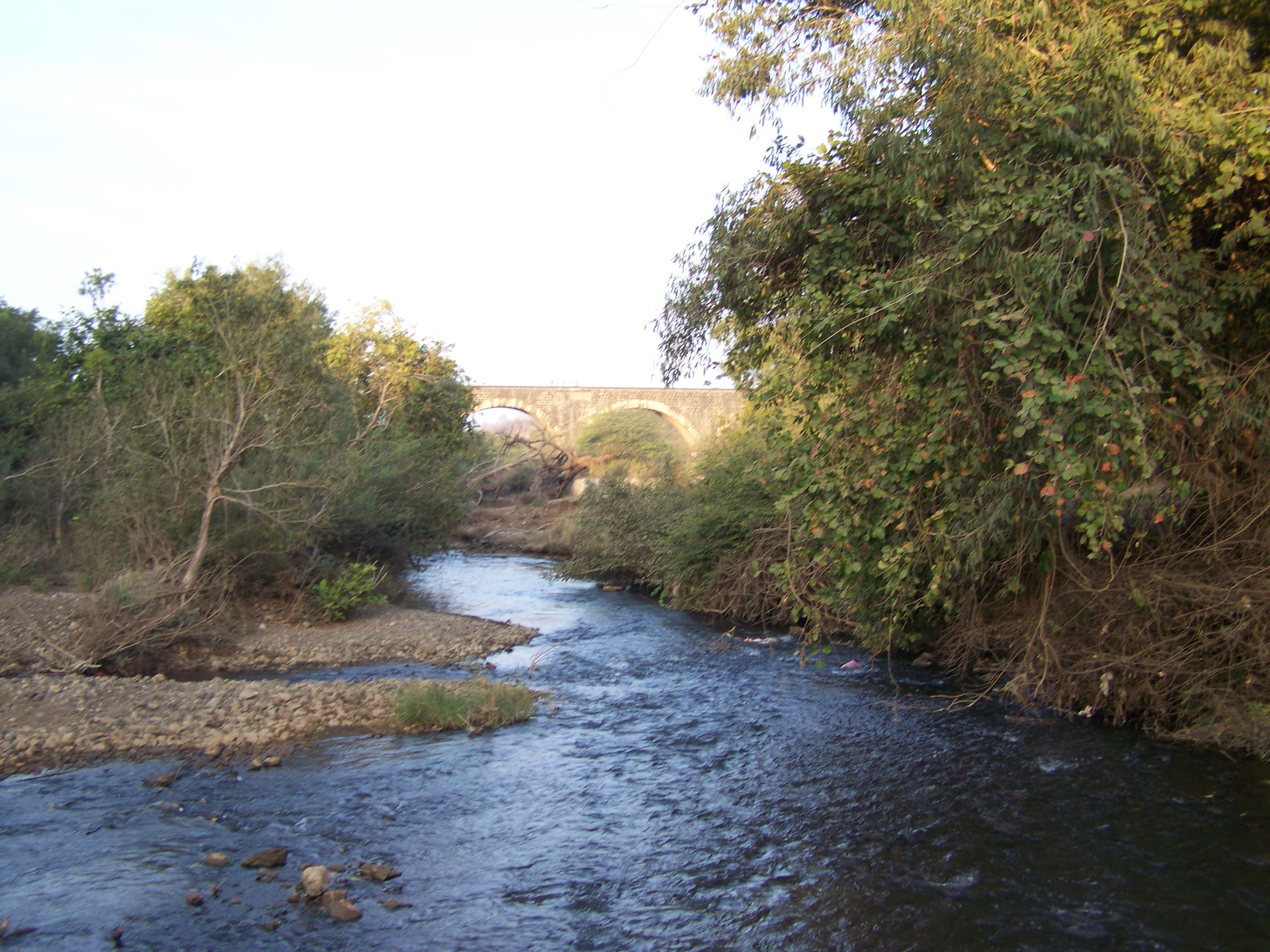
- River Hiran passing through the forest of Sasan Gir

Location
- Country: India
- State: Gujarat

Physical characteristics
- Source
  - location: India
- Mouth
  - location: Arabian Sea, India
  - coordinates: 21°11′54″N 70°39′44″E
- Length: 40 km (25 mi)
- Discharge
  - location: Arabian Sea

Hiran River is a river in Gujarat in western India, whose source is near the Sasa hills in Gir forest. Its drainage basin has a maximum length of 40 km (25 miles). The total catchment area of the basin is 518 km (322 miles). Its major tributaries are the Saraswati River and Ambakhoi stream, and many other unknown branches make this river almost complete near Talala town. Hiran is a major river system which supports a variety of wildlife ecological systems and human settlements. Kamleshwar Dam, often known as Hiran-1 and Umrethi Dam, are some of the major projects on the river. As the river flows from the western part of Gir forest, it is a major source of water for the forest's ecology and biodiversity for the whole year.
