= Rupen River (Taranga) =

Coordinates: 23°28′N 71°28′E

Rupen

Location
- Country: India
- State: Gujarat

Physical characteristics
- Source
  - location: India
- Mouth
  - location: Arabian Sea, India
- Length: 156 km (97 mi)
- Discharge
  - location: Arabian Sea

Rupen River is a river in Gujarat in western India whose origin is the Taranga hills near Kheralu taluka of Mehsana district in Gujarat at an elevation of 180 m above Mean Sea Level and descends in South Western direction. Its drainage basin has a maximum length of 156 km. The total catchment area of the basin is 2,500 square kilometres (970 sq mi).

The Rupen River flows westward through Mehsana district and does not meet the ocean; it dries up in the Rann of Kutch.

It is a Northern basin of Gujarat. It is situated approximately between 230 25’ to 240 00’ North latitude and 71 0 30’ to 720 46’ East longitude.

River	Rupen	Elevation - 180 m	length 156 km	catchment area 2500 km^{2}
Tributaries- Right	Pushpavathi	183 m	68 km	446 km^{2}
Tributaries- Right	Khari	53 m	46 km	170 km^{2}
Tributaries-Left	Khari	131 m	59 km	180 km^{2}

Rupen river has three bank tributaries; two right and one left. The right two tributaries are Pushpavathi and Khari. These drain nearly 24.6% of total catchment area of Rupen river ( 2500 km^{2}). The left tributary is mostly the Khari river. The right side of the river is flows more actively as compared to the left side of the river. So the drainage system is more extensive on the right bank area.

Pushpavathi i.e., the main right tributary of Rupen river arises upstream from hilly area of Balad village of Kheralu taluk, in Mahesana ( Gujarat District) at an elevation of 183 m above Mean Sea Level. So, Pusphavathi meets Rupen river at upstream of Sapawada village.
