= Kareshwar River =

Kareshwar

Location
- Country: India
- State: Gujarat

Physical characteristics
- Source
  - location: India
- Mouth
  - location: Arabian Sea, India
- Length: 16 km (9.9 mi)
- Discharge
  - location: Arabian Sea

Kareshwar River is a river in western India in Gujarat whose origin is Near Kidianagar village. Its basin has a maximum length of 16 km. The total catchment area of the basin is 97 km2.
