= Khalkhalio River =

Khalkhalio

Location
- Country: India
- State: Gujarat

Physical characteristics
- Source
  - location: India
- Mouth
  - location: Arabian Sea, India
- Length: 50 km (31 mi)
- Discharge
  - location: Arabian Sea

Khalkhalio River is a river in western India in Gujarat whose origin is Bhabhat hills. Its basin has a maximum length of 50 km. The total catchment area of the basin is 405 square kilometres (156 sq mi).
