= Kim River =

Coordinates: 21°28′N 72°45′E

Kim Kim Khadi

Location
- Country: India
- State: Gujarat

Physical characteristics
- Source
  - location: India
- Mouth
  - location: Gulf of Cambay, Arabian Sea, India
- Length: 107 km (66 mi)
- Discharge
  - location: Gulf of Cambay, Arabian Sea

Kim river originating from Saputara Hills in Bharuch District is one of the west flowing rivers of Gujarat. It flows for a length of 107 km (66.5 miles) before merging in Gulf of Khambhat. Ghanta and Tokri are the main tributaries of the Kim river.

The total catchment area of the basin is 1,286 square kilometres (128,600 ha). The creek runs near the village of Ilav (which has other spellings for its name, like 'Elaw').

== See also ==
- Forest of the Dangs
- Indian Ocean
- South Gujarat
