= Suvi River =

Suvi

Location
- Country: India
- State: Gujarat

Physical characteristics
- Source
  - location: India
- Mouth
  - location: Arabian Sea, India
- Length: 32 km (20 mi)
- Discharge
  - location: Arabian Sea

Suvi River is a river in western India in Gujarat whose origin is near Badargadh village. Its basin has a maximum length of 32 km. The total catchment area of the basin is 160 km2. The Suvi Irrigation Scheme was sanctioned by Government in February 1959 at an estimated cost of Rs. 20.46. The river is now dammed by the Suvi Dam, a 15 metre high dam completed in 1966.
