= Ozat River =

Ozat

Location
- Country: India
- State: Gujarat

Physical characteristics
- Source
  - location: India
- Mouth
  - location: Arabian Sea, India
- Length: 125 km (78 mi)
- Discharge
  - location: Arabian Sea
  - average: 3 m^{3}/s (110 cu ft/s)

Ozat River is a river in western India, specifically in Gujarat, with its origin near Visavadar. Its basin has a maximum length of 125 km, and the total catchment area of the basin is 3185 km^{2}.
