= Jasdan =

- Municipality
- Location in Gujarat, India Jasdan (India)
- Coordinates: 22.03°N 71.2°E
- Country: India
- State: Gujarat
- District: Rajkot
- Established: 1665; 361 years ago

Government
  - Type: Municipality
  - Body: Jasdan Municipality
- Elevation: 193 m (633 ft)

Population (2011)
  - Total: 101,043

Languages
  - Official: Gujarati
- Time zone: UTC+5:30 (IST)
- PIN: 360050
- Vehicle registration: GJ-03

Jasdan is a city and a municipality in Rajkot district in the Indian state of Gujarat. Jasdan is the biggest sub district in the Rajkot district. Jasdan city has its own Municipality that is known as "Jasdan Municipality" JMP.

== Princely State of Jasdan ==
Jasdan was a princely state in British India in the Saurashtra region. It was founded before 1665 and ruled by the Kathi Kshatriya dynasty.

- 1806 Vajsur Khachar
- 1852 - 1919 Ala Chela Khachar Shri Vajdur Oda
- 11 Jun 1919 – 15 Aug 1947 Darbar Shri Khachar Shri Ala Vajsur (b. 1905)

== Geography ==
Jasdan is located at 22.03°N 71.2°E. It has an average elevation of 293 metres (1633 feet). Jasdan is the biggest Taluka place in Rajkot district and has 103 villages. Geographically it is the heart of the Mandava Hills from where most of the rivers of Saurashtra region originate and then flow to the Arabian Sea and Gulf of Kutchh and Gulf of Khambhat.

The world-famous Hingolgadh sanctuary is located near Jasdan city. Hingolgadh Palace is located in the sanctuary near Jasdan city's "Jasdan-Ahmedabaad highway". Hingolgadh is now a heritage hotel.

Shree Batuk Hanumanji Temple, Shree Gupteshwar Mahadev Temple, Bileshwar Mahadev temple and the sprawling Swaminarayan temple are some of the other religious places in town.

Ancient Ghela Somnath Temple located Easterly in serene environs about 19 km far from Jasdon is very popular.

The Ghela river is also considered sacred by Swaminarayan followers.

== Demographics ==
At the 2001 India census, Jasdan had a population of 80,000. Males constituted 52% of the population and females 48%. Jasdan had an average literacy rate of 67%, higher than the national average of 59.5%: male literacy was 74%, and female literacy 60%. 15% of the population were under 6 years of age.
