= Auranga River (Gujarat) =

Location
- Country: India
- State: Gujarat

Physical characteristics
- Source
  - location: India
- Mouth
  - location: Arabian Sea, India
  - coordinates: 20°38′02″N 72°53′17″E
- Length: 97 km (60 mi)
- Discharge
  - location: Arabian Sea

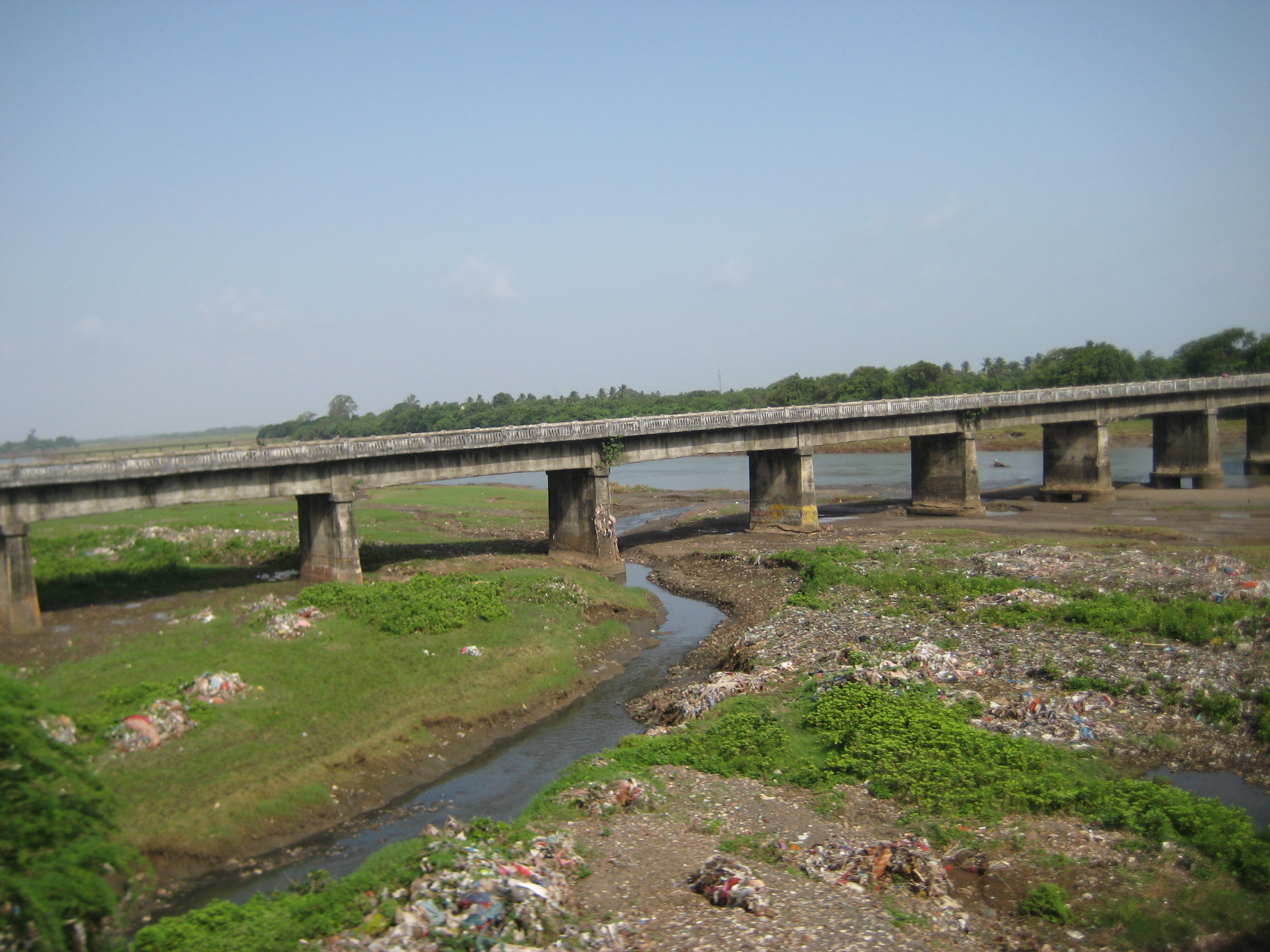

Auranga River is a river in western India in Gujarat whose origin is near Bhervi village. Its basin has a maximum length of 97 km. The total catchment area of the basin is 699 square kilometres (270 sq mi).
