= Mindhola River =

Mindhola
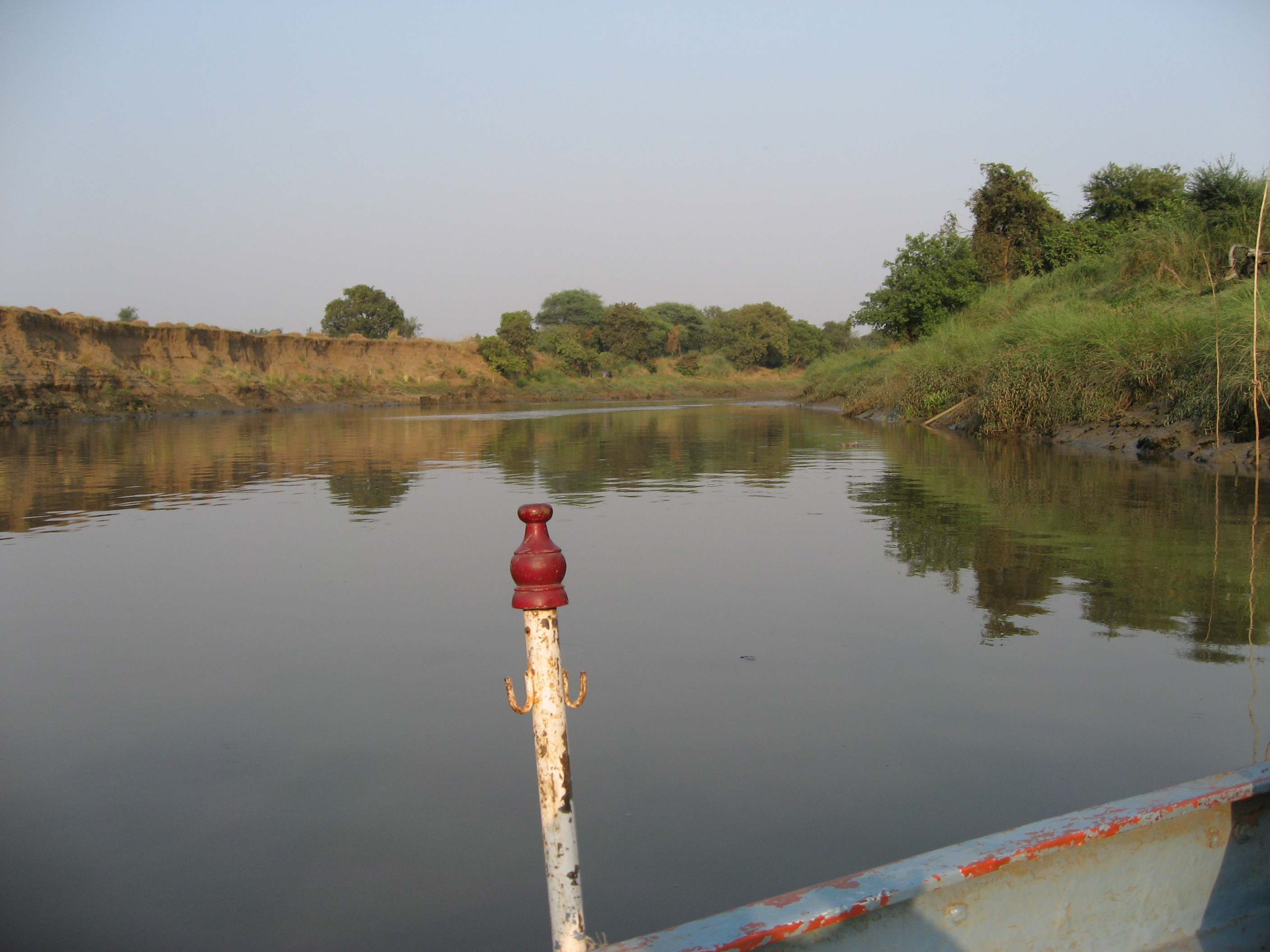

- Location within Gujarat Location within India

Location
- Country: India
- State: Gujarat

Physical characteristics
- Source
  - location: Doswada, Songadh, Gujarat, India
- Mouth
  - location: Danti, Arabian Sea, India
  - coordinates: 21°03′45″N 72°43′40″E
- Length: 105 km (65 mi)
- Discharge
  - location: Gulf of Cambay, Arabian Sea

Mindhola River is a river in western India in Gujarat whose origin is near Doswada, Songadh. Its basin has a maximum length of 105 km (65 mi). The total catchment area of the basin is 1,518 km^{2} (586 sq mi).
