= Chirai River =

Chirai

Location
- Country: India
- State: Gujarat

Physical characteristics
- Source
  - location: India
- Mouth
  - location: Gulf of Kutch, Arabian Sea, India
  - coordinates: 23°09′36″N 70°15′27″E
  - elevation: 0 m.
- Length: 30 km (19 mi)
- Discharge
  - location: Tapar Dam
- Discharge
  - location: Kandla, Gulf of Kutch, Arabian Sea

Chirai River, also known as Sakara River, is a river in Gujarat in western India, whose origin is above the ancient city of Khirsara and meets Bay of Kachchh. Its basin has a maximum length of 30 km. The total catchment area of the basin is 365 km2.

The Tapar Dam (Tappar Dam) on the Chirai was completed in 1975 (23°15′07″N 70°08′11″E). It was an earthen embankment dam with a concrete cover, 4,575 meters long and 17.75 meters high. It was designed to hold 48.81 million cubic meters of water. The dam failed as a result of the January 2001 Bhuj earthquake, and was subsequently rebuilt. The Tapar Reservoir (Tapar Reservoir) provides water for the Gandhidham metropolitan area and the port at Kandla.
