= Malan River (Gir Forest) =

Malan

Location
- Country: India
- State: Gujarat

Physical characteristics
- Source
  - location: India
- Mouth
  - location: Arabian Sea, India
- Length: 55 km (34 mi)
- Discharge
  - location: Arabian Sea

Malan River is a river in western India in Gujarat whose origin is Gir forest. Its basin has a maximum length of 55 km. The total catchment area of the basin is 158 km2.
