= Malan River (Mordhara hills) =

Coordinates: 21°04′N 71°46′E

Malan

Location
- Country: India
- State: Gujarat

Physical characteristics
- Source
  - location: India
- Mouth
  - location: Arabian Sea, India
- Length: 44 km (27 mi)
- Discharge
  - location: Arabian Sea

Malan River is a river in Gujarat, in western India, which originates in the Mordhara hills. Its basin has a maximum length of 44 km. The total catchment area of the basin is 332 km^{2}.

Rajki is the reservoir of river Malan.
