= List of rivers of Rajasthan =

This is a list of rivers of the Indian state Rajasthan

- Most of the rivers of Rajasthan originate from the Aravalli mountain range.

Major Rivers of Rajasthan
Flowing into the Arabian Sea	Flowing into the Bay of Bengal (Tributaries of Ganga And Yamuna)
Mahi	Chambal
Som	Banas
Jakham	Kali Sindh
Sabarmati	Parwati
West Banas	Banganga
Luni	Gambhir
Khari River	Bedach

== Alphabetically ==
Letter	River Names
A	Aalaniya River; Aamjhar River; Aheri River; Ahu River; Andheri River; Anas River; Arvari River
B	Bajaan; Bainthalee River; Baandee River; Bandi River Bandi River, Eastern rajasthan Bhagani River; Banganga River; Banas River; Barani; Baranee; Berach River; Bhadar Nadi; Bilaas; Botadi River
C	Chakan River; Chambal River; Chandrabhaaga River; Chap River; Chhapi River; Choli River; Choti Kali Sindh
D	Dabaari River; Dai River; Dheel; Dhundh River; Dhar River; Dharwol River; Doovaraj River; Dohan River
E	Eeru River; Eej River
G	Gambhiri River; Gambhir River; Gohlan River; Gokali River; Gomati River; Gujari; Guhiya River; Guriya River; Gumti Nalla; Gunjaalee River
H	Hangari Nala; Haran Nadi; Hathmati River
J	Jakham River; Jawai River; Jojari River
K	Kali Sindh; Kaalee khoh River; Kakund River kakni River; Kantali River; Kari Nadi; Krshnaavatee River; Khari; Khari Kherawa; Khari Nadi; Khari River; Kasaavatee River; Kher River; Kothari River; Kotakee River; Kukadi River; Kural River
L	Lhaasee River; Liladi River
M	Magai Nadi; Maajam; Maangali; Mahi River; Mandar Creek; Manasi River; Mena River(India); Mentha River; Meshwo River; Mithari River; Morel River; Moren River
N	Naadi Creek; Naagaani; Nevaj (Niwaj); Nala of Ghanerao; Nala of Muthana; Nala of Phoomphaariya; Nala of Somesar; Nala Of Umarwas
O	Oraei; Oraj
P	Palasan River; Paraban River; Parbati River; Pavbati River; Paravan River; Parawi River; Pachana River; Pipalaaj River
R	Raadiya River; Raayapuraloonee; Rupangad River; Ranoli River; Retadi(Retili)
S	Sabarmati River; Saarani sahibi River; Sagi River; Sarsa River; Sei River; Seep River; Sevaran; Sesaa River; Sili Nadi; Sipu River; Suket River; Sukli River; Sukli River; Sukri River; Suri River; Sukri River; Suri River
T	Tokada
U	Udawariya; Ujaad; Untagan River
V	Vaagan River; Vaangali River; Vatrak River
W	Wakal River; West Banas

== List by drainage basin ==
- Rann of Kutch
  - Luni River
    - Sukri River
      - Nala of Ghanerao
      - Magai Nadi
      - Nala of Muthana
    - Mithari River
    - Bandi River
      - Guhiya River
        - Raipur Luni
        - Guriya River
        - Nala of Phoomphaariya
    - Jawai River
      - Khari River, Rajasthan
        - Nala of Somesar
        - Kherawa
        - Nala Of Umarwas
        - kotakee River
    - Liladi River
    - Sagi River
      - Kari Nadi
    - Jojari River
  - West Banas
    - Sukli River
      - Mandar Creek
      - Botadi River
      - Tokada
      - Udawariya
      - Naagaani
      - Sili Nadi
      - Dabaari
    - Sipu River
    - Naadi Creek
    - Khari River
    - Suket River
    - Sevaran
    - Balram Creek
    - Dharwol
    - Gohlan
    - Hangari Creek
    - Gokali
    - Kukadi
- Gulf of Khambhat
  - Sabarmati River
    - Wakal River
      - Manasi River
      - Parawi River
    - Sei River
    - Hathmati River
    - Meshwo River
    - Vatrak River
    - Maajam
  - Mahi River
    - Eeru River
    - Som River
      - Jakham River
        - Karamaai
        - Sukli River
      - Tidi Creek
      - Gomati River
      - Saarani
    - Anas River
      - Haran Nadi
    - Chap Nadi
    - Moren River
    - Bhadar Nadi
- Yamuna River
  - Chambal River
    - Aalaniya River
    - Banas River
      - Berach River
        - Gambhiri River
        - Gujari
        - Oraei
        - Vaangali
        - Oraj
        - Vaagan River
      - Chandrabhaaga River
      - Eej River
        - Gunjaalee River
      - Mena River(India)
      - Kothari River
      - Khari
      - Mashi River
        - Bandi River
        - Sohadara River
      - Dai River
      - Dheel
        - Gudia River
      - Menali River
        - Baandee River
      - Morel River
        - Dhundh River
        - Khari Nadi
        - Kalisil River
    - Mej River
      - Maangali
        - Ghoda Pachad Nadi
      - Bajaan
      - Kural
    - Choti Kali Sindh
    - Seep River
    - Parbati River
      - Barani
      - Lalsi
      - Baranee
      - Bainthalee River
      - Andheri River
      - Lhaasee River
      - Retadi(Retili)
      - Aheri River
      - Doovaraj
      - Kool River
      - Bilaas
    - Kali Sindh
      - Parban River
        - Nevaj (Niwaj)
        - Dhar River
        - Chhapi
      - Ahu River
        - Pipalaaj River
      - Paravan River
        - Kaalee khoh River
      - Aamjhar
      - Choli
      - Ujaad
    - Chakan River
    - Bamani
  - Gambhir River
    - Kakund River
    - Pachana River
    - Sesaa River
    - Kher River
    - Churaho
    - Parbati River, Karoli
      - Seranee
      - Mendhaka
  - Untagan River
  - Banganga River
    - Gumti Nalla
    - Suri River
    - Palasan River
    - Sanwan River
      - Sarsa River
        - Arvari River
- Shakambari Jheel
  - Rupangad River
  - Mentha River

== List by catchment area ==
- Catchment area of rivers in Rajasthan
  - (According to the book by author H.M. Saxena, Geography of Rajasthan published by Raj Hindi Granth Academy)

Water Catchment Areas in Rajasthan
River System	Catchment Area (in square km)
Banas	46,570
Luni River	34,250
Chambal River	29,110
Banganga River and Gambhiri	16,030
Mentha, Rupangarh Savi Sota, and Savarmati (Vakal)	14,360
West Banas	6,940
Total Catchment Area	1,69,470

- Rajasthan Water catchment area as per ground water year book 2016-17

River Name	Catchment Area (sq km)	Percent
Luni River Sequence	69,302	20.25%
Banas River Sequence	47,060	13.75%
Chambal River Sequence	31,243	9.13%
Mahi River Sequence	16,611	4.85%
Shekhawati Region	9,751	2.85%
Banganga River	8,583	2.51%
Ghaggar River	5,202	1.52%
Gambhir River	137	0.04%
Sabi River	4,524	1.32%
Sabarmati	4,130	1.21%
External Basin	130,522	38.13%
Other Rivers (4)	6,609	1.91%
Total	342,264	100.00%

== See also ==
- Geography of Rajasthan
- Lists of rivers of India
