= Ramjal Setu link project =

Indian state project

Ramjal Setu Link Project (RSLP)
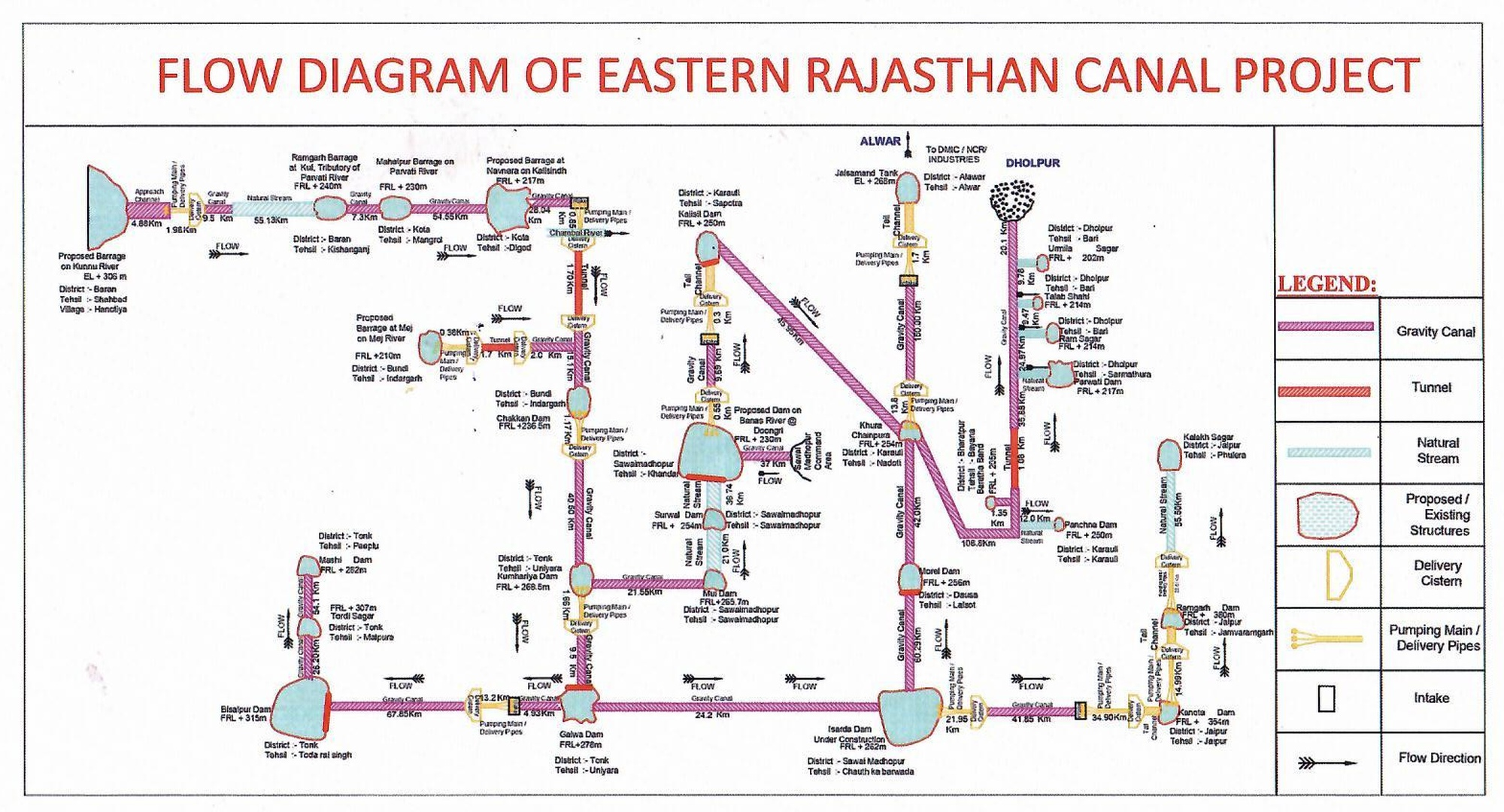
- Location: Eastern districts of Rajasthan, India

Specifications
- Status: Under consideration

Ramjal Setu Link Project or RSLP (previously known as: Parvati-Kalisindh-Chambal-Eastern Rajasthan Canal Project (PKC-ERCP)), a joint river interlinking project initiative of Government of Rajasthan and Government of India to provide water to 17 eastern districts of the Indian state of Rajasthan benefiting 40% of Rajasthan's population, with interbasin transfer of water within the Chambal basin by utilising surplus monsoon water available in sub-basins of Kalisindh, Parbati, Mej and Chakan rivers and diverting it into water deficit sub-basins of Banas, Gambhiri, Banganga and Parbati rivers. Project involves building Navnera Barrage on the Kalisindh River to store and divert water to reservoirs like Bisalpur and Isarda, and the construction of 2,280-meter, three-storey aqueduct across the Chambal River between Kota (Samel village) and Bundi (Guhata village) in Rajasthan. The aqueduct component, costing ₹2,330 crore which will lift water from the already-completed Navnera Barrage on Kali Sindh River and carry it over the Chambal, began construction in May 2025, with a target completion by June 2028. In addition to water transfer, the aqueduct is designed to function as a road.

== History ==
=== 2016-22: Conception ===
In November 2017, Detailed project report (DPR) of Eastern Rajasthan Canal Project (ERCP) was submitted by Government of Rajasthan to the central government, which did not move forward due to its not meeting the criteria for inclusion in the under National Projects scheme.

In December 2022, the Special Committee for Interlinking of Rivers approved the proposal of considering the modified Parbati-Kalisindh-Chambal (PKC) link project integrated with ERCP, as a part of National Perspective Plan, and declared the phase-I of the project as a priority interlinking project. A draft pre-feasibility report of modified PKC link project and a draft MoU for preparing the detailed project report (DPR) of the link project was sent to both the States and Central Water Commission (CWC) in January, 2023. A joint meeting with the States was held in February, 2023 and framework for initiating the work of preparation of DPR of modified PKC link has been finalized during the meeting.

=== 2024: Inauguration ===
ERCP and its 24 projects, with a value of ₹46300 crore, were inaugurated on 17 December 2024 and the Prime Minister of India, Narendra Modi laid a foundation stone in Jaipur.

=== 2025: Renaming of project ===
Chief Minister of Rajasthan Bhajan Lal Sharma announced on 22 January 2025 that Parvati-Kalisindh-Chambal-Eastern Rajasthan Canal Project (PKC-ERCP) Link Project has been renamed Ramjal Setu Link Project (RSLP) to commemorate the first anniversary of the grand consecration of Bhagwan Shri Ram at Ayodhya's Ram Janmabhoomi.

== Benefits ==
Ramjal Setu Link Project envisages irrigation in about 2.82 lakh hectare area (new culturable command area of 2,02,498 hectare and stabilization of irrigation in 80,000 hectare).

== See also ==
- List of canals in India
  - Rajasthan
    - Indira Gandhi Canal (Rajasthan Canal)
    - Ganga Canal (Rajasthan) (Gang Nahar)
  - Indus Water Treaty (IWT), impacts water supply in Rajasthan
- List of rivers in India
  - List of rivers of Rajasthan
  - Rivers and dams of Jammu and Kashmir
  - Rigvedic rivers
- Ministry of Jal Shakti
  - Irrigation in India
  - river interlinking project
  - List of dams and reservoirs in India
  - List of megaprojects in India
