= Sardar Samand =

Lake in Rajasthan, India

Sardar Samand Lake
- Location within Rajasthan Location within India
- Interactive map of Sardar Samand Lake
- Location: Sardar Samand, Pali district, Rajasthan, India
- Coordinates: 25°46′12″N 73°19′48″E
- Type: Artificial lake
- Primary inflows: Sukri River
- Basin countries: India

Sardar Samad is a lake formed by dam built across the Sukri river and Guhiya Nala, which are tributaries of Luni River. It was built with the cost of around 10,20,823 rupees and was named after the Maharaja of Kingdom of Marwar, Sardar Singh. Its construction started in 1899 and completed in 1905–06. It is situated in Pali district sojat of Rajasthan.

== Dam ==
The lake is formed by three earthen dams, with total length of 27,252 feet, maximum of height of 31.5 feet and maximum depth is 25.5 feet. The tank was built to irrigate over 18,000 acres of land, after a good rainfall. Catchment area of Sardar Samand is 800 sq. miles and surface area (when full) is 13 sq. miles. Its capacity is, 3500 million cubic feet and length of canals and distributaries is 30 miles.

This lake was under consideration as a seaplane base for the Imperial Airways Karachi-Calcutta route, but due to less water, Rajsamand was given the preference.

== Village ==
The village developed around the lake is also known as Sardar Samand. It is under Sojat Tehsil of Pali district. Sardar Samand village Pin code is 306401. Total area of the village is 3,204.10 Hectare. As per 2011 Census, total population of the village is, 1269 and number of houses are 277. Female Population is 48.2%.

== Afforestation experiment ==
Sardar Samand was the place of experimentation of artificial afforestation in the barren land, by planting cassia auriculate and Prosopis Juliflora in a closed fenced area and the area soon turned different from the surroundings.

== Irrigation ==
Main purpose of construction of this dam was irrigation. Currently, the lake provides irrigation to over 50,000 farmers when full. From Sardar Samand, there is a 30 km long canal, which stretches up to Bandai, near Rohat.

== Sardar Samand Lake Palace ==
Situated on a hill, the Sardar Samand Lake Palace was commissioned by Maharaja Umaid Singh in 1933. It was designed by the state architect, George Goldstraw. It was built as an Art deco hunting lodge and now turned into a Heritage Hotel. It also houses a vast collection of African trophies.

== Connectivity ==
Under Rajasthan State Highway Developmental Project-2, State Highway 61 connects Jodhpur to Marwar Junction and Jojawar and passes through Sardar Samand, providing better connectivity to the town.

== Bird watching ==
Sardar Samand is also known for sightings of migratory birds like Greater Flamingos, Great White Pelicans, Bar-headed Geese, Kurjan (Demoiselle cranes) and other species of ducks and geese. There are black bucks and other fauna found in its surroundings, which attract bird lovers and wildlife enthusiasts.
