= Bandi River =

River in Pali, Rajasthan, India

Bandi (Hemawas) River
- Interactive Map

Location
- Country: India
- State: Rajasthan
- District: Pali

Physical characteristics
- Source: Confluence of Khari and Mithari Rivers
  - location: Near Bombadra pickup weir
- Mouth: Confluence with Luni River
  - location: Near Lakhar village, Pali District
- Length: 45 km (28 mi)
- Basin size: Bandi 1,685 km^{2} (651 sq mi); Guhiya 3,835 km^{2} (1,481 sq mi)

The Bandi River, also known as the Hemawas River, is a significant river in the Pali District of Rajasthan, India. It is formed by the confluence of the Khari and Mithari Rivers near the Bombadra pickup weir. The river flows for approximately 45 km before merging with the Luni River near the village of Lakhar.

== Course ==
The Bandi River basin is located between latitudes 25°15′ and 25°55′ and longitudes 72°56' and 73°57'. Covering an area of 1,685 km², the river's catchment area primarily falls within the Pali District.

== Course and Tributaries ==
A significant tributary of the Bandi River is the Guhiya River. Originating in the hillocks near the villages of Kariyaniv and Tarasanib within the Pali District, the Guhiya River joins the Bandi River near the village of Phekariya. The Guhiya River basin spans between latitudes 24°45' and 26°14' and longitudes 72°58' and 74°14'. Encompassing a catchment area of 3,835 km², this basin is also situated within the Pali District. Notable tributaries of the Guhiya River include Raipur Luni, Radia Nadi, Guria Nadi, Lilri Nadi, Sukri, and Phunpharia Bala.

== See also ==
- Luni River
- Pali District
