= Bhagwatgarh =

Coordinates: 26°12′N 82°06′E

- Village
- Interactive map of Bhagwatgarh
- Country: India
- State: Rajasthan

Languages
  - Official: Hindi
- Time zone: UTC+5:30 (IST)
- PIN: 322701

Bhagwatgarh is a village in the southwest of Sawai Madhopur District in Rajasthan state of India. It is surrounded by a continuous series of mountains from the south-west and river Banas from the north-west.

Its population is 11000, according to Census 2007. 85% of them are dependent on agriculture.

== Notable sites ==
Notable sites include Sapt-Kund, Temple of Bhagwan KeshavRai, Areneshwer Mahadev Temple, and Kheda Pati Balaji temple. In Sapt Kund there are seven kunds, each with a specific purpose.
