= Shamlaji fair =

Shamlaji fair is an annual festival held in Gujarat, India. It is held on the day of Karthiki Purnima. The fair is attended by a large number of tribals, who have great faith in Shamlaji (Baliya Bawji). People from different regions of Gujarat as well as the state of Rajasthan also come to this fair.

The fair is held at the ancient shrine Shamlaji on the banks of Meshwo river in Aravalli district from Devuthi Agiyaras to Purnima, which is the longest running fair in Gujarat.

== Construction ==
The history of when and who built the temple of Shamlaji is not available, but based on the remains found in the area around Shamlaji, according to the Archaeological Department, the temple is estimated to have been built in the period of 500 A.D to 700 A.D.

There are three legends behind the construction of shrine Shamlaji:

(1) According to one legend, once Brahma came to Shamlaji in search of the best pilgrimage on earth and stopped there, he started penance and Yajna (sacrifice). As a result Vishnu appeared in the form of Shamlaji and established himself there.

(2) According to another legend, Vishwakarma, the architect of the gods, built this temple in one night, and

(3) According to the third legend, an idol of Shamlaji was found here by a tribal farmer while farming. A temple was built there by Vaishnava devotees.
