= Morel dam =

- Interactive map of Morel dam
- Country: India
- Coordinates: 26°26′36″N 76°20′15″E
- Purpose: To provide water for farming by Morel canal

Morel dam is a earthen dam on the Morel River near Peelukhera Khurd in Sawai Madhopur district, Rajasthan, India.

== Geography ==
- Dist.- Dausa and Sawai Madhopur
- State- Rajasthan
- River name- Morel
- Name of Tributary- Morel
- Length- 805(m)
- Basin- Morel
- Nearest City- Lalsot Exact location- Peelukhera Kalan
- Type of Dam- Earthen Dam
- Year of Completion- 1959
- Purpose of Dam- Irrigation of agricultural land

The Morel Dam is constructed on the Morel River, about 16 km from Lalsot, and irrigates 8.6 thousand hectares.

== History ==
The 1951 Census of India recorded the Morel as forming the famous Morel Bund, which was used for irrigation in Lalsot tehsil. The National Register of Large Dams records 1952 as the year of completion of Morel Dam. A Government of India report for 1955–56 listed the Morel among the important irrigation works already completed under the Five-Year Plan.

=== 1981 flood and dam breach ===
In July 1981, exceptionally heavy rainfall caused severe flooding in eastern Rajasthan. The Morel Dam was breached, and the Morel River changed its course. The event resulted in flooding in several villages, including Hingonia, and flooding in the Banganga, Bhadrawati and Borkheda rivers.

A later study reported that, following the July 1981 breach, the Morel River abandoned its previous course and shifted approximately 1–2 km eastward towards Berkhandi in Bamanwas tehsil.

=== Geophysical investigation (1998–2001) ===
In 1998, the Geological Survey of India conducted a geophysical investigation at the waste-weir site of Morel Dam to determine bedrock topography and structural features. The investigation was followed by a 2001 study using vertical electrical sounding and refraction-seismic methods, which proposed a new spillway about 250 m east of the existing one.

=== Rehabilitation and remedial works (2006–09) ===
Under the Rajasthan Water Sector Restructuring Project, dam-safety remedial works were undertaken at Morel Dam. The works were divided into two packages, designated Morel Dam-1 and Morel Dam-2. By March 2007, the Morel Dam-1 package had been allotted, while the Morel Dam-2 package had not yet been allotted.

Separately, a contract for the rehabilitation of the earthen dam of the Morel Irrigation Project, Dausa, was issued under Work Order No. 53/2006–07. The Rajasthan High Court recorded that the work was completed during the extended contractual period, with the extended completion date of 1 February 2009.

== Ecology ==
=== Wetland and bird diversity ===
A study conducted from March 2015 to February 2017 recorded 55 species of waders belonging to 15 families and six orders in the Morel Dam wetland. Of these, 52.72% were widespread migratory species and 47.27% were widespread resident species. The study identified the wetland as important for the conservation of waders and waterbirds and noted increasing anthropogenic activities as a major threat to the wetland ecosystem.
