= Sankhwali =

Shankhwali
- Village
- Location in Rajasthan, India Shankhwali (India)
- Coordinates: 25.4833°N 72.8833°E
- Country: India
- State: Rajasthan
- District: Jalor
- Elevation: 178 m (584 ft)

Population (2001)
  - Total: 3,059

Languages
  - Official: Hindi
- Time zone: UTC+5:30 (IST)
- PIN: 307029
- Telephone code: +912978
- ISO 3166 code: RJ-IN
- Vehicle registration: RJ-16
- Sex ratio: 1169 ♂/♀

Sankhwali is a village in the Ahore tehsil of Jalore district of Indian state Rajasthan.

Mithari river, the tributary river of Luni vanishes near this village after entering the Jalore district from Pali district.

== History ==
It is an ancient village, inhabited about more than 5,000 years ago. Arjun after eloping with Lord Krishna's sister Subhadra from Dwarika got married here in a nearby village Bhadrajun with the help of a priest (a local Brahmin). In exchange for his services, Arjuna gave his conch shell (Shankh) to the Brahmin and Subhadra gave him her earring (bali). Hence Brahman's this village was thereafter known as Shankhwali. A small temple was erected there and Devi Subhadra is being worshipped as "Dhumda Mata". &

== Demographics ==
Population of Sankhwali is 3,059 according to census 2001. where male population is 1,410 while female population is 1,649.
