= Magai Nadi =

River in Desuri, Rajasthan, India

Magai
- Interactive Map
- Interactive map of Magai
- Location: Rajasthan, Western India, India, South Asia, Asia
- Coordinates: 25.3369°N 73.3374°E
- Type: River
- Part of: Luni River Basin
- Basin countries: India

Magai is a river located in Desuri tehsil of pali in Rajasthan, Western India. It is situated at latitude 25.3369° or 25° 20' 13" north and longitude 73.3374° or 73° 20' 15" east. The river is categorized as a body of water and is represented as a natural. This river is a tributary of Sukri river.

== See also ==
- List of rivers of India
- Rajasthan
