= Raipur Luni =

River in Rajasthan, India

Coordinates: 26°10′N 73°44′E

- Raipur Luni

Location
- State: Rajasthan

Physical characteristics
- Source: Merwara hills, Rajasthan
- Mouth: Luni River, Pali district
- Length: 48 kilometres (30 mi)
- Basin size: 2,200 square kilometres (850 sq mi)
- Depth
  - average: 1 metre (3.3 ft)
  - maximum: 5 metres (16 ft)
- Discharge
  - average: 13 m3/s (350 cu ft/s)

Basin features
- Tributaries
  - left: Guhiya River

The Raipur Luni river is a tributary of the Luni River. It originates in the Merwara hills of Rajasthan, India.

The river flows for 48 kilometres (30 mi) before joining the Luni River in the Pali district of Rajasthan. Its drainage basin covers an area of 2,200 square kilometres (850 sq mi); the depth of the river is 5 metres (16 ft). The water quality of the Raipur Luni River is eutrophic, meaning that it is nutrient-rich.
