= Bandh Baretha =

Protected area in Rajasthan, India

Bandh Baretha Wildlife Sanctuary
- IUCN category IV (habitat/species management area)
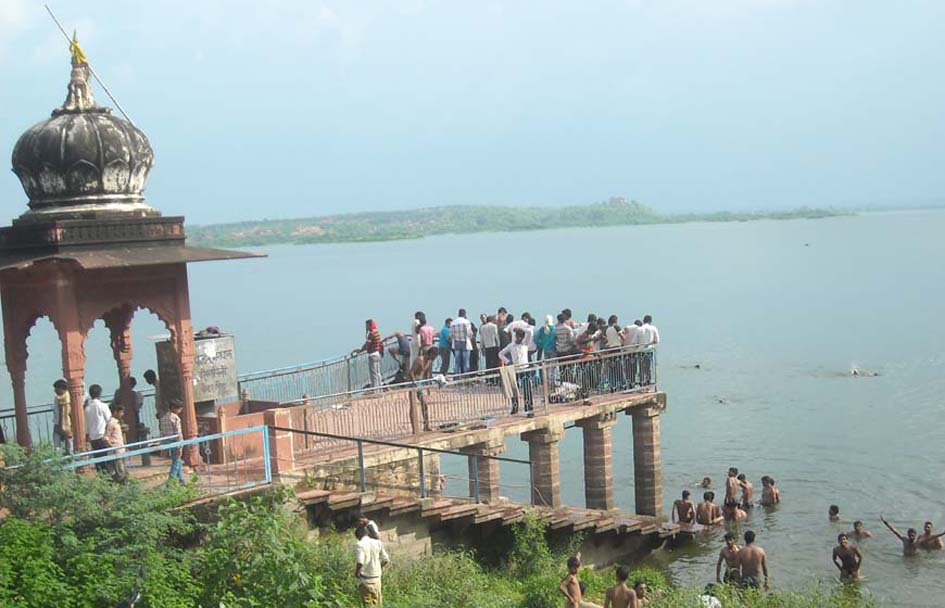
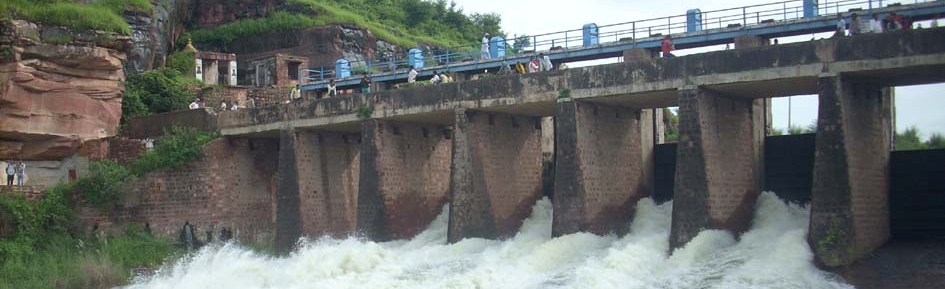
- Top: Bandh Baretha Reservoir; Bottom: Bandh Baretha, Dam

- Location within Rajasthan
- Interactive map of Bandh Baretha Wildlife Sanctuary
- Location: Approximately 50 kilometers south of Bharatpur city, Bayana tehsil, Bharatpur, India
- Coordinates: 26°53′00″N 77°21′40″E
- Area: 368.5048 km^{2} (142.2805 sq mi)
- Established: 1985
- Governing body: Rajasthan State Forest Department

Bandh Baretha is a freshwater man-made wetland and wildlife sanctuary covering an area of 10 square kilometers. It is located approximately 50 kilometers south of Bharatpur city, in the Bayana tehsil of Bharatpur, India. This sanctuary serves as a significant winter resort for migratory birds and plays a crucial role in storing drinking water for the region.

== History ==
It is a historic wildlife reserve that was formerly maintained by the rulers of Bharatpur. In 1866, Jaswant Singh of Bharatpur initiated the construction of a dam on the Kakund River, which was completed under the rule of Ram Singh in 1897. An area of approximately 192.76 square kilometers surrounding the dam was designated as a wildlife sanctuary in 1985 by the Government. In 2021 additional 197.855 square kilometers area was added from Karauli district into the wildlife sanctuary making the total area of the sanctuary to 368.5048 square kilometers.

== Geography ==
The sanctuary is situated near the small river Kakund, which enters the south-western border of Bayana tehsil from Karauli district. Here, the river's waters are held in the Baretha reservoir. During low rainfall years, the population of water birds increases, making it a large, permanent, and legally protected wetland. Gambhir and Ruparel rivers flow through the sanctuary.

== Fauna ==
Bundh Baretha wildlife sanctuary is home to Striped hyena, Bengal fox, Chinkara, Chital, Sambar deer, Wild boar and Nilgai. The sanctuary's varied habitats support the conservation of critically endangered species such as the Indian Pangolin, as well as vulnerable species like the Sloth Bear. It has a diverse avian population of over 200 species, with a total of 67 water bird species, including six globally threatened species. Bird species include Black Bittern, Avocets, Bee-eaters, Herons, and Kingfishers. It is an essential refuge for birds, especially when adverse conditions prevail in the nearby Keoladeo National Park wetlands. The aquatic vegetation in this sanctuary is similar to that found in Keoladeo National Park, further highlighting its ecological significance.
