= Sei River =

River in Rajasthan, India

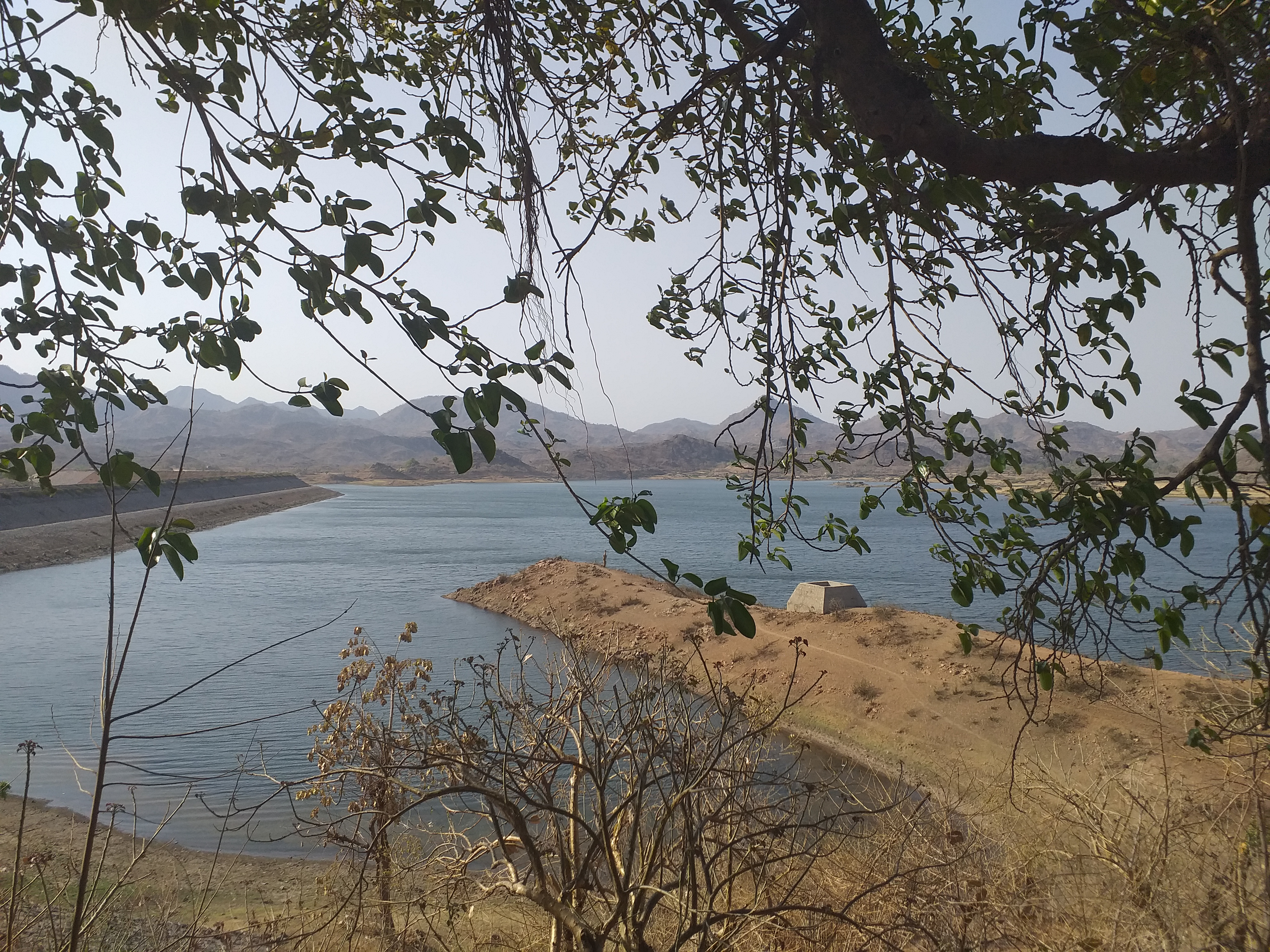
- Reservoir of Sei Dam in Kotra tehsil, Udaipur district, Rajasthan

Location
- Countries: India

Physical characteristics
- Source: Aravalli Range
- Mouth: Sabarmati River

The Sei River is a tributary of the Sabarmati River in India. It is accompanied by the Wakal River, another tributary of the Sabarmati River. Both rivers originate in the Aravali Range, west of Udaipur, in Rajashthan. They flow in a south-westwerly direction, roughly parallel to the course of the Sabarmati River. Eventually, they meet and merge with the Sabarmati River in the state of Gujarat.

== See also ==
- Sabarmati River
- Aravali hill range
