= Kakni River =

Kakni River Masurdi

Physical characteristics
- Source: Kotari, Jaisalmer

Basin features
- Cities: Lodhruva

The Kakni river, also known as the Masurdi river or the Kakneya river, is a small seasonal river located in Jaisalmer district of Rajasthan, India. It originates approximately 27 km (17 mi) in the hills south of the village of Kotari and flows for a few kilometres before draining into the Bhuj lake. It is the smallest river among the inland rivers of Rajasthan.

== Bhuj lake ==
Bhuj lake, situated in Jaisalmer, is primarily formed by the waters of the Kakni river.

== Geography ==
The hilly mound on which Kuldhara is situated lies to the north of Masurdi Nadi and to the west of the dry bed of the old Kakni river, which has now turned into a nullah.

== See also ==
- List of rivers of Rajasthan
