= Chandrabhaaga River =

River in Rajasthan, India

Chandrabhaga River

Location
- Country: India
- State: Rajasthan

Physical characteristics
- Source
  - location: Hills of Amet area, Rajsamand district
- Mouth
  - location: Bhilwara district

The Chandrabhaga River is a river in India that originates from the hills of Amet area in Rajsamand district and flows to join the Banas River in Bhilwara district.
