= Andheri River =

River in Madhya Pradesh and Rajasthan, India

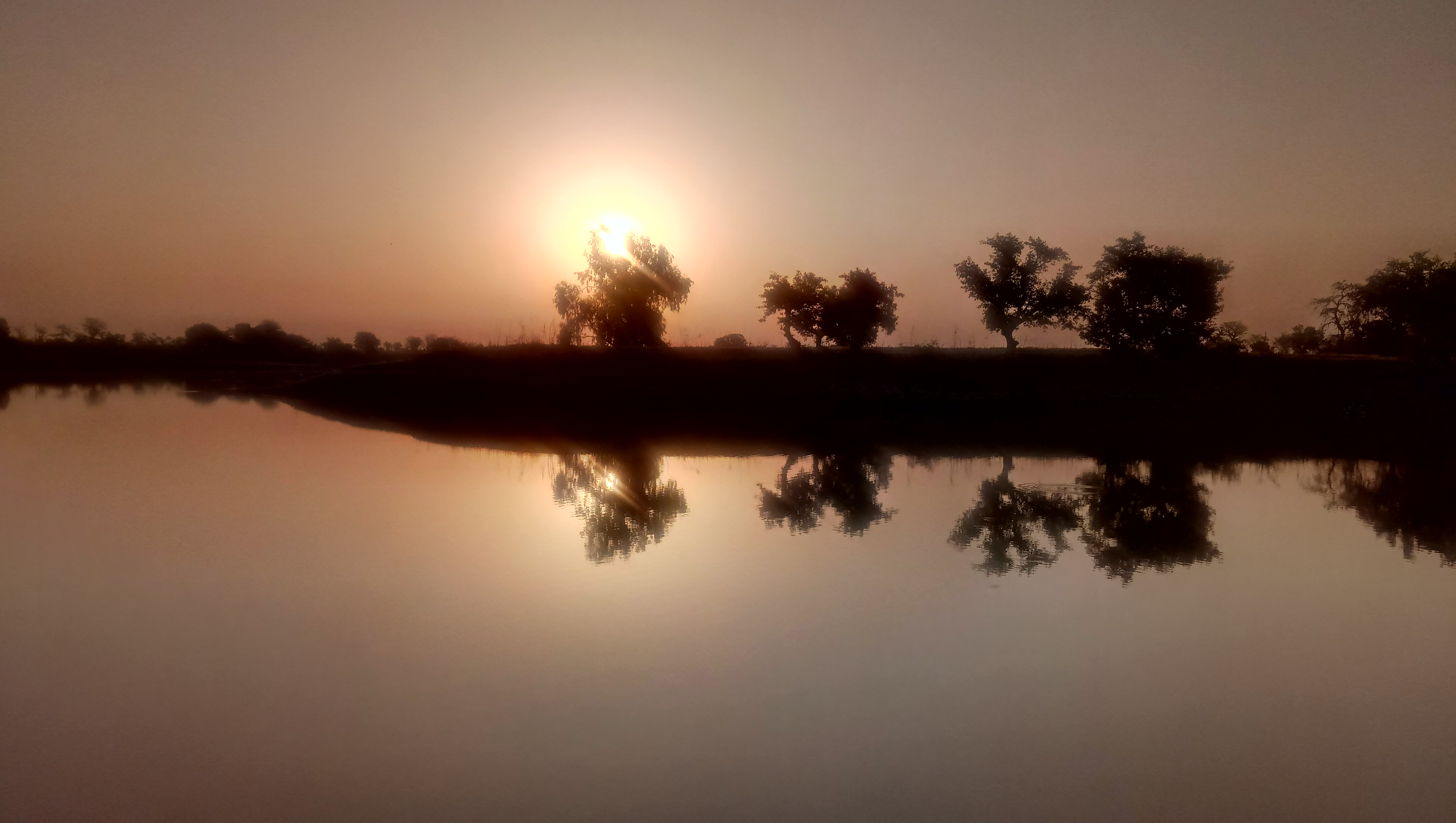
- Andheri River near Kherliganj, Baran District

Location
- Country: India
- State: Madhya Pradesh; Rajasthan

Physical characteristics
- Source: Madhya Pradesh
- Mouth: Parvati River
  - location: Near Atru, Rajasthan
  - coordinates: 24°54′12″N 76°40′59″E

Basin features
- Tributaries
  - left: Retili River

The Andheri River is a river that originates in Madhya Pradesh and flows through the Baran district of Rajasthan, eventually joining the Parvati River near Atru.

== Geography ==
The Andheri River begins its journey in Madhya Pradesh and meanders through the Bara district of Rajasthan before merging with the Parvati River near Atru.

== See also ==
- Parvati River
