= Kakund River =

- Interactive Map

Location
- Country: India
- State: Rajasthan

Physical characteristics
- Source: Hills of Karauli district
- Mouth: Gambhir River
  - coordinates: 26°59′19″N 77°23′54″E

Basin features
- Bridges: Bandh Baretha

The Kakund River is a small river in Bharatpur district and Karauli District, Rajasthan, India. It flows from the hills of Karauli district and enters the south-western border of Bayana Tehsil from the Karauli side. Its waters are held up in the Baretha reservoir, which is the largest storage of water in the region.

== History ==
The construction of Baretha Bund, which spans the Kakund River, was commenced in 1866 and completed in 1897. This bund plays a crucial role in water management and irrigation.

== Geography ==
The Kakund River flows through Bayana Tehsil and has a northern boundary that touches the river. It eventually debouches into the Gambhir River, exhibiting an easterly flow.

== Baretha Dam ==
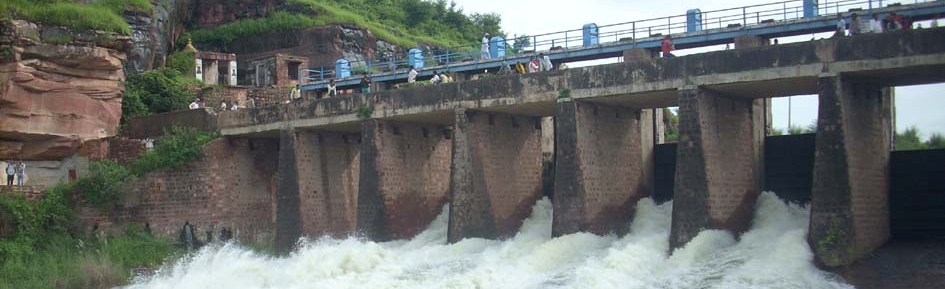
The Bandh Baretha is situated near the village Baretha on the Kakund River. This River, originating from the hills of Karauli district, serves the purpose of drinking water supply and irrigation for the district. It has a capacity of 684.00 million cubic feet (29 Gaze feet).

== Kishan Sagar Lake ==
A few kilometers east of Bayana, in the Baretha hills, there is the man-made lake, Kishan Sagar, formed by damming the Kakund River. During the winter months, the lake becomes a habitat for numerous species of migrating birds, as well as resident species that breed here during the post-monsoon months.

== Water Supply to Bharatpur ==
A dam, Bandha Baratha, has been built in Baratha village (Bharatpur) by stopping the waters of the Kakund River. This dam is a crucial source of drinking water supply to the city of Bharatpur.

== See also ==
- List of rivers of Rajasthan
