= Banganga River (Rajasthan) =

Basin features
- Progression: Yamuna River
- Waterbodies: Ramgarh Lake

Banganga River, an 240 km long tributary of Gambhir river in India, originates from the hills of Aransar and Bairath (Virat Nagar) in Jaipur region of Rajasthan state and converges with Yamuna near Fatehabad in Agra district of Uttar Pradesh state. Its main tributaries are Gumti Nalla and Suri River on right bank, and Sanwan and Palasan Rivers on left bank. Banganga's tributary Sanwan after converging with Tildah river then converges with Banganga river which in turn then converges with the Gambhir river which in turn converges with the Yamuna in Mainpuri district of Uttar Pradesh. Finally, Yamuna converges with Ganges at Triveni Sangam in Prayagraj.

The river basin has 596 mm rainfall and 95% of which falls during the four monsoon months from June to September.

== Basin ==
Within Rajasthan, its drainage basin fully or partially covers 30 Community Development Blocks (CDB) with 2,473 towns and villages in Alwar, Jaipur, Dausa, Sawai Madhopur and Bharatpur districts of Rajasthan. The river Banganga has its several tributary rivers such as Gumti Nala, and Suri rivers on the right side banks and Palasan and Sanwan rivers are on the left bank. Jamwa Ramgarh dam has been constructed across the river in Jaipur.

Its main tributaries are as follows:

- Right bank tributaries
  - Gumti Nalla, 24 km long with 102 km2 catchment area between latitudes 25°00'30" and 25°53' and longitudes 75°52' and 76°01', originates near Bhaimpura village in Jaipur district and converges with Banganga near the Talo village.
  - Suri River: 28 km long with 76 km2 catchment area between latitudes 26°44' and 26°53' and longitudes 76°25' and 76°30', originates in hills of Kanst village of Dausa district, flows north 18 km and then northeast for another 10 km where it converges with Banganga Kailai.
- Left bank tributaries
  - Sanwan River: 95 km long with 660 km2 catchment area between latitudes 26°59' and 27°22' and longitudes 76°16' and 76° 46', originates near hills of Angri village of Alwar district, flows 29 km southwards to Sirsa Devi Bund, then 66 km eastwards where it converges with Banganga at Juthiara.
  - Palasan River: 48 km long with 539 km2 catchment area between latitudes 27°02' and 27°18' and longitudes 76°25' and 76°49', originates in hills of Rajpura village of Alwar District, flows south-east for 24 km and another 24 km in east and then converges with Banganga near Tudiyana village.

== Issues and conservation Basin ==
Water levels have now dropped to a very low level with nearby areas suffering from water shortages. Fairly recently, within 30 years, these areas were vibrant and arable with different types of agriculture . There were significant areas of forest along the Banganga's route and earlier it was known for the cultivation of dates in Maid (a town based on the river bank) but with the dropping water levels the date farming has suffered.

== See also ==
- Sahibi River
- List of rivers of Rajasthan
- List of rivers of India
- Baanganga
