= Sagi River =

River in Rajasthan, India

- Interactive Map

Physical characteristics
- Source
  - location: Jaswanthapura hills, Jalore District, Rajasthan, India
- Mouth
  - location: Near Gandhav village, Barmer District, Rajasthan, India
- Length: Approximately 72 kilometers

Basin features
- Tributaries
  - left: Kari Nadi

The Sagi River is a significant watercourse in the Indian state of Rajasthan. It originates from the southwestern slopes of the Jaswanthapura hills in Jalore District The river flows for approximately 72 kilometers in a northwest direction before eventually turning southwest, where it meets the Luni River near Gandhav village in Barmer District.

== Geography ==
The Sagi River begins its journey in the picturesque Jaswanthapura hills, situated in Jalore District. From its source, the river winds its way northwest, covering a distance of about 72 kilometers, eventually changing course to flow southwestward.

== Tributary ==
One of the notable tributaries of the Sagi River is the Kari Nadi, which contributes to the overall flow of the river.

== See also ==
- Luni River
- Barmer District
