= Birami =

Birami Birhami
- village
- Location in Rajasthan, India Birami (India)
- Coordinates: 26°09′20″N 73°13′32″E
- Country: India
- State: Rajasthan
- District: Jodhpur
- Taluka: Luni

Population (2001)
  - Total: 1,790
- Time zone: UTC+5:30 (IST)
- ISO 3166 code: RJ-IN
- Vehicle registration: RJ-
- Climate: Dry (Köppen: BSh)
- Lok Sabha constituency: Pali
- Vidhan Sabha constituency: Bilara SC

Birami is a panchayat village in Rajasthan, India, on the right (north) bank of the Luni River. Administratively, it is under Luni Taluka, Jodhpur district, Rajasthan.

There are four villages in the Birami gram Panchayat: Birami, Birdawas, Miyasani, and Peethasani.

== Geography ==
The village of Birami is 32 km by road southeast of the city of Jodhpur, located between the Mitri River to the north, and the Luni River to the south, just 4 km upstream (east) of the confluence of the two rivers. As the village is at the eastern edge of the Thar Desert, the rivers only run in monsoon season. The nearest railway station is at Tanawara, 30 km by road to the west.

== Demographics ==
In the 2001 census, the village of Birami had 1,790 inhabitants, with 944 males (52.7%) and 846 females (47.3%), for a gender ratio of 896 females per thousand males.

== Points of interest ==
The temple of Bhuwal mata is located in Birami village.
