= Rupangarh River =

Physical characteristics
- Source
  - location: Reserve Forest of Nag Pahad, between Pushkar and Ajmer
- Mouth
  - location: Sambhar Lake

The Rupangarh River is a river in Rajasthan, India. It originates from the Reserve Forest of Nag Pahad situated between Pushkar and Ajmer. The river flows through Salemabad and Jaipur before finally reaching the Sambhar Lake. Salemabad, the main seat of Nimbarka sect, is situated on the banks of this river.

== Course ==
The Rupangarh River begins its journey in the scenic Reserve Forest of Nag Pahad, nestled between the towns of Pushkar and Ajmer. From its source, the river flows through the region of Salemabad and makes its way towards the city of Jaipur. Along its course, the river serves as a lifeline for various communities and ecosystems.

== Confluence ==
The Rupangarh River completes its journey by merging into the vast expanse of the Sambhar Lake. This terminal point marks a significant juncture in the river's course, as its waters contribute to the ecology of the Sambhar Lake area.

== Importance ==
The Rupangarh River has both ecological and cultural importance. It supports a diverse range of flora and fauna along its banks and provides essential resources for local communities. Additionally, the river holds a place of reverence in the local culture and history, influencing traditions and ways of life.
