= Dhund River =

Location
- Country: India
- State: Rajasthan
- District: Jaipur, Dausa, Sawai Madhopur

Physical characteristics
- Source
  - location: Achrol, Jaipur district, Rajasthan
  - elevation: approx. 600 m
- Mouth
  - location: Confluence with Morel River near Mandaliya, Rajasthan
  - coordinates: 26°31′09″N 76°09′16″E
- Length: 98.95 km (61.5 mi)
- Basin size: 1,828 km² (706 sq mi)

Basin features
- Tributaries
  - right: Amanishah Nala (Dravyavati River), Jhalana River, Ratanganga Nala

The Dhund River is a seasonal river in eastern Rajasthan, India. Originating near Achrol in Jaipur district, it flows southward for approximately 99 km (62 mi) before joining the Morel River in Sawai Madhopur district. Its drainage basin covers approximately 1,828 square kilometres (706 sq mi).

According to local reports (including Dainik Bhaskar), the river originates near Bhairu Khejra on Sikar Road, while scientific studies place the origin near Achrol.

== Hydrology and groundwater ==
In March 1999, a groundwater assessment and management project covering part of the Dhund River basin in Jaipur district was approved under the National Resources Data Management System programme. The project was assigned to the Department of Geology at the University of Rajasthan, Jaipur, with an approved cost of ₹1,024,460.
