= Chandsar =

- Village
- Location in Gujarat, India
- Coordinates: 23.17°N 72.82°E
- Country: India
- State: Gujarat
- District: Arvalli
- Elevation: 73 m (240 ft)

Population (08-09-2016)
  - Total: 300

Languages
  - Official: Gujarati, Hindi
- Time zone: UTC+5:30 (IST)
- PIN: 383335
- Website: Village of Chandsar On web

Chandsar is a small village in the district of Aravalli district in the state of Gujarat, India.

== Geography ==
Chandsar is located at 23.17°N 31.76°E. It has an average elevation of 73 metres (239 feet).

Chandsar is separated from other villages by the main river on one side and by its tributary on two other sides, and is subject to floods. There are a few hundred residents, primarily farmers, and about fifty families. The temple of Mahakali Mata in the middle of the village, near a pond. The village has a fair weather connection with the main road. There is no bridge over the river.

There is a school that goes up to the 4 standard stage. A neighboring village has a medical dispensary and the local post office.

== Demographics ==
As of 2014 India census, Chandsar had a population of 300. Males constitute 50.22% of the population and females 49.78%. Chandsar has an average literacy rate of 65%, higher than the national average of 59.5%: male literacy is 73% and, female literacy is 58%. In Chandsar, 14% of the population is under 6 years of age.

It is situated in the district of Arvalli Gujarat, 20 km from Bayad, 15 km from Malpur, 24 km from Modasa and 14 km from Virpur. The village receives abundant water for irrigation from a canal of the Vatrak River.
