= Rashtriya Raksha University =

National Police and CAPF University in Gujarat, India

- Emblem of Rashtriya Raksha University
- Other name: RRU
- Former name: Raksha Shakti University
- Motto: Rashtriya Suraksha Sarvopari
- Motto in English: National Security is Supreme
- Type: INI; Public; Research university
- Established: 2009; 17 years ago (as Raksha Shakti University); 2020; 6 years ago (as Rashtriya Raksha University)
- Parent institution: Ministry of Home Affairs, Govt. of India
- Accreditation: Ministry of Home Affairs, Govt. of India
- Affiliations: BRICS Universities League; CFSL
- Vice-Chancellor: Dr. Bimal N. Patel
- Location: RRU Campus, Lavad-Dahegam, Gandhinagar district, Gujarat, 382305, India; 23°09′16″N 72°53′06″E
- Campus: Urban
- Website: rru.ac.in

Rashtriya Raksha University (simply RRU; lit. Hindi राष्ट्रीय रक्षा विश्वविद्यालय, formerly Raksha Shakti University) is a public central university and an autonomous institute located in Gandhinagar, Gujarat, India. Ajit Doval is one of the board members of this university. It is recognized as an Institution of National Importance under the Ministry of Home Affairs (MHA), Government of India, by an act of the Indian Parliament. RRU specializes in national security, cyber security, digital forensics, and internal security. It has its jurisdiction over state of Gujrat.

It was established by the Government of Gujarat, India, in 2009. In 2020, via Act 31 of Parliament of India, the Government of India took over the university from the Government of Gujarat.

The university offers undergraduate, postgraduate, research degree programmes, and professional diploma and certificate programmes. The institute was inaugurated by the Gujarat Chief Minister Narendra Modi on 22 July 2010.

The university has been upgraded as Rashtriya Raksha University, a national university, as an Institution of National Importance through the Rashtriya Raksha University Act, passed by Parliament in October 2020.

== History ==
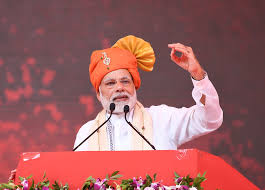
Shri Narendra Modi, Former Chief Minister of Gujarat, inaugurated Raksha Shakti University.

It was established as Raksha Shakti University in 2009 by the Government of Gujarat, led by the then Chief Minister Narendra Modi. It was created by Act 14 passed in the Gujarat Legislative Assembly. In 2020, via Act 31 of Parliament of India, the university upgraded to Rashtriya Raksha University. The university was set up to provide youth with better academic qualifications in the fields of counter-terrorism, counter-insurgency, internal security, forensic science, digital forensic, and cyber security. It lays great emphasis on professional security, strategy and defence education.

== Campuses ==
No.	Name	City	State / UT
1	RRU Main Campus	Gandhinagar	Gujarat
2	RRU Arunachal Pradesh Campus	Pasighat	Arunachal Pradesh
3	RRU Uttar Pradesh Campus	Lucknow	Uttar Pradesh
4	RRU Karnataka Campus	Shivamogga	Karnataka
5	RRU Puducherry Campus	Puducherry	Puducherry
6	RRU Madhya Pradesh Campus	Bhopal	Madhya Pradesh

On 12 March 2022, the university after being dedicated to the nation was given the mandate to establish its campuses all across the country to produce trained manpower for the security organizations of India, by the Prime Minister of India, Shri Narendra Modi, and the Minister of Home Affairs and Cooperation Minister, Shri Amit Shah. RRU at present has multiple campuses, with the first and main campus in Gandhinagar, Gujarat.

=== Rashtriya Raksha University, Gandhinagar Campus ===
The main campus of RRU is located in Gandhinagar. The site is abutted by a 1.5 km stretch of Meshwo River across 232 acres on the southern boundary. The university follows a distinct TREE model (Training, Research, Education, Extension), and has 13 schools imparting training and education at UG, PG, and PhD levels. The university has received a 5-star GRIHA rating for Green Campus and acquired the Green Campus Award in 2018. The nearest railway station is Gandhinagar Railway Station and the nearest Airport is Sardar Vallabhbhai Patel International Airport and Dahegam is the nearest bus stand. The campus also has three dedicated helipads for VIP landings.

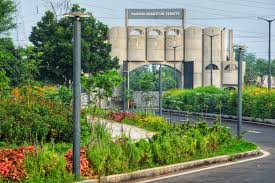
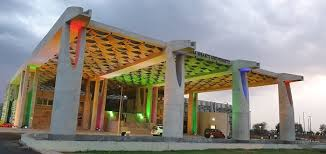

=== Rashtriya Raksha University, Arunachal Pradesh Campus ===
The university opened its first campus outside Gujarat in Arunachal Pradesh. The campus has been established under a memorandum of understanding entered into between the Government of Arunachal Pradesh and Rashtriya Raksha University. The new campus was inaugurated by the Union Home Affairs and Cooperation Minister Shri Amit Shah in the presence of Hon'ble Chief Minister of Arunachal Pradesh Shri Pema Khandu on 22 May 2022. The campus is located at Pasighat in the East Siang district of Arunachal Pradesh.

== Schools of Rashtriya Raksha University ==
1. School of IT, Artificial Intelligence, Cyber Security (SITAICS)
2. School of Applied Sciences, Engineering, and Technology (SASET)
3. School of Behavioral Sciences and Forensic Investigations (SBSFI)
4. School of Internal Security and SMART Policing (SISSP)
5. School of Integrated Coastal and Maritime Security Studies (SICMSS)
6. School of Private, Industrial and Corporate Security Management (SPICSM)
7. School of Internal Security, Defence and Strategic Studies (SISDSS)
8. School of International Cooperation, Security and Strategic Languages (SICSSL)
9. School of Criminal Law and Military Law (SCLML)
10. School of Physical Education and Sports (SPES)
11. Bharat Centre of Olympic Research and Education (BCORE)
12. Security and Scientific Technical Research Association (SASTRA)
13. School of NCC and Police Martial Music Band (SNPMMB)
14. AIC RRU Incubation Foundation

=== Security and Scientific Technical Research Association (SASTRA) ===
The Security and Scientific Technical Research Association (SASTRA) is India's first national security innovation center. Its stated objective is to facilitate a three-way engagement between academia, industry, and the government for innovation, incubation, and technology acceleration in the security space. It acts as an aggregator of solution providers who work within the problem space with an emphasis on youth engagement and "Atmanirbhar Bharat".

=== Research and publication centres ===
Research is an integral part of the activities of RRU. The university conducts research within its academic programmes under all the schools to study & explore semi-structured & unstructured problems.

One of the major research studies carried out is by Dr. Sumit Kumar Choudhary, from the Department of Forensic Science. It has busted a myth around 'Corrugated Lines as Evidence of Forgery' on which many forensic handwriting experts have relied to date.

RRU regularly organizes Seminars, Conferences, TOTs, Workshops, Awareness Programs, and Value-Added Courses among others. It always keeps a leading position in organizing seminars like National level Research Methodology workshop sponsored by ICSSR, International Conference on Police Science and national seminar on IPR and Cyber Security.

Publications by Researchers and Faculties:

• "Wonderful World of the Mounted Police in India" – A Pictorial Narration
• Criminal Justice System in India: Need for Systemic Changes
• Booklets on Police Commemoration Day
• History of Mounted Police in India

=== Training ===
RRU provides training and education to its civilian students, and personnel from various central and state police forces, agencies of the government, paramilitary forces, defense forces, and private and corporate security. The university works towards skilling aspirants for security forces, upskilling the in-service personnel, and re-skilling the ex-servicemen and women.

== Major achievements ==
The first convocation of the university was organized on 12 March 2022, that was graced by the presence of Prime Minister Narendra Modi. Along with Honorable Union Home Minister Amit Shah, Governor of Gujarat and Chief Minister of Gujarat were also present at the event.

The union government introduced a bill to upgrade the Gujarat-based Raksha Shakti University as an institution of national importance. G Kishan Reddy, Union Minister of State for Home, introduced the Rashtriya Raksha University Bill, 2020.

Amit Shah, The Union Minister for Home Affairs while speaking at the valedictory session of 47th All India Police Science Congress in December 2019, said that the government will establish 'Raksha Shakti University' and affiliated colleges in the states where there is no police university.

Raksha Shakti University had signed an MoU with Israel based ‘HackerU’ for its course of PG Diploma in Cyber Forensics since 2017–18.

Arjun Ram Meghwal, Minister of State for Parliamentary Affairs, Water Resources, River Development and Ganga Rejuvenation, awarded the Merit trophy to Raksha Shakti University at the 14th National Youth Parliament Competition, 2017–18.

Forensic psychologist Reena Sharma while pursuing her Ph.D. from RRU opted for the positive criminology route and assessed violent behaviour of 110 prison inmates convicted under heinous offenses like murder, rape, etc. She convinced the prison authorities to set up a psychological cell in Sabarmati Jail, Ahmedabad, Gujarat.

RRU has signed a memorandum of understanding with India Navy for collaboration for innovation and research in the field of defense. RRU was praised by Defence Minister Shree Rajnath Singh on the occasion.

=== Placements ===
The Internship & Placement Division of Rashtriya Raksha University endeavours to facilitate and provide suitable placement in reputed multinationals, government organizations, and the private sector. All students of the university are entitled to placement assistance, need-based training, and counselling for employment. The division assures support to the visiting organizations at every stage of the placement by making the university infrastructure available to them.

The Internship & Placement Division acts as an interface between the recruiters and the students for primarily enabling the students to select the best available option for their career. The division liaises with the recruiters to provide suitable jobs to the students completing their studies from the university and the section continues to facilitate the students who have already graduated from the university depending upon the requirements of the recruiters and alumni. The division conducts extra classes and mock interviews to enable and prepare the students to become successful professionals.

== Student life ==
=== Student accommodation ===
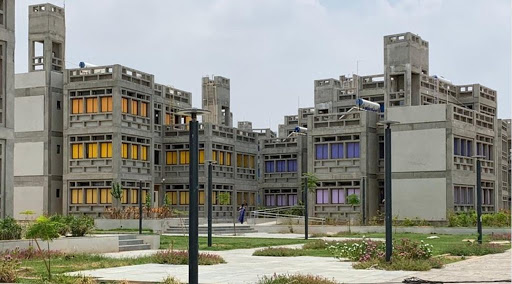

The residences for students are anticipated as not just hostels with long corridors but rather as homes. These courtyard homes are put together forming a hierarchy of communities. When a cluster of homes come together they start sharing sports facilities such as badminton courts and playgrounds.

=== Events ===
NCX and NCIIPC: RRU seeks expressions of interest for conducting events such as the Bharat NCX and NCIIPC SEC-EX.

Cultural Events: They host events like Navya, which features a range of activities like no-flame cooking, treasure hunts, and debate competitions. Additionally, the university has a student-driven Event Management Club that coordinates various events. RRU's Eventique is also a notable event that involves various activities.

Campus Celebrations: RRU hosts various cultural and festive events like Garba Navratri, Ram Navmi, Ganesh Chaturthi, Onam, Rangratri, Makar Sankranti, and Maha Shivaratri.

Sangram is a sports fest of RRU, which is organized every year. Various outdoor games such as Lawn Tennis, Swimming, Kabaddi, Kho-Kho, Cricket, Badminton, Volleyball, Athletics, and Indoor Games like Chess and Table Tennis provide an opportunity for sports enthusiasts so that they can show their skills and passion towards sports.

== Impact ==
=== Training ===
Rashtriya Raksha University is set to define a training module for commandos of Special Protection Group. The SPG protects the prime minister and their family members residing with them at the official residence.

== See also ==
- Indian National Defence University
- Law enforcement in India
- Sardar Patel University of Police, Security and Criminal Justice
