= Mentha River =

River in Rajasthan, India

Coordinates: 26°58′56″N 75°01′47″E

Location
- Country: India
- State: Rajasthan
- District: Jaipur District, Sikar District, Nagore District

Physical characteristics
- Source: Manoharpura hills
  - location: Jaipur District
- Mouth: Sambhar Lake

Basin features
- Cities: Devli Kalan; Kishangarh Renwal

The Mentha River also known Mendha river is a river in the northwestern region of India. It originates from Manoharpura hills, located in Jaipur District, and flows through the Sikar District & Nagore District before eventually emptying into Sambhar Lake. The river follows a northward course, contributing to the freshwater inflow of the lake.

== Course ==
The Mentha River starts its journey at the Hills of Manoharpura(North Part of Aravali in Rajasthan) in the district of Jaipur Rural. From there, it flows through various landscapes and geographical features until it reaches Nagore District. The river passes through this town, playing a significant role in the local ecosystem.

== Confluence with Sambhar Lake ==
The final destination of the Mentha River is the Sambhar Lake. The river flows into the lake from the north, enriching the lake's freshwater resources. This confluence has implications for both the river's ecosystem and the overall health of Sambhar Lake.

== Importance ==
The Mentha River serves as an important watercourse in the region. Its origins, path through Nagore, and eventual entry into Sambhar Lake have ecological and cultural significance. The river and its surroundings support diverse flora and fauna, making it an essential part of the local environment.

== See also ==
- Manoharpura
- Jaipur
- Nagore
- Sambhar Lake
