= Retili River =

- Interactive Map

Location
- Country: India
- State: Madhya Pradesh, Rajasthan
- District: Baran, Rajasthan

Physical characteristics
- Mouth: Andheri River
  - location: Ganeshpura (Chhipabarod)
  - coordinates: 24°40′33″N 76°47′02″E

The Retili River is a river in India, originating near Gopalgarh village in Madhya Pradesh and flowing in Bara district of Rajasthan. It joins the Andheri River near Ganeshpura village (Chhipa Barod).

== Course ==
The Retili River flows through the states of Madhya Pradesh and Rajasthan.

== See also ==
- List of rivers of India
