= Kalisil River =

River in Rajasthan, India

The River Kalisil is a river in Rajasthan, India. It originates in the hills near Rajpura village in Sawai Madhopur District. The river flows generally southwest, partly through hills and partly in the plains of Sawai Madhopur District, for about 48 km, before joining the Morel River.
