= Menali River =

River in Rajasthan, India

The Menali River is a right bank tributary of the Banas River. It joins the Banas along with the Berach River near Mandalgarh in the Indian state of Rajasthan, forming a Triveni Sangam.
