= Somesar =

- rural
- Somesar
- Location in Rajasthan, India Somesar (India)
- Coordinates: 25.53°N 73.45°E
- Country: India
- State: Rajasthan
- Talukas: Shergarh

Government
  - Body: Gram Panchayat

Population (2011)
  - Total: 2,588

Languages
  - Official: Marwari, Hindi
- Time zone: UTC+5:30 (IST)
- PIN: 342021
- Telephone code: 0291
- ISO 3166 code: RJ-IN
- Vehicle registration: RJ-19
- Sex ratio: 867 ♂/♀
- Lok Sabha constituency: Jodhpur
- Vidhan Sabha constituency: shergarh
- Civic agency: Gram Panchayat
- Avg. annual temperature: 30 °C (86 °F)
- Avg. summer temperature: 44 °C (111 °F)

Somesar is a kasba in Shergarh tehsil of district in Rajasthan state of India.

== Transport ==
Its railway station was modernised under Amrit Bharat Scheme in 2026. The station was inaugurated by Prime Minister Narendra Modi through a video conference.
