= Banganga River =

There are several Banganga Rivers in India.

- Banganga River (Jammu and Kashmir), a river of northern India
- Banganga River (Maharashtra), a small tributary of the Godavari River in the Nashik district
- Banganga River (Rajasthan), originates from the Bairath hills in Jaipur
