= Mansi Wakal Dam =

Dam in Rajasthan, India

- Location within Rajasthan Location within India
- Interactive map of Mansi Wakal Dam
- Country: India
- Location: Jhadol tehsil, Rajasthan
- Coordinates: 24.476518°N 73.487928°E
- Construction began: 2000
- Opening date: 2005
- Construction cost: ₹60 crore (US$6.3 million)

Dam and spillways
- Impounds: Mansi River

Reservoir
- Active capacity: 24,400,000 m^{3} (19,781 acre⋅ft)

Mansi Wakal is a dam on the Mansi River in Udaipur district, Rajasthan, India.

Located approximately 7 kilometres north of the village of Jhadol, the dam forms a reservoir which can hold about 24.4 million cubic metres of water. The reservoir primarily provides drinking water to the city of Udaipur, accounting for 23% of the city's drinking water supply. Additionally, the reservoir supplies drinking water to rural areas of Udaipur district and water for industrial uses to Hindustan Zinc.

Mansi Wakal dam is part of an inter-basin transfer scheme called 'Mansi Wakal I' under which water is transferred from the Sabarmati basin to the Bherach basin. The dam was constructed between 2000-2005 by the Government of Rajasthan at a cost of ₹60 crore (US$6.3 million) with monetary contributions from Hindustan Zinc in the ratio of 70:30. Some local groups opposed the construction of the dam mainly over displacement concerns.
