= Umarwas, Rajasthan =

Village in Rajasthan, India

Umarwas उमरवास
- Village
- Location in Rajasthan, India
- Coordinates: 25°20′30″N 73°42′59″E
- Country: India
- State: Rajasthan
- District: Rajsamand
- Tehsil: Kumbhalgarh

Area
  - Total: 762.78 km^{2} (294.51 sq mi)

Population (2011)
  - Total: 1,164
- Postal code: 313333

Umarwas (उमरवास) is a village located in the Kumbhalgarh tehsil of Rajsamand district in the state of Rajasthan, India. It is situated 45 km away from the sub-district headquarters, Kumbhalgarh (tehsildar office), and 50 km away from the district headquarters, Rajsamand. According to the 2011 Census, the location code or village code of Umarwas village is 096824. Umarwas is also a gram panchayat.

The total geographical area of the village is 762.78 hectares. The village has a total population of 1,164 people, out of which the male population is 555, and the female population is 609. The literacy rate of Umarwas village is 40.21%, with 52.07% of males and 29.39% of females being literate. There are about 274 houses in Umarwas village.

Amet is the nearest town to Umarwas for all major economic activities, which is approximately 25 km away.

== Population ==
Population of Umarwas
| Particulars | Total | Male | Female |
|---|---|---|---|
| Total Population | 1,164 | 555 | 609 |
| Literate Population | 468 | 289 | 179 |
| Illiterate Population | 696 | 266 | 430 |

== Connectivity ==
Connectivity of Umarwas
| Type | Status |
|---|---|
| Public Bus Service | Available within 5+ km distance |
| Private Bus Service | Available within the village |
| Railway Station | Available within 50+ km distance |

== Nearby Villages of Umarwas ==
- Mawa Ka Gurha
- Teja Ka Gurha
- Khara Asan
- Asan Bansa
- Bansa
- Bori

== Villages in Umarwas Gram Panchayat ==
- Asan Bansa
- Bansa
- Bori
- Choondawaton Ka Khera
- Dheeloria
- Kakariya
- Kharni Khera
- Kitela
- Mawa Ka Gurha
- Saras Ka Gurha
- Teja Ka Gurha
