= Bamani =

Bamani (Vita) Bamanikars
- village
- Bamani
- Nickname: Bamanikar
- Location in Maharashtra, India
- Coordinates: 17°11′00″N 74°34′48″E
- Country: India
- State: Maharashtra
- District: Sangli district
- Talukas: Khanapur (Vita)

Government
  - Body: Gram panchayat

Population (2011)
  - Total: 2,065

Languages
  - Official: Marathi
- Time zone: UTC+5:30 (IST)
- Postal code: 415311
- ISO 3166 code: IN-MH
- Vehicle registration: MH10
- Nearest city: Vita
- Lok Sabha constituency: Sangli
- Vidhan Sabha constituency: Khanapur-Atpadi
- Website: maharashtra.gov.in

Bamani (Vita) is a village in the Khanapur taluka of Sangli district in Maharashtra, India. Bamani is 14 km away from the prominent city Vita and 5 km from Vita-Tasgaon road. The village is surrounded by the villages Pare, Mangrul, Ghatimbi, Chinchni, Padli, Visapur, Limb, and Hatnur. Bamani comes under Khanapur-Atpadi state constituency and Sangli parliamentary constituency. Vita-Kavthe Mhankal state road goes through Bamani. It is the last village in Khanapur Taluka mainly concentrated on an agricultural economy. Bamani has many animal husbandry farms with buffaloes, cattle, goats, and poultry.

Grapes, sugar cane, wheat, corn, soybeans, paddy and pomegranates are mainly grown throughout the village. Agriculture has suffered from the scanty rainfall that is experienced year after year. The village has got benefit from the Tembhu irrigation project which is under final completion phase. There are two small sub-rivers (nalas or odhas) in Bamani. One originates in the upper Ghats and the other, in Benda lake. The rivers maintain a stable ground water level. The water also comes to the sub-river through Tembu Yojna.

== Population ==
As of the 2011 India census, the population of the village is 2065, 1005 male and 1060 female, in 460 families. 207 are children aged 6 or less, 10.02% of the village population.

Hinduism is the main religion, with surnames like Shinde, Patil, Shelke, Sapkal, Mane, Lengare, Lavate, Waghmode, Thombare, Sorte, Mali, and Jadhav. Dewang Koshti and 96 kuli Marathas constitute the prominent community.

== Rajewalli Yatra(religious function) ==
- Every year Rajewalli Yatra of Pir Baba is held on next day of auspicious Hindu religious occasion of Gudi Padwa. There are many functions on the occasion. Functions like tamasha, orchestra and village wrestling are conducted in village. Outside relatives of villagers come to Bamani for celebrations on the occasion. Animal sacrifice of goat is offered to Rajewalli Pir. The occasion is celebrated by both Hindus and Muslims.

== Places of tourist interest in Bamani ==
- Temples: Sidhanath Temple, Maruti Temple, Mahadev Temple, Mayakka Temple, Pir Majar, Bhawani Temple, Datta Temple, Biroba Temple, and Jotiba Temple;
- Bamani has a good concrete full ring of soil wrestling with capacity of around 300 spectators;
- Bamani has many reservoirs with dams and small lakes with natural scenery.

== Industries in Bamani ==
- Bamani has a sugar mill named Udgiri Sugar factory. The sugar mill generates much employment in the region. The sugar mill is on Pare-Bamani road.
- Vita MIDC is 8 km from Bamani

== Education in Bamani ==
- Bamani has a zilla parishad school up to class 7th. The school is located on Chinchni road.
- For higher class after 7th, students have to go to Gatimbi or Vita.
- Children attend Adarsh Public school, Vita and other nearby schools via school buses.
- The Engineering and Diploma College Adarsh Institute of Technology and Research, in Vita is just 8 km away.

== Healthcare in Bamani ==
- Bamani has a state-government-owned primary health care centre on Limb road.

== Areas in Bamani ==
- Most of population of village lives in the main Gavthan.
- Some residents live in Lengare mala, Bendi mala, Mane mala, and Jyotiba mala.

== Transport in Bamani ==
- Bamani is connected to Vita by frequent state-run S.T. buses.
- Prominent roads are Kavthe-Mhankal road, Mangrul road, Pare road, Chinchani road, Visapur road, and Limb road.

== Places of tourist around Bamani ==
- Saubai Temple is just 3 km from Bamani.
- Sidhnath Temple, Kharsundi, 30 km
- Biroba Temple, Arewadi, 70 km
- Lord Revansiddha Temple, 8 km
- Sagreshwar Sanctuary, 30 km
- Mayani Migratory Bird Sanctuary, 20 km
- ISKON Temple, 34 km, near Tasgaon.
- Mahankaleshwar Temple, 9 km
- Panchmukhi Ganpati Temple in Shivaji Chowk
- Akara Mukhi Maruti Mandir in Alsand
