= Liladi River =

Lildi River

Location
- Country: India
- State: Rajasthan
- District: Pali district

Physical characteristics
- Source
  - location: Hills near Jawaja, Ajmer region
- Mouth
  - location: Merges with Luni River

The Lildi River is a river in the Pali district of Rajasthan, India. It originates in the hills near Jawaja in the Ajmer region and flows through Bali district before ultimately merging with the Luni River.
