= Suri River =

Location
- Country: India
- State: Rajasthan

Physical characteristics
- Source
  - location: Hills near Kanst village, Dausa
  - coordinates: 26°44′N 76°25′E
- Mouth
  - location: Banganga river
  - coordinates: 26°53′N 76°30′E
- Length: 18 km (11 mi)
- Basin size: 76 km²

The Suri River is a river located in the region of Dausa. It originates in the hills near Kanst village and flows until it joins the Banganga river. The river has a length of approximately 18 km (11 mi) and a drainage area of about 76 km^{2} (29 sq mi). The Suri River originates at a latitude of 26°44' to 26°53' N and a longitude of 76°25' to 76°30' E. It eventually converging with the Banganga river at its mouth. The river flows for a distance of 18 km (11 mi), meandering through the hills and valleys near Kanst village in Dausa.

The Suri River is not known to have any major tributaries due to its relatively short length and limited drainage area.

== See also ==
- Banganga
- Rivers of India
