= Meshwo River =

Meshwo
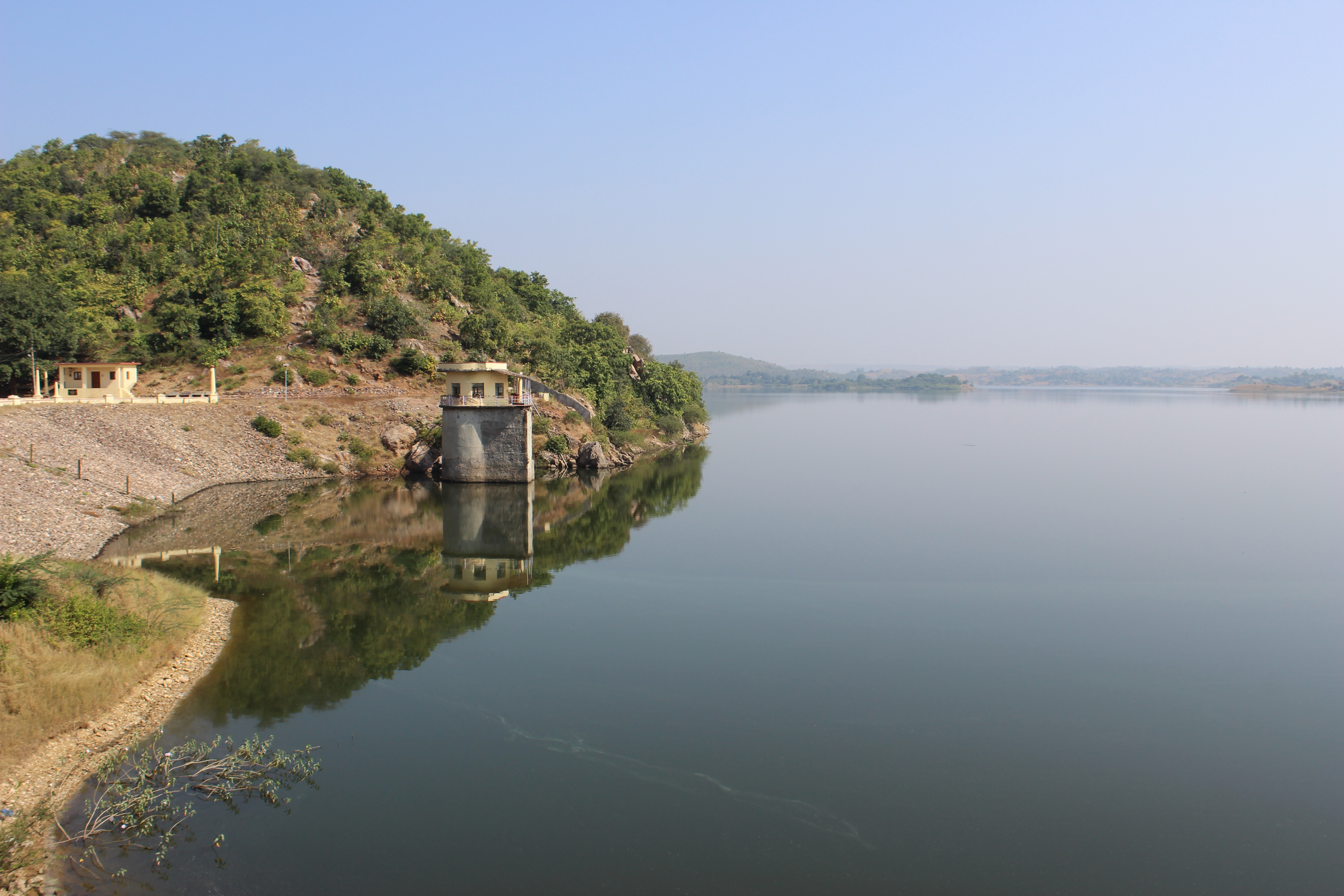
- Meshwo Reservoir at Shamlaji
- Native name: મેશ્વો (Gujarati)

Location
- Country: India
- State: Gujarat, Rajasthan

Physical characteristics
- Mouth
  - coordinates: 22°48′03″N 72°39′48″E
- Length: 203 km (126 mi)

Meshwo or Meshwa is a river flowing in the north and central parts of Gujarat, India. It is the tributary of the Sabarmati and subtribunary of the Vatrak River. It rises in the Panchara hills of Aravalli range in the Dungarpur district of Rajasthan and enters Gujarat at Shamlaji.

== Basin ==
Meshwo rises in Aravalli range and flows through Modasa, Bhiloda, Prantij of Sabarkantha and Aravalli district; Ahmedabad district and Kheda district. Meshwo meets Vatrak after near to Kheda. Meshwo flows parallel to Khari River for 203 kilometres. 8 villages of Bhiloda Taluka, 17 villages of Modasa Tauka and 12 villages of Ahmedabad and Kheda district are inhabited on Meshwo.

== Dams ==
Bombay Presidency had planned to construct dam on the river in 1926 but dropped idea after facing oppose from the Idar State. In 1945 it had been planned again and land was surveyed in 1947 for it. Permission to construct the dam was given in 1950 and the work was completed in the same year.

Another dam on the Meshwo was constructed near the Shamlaji in year 1968-69 while the construction work begun in 1957-58. It costed more than ₹315 lakh (equivalent to ₹316 crore or US$33 million in 2023) for construction. Lake built after the dam has capacity to provide water for irrigation in 17.21 thousand hector land. Meshwo has peakup weir dam constructed near Raska village of Mahemdavad Taluka and the scheme was started to provide drinking water to Ahmedabad in 2000.

== Notable places on bank of Meshwo ==
- Shamlaji, Hindu pilgrimage site
- Devni Mori, historical site
- Rashtriya Raksha University, Institute of National Importance
