= Gunjali River =

River in Madhya Pradesh and Rajasthan, India

Location
- Country: India
- State: Madhya Pradesh; Rajasthan

Physical characteristics
- Source: Madhya Pradesh, Ratangarh Tahsil, Nimach District
- Mouth: Chambal River
  - location: Arnia Village
  - coordinates: 24°45′58″N 75°29′17″E

The Gunjali River is a river in India that originates in the hills of Ratangarh Tahsil in the Nimach District of Madhya Pradesh. It flows eastward and enters Chittorgarh District near Daulatpura. The river then passes through the areas of Moren, Amarganj, and Kua Khera within Chittorgarh District. Finally, it joins the Chambal River at Arnia Village.

== Geography ==
The Gunjali River flows through the scenic landscapes of Madhya Pradesh and Rajasthan, providing water resources and supporting local ecosystems.

== See also ==
- Chambal River
- Rivers of India
