= Aalaniya River =

River in Rajasthan, India

Alania River

Location
- Country: India
- State: Rajasthan

Physical characteristics
- Source: Hills of Mukundwara
- Mouth: Chambal River, Ladpura, Kota
- Length: 75 km (47 mi)
- Basin size: 1,150 km^{2} (440 sq mi)

The Alania River is a tributary of the Chambal River in the Indian state of Rajasthan. It rises from the hills of Mukundwara and flows for 75 kilometers (47 miles) before joining the Chambal River at Notna village, Ladpura, Kota. The Alania River is a perennial river and is an important source of water for irrigation and drinking water in the region.

The Alania River is home to a variety of flora and fauna, including crocodiles, turtles and fish. The river is also a popular destination for fishing and boating.

The Alania River is an important natural resource for the people of Rajasthan. It provides water for irrigation, drinking water and recreation.
