= Kothari River =

River in India

Coordinates: 25°20′N 75°04′E

The Kothari River rises from the Aravalli hills near Devgarh in the Rajsamand district in the state of Rajasthan. It flows through the tehsils (districts) of Raipur, Mandal, Bhilwara and ultimately joins the river Banas at Nandrai. The Meja Dam on the Kothari river provides drinking water to the Bhilwara district. Meja Dam is situates in Meja village, Tehsil- Mandal.
