= Palasan River =

River in the Alwar District, Rajasthan

Physical characteristics
- Source
  - location: Near Rajpura village, Alwar District
  - coordinates: 27°02′N 76°25′E
- Mouth
  - location: Near Indiana village
  - coordinates: 27°18′N 76°49′E
- Length: 48 km (30 mi)
- Basin size: 539 km^{2} (208 sq mi)

The Palasan River is a river located in the Alwar District of Rajasthan. It has a basin size of approximately 539 km^{2} (208 sq mi) and merges with Banganga River after 48 km (30 mi).
