= Wakal River =

River in India

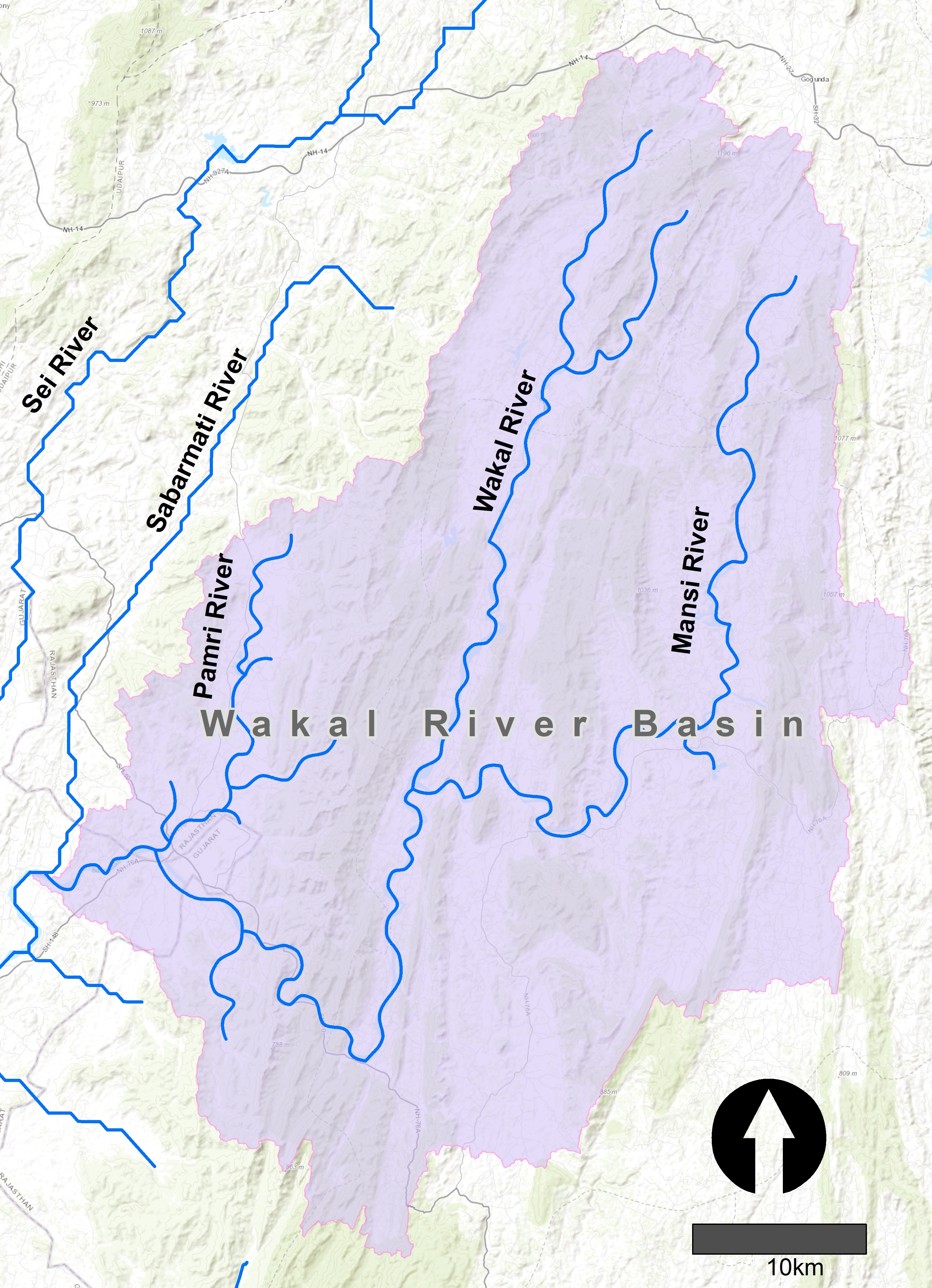
- Wakal River basin

Location
- Country: India
- State: Rajasthan and Gujarat

Physical characteristics
- Source: Udaipur district, Rajasthan
- Mouth: Sabarmati River
  - coordinates: 24°20′27″N 73°06′31″E
- Basin size: 1851 square kilometres

The Wakal River is a tributary to the Sabarmati River in Rajasthan and Gujarat states of India.

== Course ==
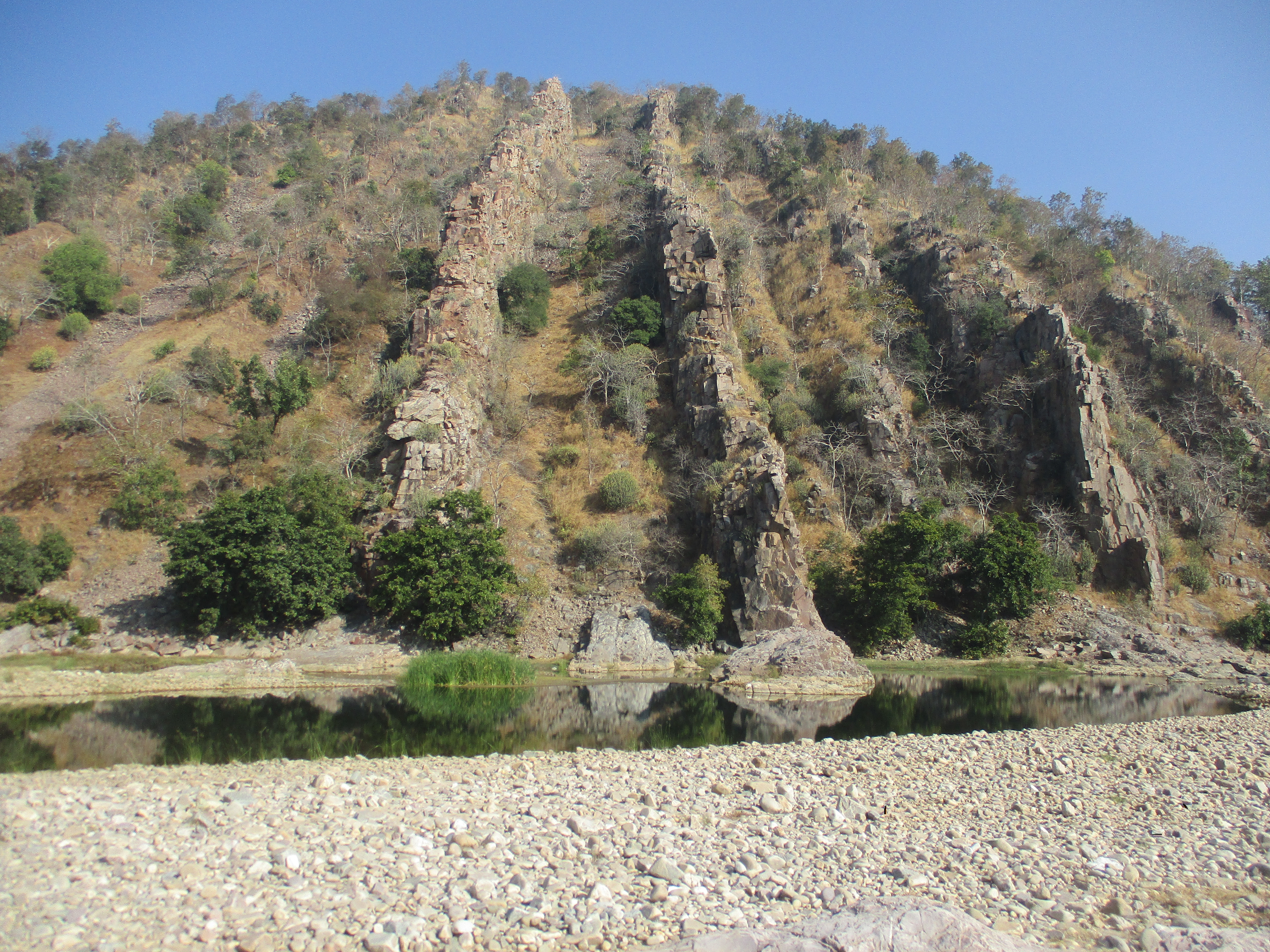
Wakal River in the Phulwari ki Naal National Wildlife Sanctuary

The river originates in the south-western spurs of the Aravalli range, and meets the Sabarmati River after traversing a distance of 158 kilometres. The Mansi and Parvi are two main tributaries of the Wakal River.

== Watershed ==
The area of the Wakal River's watershed is 1851 square kilometres, and is spread out over Udaipur district of Rajasthan and Sabarkantha district of Gujarat. 98% of the basin area lies in Rajasthan, the remainder in Gujarat. The mean annual surface water yield for the basin is 319.4 million cubic metres.

There are 24 minor irrigation projects in the watershed, with a total live storage capacity of 65.98 million cubic metres. The Mansi Wakal Dam is the largest dam in the basin.
