= Bandi River, eastern Rajasthan =

River in Jaipur, Rajasthan, India

Bandi River

Location
- Country: India
- State: Rajasthan

Physical characteristics
- Source: Samod hills, Chomu tehsil
- Mouth: Mansi river, Tonk district

The Bandi River is the second most important river in the Jaipur district of Rajasthan, India. It originates from the Samod hills of Chomu tehsil and flows through Shahapura, Chomu, Phulera, and Phagi tehsils before entering the Tonk district. The Bandi River is located approximately 30 kilometers west of Jaipur and is a tributary of the Mansi River which it joins in the Tonk district.

There are three rivers in Rajasthan with the name Bandi.
