= Dai River (India) =

Dai
- Native name: डाई नदी (Hindi)

Location
- Country: India
- State: Rajasthan
- Division: Ajmer

Physical characteristics
- Source
  - location: near Nasirabad
  - coordinates: 26.2616°N 74.7323°E
- Mouth: Banas River
  - location: at Bisalpur Dam
  - coordinates: 25.9267°N 75.4527°E

Basin features
- Progression: Banas→ Chambal→ Yamuna→ Ganges→ Bay of Bengal

River Dai originates in the southeastern slopes of the Aravalli Range near Nasirabad Tehsil of Ajmer District. It flows southeast for about 40 km and east for about 56 km in Ajmer District, and for a short reach through Tonk District, before joining the Banas River near Bisalpur village in Tonk District.
