= Sukli River =

River in Rajasthan, India

Coordinates: 24°34′N 72°30′E

Sukli is a river flowing through Chittorgarh district, Rajasthan, India. Karmai and Sukli are the major tributaries of the Jakham river. Sukli Dam was built on this river.
