= Kherliganj =

- Census town
- Location in Rajasthan, India Kherliganj (India)
- Coordinates: 24.8956°N 76.6669°E
- Country: India
- State: Rajasthan
- District: Baran

Population (2001)
  - Total: 7,391

Languages
  - Official: Hindi
- Time zone: UTC+5:30 (IST)
- ISO 3166 code: RJ-IN

Kherliganj is a part of Atru city.

Kherliganj is a census town in Baran district in the Indian state of Rajasthan.

== Demographics ==
As of 2001 India census, Kherliganj had a population of 7391. Males constitute 52% of the population and females 48%. Kherliganj has an average literacy rate of 58%, lower than the national average of 59.5%: male literacy is 70%, and female literacy is 44%. In Kherliganj, 16% of the population is under 6 years of age.
