= Morel River =

- Interactive Map

Physical characteristics
- Source
  - location: Hills near Dharla and Chainpura villages, Bassi Tehsil, Jaipur District, Rajasthan, India
- 2nd source
  - location: Catchment area of foothills of Paplaj Mataji mountains, Dausa district, Rajasthan, India (Aravalli Range)
- Mouth
  - location: Near Hadoli village, Sawai Madhopur District, Rajasthan, India (joins Banas River)
- Length: Approximately 147 kilometers

Basin features
- Tributaries
  - left: Kankrauli River, Kalisil River
  - right: Dhund River

The Morel River is a river that originates in the hills near Dharla and Chainpura villages in Bassi Tehsil of Jaipur District (one branch), second branch makes by receiving water from the catchment area of foothills of Paplaj Mataji mountains, Dausa district, in the state of Rajasthan (Aravali mountain series).

It flows southeast for 29 km, then southwest for 35 km, up to its confluence with the river Dhund, and then southeast for 83 km in Jaipur, Dausa and Sawai Madhopur Districts, before joining Banas river near Hadoli of Sawai Madhopur District. Major part of Morel river flows in District Dausa and Sawai Madhopur of Rajasthan. Dausa, Lawan and Lalsot tehsils are the tehsil areas of Dausa District which contribute as major part of its water catchment area and flow route.

Major villages such as Kaluwas, Mohammedpura, Bilka, Ranoli etc. are situated on the bank of this river. Civilization of these villages is very old and this great river was called as life line of these civilizations. The village Kaluwas was situated earlier on the bank of this river but after heavy flood, the village was shifted about one kilometer away. It makes 10 km boundary between Jaipur and Dausa district. It marks the boundary between Jaipur and Dausa district by separating two villages Jhanpda Kalan (Kotkhawada-Chaksu) and Jhanpda Khurd (lalsot) respectively. After that its subsidiary Dhund river meets in Sammel village then both make a big dam in Morel area dam in Dausa Sawai Madhopur district . Then the Morel river meets in Banas river in Karoli district.

The Morel river is the main important part of the eastern Rajasthan canal project which aims to join almost 12 districts of eastern Rajasthan by 2050.

== Basin ==
The Morel River forms the Morel sub-basin of the Banas River basin in eastern Rajasthan. The Government of Rajasthan's State Irrigation Plan (SIP) identifies Morel as one of the ten sub-basins of the Banas Basin and gives its area as 5,740.50 square kilometres. The other Banas sub-basins listed in the plan are Banas, Berach, Dain, Gudia, Kalisil, Khari, Kothari, Mashi and Sodra.

The Morel basin lies in eastern Rajasthan and forms part of the Banas drainage system. Earlier geographical research has described the Morel River basin as a semi-arid basin east of the Aravalli Range, extending between approximately 26°06′27″ and 27°09′28″ N and 75°44′19″ and 76°58′49″ E, with an area of about 5,800 square kilometres.

The Morel is a tributary of the Banas River. Its drainage system includes several tributaries and associated watersheds, including the Dhund River basin. The Dhund watershed forms part of the Morel River basin, which in turn forms part of the Banas basin.

== Research history ==
The Morel River basin has been a subject of geographical research since at least the late 1980s. R. D. Doi's doctoral research examined land systems, land use and land capability in the Morel River basin. Subsequent studies addressed land capability, land evaluation, ravine land, GIS-based assessment and land utilization in the basin and its sub-catchments.
