= Mithari River =

River in Rajasthan, India

Coordinates: 25°00′N 72°52′E

Mithari is a river in Pali district originates from confluence of many small nallahs from south-western slopes of Aravalli Range in Pali district of Rajasthan state. It vanishes in Jalore district near Sankhwali village. Bali and Falna comes in its basin. Its catchment area is about 1,644 km2, in Pali and Jalore districts.

Temple Nimbeshwar is on the bank of Mithri river.
