= Sanwan River =

Location
- Country: India
- State: Rajasthan

Physical characteristics
- Source
  - location: Hills near Angri village, Alwar district
  - coordinates: 26°59′N 76°16′E
- Mouth
  - location: Confluence with the main river near Juthiara village
  - coordinates: 27°22′N 76°46′E
- Length: 95 km (59 mi)
- Basin size: 660 km^{2} (250 sq mi)

The Sanwan River is a river in India that flows through the Sanwan basin. The basin is located between latitudes 26° 59′ and 27° 22' and longitudes 76° 16' and 76° 46'. The river originates in the hills near Angri village in Alwar District. It flows southwards for 29 km, up to Sirsa Devi Bund, and then turns eastwards, covering a distance of 66 km before joining the main river near the village of Juthiara.

The catchment area of the Sanwan River basin is approximately 660 square kilometres (250 sq mi). The river plays a significant role in the local ecosystem, providing water for various purposes and supporting the surrounding communities.

== Course ==
The Sanwan River originates in the hills near Angri village in Alwar District. It first flows southwards, covering a distance of 29 km up to Sirsa Devi Bund. From there, it takes a turn and flows eastwards for 66 km before eventually meeting the main river near the village of Juthiara.

== Catchment Area ==
The catchment area of the Sanwan River basin spans approximately 660 km^{2}. This area plays a crucial role in maintaining the river's water flow and overall health.

== See also ==
- List of rivers in India
