= Chakan River =

River Chakan

Location
- Country: India
- State: Rajasthan

Physical characteristics
- Mouth: Chambal River
  - location: Sawai Madhopur District, Rajasthan

River Chakan is a left bank tributary of the Chambal River. The river flows in a south-easterly direction and joins river Chambal in Sawai Madhopur District. The catchment area of Chakan river extends over to Sawai Madhopur, Tonk, Bundi and Kota Districts.
