= Sambhar Salt Lake =

India's largest inland salt lake

The Sambhar Salt Lake is India's largest inland salt lake. It is located in Sambhar Lake Town, Jaipur district of Rajasthan, India, 80 km (50 mi) southwest of the city of Jaipur and 64 km (40 mi) northeast of Ajmer, Rajasthan. It surrounds the historical Sambhar Lake Town.

== Etymology ==
The Sambhar Lake is named after the goddess Shakambhari, who is a form of Durga, and who was the tutelary goddess of the Chauhan Rajputs.

== Geography ==
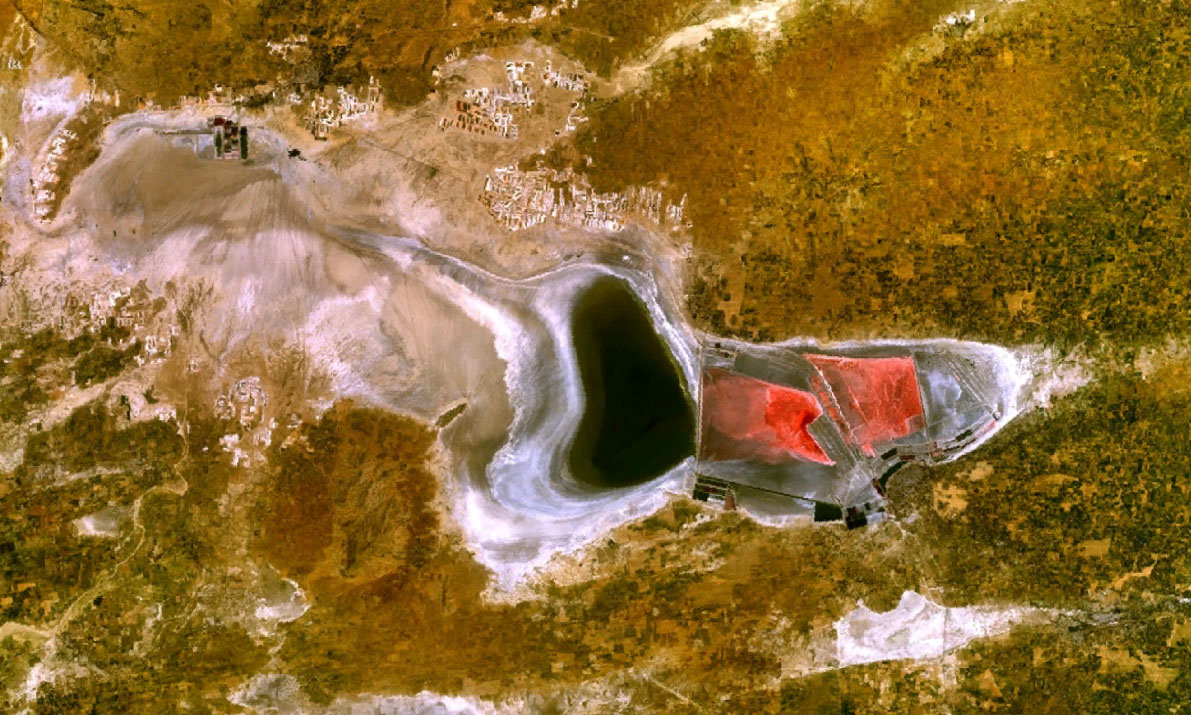
Satellite image of Sambhar Salt Lake taken in 2010, from WorldWind.

The Sambhar Lake is India's largest inland salt lake. It is located 60 km (37 mi) southwest of Jaipur, Rajasthan. The lake is a playa, or a seasonal lake with a flat bottom. It is also the largest playa in the Thar Desert.

=== Hydrology ===
Sambhar Lake
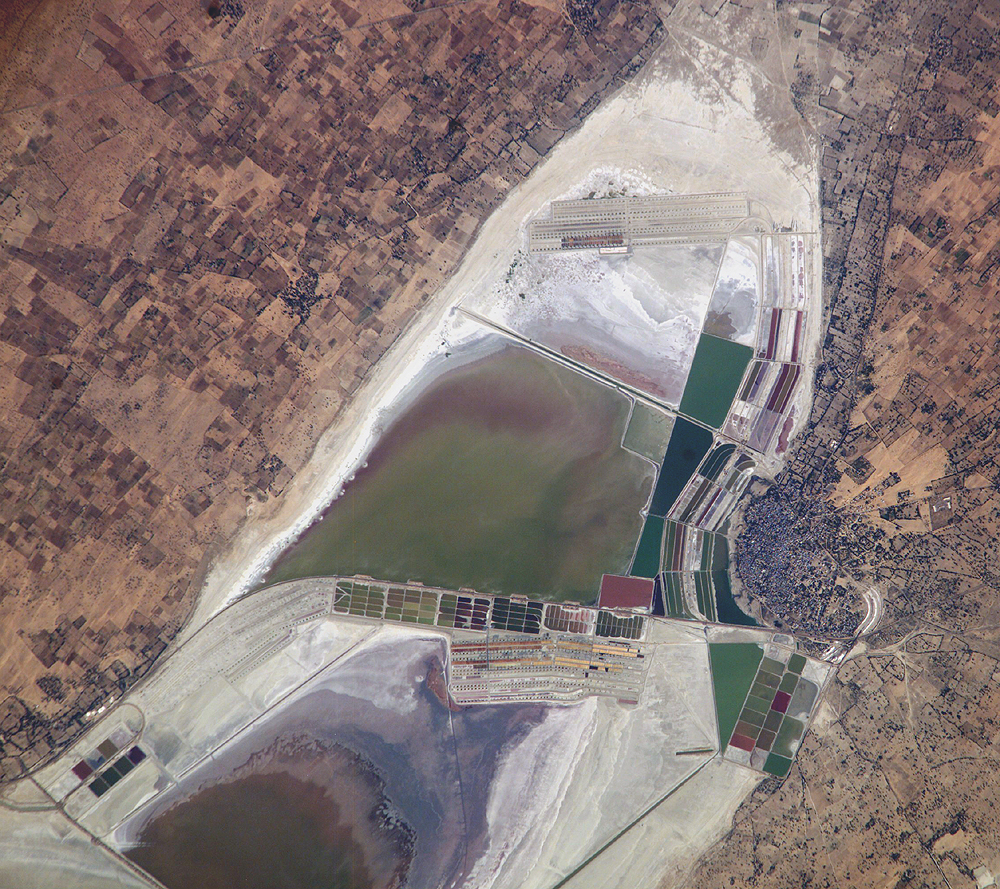
- Aerial view of Sambhar Lake in Rajasthan

- Location within Rajasthan Location within India
- Interactive map of Sambhar Lake
- Location: Sambhar Lake Town, Jaipur district, Rajasthan, India
- Coordinates: 26°56′30″N 75°04′35″E
- Type: Salt lake
- Primary outflows: Luni River
- Catchment area: 5,700 km^{2} (2,200 sq mi)
- Basin countries: India
- Designation: Ramsar Site
- Max. length: 35.5 km (22.1 mi)
- Max. width: 3 to 11 km (1.9 to 6.8 mi)
- Surface area: 190 to 2,300 km^{2} (73 to 888 sq mi)
- Average depth: 0.6 to 3 m (2.0 to 9.8 ft)
- Max. depth: 3 m (9.8 ft)
- Surface elevation: 360 m (1,180 ft)

Ramsar Wetland
- Designated: 23 March 1990
- Reference no.: 464

The Sambhar Lake is primarily fed by four ephemeral streams: Rupangarh, Mendha, Kharian and Khandel. During times of heavy rainfall, surface runoff along with three major streams, Ruprali, Bandi and Turatmati, additionally feed the lake. These streams vary in salt content which results in differing salinity levels in the lake. The lake's hypersalinity is three to four times that of sea water.

The lake has a catchment area of 5700 square km. The lake is an extensive saline wetland, with water depth fluctuating from as few as 60 centimetres (24 in) during the dry season to about 3 meters (10 ft) at the end of the monsoon season. It occupies an area of 190 to 230 square kilometers based on the season. The lake is elliptically shaped with a length of approximately 35.5 km and a breadth varying between 3 km and 11 km. The lake straddles Nagaur and Jaipur districts and borders on the Ajmer district. The circumference of the lake is 96 km, and it is surrounded by the Aravali hills on all sides.

The Sambhar lake basin is divided by a 5.1 km long dam made of sandstone. After the saltwater reaches a certain concentration, it is released from the west side to the east side by lifting dam gates. To the east of the dam are salt evaporation ponds where salt has been farmed for a thousand years. This eastern area is 80 square km and comprises salt reservoirs, canals and salt pans separated by narrow ridges. To the east of the dam is a railroad, built by the British (before India's independence) to provide access from Sambhar Lake City to the salt works.

The temperature reaches 45 °C (113 °F) in summer and goes as low as 5 °C (41 °F) in winter.

== History ==
In 1884, ancient sculpture art was discovered in the area as part of small-scale excavation work done in Sambhar Lake. During that excavation, some terracotta structures, coins, and seals were found along with a clay stupa. Sambhar sculpture art appears to be influenced by Buddhism. Later on, around 1934, a large-scale systematic and scientific excavation was conducted in which a large number of terracotta figurines, stoneware, and decorated discs were found. A number of these sculptures from Sambhar are present at the Albert Hall Museum.

The lake's salt production was managed by the Mughal dynasty, after which its ownership was shared between the princely states of Jaipur and Jodhpur.

== In mythology ==
The Indian epic Mahabharata and the 18th and 19th chapters of the Bhagavata Purana mention Sambhar town as the capital of the demon king Vrishparva. Sambhar town is also the place where Vrishparva's priest, Shukracharya, lived and where his daughter, Devayani married the emperor Yayati. A temple near the lake is dedicated to Devayani.

The goddess Shakambhari, who is a form of Durga, is believed to have created Sambhar Lake. Shakambhari was the tutelary goddess of Chauhan (Prithviraj Chauhan). According to one legend, she was pleased by their devotion when milk was offered to a holy ascetic and, as a result, turned the forest into a plain of silver. In another version of the legend, it is mentioned that the divine presence of the goddess herself turned the forest into a plain of precious jewels. The townspeople feared the jewels would cause conflict, so Shakambhari transformed them into a salt lake. The name of the lake, Sambhar, stems from a variation Shakambhari, which happened around the sixth century.

== Economy ==
The Sambhar Salt Lake is the source of most of Rajasthan's salt production. It produces 196,000 tonnes of clean salt every year, which is around 0.66% of India's salt production. Salt is produced by evaporation of brine and is mostly managed by the government-owned company Sambhar Salts Ltd. (SSL), a joint venture of the Hindustan Salts Limited and the state government. SSL owns 3% of the eastern lake.

The company is struggling to produce sufficient amount of salt but the private players are producing more than 10 times that of the company due to production from thousands of illegal borewells, which are also severely harming the ecology of the salt lake.

There are 38 clusters of villages surrounding the lake. Major settlements include Sambhar, Gudha, Jabdinagar, Nawa, Jhak, Korsina, Jhapok, Kanseda, Kuni, Tyoda, Govindi, Nandha, Sinodiya, Arwik ki dhani, Khanadja, Khakharki, Kerwa ki dhani, Rajas, Jalwali ki dhani.

In 2014, six PSUs including Bharat Heavy Electricals Limited and Power Grid Corporation of India Ltd had planned to set up the world's largest 4,000 MW Ultra-mega Solar power project in the land under the company. But after BJP government came to power in the state, the project was scrapped, citing environmental issues and shifted to Gujarat.

In 2019, the Rajasthan government started an asset-liability assessment to take over loss-making Sambhar Salts Ltd. from Hindustan Salts Ltd.

== Ecology ==
Sambhar Salt Lake was designated as a Ramsar site in 1990. The wetland is an important wintering habitat and feeding ground for migratory birds which include tens of thousands of pink flamingos. Two species of flamingoes visit the lake, the Greater Flamingo and the Lesser Flamingo and their presence is dependent upon water levels and the availability of algae. Because of the lake's high salinity, flora and fauna mainly thrive during the rainy season when salinity levels decrease.

The specialized algae and bacteria growing in the lake provide striking water colours and support the lake ecology that, in turn, sustains the migrating waterfowl. There is other wildlife in the nearby forests, where Nilgai move freely along with deer and foxes.

In 2019, more than 15,000 migratory birds died at the Lake due to avian botulism.

== Tourism ==
=== Tourism and filming destination ===
For the film Delhi-6 directed by Rakeysh Omprakash Mehra, production designer Samir Chanda recreated inner lanes of Old Delhi at Sambhar. Later for certain scenes, historic Jama Masjid was digitally added to the frame as a backdrop. Certain scenes of many other popular films have been shot around the lake and the main Sambhar Lake Town such as:

- Awarapan 2
- Delhi-6
- Veer
- Gulaal
- Highway
- Drona
- Zila Ghaziabad
- PK
- Tevar
- Goliyon Ki Raasleela Ram-Leela
- Super 30
- Bard of Blood

Songs shot:

- DJ Wale Babu, "She move it like" - Badshah
- "Car Me Music Baja" - Neha Kakkar
- "Mar Gaye Meet Gaye Lut Gaye" - Hans Raj Hans
- "Lahore, Surma Surma" - Guru Randhawa
- Paon Ki Jutti - Jaani

On the 68th Republic Day of India, Nissan GT-R set a world record in Limca Book of Records by making the largest outline of the map of India. It recreated the approximate outline of Indian map spanning 3 km in length and 2.8 km in width with a total outline periphery of 14.7 km at Sambhar Lake.

== Environmental concerns ==
Sambhar Lake, a critical migratory bird habitat, faced major avian mortality events in 2019 (18,000–23,000 birds) and 2024 (over 600 birds) due to avian botulism, triggered by environmental factors like excess rainfall, reduced salinity, and high temperatures, which foster Clostridium botulinum toxin production. Illegal human activities—including widespread salt mining, unauthorized borewells, and salt-pan encroachments—have degraded the lake’s hydrology, lowered groundwater by up to 60 meters, and reduced wetland area by 4.23% per decade. These pressures have led to biodiversity loss, with migratory bird species dropping from 30 to 21 (2021–2022) and declining flamingo nesting. Regulatory responses include National Green Tribunal orders (2016) to cancel illegal salt pans, a 2013 PIL by Naresh Kadyan targeting borewell mafia, and a salt-supply ban post-2019. Conservation recommendations emphasize habitat monitoring, carcass removal, stricter extraction controls, community engagement, and wetland restoration to safeguard Sambhar’s ecosystem and its role as a key wintering ground for migratory waterfowl. Sustained multi-agency action is critical.

- Rajasthan government confirms botulism killed thousands of birds at Sambhar Lake in Jaipur - INDIA TODAY
- सांभरझील और उसके संरक्षण से जुड़े कुछ पहलु by Dau Lal Bohra.
- Ideas for Cause Pile up but Mystery of Avian Horror at Sambhar Lake Persists
- सांभर झील पर सुबह उड़ा ड्रोन, पक्षियों की तलाश शुरू - राजस्थान पत्रिका
- Sambhar Lake: 18 हजार पक्षियों की मौत के बाद सांभर झील से नमक सप्लाई पर रोक, एनजीटी ने मांगी रिपोर्ट - दैनिक जागरण
- Sambhar lake, the death bed for thousands of birds - THE FREE PRESS JOURNAL
- राजस्थान की सांभर झील बनी कब्रगाह, 18 हजार पक्षियों की मौत - दैनिक जागरण
- Management, hydrology, salt pans — What's behind Rajasthan's bird crisis? - THE INDIAN EXPRESS
- Illegal salt mining under scanner for mass death of birds at Rajasthan's Sambhar Lake - THE PRINT
- Avian botulism: Deadly disease kills thousands of birds in Rajasthan's Sambhar Lake - THE HINDU
- Cancel illegal salt pans in Sambhar Lake: NGT bench to Rajasthan government - INDIAN EXPRESS
- Thousands of migratory birds die mysteriously in Rajasthan's Sambhar Lake
- Migratory birds retreat from a 'shrinking' Sambhar Lake : study - TIMES OF INDIA
- Public Interest Litigation (PIL) No. 108 of 2013 filed by Naresh Kadyan at the SUPREME COURT of INDIA about bore well mafia, illegal encroachments around Sambhar lake - Wetland of Rajasthan - SCRIBD.COM
- Choked on salt - DOWN TO EARTH; https://www.downtoearth.org.in/news/choked-on-salt-41030ref=true
- Sambhar - a lake no more; TIMES OF INDIA
- Sambhar lake - INDIA's largest inland source inland salt being slowly killed; INDIA TODAY
- Is it worth the salt ? - EXCAVATE.COM
- सांभर का नमक मांग रहा अब अपना हक - पत्रिका
- Private players illegally edge out government-owned Sambhar Salts in salt production - ECONOMIC TIMES
- A salty sore: the dying sambhar lake - INDIA WATERPORTAL
- Reality check: Sambhar Lake may cease to exist in few years - DNA
- Ban On Pan-well Making At Sambhar Lake - THE INDIAN SALT MANUFACTURERS ASSOCIATION
- Arrival of Lesser Flamingos declines at Sambhar Lake - THE HINDU
- "Ashok Kumar Jain, "Conservation Planning of Sambhar Lake, Rajasthan using Satellite Remote Sensing and GIS", Andhra University thesis (2005). Indian Institute of Remote Sensing" (PDF). Archived from the original (PDF) on 9 August 2011. 5.10 MiB
