= Sukri River =

River in Pali district, Rajasthan, India

- Interactive Map

Location
- Country: India
- State: Rajasthan
- District: Pali

Physical characteristics
- Source
  - location: Western slopes of Aravalli Range, near Desuri, Pali district
- 2nd source
  - location: Aravalli Range, Sojat, Gaguda, Pali district
- Mouth: Luni River
  - location: Near Samdari
- Length: 103 km – main branch; 75 km – second branch

Sukri river flows from the western slopes of Aravalli Range near Desuri in Pali district and flows through Guda Endla, Rani and Chanod. Its total length in the Pali district is 103 km. Another river of the same name originates from Aravali range and flows through Sojat and Gaguda, with total length of 75 km in Pali District. It feeds Bankli Dam, located in Jalore District and then merges with the Luni river near Samdari.
