= Guhiya River =

- Interactive Map

Location
- Country: India
- State: Rajasthan
- District: Pali

Physical characteristics
- Source
  - location: Near Khariya Neev and Tharasani, Sojot Tehsil, Rajasthan, India
- Mouth
  - location: Near Phekaria (Phenkariya), Rajasthan, India
- Basin size: 3,835 km^{2} (1,481 sq mi)

Basin features
- Tributaries
  - left: Radia Nadi, Guria Nadi, Lilri Nadi, Sukri (stream), Phunpharia

Guhiya River is a small river in Pali District of Rajasthan, India. It is an intermittent stream running only during the monsoon season and is a tributary of the Luni River.

It rises in the foothills of the Aravalli Range near the villages of Kariya Neev (Khariyaniv) and Tarasanib in Sojot Tehsil. Its tributaries include the Radia Nadi, Guria Nadi, Lilri Nadi, Sukri (stream) and Phunpharia. It joins the Bandi River near the village of Phekaria (Phenkariya) at 25°52′27″N 72°48′36″E. The catchment basin for the Guhiya river is 3,835 square kilometres (948,000 acres).
