= Banas River =

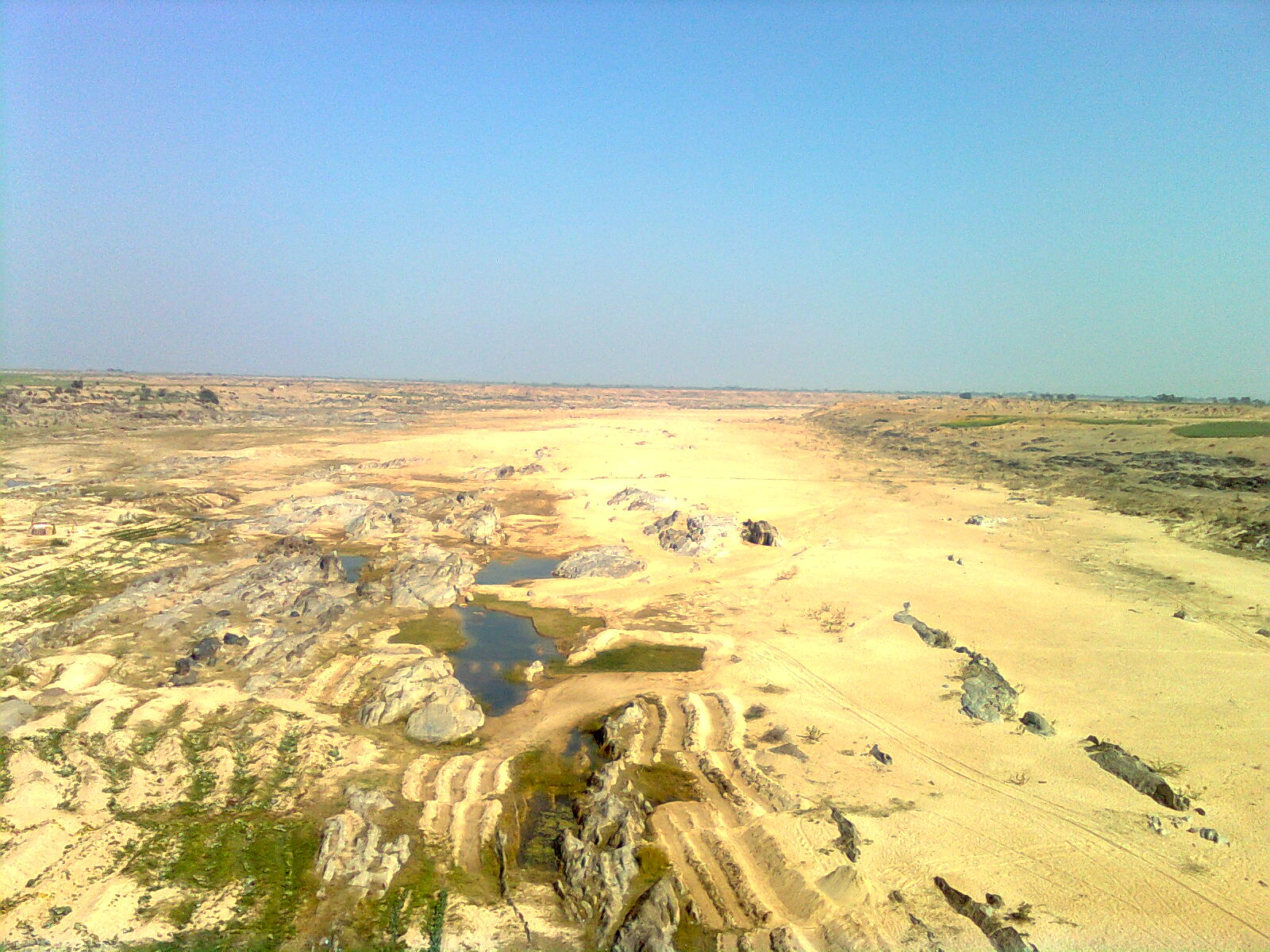
- Banas River near Kota, Rajasthan
- Interactive Map The Banas River (shown in red), a tributary of the Chambal River (shown in Saffron)
- Native name: बनास नदी (Hindi)

Location
- Country: India
- State: Rajasthan
- Cities: Kumbhalgarh in Rajsamand district, Mewar, Chambal near the village of Rameshwar in Sawai Madhopur

Physical characteristics
- Source: Aravalli ranges
  - location: Kumbhalgarh, Rajsamand district, Rajasthan, India
  - coordinates: 25°09′09″N 73°35′10″E
- Mouth: Chambal-Banas sangam confluence
  - location: near the village of Rameshwar, Sawai Madhopur, Rajasthan, India
  - coordinates: 25°54′43″N 76°44′07″E

The Banas River rises near Pindwara village of Sirohi district in Rajasthan. It lies entirely within the state of Rajasthan in western India. It is a tributary of the Chambal River, itself a tributary of the Yamuna, which in turn merges into the Ganga. The Banas is approximately 512 kilometres in length.

The name "Banaas" literally translates as "forest-hope" (Ban-aas) meaning "Hope-of-the-forest" or 'Van Ki Aasha.' The river originates in the Veron ka Math situated in Khamnor Hills of the Aravalli Range, about 5 km from Kumbhalgarh in Rajsamand district. It flows northeast through the Mewar region of Rajasthan, then across Hadavati before meeting the Chambal near the village of Rameshwar in Sawai Madhopur District.

The Banas drains a basin of 45,833 km^{2}, and lies entirely within Rajasthan. It drains the east slope of the central portion of the Aravalli Range, and the basin includes all or part of Ajmer, Bhilwara, Bundi, Chittorgarh, Dausa, Jaipur, Pali, Rajsamand, Sawai Madhopur, Sirohi, Tonk, and Udaipur districts. The cities of Nathdwara, Jahazpur, and Tonk lie on the river. Major tributaries include the right bank tributaries of Berach and Menali and the left bank tributaries of Kothari, Khari, Dai, Dheel River, Sohadara River, Morel and Mashi River. This river is known as the Virgin River because it disappears into the desert instead of flowing into the sea.

The Banas is a seasonal river that dries up during the summer, but it is nonetheless used for irrigation. The Bisalpur-Jaipur project (a dam across the Banas at Deoli, about 40 km from Tonk) was completed by the Government of Rajasthan in 2009 and it provides drinking water from the Banas to Jaipur city. Isarda Dam is an under construction dam on the Banas River.
