= Luni River =

River in northwest India

Luni River Sagarmati
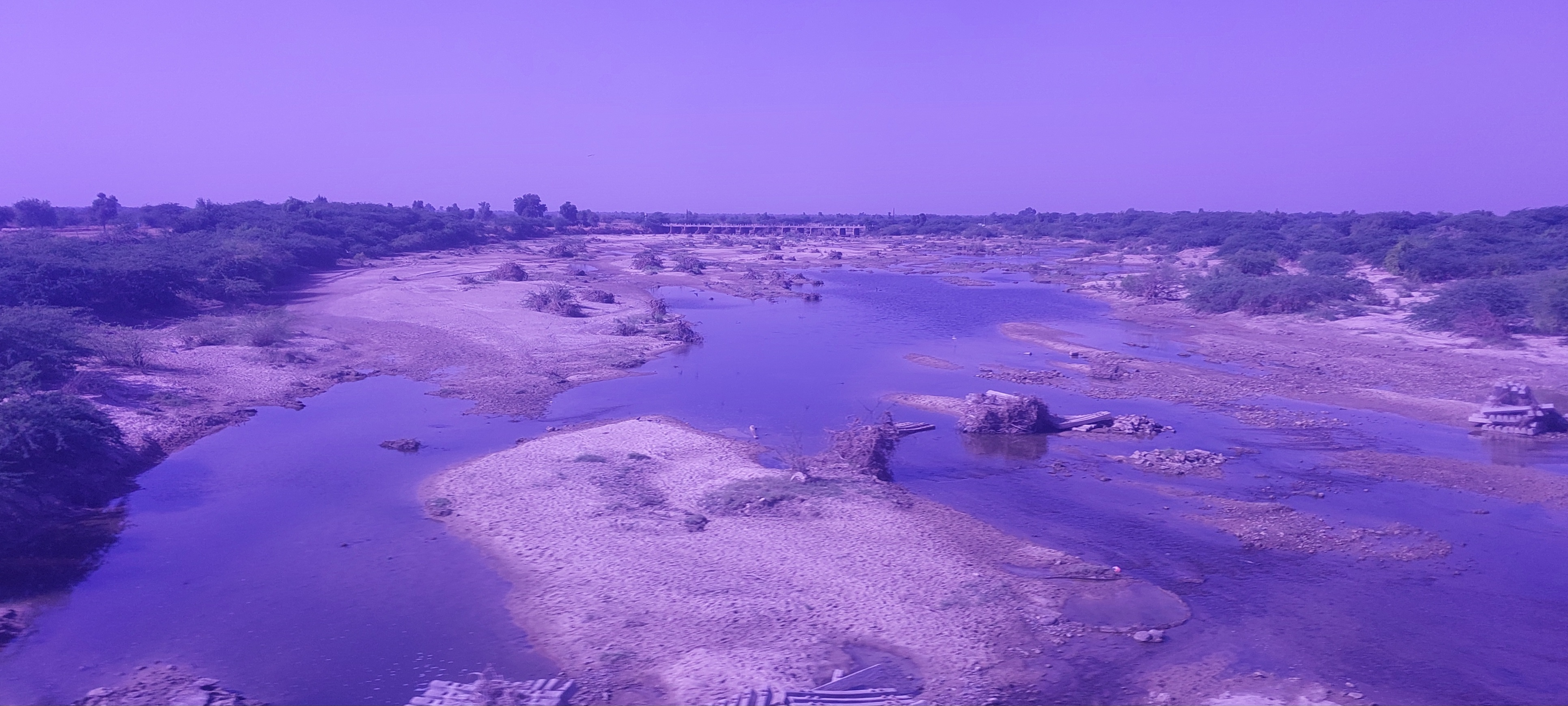

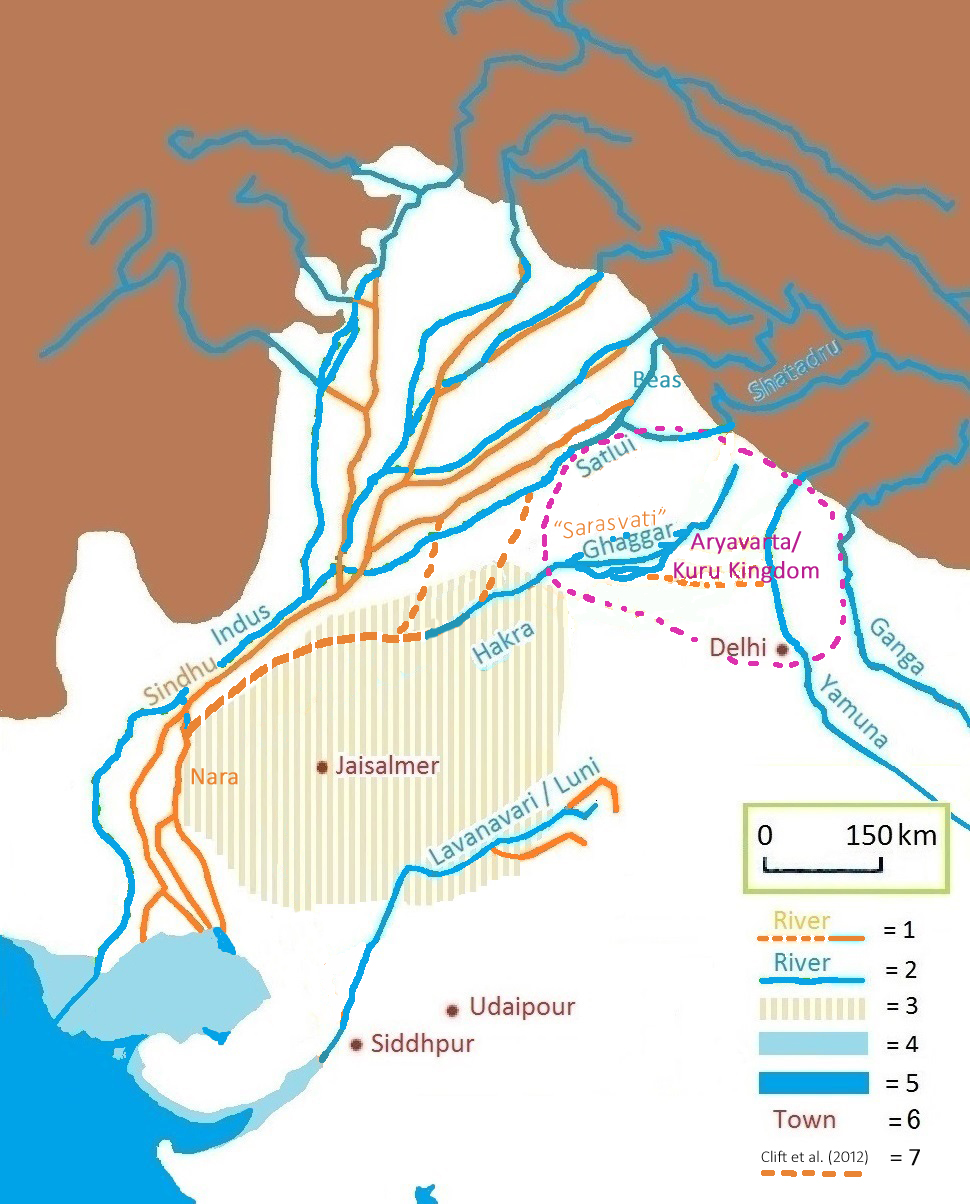
- Course of River Luni or Lavanaravi river, south of the estimated route of the ancient Sarasvati river
- Native name: Lavanavari (Sanskrit); Lavanavati (Sanskrit)

Location
- Country: India
- State: Rajasthan
- District: Ajmer, Barmer

Physical characteristics
- Source
  - location: Pushkar Valley near Ajmer
  - elevation: 550 m (1,800 ft)
- Mouth
  - location: Near Nadabet, Rann of Kutch, Gujarat
  - coordinates: 24°39′N 71°11′E
- Length: 495 km (308 mi)
- Basin size: 37,363 km^{2} (14,426 sq mi)

Basin features
- Cities: Birami, Raipur
- Tributaries
  - left: Jawai River, Sukri River, Guhiya River, Bandi River, Liladi River
  - right: Jojari River

The Luni is the largest river in the Thar Desert in Northwest India. It originates in Naga hills of the Pushkar valley of the Aravalli Range, near Ajmer, passes through the southeastern portion of the Thar Desert, and ends in the marshy lands of Rann of Kutch in Gujarat, after travelling a distance of 495 km (308 mi). It is first known as Sagarmati, then after passing Govindgarh, it meets its tributary Sarasvati, which originates from Pushkar Lake and from then on it is called Luni.

In 1892, Maharaja Jaswant Singh II of Jodhpur constructed 0 in Pichiyak village between Bilara and Bhawi of Jodhpur district. It is one of the largest artificial lakes in India and irrigates more than 12,000 acres (49 km^{2}). It is one of the internal drainage rivers in India; it does not meet the Arabian Sea. It is drained before it reaches the Arabian Sea.

== Etymology ==
The Luni is also known as the Lavanavari or Lavanavati, which means "salt river" in Sanskrit, due to the high salinity of its water.

== Overview ==
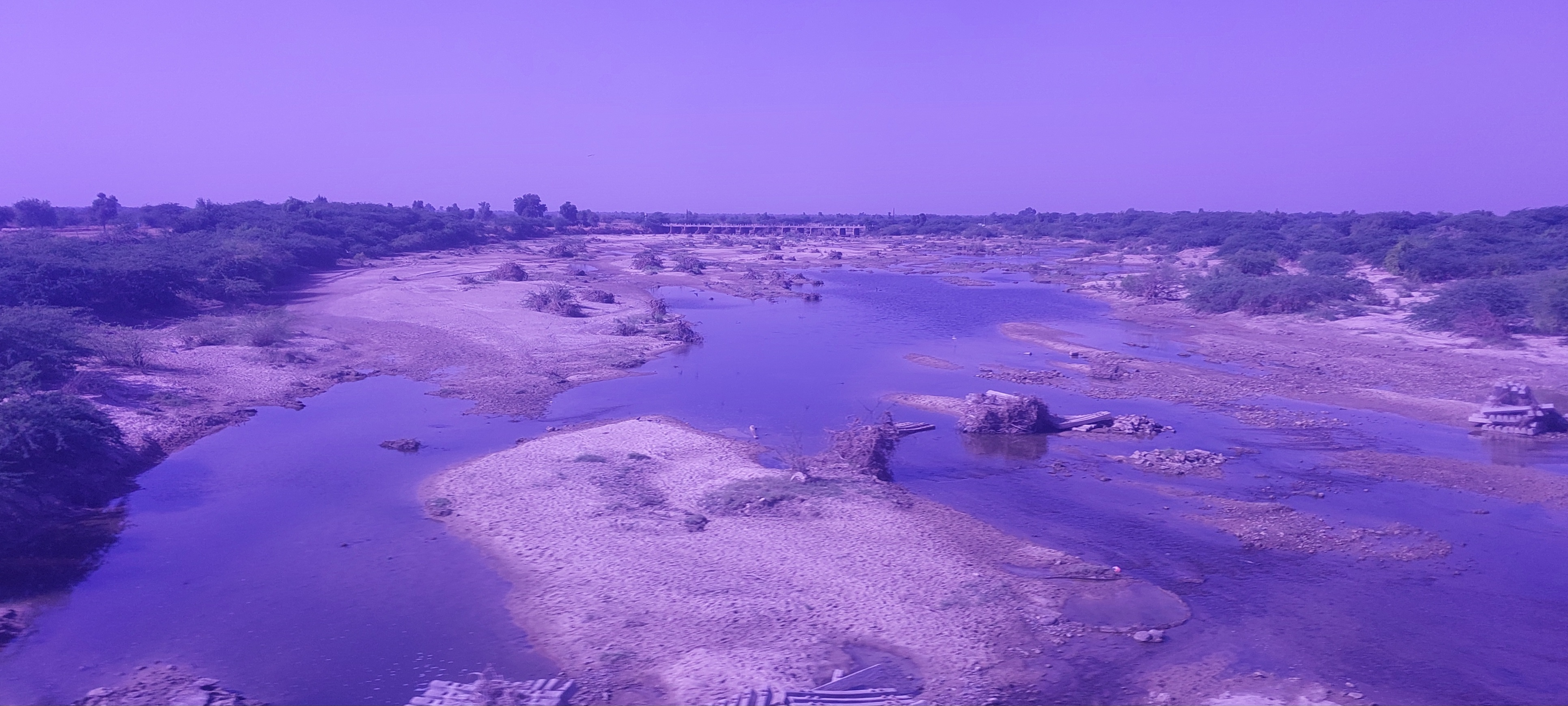
Luni river view from railway bridge of Luni town in Jodhpur district

The Luni River basin is 37,363 km^{2}, which includes all or part of the Ajmer, Barmer, Jalore, Jodhpur, Nagaur, Pali, and Sirohi districts of Rajasthan and the Banaskantha and Patan districts of northern Gujarat. Its major tributaries are the Sukri, Mithri, Bandi, Khari, Jawai, Guhiya and Sagi from the left and the Jojari from the right.

The Luni River begins near Ajmer, in the Pushkar valley of the western Aravalli Range at an elevation of about 550m. At this point, the river is also known as the Sagarmati. The river then flows in the southwest direction through the hills and plains of the Marwar region in Rajasthan. The river flows south-west and enters the Thar Desert before dissipating into the Rann of Kutch, traversing a total of 495 km. In spite of the high salinity, it is a major river in the region and serves as a primary source of irrigation. The Luni is not saline until it reaches Balotra, where high salt content in the soil impacts the river.. The Luni Basin covers an area of approximately 32,879 km² and extends from parts of the Ajmer region through Nagaur and Pali districts towards Jodhpur and Barmer before entering Jalore district.

The Luni may have been the southern portion of the historic Ghaggar-Hakra river channel.

== Tributaries ==
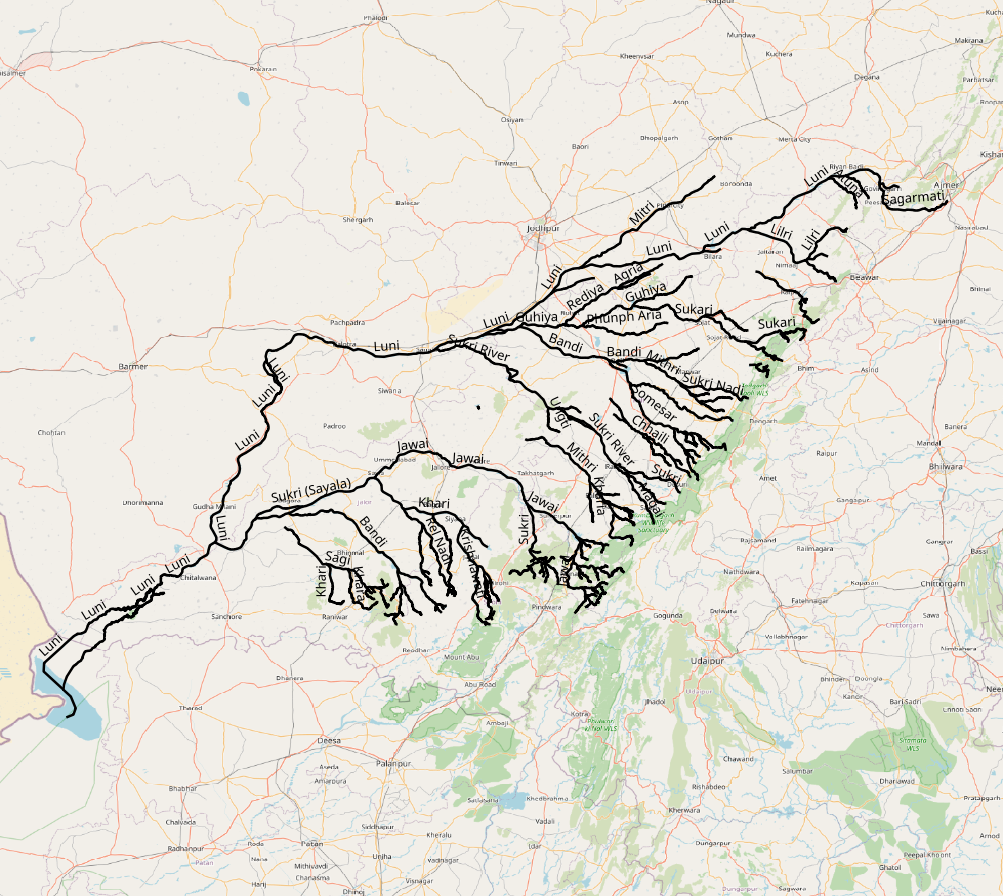
Luni River Basin

The Jawai, Sukri, Guhiya, Bandi and Jojari rivers are the main tributaries of Luni river. The Jojari is the only tributary that merges to the right bank of the river while other 10 tributaries join its left bank. All the tributaries except Jojari originate from the Aravalli Range.

== Dams and irrigation ==
The dams in Luni river are:

- Jaswant Sagar Dam - built in 1892 by Maharaja Jaswant Singh.It is one of the largest artificial lakes in India.

The two major irrigation projects on Luni river are SardarSamand and Jawai dam. Sardar Samand dam was constructed in 1905.

== Flash floods ==
Flash floods have occurred in the Luni river as the river flows on a shallow bed and the riverbank soil is easily flattened by the rain water.

The worst flood happened in 2006, when the desert region received heavy rain. Flash floods caused water levels to rise to as high as 15 to 25 feet (5 to 8 m) submerging many parts along the river in the Balotra

In 2010, another flood occurred but there were fewer casualties.

== Industrial Pollution Impact ==
The degradation of the Luni River's water quality is primarily attributed to the discharge of hazardous pollutants by textile industries located along its banks, including Balotra, Bithuja, Jasol, and Pali. The pollution has resulted in the loss of the river's natural flow, transforming freshwater into saline water as it reaches Balotra. This pollution not only affects the river itself but also contaminates groundwater and surface water bodies in the surrounding areas.

=== Efforts to Combat Pollution ===
Several individuals and organizations have been actively involved in combating the pollution of the Luni River. The 'Pradushan Niwaran and Paryavarn Sanrakshan Samiti,' a voluntary organization, has been at the forefront of the fight against river pollution. Their efforts include advocating for the enforcement of green norms, raising awareness about the issue, and pushing for compensation to farmers whose crops have been damaged due to contaminated water.

=== Legal Interventions ===
The National Green Tribunal (NGT) and the Rajasthan High Court have played significant roles in addressing the pollution problem of the Luni River. The NGT, in response to a public interest litigation, declared the Luni water unfit for irrigation due to pollution from textile dyeing units. The court ordered the shutdown of around 800 textile units for violating green norms, and subsequent assessments were conducted to monitor the situation.

=== Ongoing Challenges ===
Despite legal interventions and efforts by various stakeholders, challenges persist in addressing the pollution of the Luni River. Textile industries continue to discharge pollutants into the river, and encroachments in the catchment area exacerbate the problem. The lack of full compliance with environmental quality standards by some industries and the failure to achieve zero liquid discharge (ZLD) remain areas of concern. Due to the absence of embankments around the river bank, saline water reaches the nearby fields during the rainy season, causing a decrease in fertility.

== Fish diversity ==
The fish diversity assessment of Luni river led by ICAR-National Bureau of Fish Genetic Resources, Lucknow from October, 2018 - November, 2019 reported the occurrence of 27 species belonging to 22 genera, dominated by Cyprinids. The highest fish diversity of 12 species was reported in Samdhari and Gandhav. In this study, the wide distribution of Invasive Fish Species such as African Catfish (Clarias gariepinus) and Mozambique tilapia (Oreochromis mossambicus) were also reported from the river Luni.
