= Khari River =

Khari

Location
- Country: India
- State: Gujarat

Physical characteristics
- Source
  - location: India
- Mouth
  - location: Arabian Sea, India
- Length: 50 km (31 mi)
- Discharge
  - location: Arabian Sea

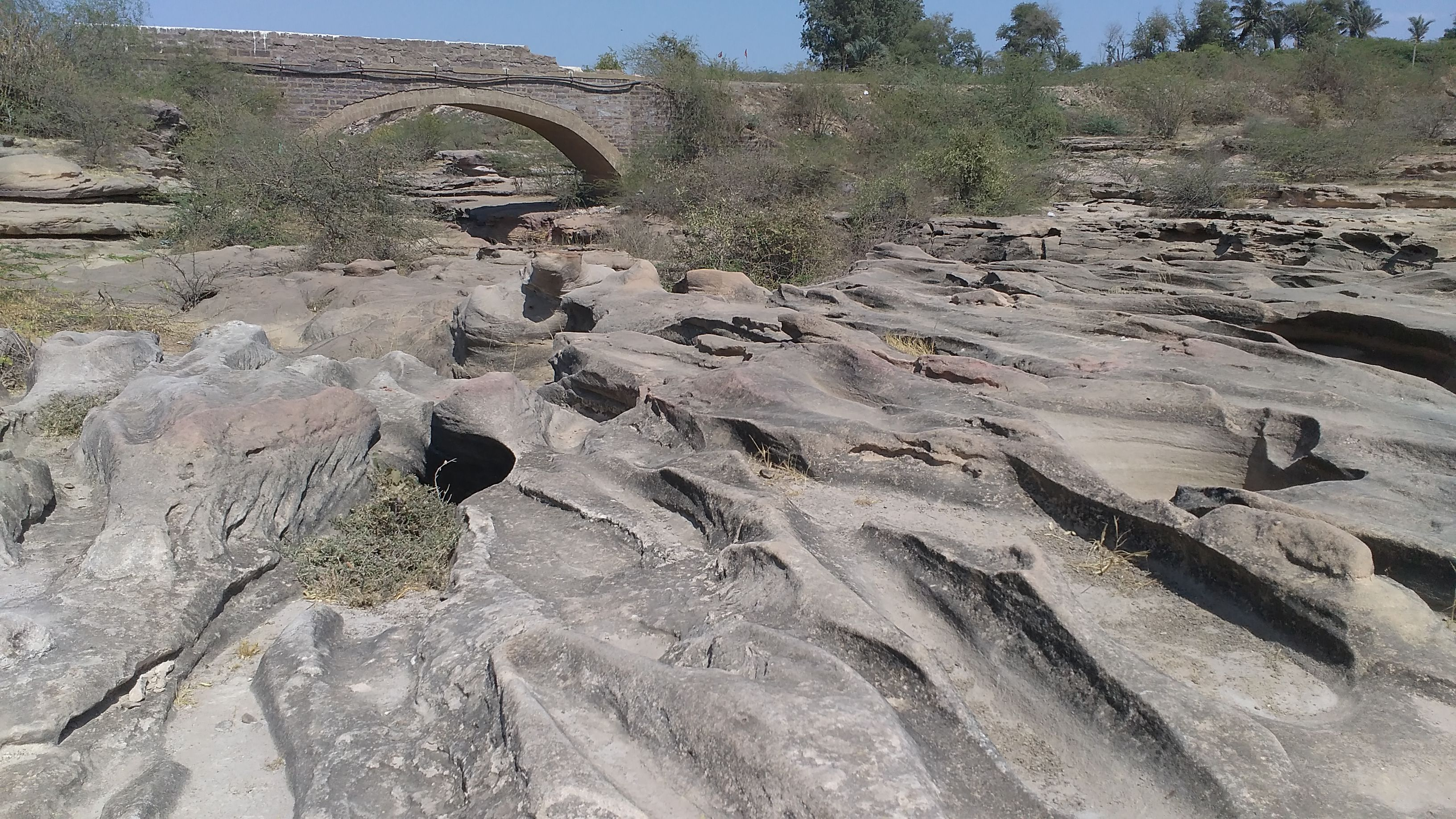
Bedrock of the Khari river

Khari River is a river in Western India. It is a tributary of the West Banas River, originating from the Aravalli hills in Sirohi district. It flows in a southwestern direction through Rajasthan and passes through Banaskantha and Mehsana districts in Gujarat before draining into the Little Rann of Kutch.
