= Outline of Gujarat =

State in western India

Location of Gujarat

The following outline is an overview of and topical guide to the state of Gujarat in Western India, sometimes called the "Jewel of Western India". It has an area of 196,024 km^{2} (75,685 sq mi) with a coastline of 1,600 km (990 mi), most of which lies on the Kathiawar peninsula, and a population in excess of 60 million. It is bordered by Rajasthan to the north, Maharashtra to the south, Madhya Pradesh to the east, and the Arabian Sea and the Pakistani province of Sindh to the west. Its capital city is Gandhinagar, and its largest city is Ahmedabad. Gujarat is home to the Gujarati-speaking people of India.

Seal of Gujarat

== General reference ==
=== Names ===
- Common English name(s): Gujarat
  - Pronunciation: /ˌɡʊdʒəˈrɑːt/ GUUJ-ə-RAHT, Gujarati: [ˈɡudʒəɾat̪]
- Official English name(s): State of Gujarat
- Nickname(s):
- Adjectival(s): Gujarati
- Demonym(s): Gujaratis
- Etymology: Name of Gujarat
- Gujarat-related topics
  - Gujarat-related topics

=== Rankings (amongst India's states) ===
- by population: 9th
- by area (2011 census): 6th
- by crime rate (2015): 14th
- by gross domestic product (GDP) (2020): 4th
- by Human Development Index (HDI):
- by life expectancy at birth:
- by literacy rate:

== Geography of Gujarat ==
Geography of Gujarat

- Gujarat is: an Indian state
- Location
  - Northern Hemisphere
  - Eastern Hemisphere
    - Eurasia
      - Asia
        - South Asia
          - India
            - Western India
  - Extreme points of Gujarat
- Demography of Gujarat:
- Area of Gujarat:
- Atlas of Gujarat
- Time zone: Indian Standard Time (UTC+05:30)

=== Environment of Gujarat ===
Environment of Gujarat

- Climate of Gujarat
- Protected areas of Gujarat
  - National parks and wildlife sanctuaries of Gujarat
- Wildlife of Gujarat
  - Fauna of Gujarat
    - Butterflies of Gujarat

==== Natural geographic features of Gujarat ====
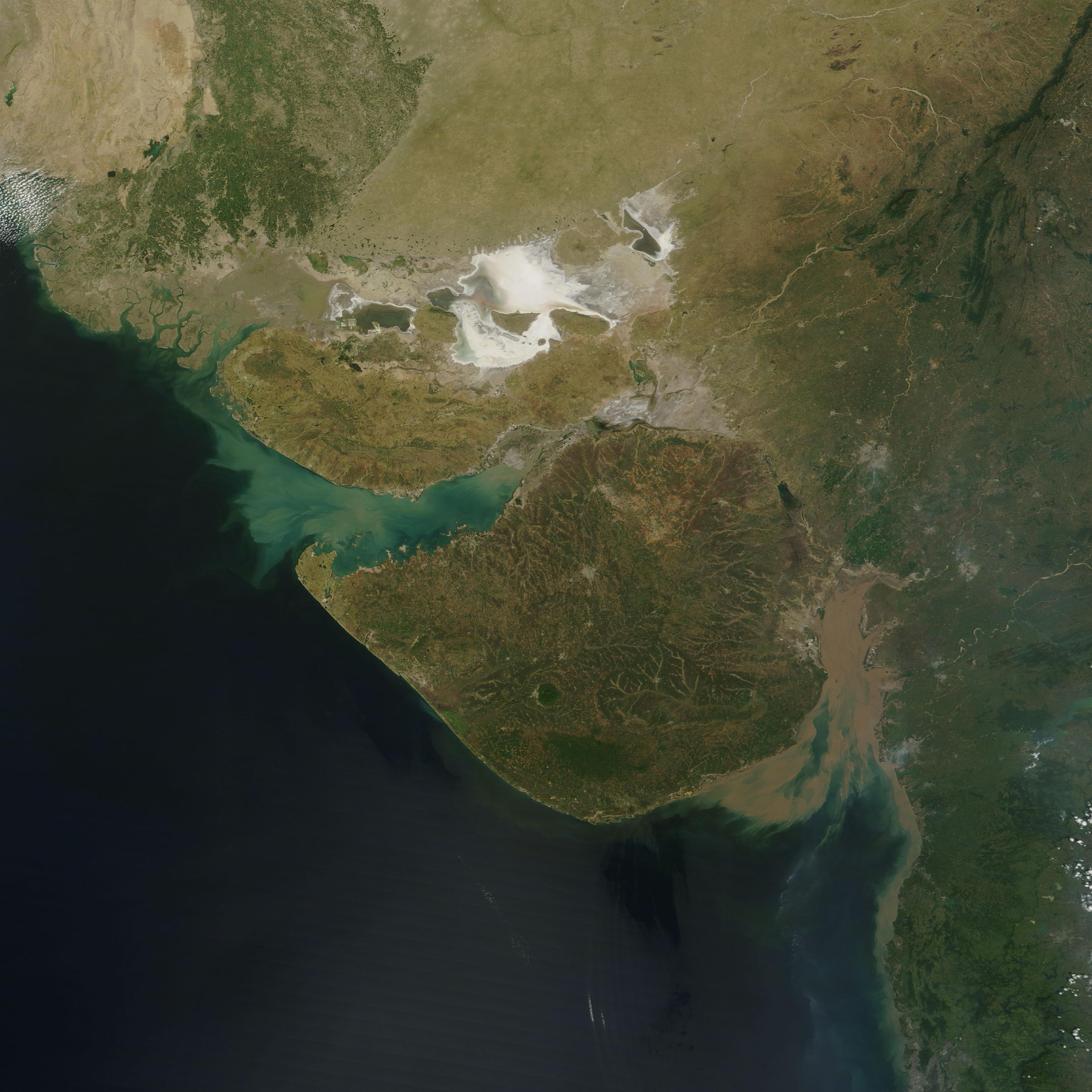
Satellite image of Gujarat

Landforms of Gujarat

- Bodies of water of Gujarat
  - Rivers of Gujarat
    - Narmada River
    - Sabarmati River
    - Tapti River
    - Aji River
    - Mahi River
    - River Ghela
    - Rukmavati River
    - Vishwamitri River
    - West Banas River
    - Daman Ganga River
  - Waterfalls of Gujarat
- Hills in Gujarat
  - Chotila
  - Pavagadh Hill
  - Palitana
  - Saputara
  - Girnar
- Mountain ranges in Gujarat
  - Vindhya
  - Satpura range
  - Aravali range

=== Administrative divisions of Gujarat ===
==== Districts of Gujarat ====
- Districts of Gujarat

==== Municipalities of Gujarat ====
Municipalities of Gujarat

- Capital of Gujarat: Capital of Gujarat
- Cities of Gujarat
  - Cities in Gujarat by population

=== Demography of Gujarat ===
Demographics of Gujarat

== Government and politics of Gujarat ==
Government of Gujarat

- Form of government: Indian state government (parliamentary system of representative democracy)
- Capital of Gujarat: Capital of Gujarat
- Elections in Gujarat
  - (specific elections)
- Political families of Gujarat

=== Union government in Gujarat ===
- Rajya Sabha members from Gujarat
- Gujarat Pradesh Congress Committee
- Indian general election, 2009 (Gujarat)
- Indian general election, 2014 (Gujarat)

=== Branches of the government of Gujarat ===
Government of Gujarat

==== Executive branch of the government of Gujarat ====
- Head of state: Governor of Gujarat,
- Head of government: Chief Minister of Gujarat,
- Council of Ministers of Gujarat
- Departments and agencies of Gujarat
  - Gujarat State Road Transport Corporation
  - Gujarat Industrial Development Corporation
  - Gujarat Pollution Control Board
  - Gujarat State Wide Area Network
  - Gujarat State Financial Corporation
  - Gujarat Mineral Development Corporation

==== Legislative branch of the government of Gujarat ====
Gujarat Legislative Assembly

- Constituencies of Gujarat Legislative Assembly
- Leader of Opposition in Gujarat Vidhansabha

==== Judicial branch of the government of Gujarat ====
- Gujarat High Court
  - Chief Justice of Gujarat

=== Law and order in Gujarat ===
Law of Gujarat

- Law enforcement in Gujarat
  - Gujarat Police
  - Gujarat Marine Police

== History of Gujarat ==
History of Gujarat

=== History of Gujarat, by period ===
==== Prehistoric Gujarat ====
- Lower Paleolithic
  - Middle Paleolithic
    - Upper Paleolithic

==== Ancient Gujarat ====
- Indus Valley Civilization
  - Harappan civilization
    - Dholavira
- Mauryan Empire
- Western Satraps
- Gupta Empire
- Maitraka
- Saindhava

==== Medieval Gujarat ====
- Gujarat Sultanate
- Rana Sanga's invasion of Gujarat

==== Colonial Gujarat ====
- Baroda, Western India and Gujarat States Agency
  - Saurashtra (state)
  - Kutch State
  - Bombay Presidency
    - Bombay State
      - Gujarat

=== History of Gujarat, by subject ===
- History of stepwells in Gujarat

== Culture of Gujarat ==
Culture of Gujarat

- Architecture of Gujarat
  - Forts in Gujarat
- Cuisine of Gujarat
- Languages of Gujarat
- Monuments in Gujarat
  - Monuments of National Importance in Gujarat
  - State Protected Monuments in Gujarat
- World Heritage Sites in Gujarat

=== Art in Gujarat ===
- Music of Gujarat

=== People of Gujarat ===
People of Gujarat

- Pathans of Gujarat
- People from Gujarat

=== Religion in Gujarat ===
Religion in Gujarat

- Christianity in Gujarat
- Hinduism in Gujarat

=== Sports in Gujarat ===
Sports in Gujarat

- Cricket in Gujarat
  - Gujarat Cricket Association
  - Gujarat cricket team
- Football in Gujarat
  - Gujarat State Football Association
- Gujarat Premier Hockey League

=== Symbols of Gujarat ===
Symbols of Gujarat

- State animal:lion
- State bird:Surkhab
- State flower:Marigold
- State seal: Seal of Gujarat
- State tree:Banayan

== Economy and infrastructure of Gujarat ==
Economy of Gujarat

- Communications of Gujarat
  - Newspapers in Gujarat
  - Gujarat Samachar
- Conglomerates in Gujarat
- Currency of Gujarat:
- Tourism in Gujarat
- Transportation in Gujarat
  - List of state highways in Gujarat

== Education in Gujarat ==
Education in Gujarat

- Gujarat Secondary and Higher Secondary Education Board
- Institutions of higher education in Gujarat
  - Central University of Gujarat
  - Gujarat University
  - Gujarat Technological University

== Health in Gujarat ==
Health in Gujarat

== See also ==
- Outline of India
