= Sardar Patel Planetarium =

Planetarium in Vadodara, Gujarat, India

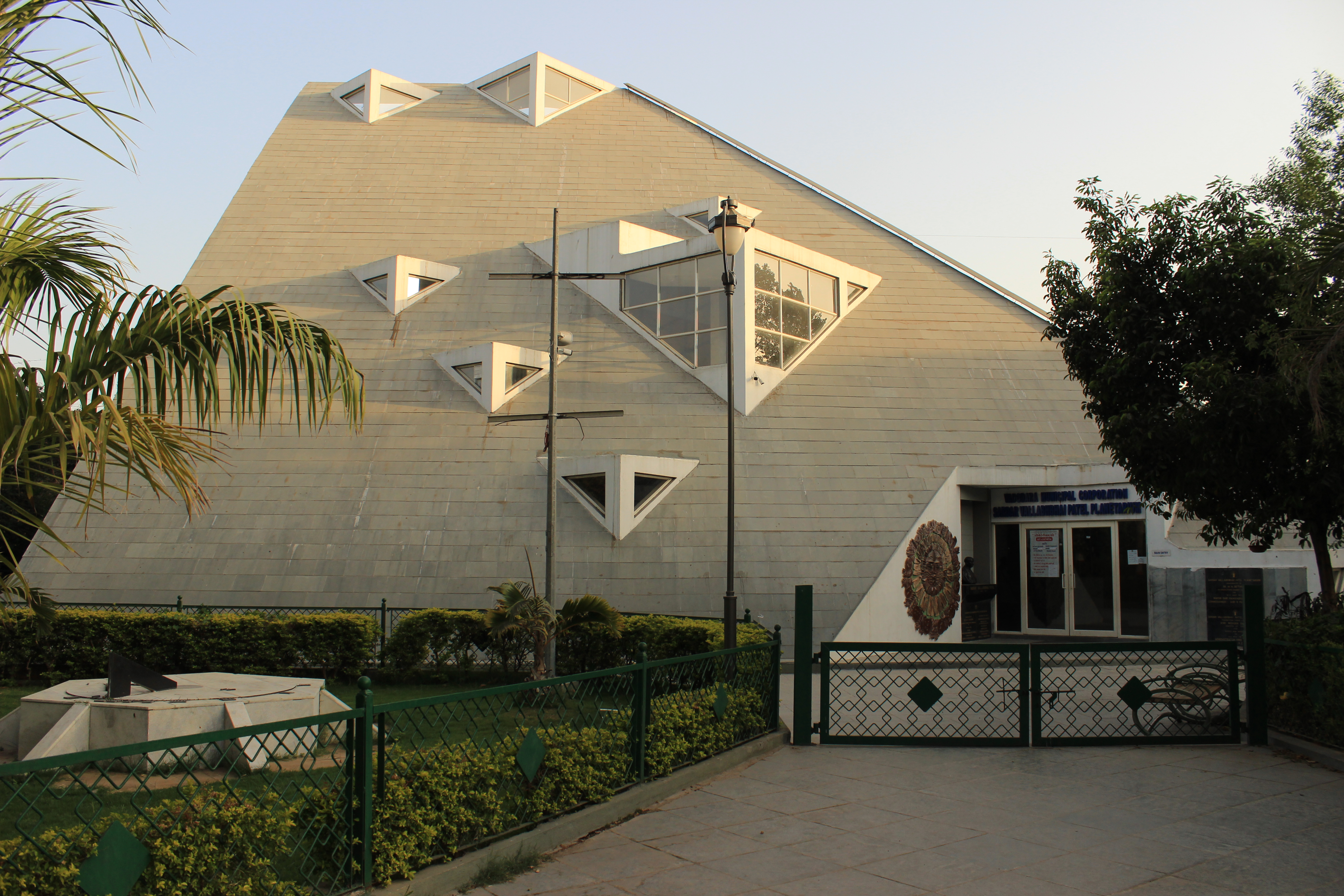
- Pyramid-shaped building of the planetarium
- Established: 12 July 1976; 49 years ago
- Location: Sayajibaug, Vadodara, Gujarat, India
- Coordinates: 22.3094°N 73.1894°E
- Type: Planetarium
- Architects: P. S. Ranjan, Panna Ranjan
- Owner: Vadodara Municipal Corporation

Sardar Patel Planetarium (Note: The official name is Sardar Vallabhbhai Patel Planetarium.) is a planetarium in Sayajibaug, Vadodara, Gujarat, India which was inaugurated in 1976. The pyramid-like building has four floors housing an amphitheatre, a planetarium chamber, an exhibition space and an observatory.

== History ==
The planetarium was built by Vadodara Municipal Corporation near the main gate and in a corner of Sayajibaug, a central garden on the banks of Vishwamitri river.

The foundation of the planetarium was laid on 3 November 1974 by Mohan Dharia, Minister of State for Works and Housing, Government of India. It was inaugurated on 12 July 1976 by H. N. Sethna, Chairman of the Atomic Energy Commission. It was named after Indian independence activist Sardar Vallabhbhai Patel to commemorate his birth centenary. Over the years, the building had deteriorated so it was renovated at a cost of ₹6.03 crore (US$630,000) and was reopened to public on 24 October 2017.

== Architecture and features ==
The planetarium was designed by P. S. Ranjan and Panna Ranjan while V. M. Shah was a structural designer. The design avoided the dominant feature of the dome as in the most planetariums. The concept was to design a form that evokes one to look up the sky thus they designed the building with slopes.

It is a multi-functional pyramid-like building with four floors. On the ground floor, there is an entrance, an entrance hall, an office space and an open-air amphitheatre with seating capacity of 300 people. The mezzanine floor overlooking it provides space intended for cafeteria and reading room. The third floor has the planetarium chamber with 12.5 metres (41 ft) wide dome and a Zeiss Spacemaster projector. It has a seating capacity of 156 to 200 people. The large foyer of the planetarium chamber serves as an exhibition space. Following renovation in 2017, new astronomical models were installed. The shows are conducted daily in Gujarati, Hindi and English languages. The whole structure is topped by an observatory on the fourth floor.

The building's structure utilizes an reinforced concrete frame with a diagonal grid layout. This allows for diagonal support members for the sloping exterior sides on north and west. The triangular openings along these slopes are created by extending the columns outwards. The floors inside the building are suspended within the large volume created by the sloping roof. The sense of continuity throughout the space is created by a visually connected staircase leading to all floors. The exterior is clad with Kota stone.

The building is surrounded by the Science Park spread over an area of 2,500 square metres (27,000 sq ft) which has 15 exhibits related to astronomy and physics. It was established in collaboration with the National Council of Science Museums.

== Gallery ==
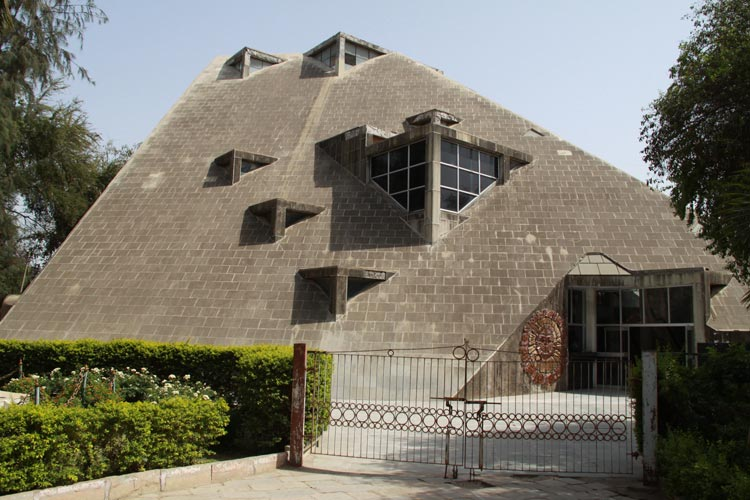
Building before renovation

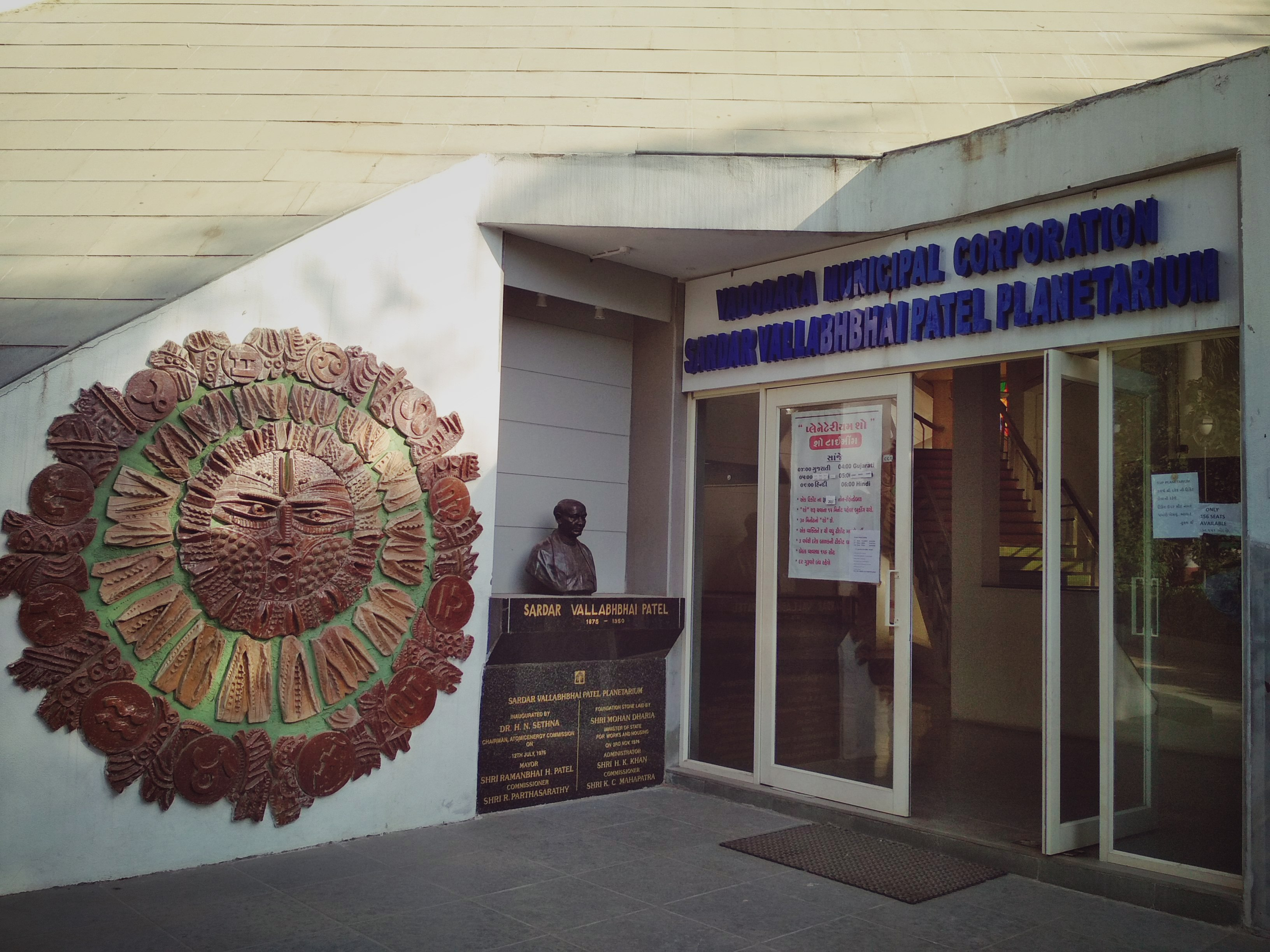
Entrance

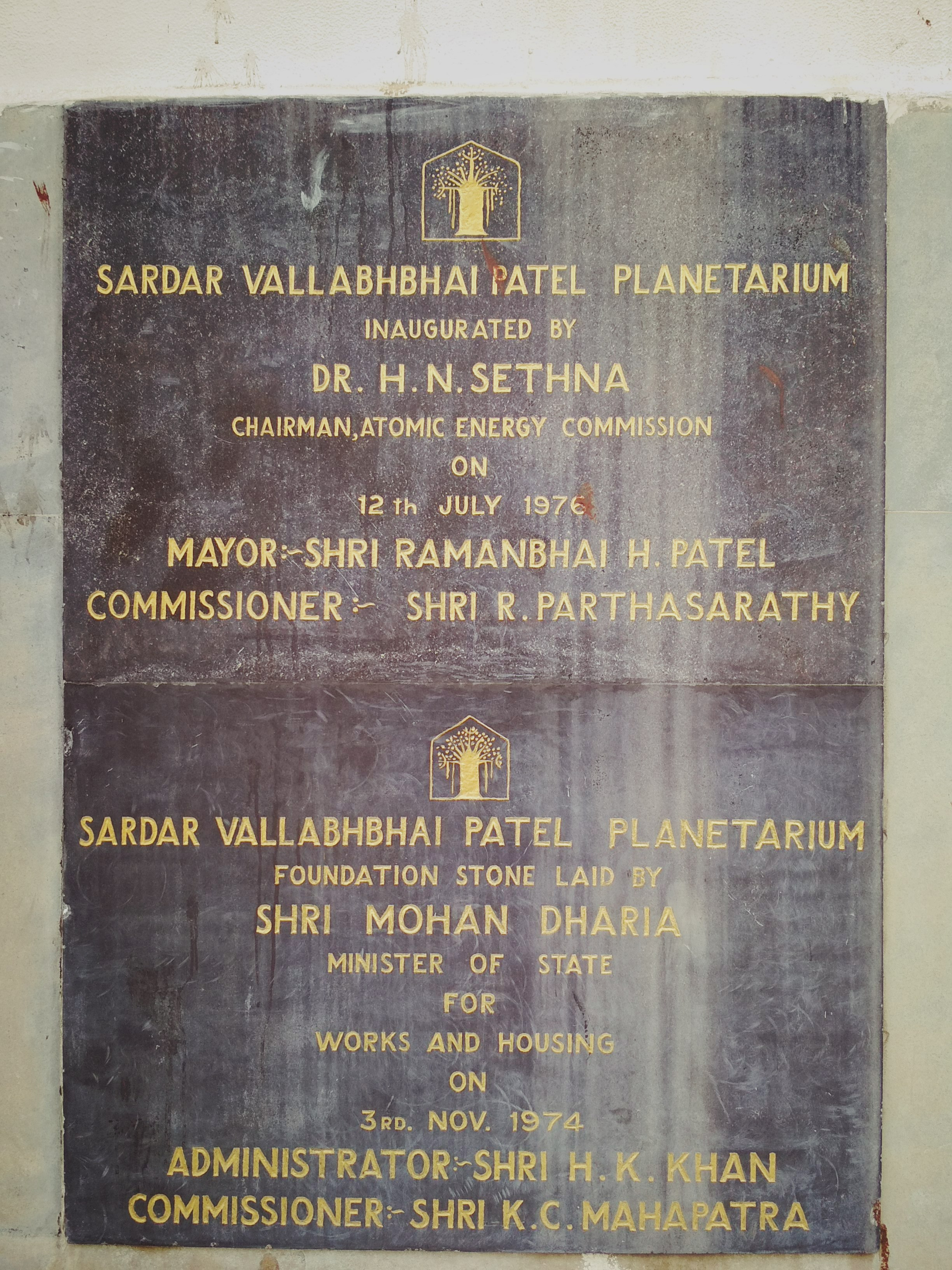
Inauguration plaque

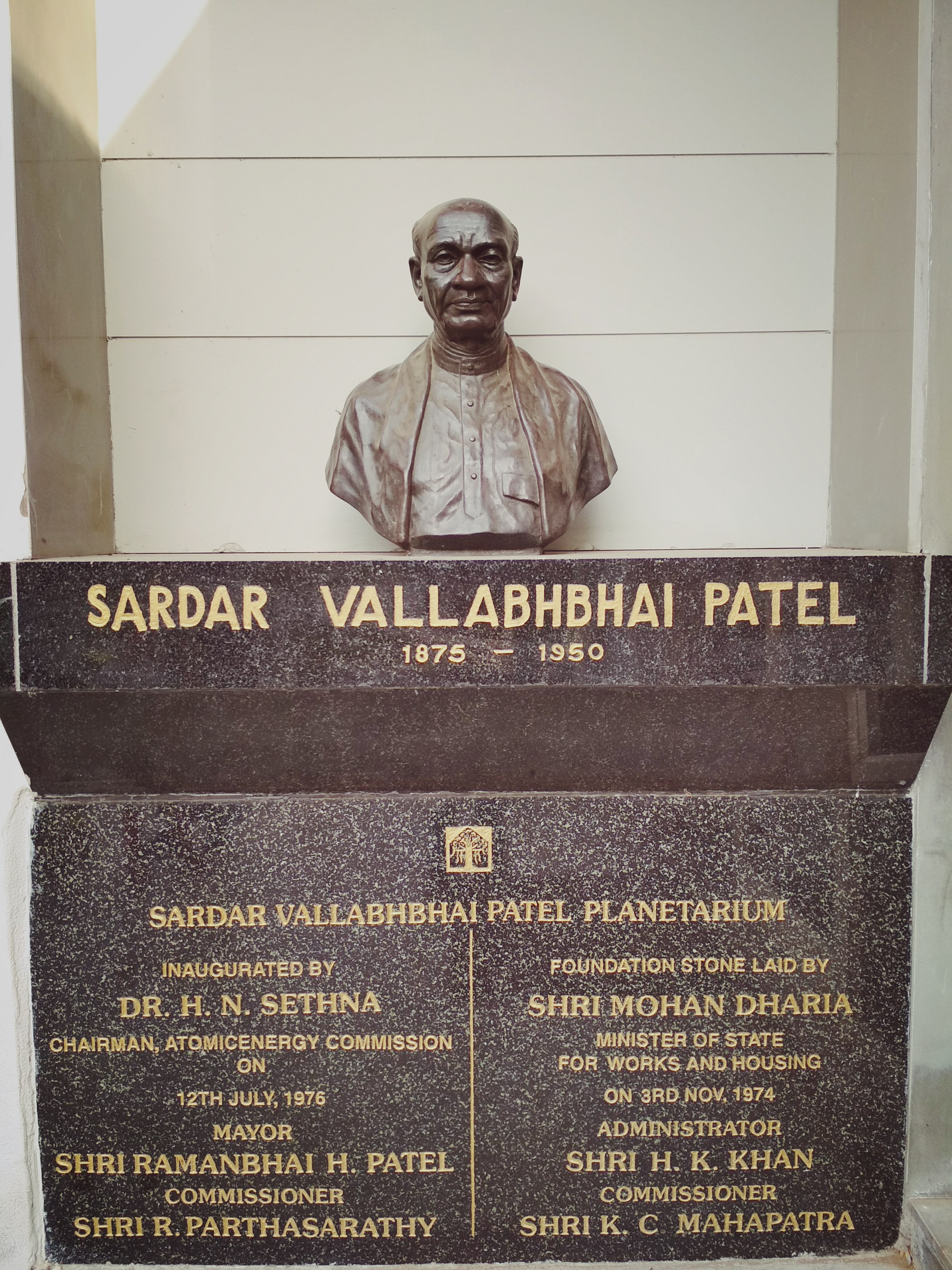
Bust of Sardar Patel

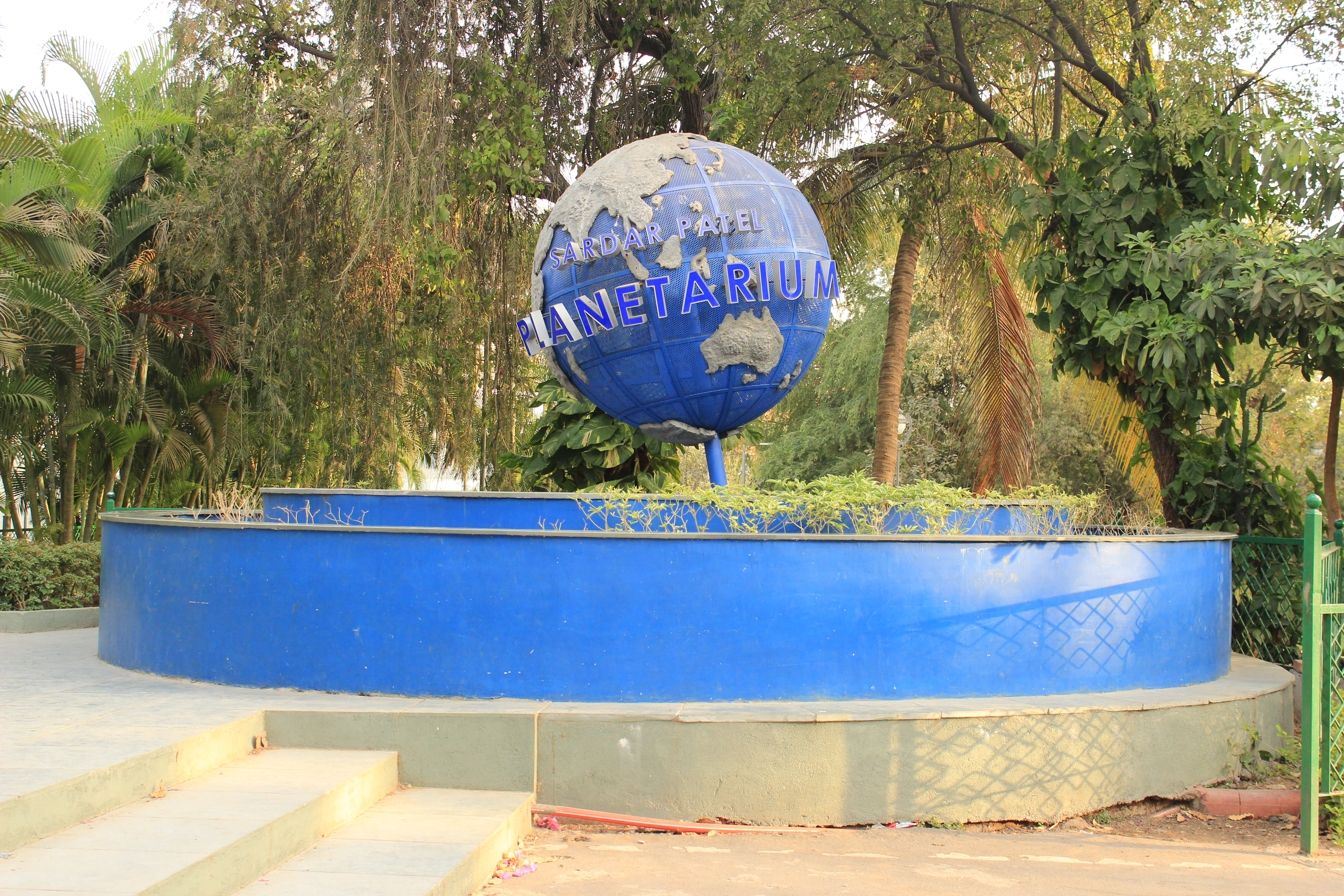
Earth model in park

== See also ==
- List of Planetariums
