= Mandvi (disambiguation) =

Mandvi is a town in the Kachchh district of Gujarat, India.

Mandvi may also refer to:

- Mandvi, Kachchh (Vidhan Sabha constituency), a Gujarat assembly constituency in Kachchh district
- Mandvi, Surat (Vidhan Sabha constituency), a constituency in Surat district
- Mandvi, Mumbai, location in South Mumbai
- Aasif Mandvi, Indian-born British-American actor
- Ahmedpur Mandvi Beach, beach in Gujarat, India

== See also ==
- Mandavi, character in the Indian epic Ramayana
- Mandavi (surname), Indian surname
- Mandavya, sage in Hinduism
- Mandavyapura or Mandore, town in Rajasthan, India
