= Geography of Gujarat =

Gujarat is a state located in Western India. Its north-western border, which is also the international border, is adjacent to Pakistan. It borders Rajasthan and Madhya Pradesh to the north and east, respectively. Maharashtra is to its south-east. The Arabian Sea forms its western-southern boundary. Dadra, Daman, and Nagar Haveli are on its southern border.

The capital of the state is Gandhinagar. Gandhinagar is located near Ahmedabad, the state's major commercial center. The area of Gujarat is 196,024 km (121,804 mi).

It has the longest coastline of any Indian state, at 1,214 km (754 mi), and also has one of the largest salt deserts in the world, covering 7,500 km^{2} (2,900 sq mi).

The geography of Gujarat state of India includes following:

Physical map of Gujarat

== Mountain ranges ==
- Vindhya
- Western Ghats
- Satpura range
- Tripura hills

== Hills ==
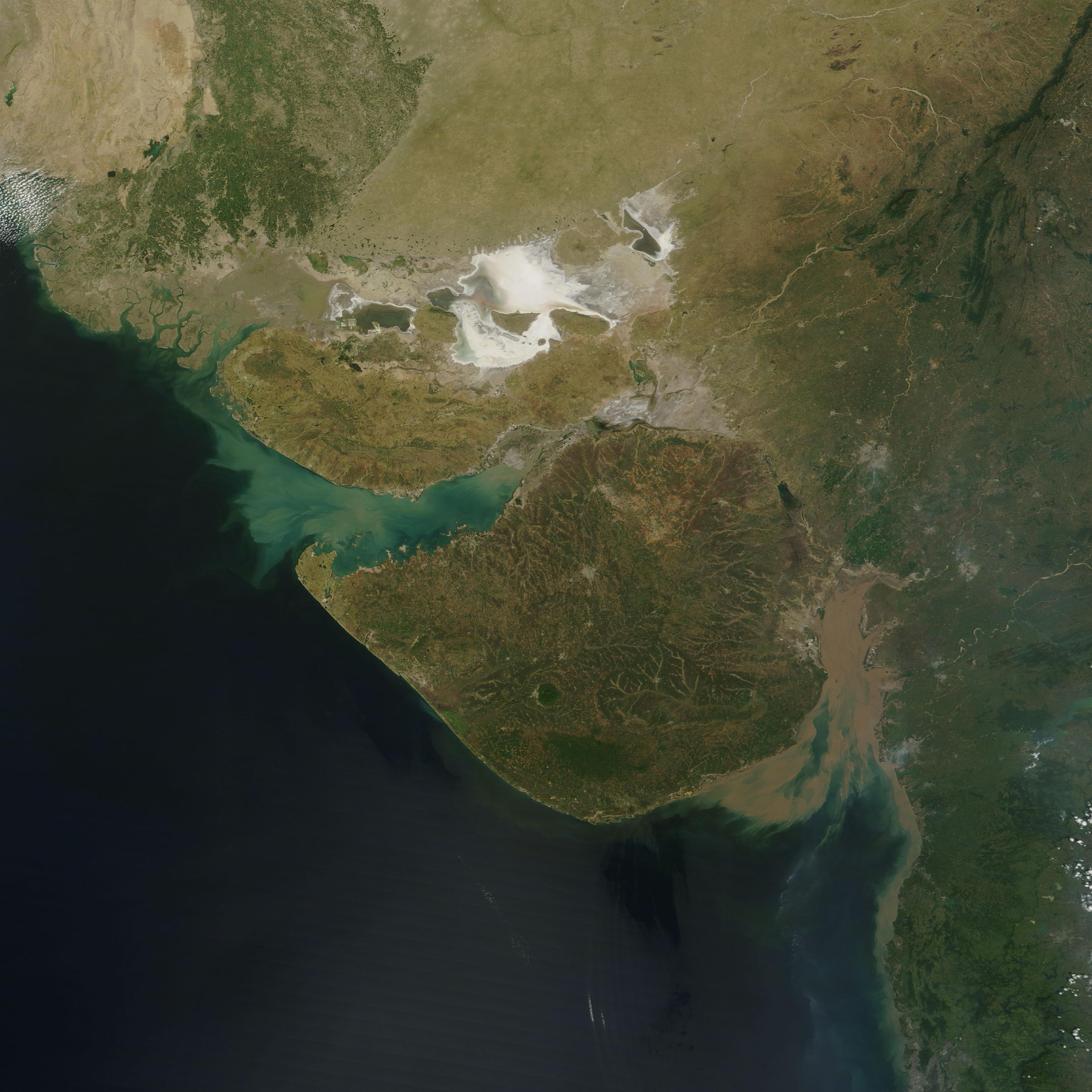
Satellite image of Gujarat

- Chotila
- Pavagadh
- Palitana
- Saputara
- Girnar
- Bardo
- Gabbar

== Rivers ==
- Narmada
- Tapi
- Mahi
- Sabarmati
- West Banas
- Shetrunji
- Bhadar
- Aji
- Ghela
- Rukmavati
- Vishwamitri
- Damanganga

== Ecoregions ==
According to the WWF, Gujarat covers portions of five terrestrial ecoregions:

- The Indus River Delta–Arabian Sea mangroves are found in tidal areas bordering the Gulf of Kutch and Gulf of Khambat, as well as in the Indus River Delta of neighboring Sind province of Pakistan.

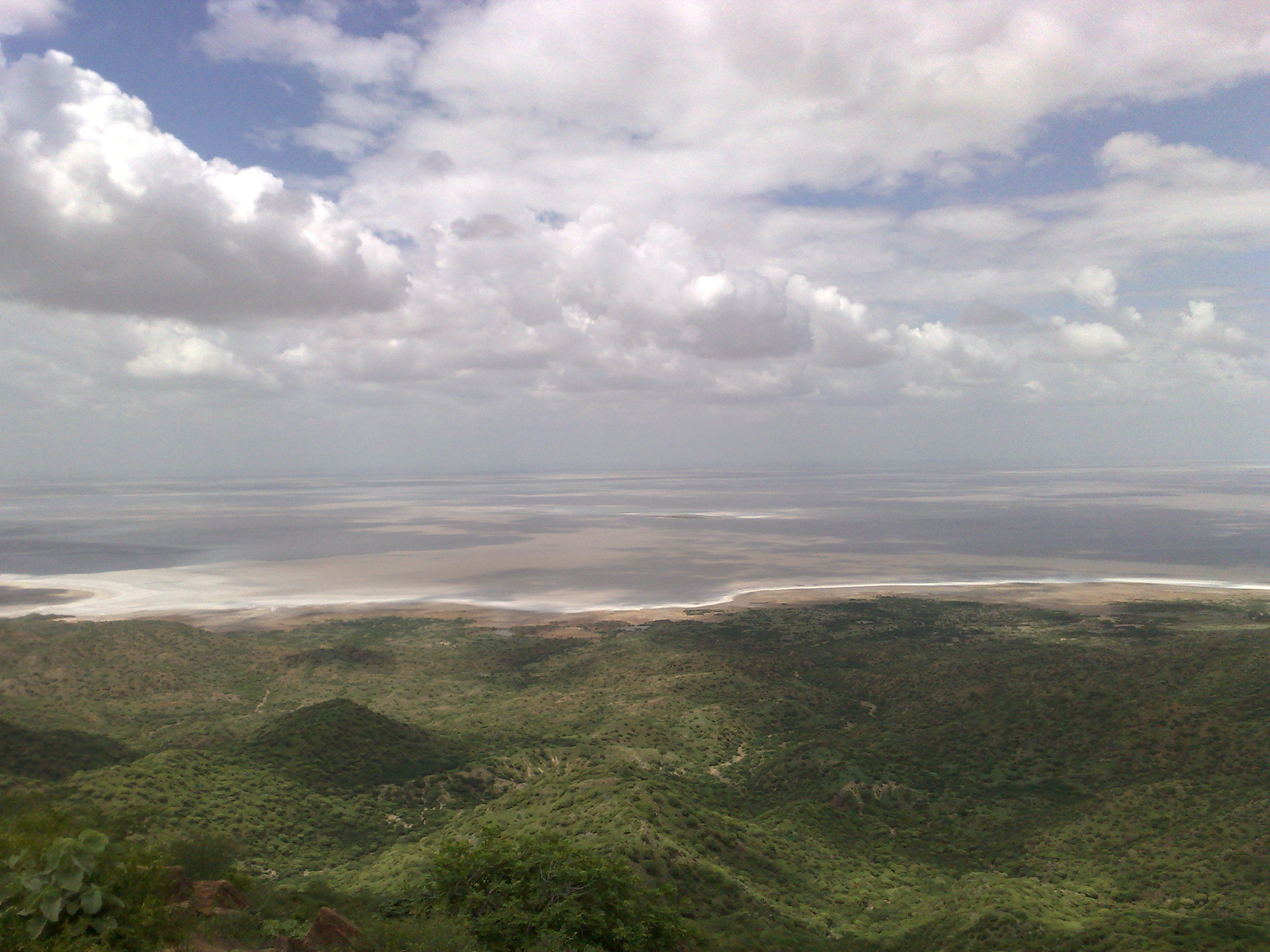
Rann of Kutch

- Khathiar–Gir dry deciduous forests cover the eastern portion of the state, extending into adjacent portions of Rajasthan and Madhya Pradesh, with a pocket on the peak of Girnar in the central Kathiawar. The natural vegetation is a dry deciduous forest with trees up to 25 meters tall and areas of thorn scrub. The vegetation has been much altered by centuries of intensive agriculture and grazing.
- The North Western Ghats moist deciduous forests cover the Western Ghats range in the extreme southeastern portion of Gujarat. The natural vegetation is diverse, multistoried rainforests with trees up to 45 meters tall, along with understory herbs, shrubs, lianas, and epiphytes.
- Northwestern thorn scrub forests cover the Kathiawar Peninsula and the upland portion of Kutch District, extending north into Rajasthan. The natural vegetation is open thorn scrub.
- The Rann of Kutch is a large seasonal salt marsh in the northwestern portion of Gujarat.

== Beaches ==
Umbharat Beach - Jalalpore Ubharat Beach is situated on the coastline of the state of Gujarat and is one of the finest beaches of India in Navsari District of Gujarat. It comes into Jalalpore Taluka. It is located on the coast of the Gulf of Khambhat, the Arabian Sea of the Indian Ocean, at a distance of 34 km (21 mi) from Jalalpore and 33 km (21 mi) from Navsari City, in Navsari District. It is 40 km (25 mi) away from the city of Surat.

Dandi Beach - Jalalpore Dandi Beach is situated on the coastline of the state of Gujarat and is one of the finest beaches of India in Navsari District of Gujarat. It comes into Jalalpore Taluka. It is located on the coast of the Gulf of Khambhat, the Arabian Sea of the Indian Ocean, 15 km (9.3 mi) from Jalalpore, and 31 km (19 mi) and 22 km (14 mi) from Bilimora and Navsari City, respectively, in Navsari District. It is 49 km (30 mi) away from the city of Surat.

Ahmedpur Mandvi Beach - Ahmedpur Mandvi Beach is situated on the coastline of the state of Gujarat and is one of the finest beaches in India. It is in Ahmedpur Mandvi, close to Diu.

Mandvi Beach - Kutch - Mandvi Wind Farms Beach and windmills, which line the horizon of Mandvi, offer views from the Mandvi sea beach. The Windmill projects on this beach were Asia's first in 1983.

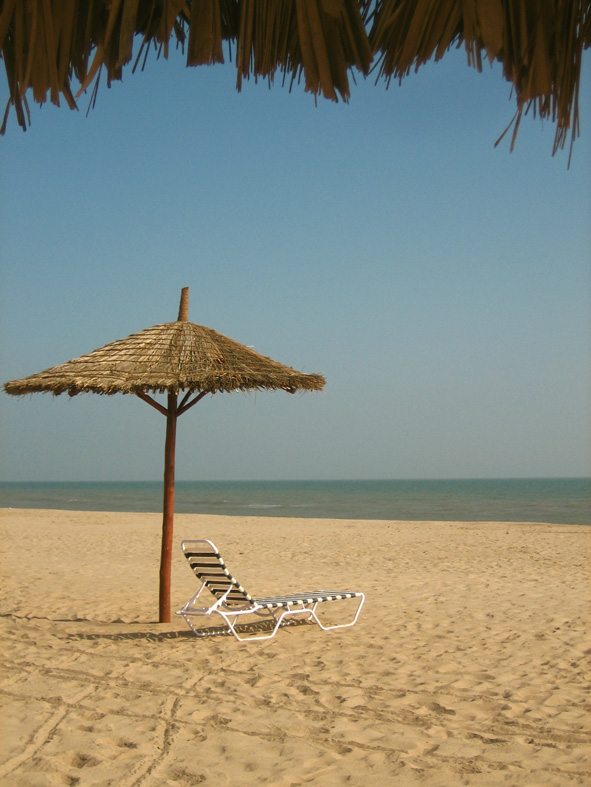
Mandvi Beach, Kutch

Chorwad Beach - Chorwad Beach of Gujarat is another beach situated on the west coast of India. It is 66 km (41 mi) from Junagadh. Chorwad has a high potential to attract both domestic and international tourists. The beach consists of rocky hills and presents an opportunity for boat rides.

Diu Beach - Diu beach is situated on the island of Diu, off the Saurashtra coast. Diu has a small population and is connected to the mainland of Gujarat via a causeway.

Gopnath Beach - Gopnath Beach is situated in the Bhavnagar district of Gujarat. It comes into Talaja Taluka. It is located on the coast of the Gulf of Kambhat, 75 km (47 mi) from the city of Bhavnagar. and 22 km (14 mi)away from Talaja. The Fort of the King of Gohilvad is situated in Gopnath.

Kutch Mandvi Beach — Kutch Mandvi is an important beach in Gujarat, situated at Mandvi. Mandvi is the historic port town of the Maharao of Kutch, located 75 km (47 mi) from Bhuj. Kutch Mandvi was once the residence of the Maharao of Kutch and an important seaport.

Umbergam Beach - Umargam is about 6 km (3.7 mi) from Umargam Road railway station on Mumbai-Surat rail section. This region was a part of the Thane district before the creation of Gujarat in 1960.

Umargam is situated on the southern bank of Nargol Creek. It was a small village about two centuries ago, serving as a transit point for the export of marine produce from the fishing port of Nargol on the Northern Bank of the creek.

Madhavpur Beach - Madhavpur Ghed Beach is on Porbandar-Veraval Highway and is located in Porbandar.
