= Sardar Vallabhbhai Patel Sports Enclave =

Sports complex in Gujarat, India

Ahmedabad Sports Enclave
- Interactive map of Ahmedabad Sports Enclave
- Full name: Sardar Vallabhbhai Patel Sports Enclave
- Address: Ahmedabad; India
- Location: Motera, Ahmedabad, Gujarat, India
- Coordinates: 23.091097°N 72.599193°E
- Owner: Government of Gujarat
- Operator: Ahmedabad Urban Development Authority
- Main venue: Narendra Modi Stadium; Capacity: 132,000
- Acreage: 236 acres (96 ha)

Construction
- Groundbreaking: 24 February 2021
- Cost: ₹4,600 crore (US$590 million)
- Architects: BPD; Collage Design; Cox Architecture

Sardar Vallabhbhai Patel Sports Enclave is an under-construction sports enclave being built in Ahmedabad, Gujarat, India, named after Sardar Vallabhbhai Patel. Once the sports enclave is fully built, it will be one of the largest of its kind in India. The project is being jointly executed with the Ahmedabad Urban Development Authority, and the Government of Gujarat. A primary reason for the sports enclave to be built, is to host major sporting events in India in the future, including the 2030 Commonwealth Games.

== History ==
The sports enclave is being constructed in Motera, which is a neighbourhood in the northwestern part of Ahmedabad. The Narendra Modi Stadium which is the world's largest stadium, and the largest cricket stadium, will also be located within the Sardar Vallabhbhai Patel Sports Enclave. The bhumi pujan ceremony was performed by the president of India Ram Nath Kovind on 24 February 2021. Many other political dignitaries were present at the event including the home minister of India, Amit Shah, and sports minister of India, Kiren Rijiju. The entire project is expected to cost ₹4,600 crores (US$590 million). The government will be investing ₹3,200 crore (US$450 million) into the project and private players will invest ₹1,400 crore (US$200 million). Along with this sports enclave another sports enclave will be built in Narayanpura. Once both enclaves are complete, all types of sports infrastructure will be present in Ahemdabad, and it will allow the city to host large-scale sporting events as well. The sports enclaves will have a capacity to accommodate up to 3,000 and up to 250 coaches as well. In the future, the Ahmedabad Bus Rapid Transit System, and Ahmedabad Metro will also be extended to the sports enclaves, so that transportation to and from the enclave will be made easier.

On 5 March 2025, it was announced that construction of the sports enclave would start in 2026. Alastair Richardson, director at Cox Architecture, revealed some of the plans for the venues during the Australia-India Sports Excellence Forum. The sports enclave will have an urban park described as "the Central Park of the city" strategically designed as a ‘heat sink', incorporating trees, green spaces and cool pavements to mitigate the state of Gujarat's climate. He also said that the Ahmedabad Urban Development Authority would seek out public–private partnerships to support the development.

== Features ==
The entire enclave will feature a large number of new venues. Of the new venues to be built most of the venues will be built from scratch. Along with sporting facilities, other buildings such as hotels, commercial areas, and a residential village for athletes will be built as well. The following venues will be built in the Sardar Vallabhbhai Patel Sports Enclave:

List of sporting venues
Name	Sport	Capacity	Size	Completion date
Narendra Modi Stadium	Cricket	132,000	22,600 square metres (243,000 sq ft)	2017 (expansion) 1983 (former structure)
Indoor Arena	Indoor sports	18,000	TBD	TBD
Aquatics Centre	Aquatic sports	12,000	11,000 square metres (120,000 sq ft)	TBD
Tennis Stadium	Tennis	10,000; 5,000; 3,000	TBD	TBD
Athletes' Village		3,000	TBD	TBD

== Part of 2036 Summer Olympics Bid ==
Once the Sardar Vallabhbhai Patel Sports Enclave is complete the Olympics could also be hosted in Ahmedabad in the future. In June 2021, the Ahmedabad Urban Development Authority invited proposals consultants to assess venues and related infrastructure that would be needed to host the Summer Olympic Games. This move came after the Narendra Modi Stadium was inaugurated and the Sardar Vallabhbhai Patel Sports Enclave was announced to be built. Reports have also suggested that the sports enclave will be a part of a future bid for the 2036 Summer Olympics from Ahmedabad.
