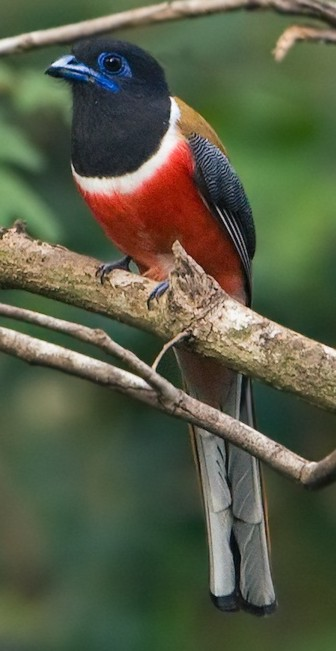
- Male H. f. malabaricus

Conservation status
- Least Concern (IUCN 3.1)

Scientific classification
- Kingdom: Animalia
- Phylum: Chordata
- Class: Aves
- Order: Trogoniformes
- Family: Trogonidae
- Genus: Harpactes
- Species: H. fasciatus

Binomial name
- Harpactes fasciatus (Pennant, 1769)
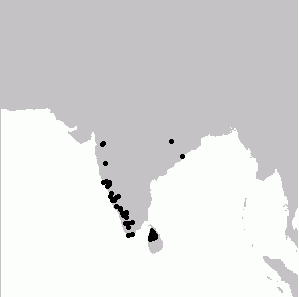

Synonyms
- Harpactes malabaricus

= Malabar trogon =

Species of bird

The Malabar trogon (Harpactes fasciatus) is a species of bird in the trogon family. It is found in the forests of India and Sri Lanka. In India, it is mainly found in the Western Ghats, hill forests of central India and in parts of the Eastern Ghats. They are insectivorous and although not migratory, may move seasonally in response to rain in hill forest regions. Like in other trogons, males and females vary in plumage. The birds utter low, guttural calls that can be heard only at close quarters, and perch still on a branch under the forest canopy, often facing away from the viewer, making them easy to miss despite their colourful plumage.

== Description ==
malabar trogon

Like most other trogons, these birds are brightly coloured and sexually dimorphic. The male has a slaty-black head and breast, with a white border on the black bib separating it from the crimson on the underside. The back is olive-brown to chestnut. The wing coverts are black with fine white vermiculations. They have 12 tail feathers that are graduated. The central tail-feathers are chestnut with a black tip, with the second and third pairs from the middle having more black than chestnut. The outer three pairs have long white tips. The female lacks the contrasting black and crimson, and has only a slightly darker head and breast that shades into the olive-brown on the back, while the crimson of the underside of the male is replaced by ochre.

In both sexes, the beak is bluish, as is the skin around the eye. The iris is dark brown and the feet are pale blue. The nostrils are covered by tufts of filoplumes. The feet are heterodactyl, a feature unique to the trogons, with the digits I and II facing back and digits III and IV pointing forward. In most birds, I, II, and III face forward, while IV faces back. In zygodactyly, II and III face forward, while I and IV face backwards.

Several populations have been named. The central Indian subspecies legerli, named by Walter Norman Koelz based on a single specimen obtained from the foot of Mahendragiri in Orissa is not always recognised, but said to be slightly larger, longer winged and brighter than malabaricus of the Western Ghats. The nominate race found in the central wet zone of Sri Lanka is smaller and the upperparts are brighter.

== Behaviour and ecology ==
These birds usually perch still, especially when alarmed and will sometimes clinging laterally to branches. When calling they sometimes raise and lower their tail. The call is a series of guttural or purring notes. The song of the male is a series of percussive kyau calls. The breeding season in India is mainly February to May (before the Monsoons), while it is March to June in Sri Lanka.

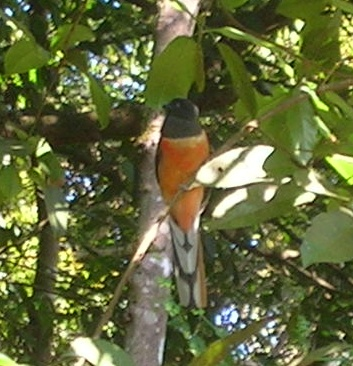
An immature male with scaly orange underparts

When they sit still, they appear hunched. The Hindi name used by hunters is kafni churi and refers to the hunched neckless appearance as if dressed in a fakir's kafni (robe). The Marathi name is karna while it is called kakarne hakki in Kannada. In Kerala it is known as theekakka (literally "fire-crow"). In Sri Lanka, it is known as loha wannichcha in the Sinhala language.

Malabar trogons feed exclusively on insects and fruits have not been noted in their diet, unlike in the New World trogons. Seeds have however been reported in the diet of Sri Lankan specimens. In the forests of Sri Lanka, they are often found in mixed-species foraging flocks where they may sometimes be subject to kleptoparasitism by drongos. A study in Kerala found that they foraged mainly at 5 to 10 m with females tending to forage lower within the canopy. When foraging on bark, they propped themselves using their tail like woodpeckers, especially on decaying tree stumps. They sometimes descend to the ground and search for insects under leaf litter. They will sometimes fly and try to flush prey and then hover to pick up prey. They may also hang upside down to reach prey on vertical tree surfaces. Prey are often mashed or struck on a branch between the mandibles before feeding on them or prior to feeding young. The contact call is a series of about five low-intensity que, while these were of higher intensity in territorial fights. The alarm call is a churrrr and a similar call is also delivered prior to roosting. Although their flight is fast, they are reluctant to fly. In the Nilgiri hills, they are altitudinal migrants and are found in the higher reaches only during summer.

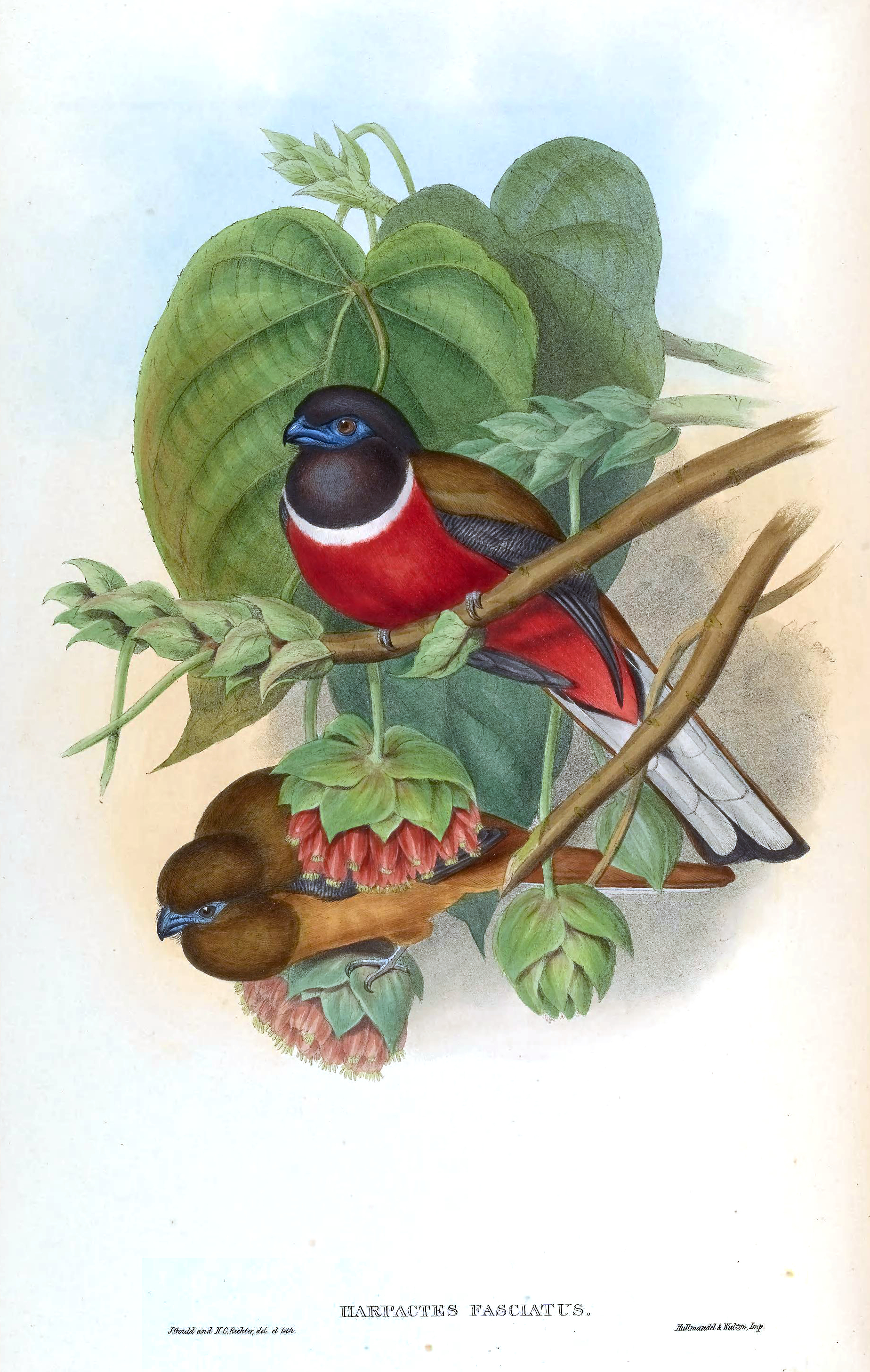
Illustration by John Gould (1854)

The nest is made in rotting trees or stumps that are easy to carve and pulverise using their bills. The male and female take turns to excavate the nest using their bills. It may take about a month to excavate the nest. The floor is made out of wood powder and no extra lining is added. Two eggs were seen to be the normal clutch in a study in Kerala although older works suggest that the typical clutch is of three eggs. The eggs are laid with a gap of two days, and incubated by both males and females with the females usually incubating at night. The incubation period is about 19 days. The hatchlings are fed mainly caterpillars for the initial period and later provided bugs, flies and orthopterans. The parents do not remove the excreta of the nestlings from the nest. The adults continue to feed the fledged juveniles for nearly 5 to 6 months. They are socially monogamous with pair bonds lasting more than a season.

Sri Lankan birds have been seen to plunge into water from an overhanging branch to bathe.

A species of endoparasitic cestode, Triaenorhina burti, has been described from the species.

== Status ==
The species is becoming rarer in many parts of India, and it is thought to be sensitive to forest fragmentation. Ornithologist Salim Ali noted it as being common in some areas of the Surat Dangs, where it is now rare. One of his records is from Ajwa in Vadodara district, which is believed to be a typographical error for Ahwa further south. Tickell collected specimens from Dampara in Dholbhum.

== Other sources ==
- Inglis, CM (1944) The nesting of the Malabar Trogon. Jour. Bengal Nat. Hist. Soc. 18:101.
