= Nimeta =

- town
- Location in Gujarat, India Nimeta (India)
- Coordinates: 22°21′9.85″N 73°18′11.31″E
- Country: India
- State: Gujarat

Languages
  - Official: Gujarati, Hindi
- Time zone: UTC+5:30 (IST)
- Vehicle registration: GJ
- Website: gujaratindia.com

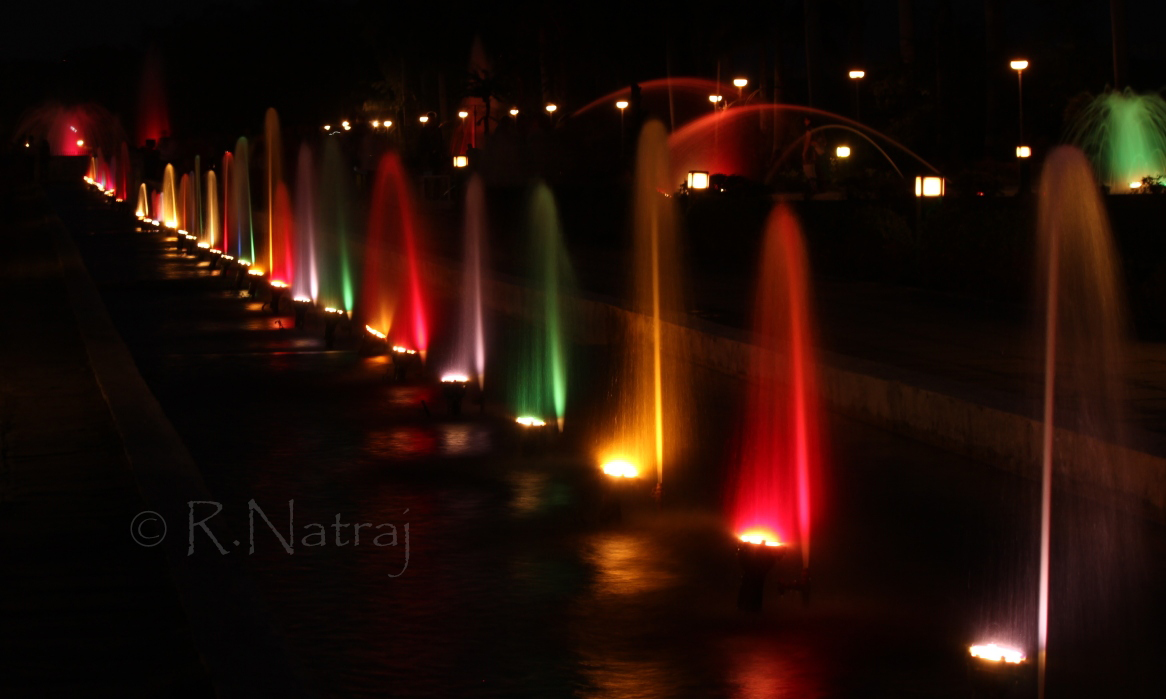
Water Fountain at Ajwa Nimeta Gardens

The village of Nimeta is located 15 km near the city of Baroda, India. The name Nimeta is always used with Ajwa; the entire region is commonly referred to as Ajwa Nimeta.

Nimeta has a water treatment plant. Its gardens make the town a popular tourist place.
