= Mandavi (surname) =

Mandavi (also Madavi or Maravi) is an Indian surname used by Gondi people. Notable people with the surname include:

- Bhima Mandavi (died 2019), Bharatiya Janata Party politician
- Manoj Singh Mandavi (1964–2022), Indian politician
- Mohan Mandavi (1957), Indian politician
- Sangram Shah (1500-1542), Gond ruler
- Shankar Shah (died 1857), Indian freedom fighter
- Vikram Mandavi (1977), Indian politician
