= Sayaji Baug =

Garden in Vadodara, Gujarat, India

Coordinates: 22.3115°N 73.1900°E

Sayaji Baug (also known as Kamati Baug) is a garden located in Vadodara, Gujarat, India. it was built by Maharaja Sayajirao Gaekwad - a great visionary ruler of Baroda. It is the biggest garden in Western India with the area surrounding more than 100 acres (40 ha). This large park lies across the busy Vadodara Railway Station offering various facilities for tourism as well as for recreation.

== Description ==
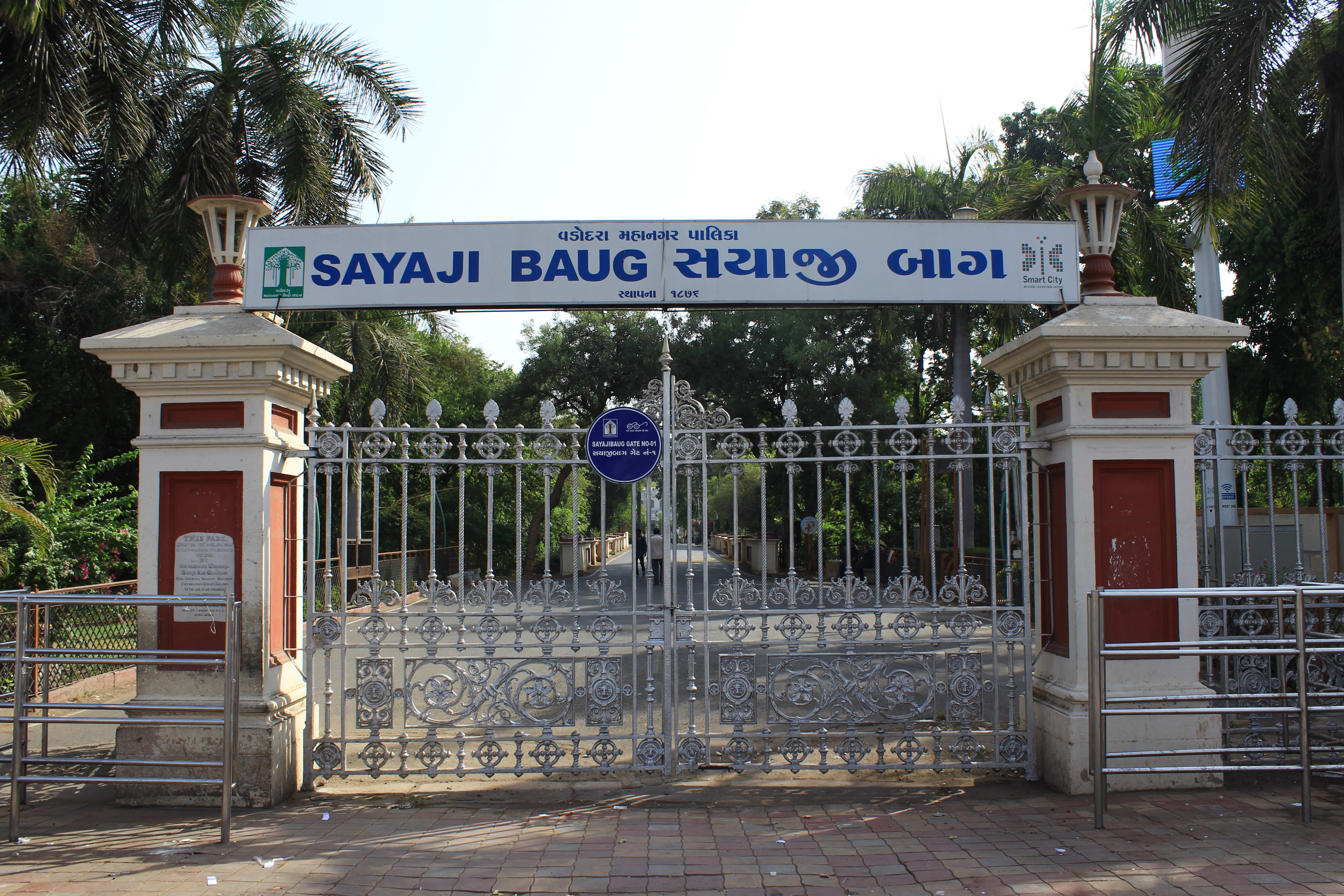
Sayaji Baug Main Gate

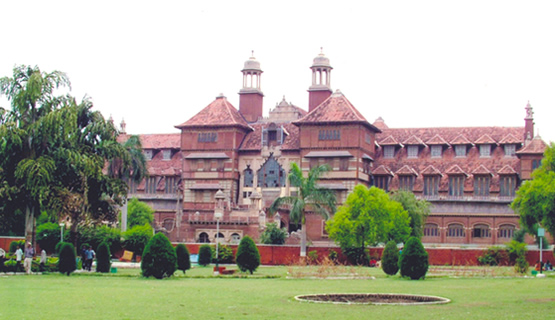
Baroda Museum & Picture Gallery

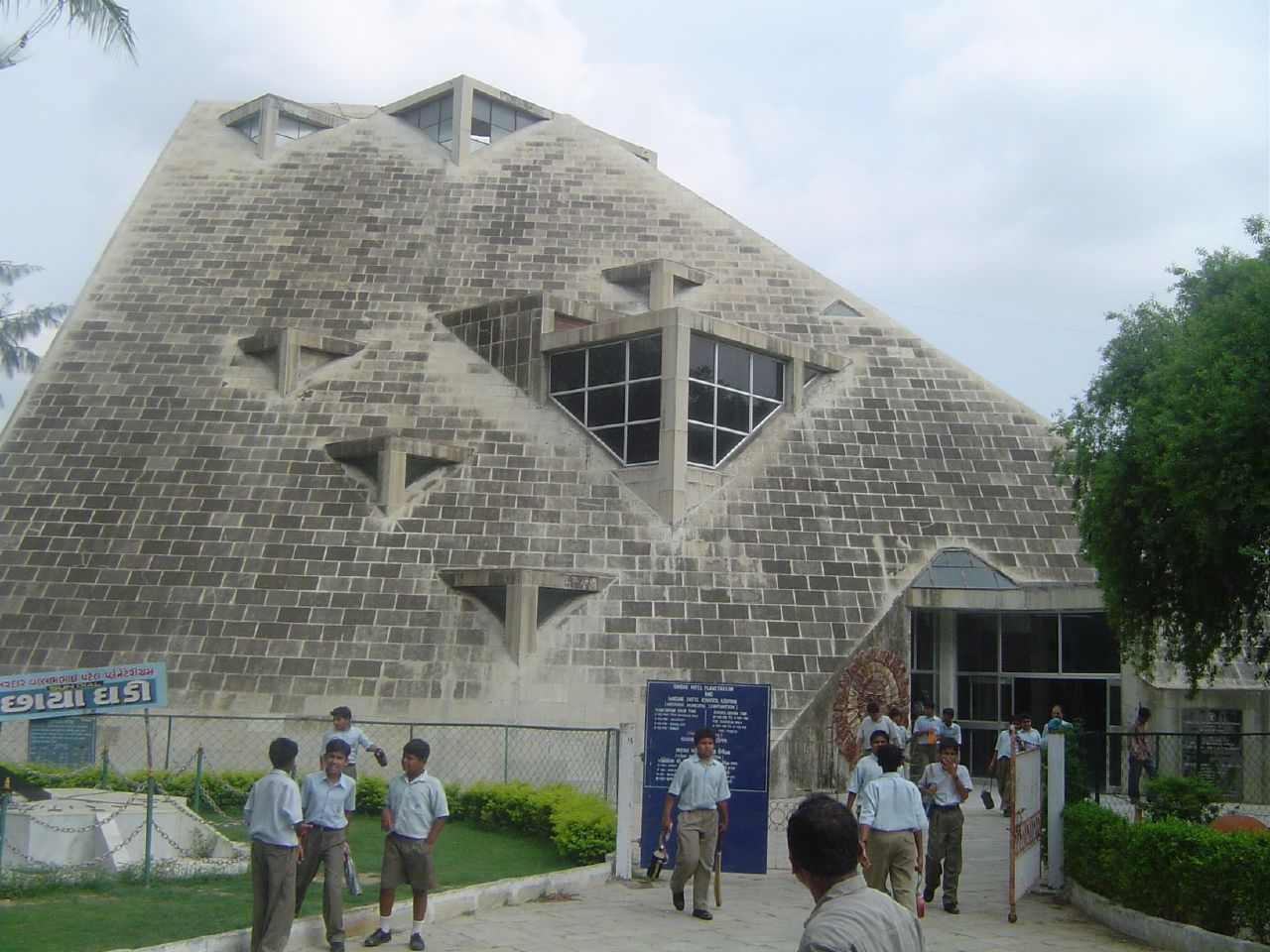
Planetarium

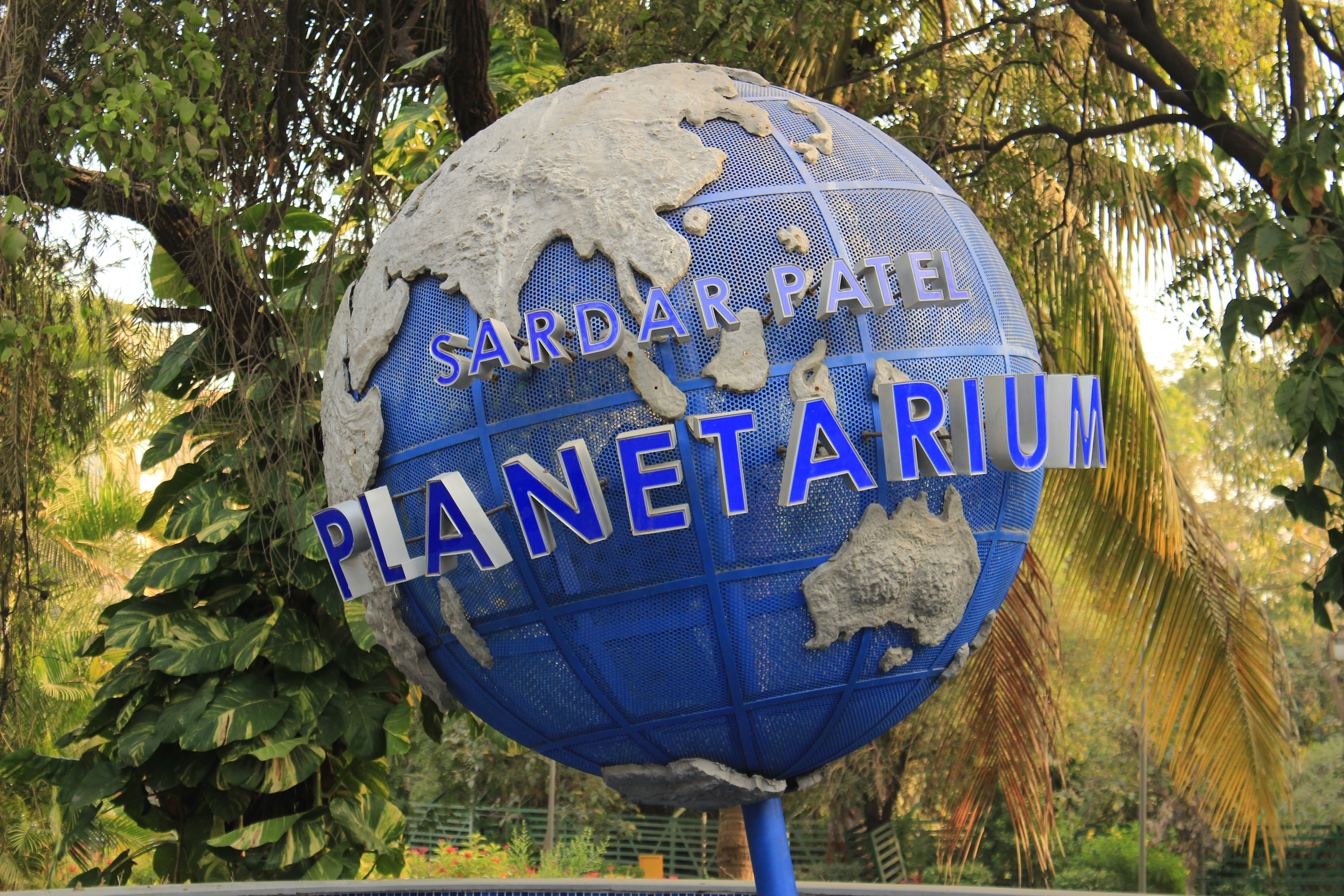
Planetarium

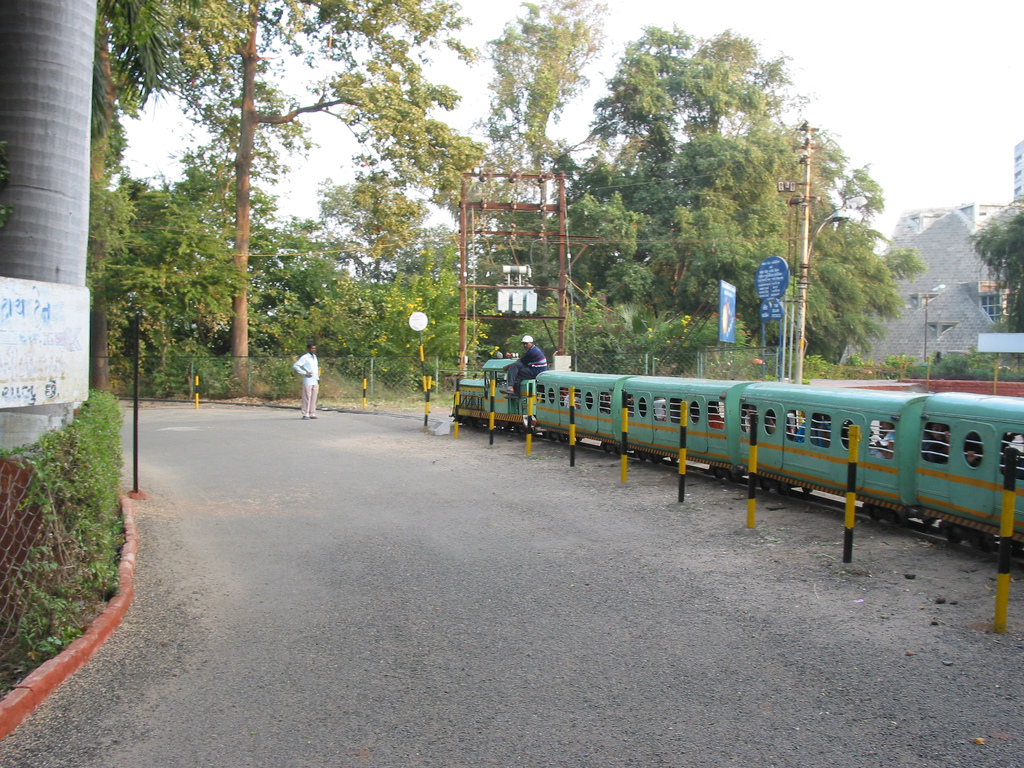
Toy Train

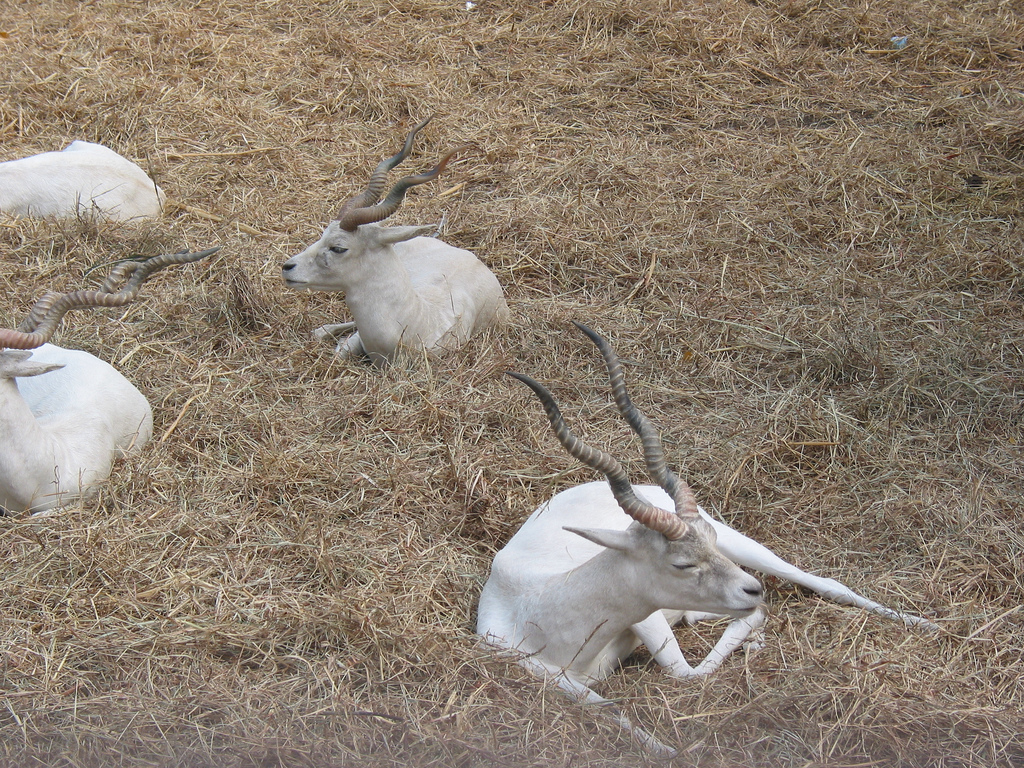
Zoo

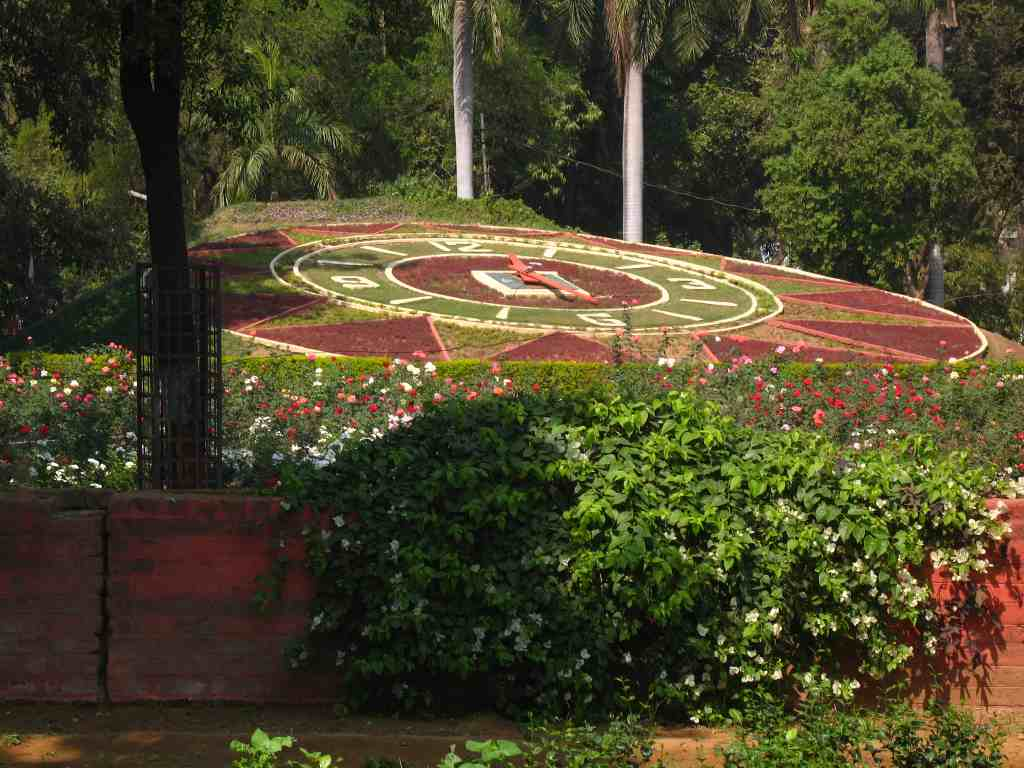
Floral Clock

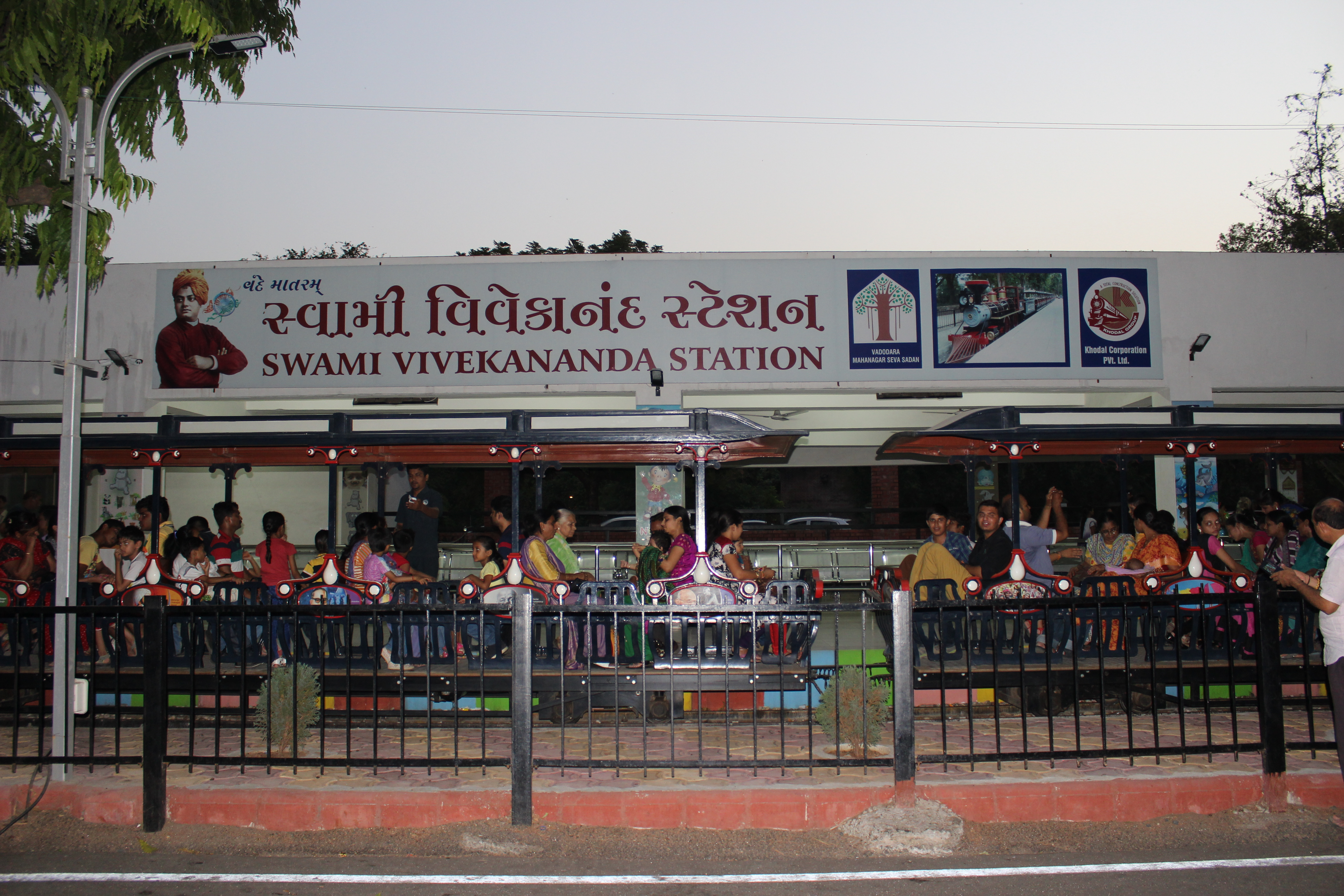
Joy Train Station

Sayaji Baug was dedicated to the citizens of Vadodara by Maharaja Sayaji Rao Gaekwad III in 1879. Sayajirao III built Sayaji Baug, well known as Kamati Baug, on the river Vishwamitri. It is one of the largest public gardens in Western India, sprawling over 113 acres (0.46 km^{2}). It has a rich flora of more than 98 species of trees. It is one of the finest gardens in India, and is maintained by Vadodara Municipal Corporation. Thousands of citizens of the city come here for their morning walk as well as for pleasant view of the garden. The garden is home to the Baroda Museum & Picture Gallery, the Sardar Patel Planetarium, and the Sayaji Baug Zoo.

There are three entrance gates. The main gate is at Sayaji Circle (informally known as "Kala Ghoda Chowk" or "black horse circle" because of an equestrian statue standing there).This gate is only 800 metres (2,600 ft) from the main city railway station and even less from the city bus stand. The third gate is at Rana Pratap square in Fatehganj area, and the second gate stands somewhere in between first and third gates.

== Highlights ==
=== Statues of the Two brave boys of Dhari ===
The Arjan Koli and Hari Koli were two Koli brothers from Dhari town. They saved the life of Maharaja Sayajirao Gaekwad III of Baroda State from a lion during hunting in 1933. After that both brothers were respected in open court (Baroda state darbar) and their bronze statues were established in royal Sayaji Baug (Kamati Baug) by Sayajirao Gaekwad.

=== Baroda Museum & Picture Gallery ===
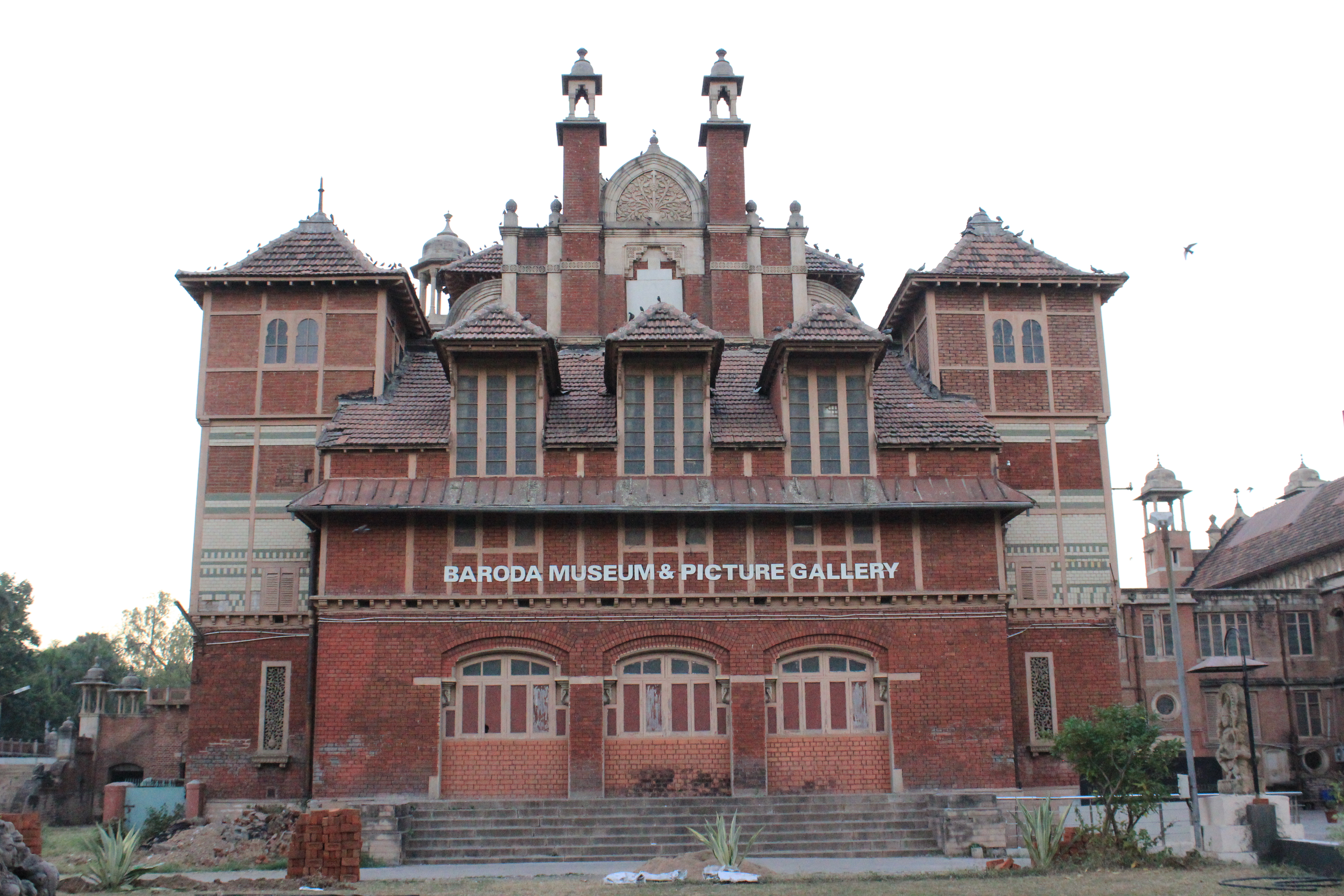
Baroda Museum & Picture Gallery

The museum was built in 1894 to resemble the Victoria & Albert Museum of London. The building was designed by Major Mant and R.F. Chisholm. It preserves a rich collection of art, sculpture, ethnography and ethnology. The picture gallery has diverse works of art from both India and abroad, including works by British painters J. M. W. Turner and John Constable, a gallery of Tibetan art, Akota bronzed dating to the fifth century AD, and a collection of Mughal miniature paintings.

=== Sardar Patel Planetarium ===
The planetarium is situated near the main gate of Sayaji Baug. It is a pyramid-shaped building with a capacity of 200 spectators. It has daily public shows as well as offering special shows to educational institutions. it has shows in Hindi, English and Gujarati. The planetarium also gives you information about a variety of planets and stars.

Show Name :- Saur Pradshan

Monday to Sunday (closed Thursdays)	Language
4:00 pm to 4:30 pm	Gujarati
5:00 pm to 5:30 pm	English
6:00 pm to 6:30 pm	Hindi

=== Toy train ===
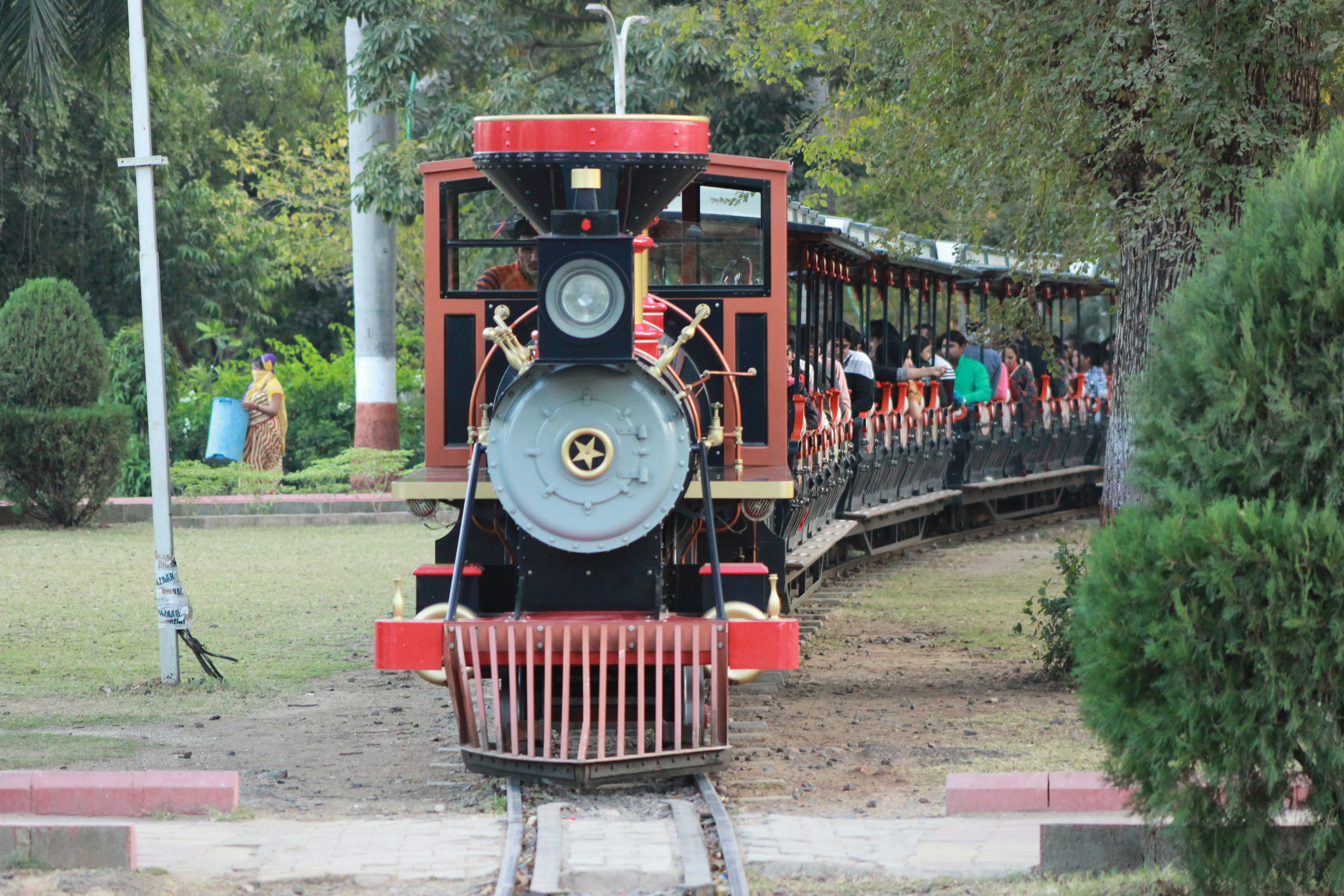
Joy train

The toy train ride used to run on a track of width 10 inches (250 mm) covering a distance of 3.5 km (2.2 mi) giving the entire view of the garden to riders. The ride was a gift to the children of Vadodara from the royal Gaekwad dynasty.

Now a new train has been introduced instead of this small toy train. Its name is joy train in which even adults can sit. Joy train is bigger than the toy train. A new platform "Swami Vivekananda Station" is created for this train. The train timings are from 10 A.M. to 10 P.M. and it is closed on Thursdays. During the full journey of about 20 minutes the people are informed about the heritage of Vadodara and that of Kamati baug(garden) through speakers in the train.

The video for the popular song "Chakke pe Chakka, Chakke pe Gadi..." by Shankar Jaikishan from the film Brahmachari was shot on this train.

=== The zoo and aquarium ===
The Sayaji Baug Zoo, situated on both the banks of the Vishwamitri river, was opened as part of the original park in 1879. The zoo offers 167 types of 1103 animals of various sizes and shapes. Asiatic lions are the most popular of the attractions. it also has a different bird zoo which has many different types of birds.

An aquarium was added to the zoo in 1962. It contains 45 species of fish.

=== Floral clock ===
The floral clock was the first of its kind in the state. It consists of an hour, minute and seconds hand that move on the 20 ft (6.1 m) diameter dial. The machinery moving the clock is underground, giving the clock a natural look.

The floral clock was designed by Ar. Prakash Pethe, who later served as the Town Development Officer for the Vadodara Municipal Corporation.
