= Ahmedpur Mandvi Beach =

Beach in Gujarat, India

Coordinates: 20.739943°N 71.024313°E

Ahmedpur Mandvi Beach is located on the coastline of the state of Gujarat, India. It is located in Ahmedpur Mandvi, near Diu (Union Territory of Daman and Diu) in Gir Somnath District. This is 370 km away from Ahmedabad. and is one of the 14 beaches chosen by the state to promote beach tourism.

== See also ==
- List of beaches in India
