= Climate of Gujarat =

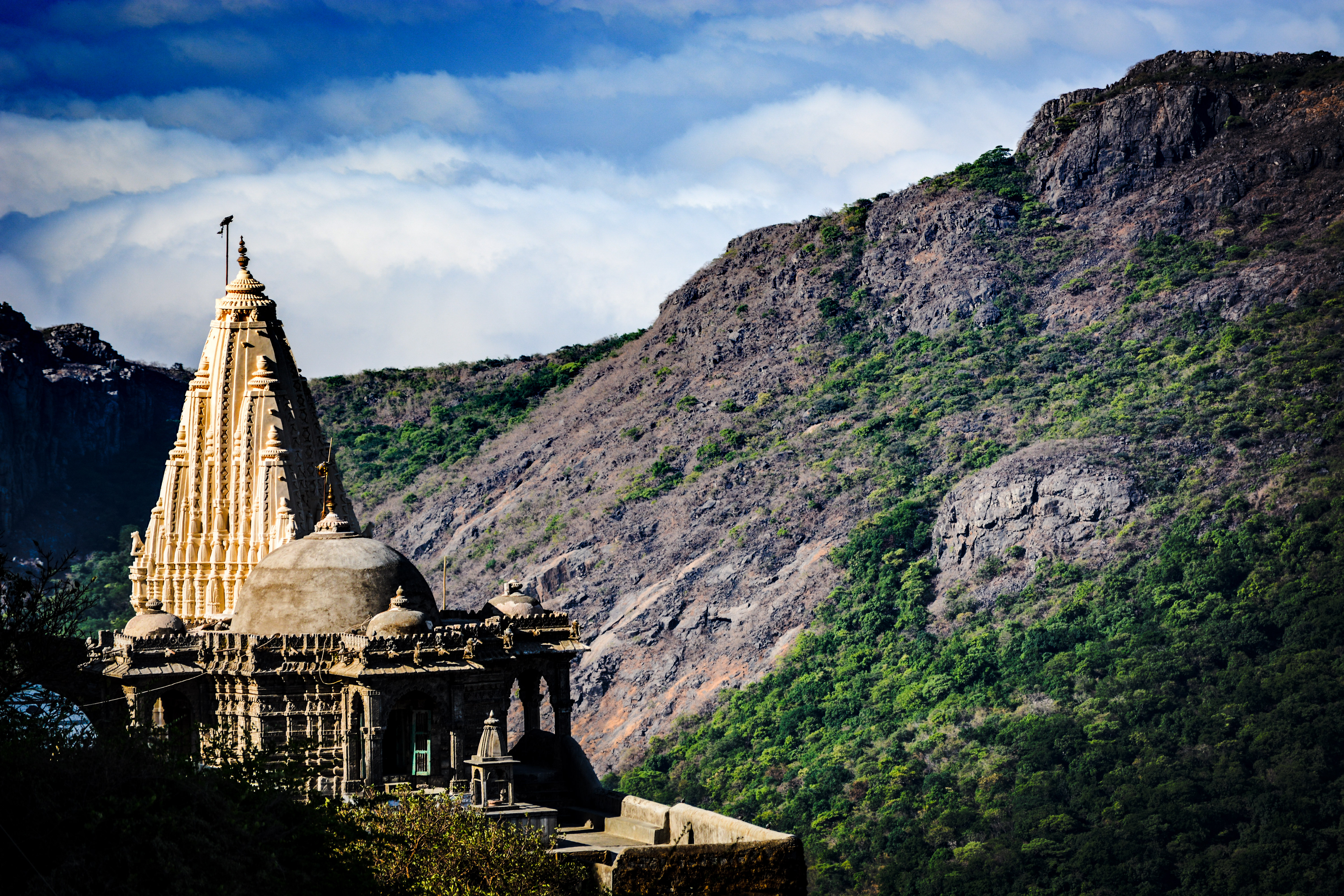
Jain temple located in Girnar mountain range

The climate of Gujarat involves diverse conditions. The plains of Gujarat are very hot and humid in summer and cold and dry in winter. Summer is milder in the hilly regions and the coast. The average daytime temperature during winter is around 29 °C (84 °F) and in nights is around 12 °C (54 °F) with 100 percent sunny days and clear nights. During summers, the daytime temperature is around 49 °C (120 °F) and at night no lower than 30 °C (86 °F). The monsoon season lasts from June to September. Most of Gujarat receives scant rainfall. Southern Gujarat and the hilly regions receive heavy rainfall during the monsoons with high humidity which makes the air feel hotter. There is relief when the monsoon season starts (around mid June). The day temperatures are lowered but humidity is very high and nights are around 27 °C (81 °F). Most of the rainfall occurs in this season, and the rain can cause severe Floods. The sun is often occluded during the monsoon season. Though mostly dry, it is desertic in the north-west, and wet in the southern districts due to a heavy monsoon season.

Gujarat, located on the western coast of India, is impacted by the tropical cyclones originating mostly in the Arabian Sea. There is a positive trend in both the frequency and intensity of cyclonic activity between 2001 and 2019.

== Climate data ==
Climate data for Ahmedabad (Köppen BSh/Aw)
Month	Jan	Feb	Mar	Apr	May	Jun	Jul	Aug	Sep	Oct	Nov	Dec	Year
Record high °C (°F)	36.1 (97.0)	40.6 (105.1)	43.9 (111.0)	46.2 (115.2)	50.0 (122.0)	47.2 (117.0)	42.2 (108.0)	40.4 (104.7)	41.7 (107.1)	42.8 (109.0)	38.9 (102.0)	35.6 (96.1)	50.0 (122.0)
Mean daily maximum °C (°F)	28.1 (82.6)	30.8 (87.4)	35.8 (96.4)	39.6 (103.3)	41.6 (106.9)	38.8 (101.8)	33.6 (92.5)	32.0 (89.6)	33.8 (92.8)	35.7 (96.3)	32.9 (91.2)	29.5 (85.1)	34.3 (93.8)
Daily mean °C (°F)	20.2 (68.4)	22.5 (72.5)	27.6 (81.7)	31.7 (89.1)	34.3 (93.7)	33.1 (91.6)	29.7 (85.5)	28.5 (83.3)	29.2 (84.6)	28.5 (83.3)	24.8 (76.6)	21.4 (70.5)	27.6 (81.7)
Mean daily minimum °C (°F)	12.4 (54.3)	14.3 (57.7)	19.5 (67.1)	23.9 (75.0)	27.0 (80.6)	27.5 (81.5)	25.9 (78.6)	25.0 (77.0)	24.7 (76.5)	21.4 (70.5)	16.7 (62.1)	13.4 (56.1)	21.0 (69.8)
Record low °C (°F)	3.3 (37.9)	2.2 (36.0)	9.4 (48.9)	12.8 (55.0)	19.1 (66.4)	19.4 (66.9)	20.4 (68.7)	21.2 (70.2)	17.2 (63.0)	12.6 (54.7)	8.3 (46.9)	3.6 (38.5)	2.2 (36.0)
Average rainfall mm (inches)	1.2 (0.05)	0.6 (0.02)	1.1 (0.04)	2.5 (0.10)	5.5 (0.22)	84.3 (3.32)	310.1 (12.21)	242.2 (9.54)	120.2 (4.73)	13.1 (0.52)	1.9 (0.07)	0.9 (0.04)	783.6 (30.85)
Average rainy days	0.2	0.1	0.2	0.3	0.3	3.9	11.3	10.3	6.1	0.9	0.3	0.1	34.0
Average relative humidity (%)	49	43	37	41	47	62	77	81	71	53	48	50	55
Average dew point °C (°F)	9 (48)	10 (50)	10 (50)	14 (57)	19 (66)	23 (73)	25 (77)	25 (77)	24 (75)	19 (66)	14 (57)	11 (52)	17 (62)
Mean monthly sunshine hours	287.3	274.3	277.5	297.2	329.6	238.3	130.1	111.4	220.6	290.7	274.1	288.6	3,019.7
Average ultraviolet index	6	8	11	12	12	12	12	12	11	9	7	6	10
Source 1: India Meteorological Department (record high and low up to 2012) Time and Date (dewpoints, 2005-2015)
Source 2: NOAA (sun and humidity 1971–1990), IEM ASOS (May record high) Weather Atlas

Climate data for Surat (Köppen Aw)
Month	Jan	Feb	Mar	Apr	May	Jun	Jul	Aug	Sep	Oct	Nov	Dec	Year
Record high °C (°F)	38.3 (100.9)	41.7 (107.1)	44.0 (111.2)	45.6 (114.1)	45.6 (114.1)	45.6 (114.1)	38.9 (102.0)	37.2 (99.0)	41.1 (106.0)	41.4 (106.5)	39.4 (102.9)	38.9 (102.0)	45.6 (114.1)
Mean daily maximum °C (°F)	30.8 (87.4)	32.3 (90.1)	35.4 (95.7)	36.7 (98.1)	35.8 (96.4)	34.0 (93.2)	31.2 (88.2)	30.8 (87.4)	32.3 (90.1)	35.1 (95.2)	34.1 (93.4)	31.9 (89.4)	33.4 (92.1)
Mean daily minimum °C (°F)	15.2 (59.4)	16.7 (62.1)	20.7 (69.3)	24.0 (75.2)	26.8 (80.2)	27.0 (80.6)	25.9 (78.6)	25.5 (77.9)	25.4 (77.7)	23.3 (73.9)	19.6 (67.3)	16.5 (61.7)	22.2 (72.0)
Record low °C (°F)	4.4 (39.9)	5.6 (42.1)	8.9 (48.0)	15.0 (59.0)	19.4 (66.9)	20.2 (68.4)	19.9 (67.8)	21.0 (69.8)	20.6 (69.1)	14.4 (57.9)	10.6 (51.1)	6.7 (44.1)	4.4 (39.9)
Average rainfall mm (inches)	1.9 (0.07)	0.3 (0.01)	0.7 (0.03)	0.5 (0.02)	2.4 (0.09)	255.9 (10.07)	466.3 (18.36)	281.7 (11.09)	186.7 (7.35)	40.7 (1.60)	5.1 (0.20)	1.1 (0.04)	1,243.3 (48.95)
Average rainy days	0.2	0.1	0.1	0.1	0.2	8.0	15.0	12.3	8.1	2.0	0.5	0.1	46.7
Average relative humidity (%) (at 17:30 IST)	41	34	33	42	58	70	80	79	70	52	44	43	53
Average dew point °C (°F)	9 (48)	10 (50)	10 (50)	14 (57)	19 (66)	23 (73)	25 (77)	25 (77)	24 (75)	19 (66)	14 (57)	11 (52)	17 (62)
Average ultraviolet index	6	7	7	8	8	7	6	6	7	7	7	6	7
Source 1: India Meteorological Department Time and Date (dewpoints, 2005-2015)
Source 2: Weather Atlas

Climate data for Vadodara (Köppen BSh/Aw)
Month	Jan	Feb	Mar	Apr	May	Jun	Jul	Aug	Sep	Oct	Nov	Dec	Year
Record high °C (°F)	37.4 (99.3)	40.6 (105.1)	44.2 (111.6)	45.9 (114.6)	46.2 (115.2)	45.6 (114.1)	40.1 (104.2)	39.1 (102.4)	41.1 (106.0)	41.4 (106.5)	39.4 (102.9)	37.2 (99.0)	46.2 (115.2)
Mean daily maximum °C (°F)	29.7 (85.5)	32.0 (89.6)	36.3 (97.3)	39.1 (102.4)	39.9 (103.8)	37.2 (99.0)	32.6 (90.7)	31.5 (88.7)	33.4 (92.1)	35.9 (96.6)	33.7 (92.7)	30.9 (87.6)	34.4 (93.9)
Mean daily minimum °C (°F)	13.2 (55.8)	14.9 (58.8)	19.2 (66.6)	23.6 (74.5)	27.0 (80.6)	27.5 (81.5)	26.0 (78.8)	25.3 (77.5)	25.0 (77.0)	22.2 (72.0)	17.6 (63.7)	14.1 (57.4)	21.3 (70.3)
Record low °C (°F)	2.8 (37.0)	3.9 (39.0)	9.3 (48.7)	14.4 (57.9)	19.4 (66.9)	21.2 (70.2)	22.2 (72.0)	21.7 (71.1)	18.1 (64.6)	12.8 (55.0)	6.0 (42.8)	5.5 (41.9)	2.8 (37.0)
Average rainfall mm (inches)	1.2 (0.05)	0.0 (0.0)	0.1 (0.00)	1.0 (0.04)	6.3 (0.25)	169.6 (6.68)	299.5 (11.79)	265.5 (10.45)	172.4 (6.79)	24.9 (0.98)	6.7 (0.26)	0.8 (0.03)	946.0 (37.24)
Average rainy days	0.2	0.0	0.0	0.1	0.3	4.1	12.5	11.8	5.6	1.2	0.4	0.1	36.3
Average relative humidity (%) (at 17:30 IST)	36	29	25	23	32	51	74	75	63	44	41	41	45
Source: India Meteorological Department

Climate data for Rajkot (Köppen BSh)
Month	Jan	Feb	Mar	Apr	May	Jun	Jul	Aug	Sep	Oct	Nov	Dec	Year
Record high °C (°F)	36.4 (97.5)	40.0 (104.0)	43.9 (111.0)	44.7 (112.5)	47.9 (118.2)	45.8 (114.4)	40.6 (105.1)	38.8 (101.8)	42.8 (109.0)	41.9 (107.4)	38.4 (101.1)	36.4 (97.5)	47.9 (118.2)
Mean daily maximum °C (°F)	28.4 (83.1)	30.9 (87.6)	35.5 (95.9)	39.1 (102.4)	40.5 (104.9)	37.8 (100.0)	33.0 (91.4)	31.6 (88.9)	33.6 (92.5)	35.9 (96.6)	33.2 (91.8)	29.9 (85.8)	34.1 (93.4)
Mean daily minimum °C (°F)	12.8 (55.0)	15.0 (59.0)	19.2 (66.6)	22.6 (72.7)	25.4 (77.7)	26.5 (79.7)	25.4 (77.7)	24.4 (75.9)	23.8 (74.8)	22.4 (72.3)	18.4 (65.1)	14.4 (57.9)	20.9 (69.6)
Record low °C (°F)	−0.6 (30.9)	1.1 (34.0)	6.1 (43.0)	10.0 (50.0)	16.1 (61.0)	20.0 (68.0)	19.4 (66.9)	20.1 (68.2)	16.7 (62.1)	12.2 (54.0)	7.2 (45.0)	2.8 (37.0)	−0.6 (30.9)
Average rainfall mm (inches)	0.8 (0.03)	0.3 (0.01)	0.1 (0.00)	1.4 (0.06)	5.4 (0.21)	108.4 (4.27)	253.4 (9.98)	165.3 (6.51)	115.1 (4.53)	19.3 (0.76)	6.3 (0.25)	0.3 (0.01)	676.1 (26.62)
Average rainy days	0.1	0.1	0.0	0.2	0.1	4.4	9.6	8.0	5.0	1.3	0.3	0.1	29.1
Average relative humidity (%) (at 17:30 IST)	27	24	21	21	30	51	70	71	58	32	29	29	38
Source: India Meteorological Department

== See also ==
- List of Gujarat tropical cyclones
