= Rukmavati River =

River in India

Coordinates: 22.84°N 69.36°E

The Rukmavati River is a south flowing river originating in the central Kutch District and empties into the Arabian Sea in the state of Gujarat. Mandvi, an ancient port town, is located on the banks of this river just at the mouth where it meets the Arabian Sea near the Gulf of Kachchh.
