= Vishwamitri River =

River in India

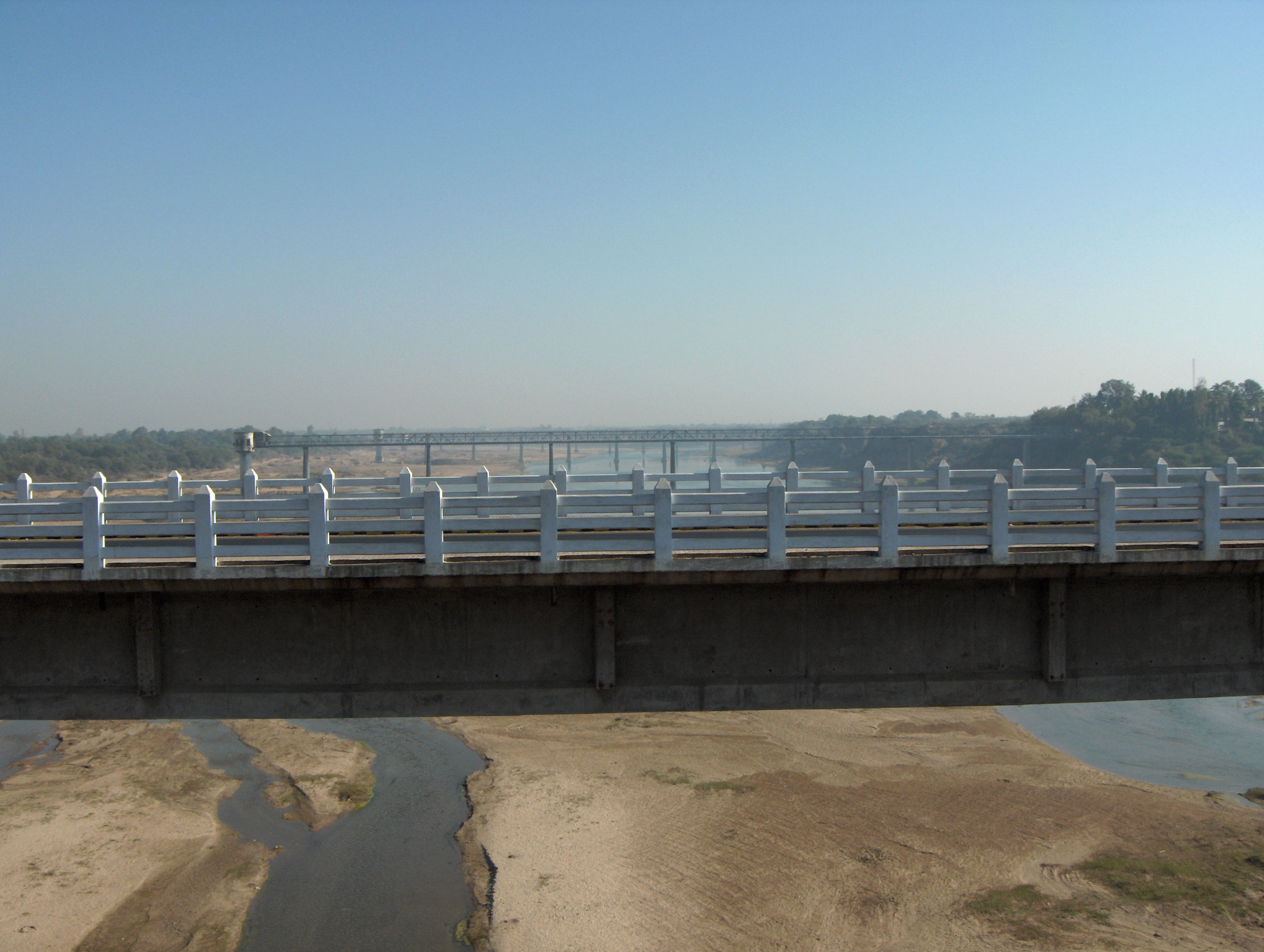
- Vishwamitri River, near Vadodara

Vishwamitri River is a non-perennial river in the state of Gujarat, India. Originating from Pavagadh in the Panchmahal District of Gujarat, the river flows westward through the city of Vadodara before draining into the Gulf of Khambhat. The river's name is thought to be derived from the name of the sage Vishwamitra. Human settlement dating back to 1000 B.C has been found on the bank of river Vishwamitri. In the beginning of the Common Era, a small township was developed on a mound on the banks of this river which later came to be known as Ankotakka (currently known as Akota). The river was important to the settlement of Vadodara.

Vishwamitri is part of a larger river system includes the Sayaji Sarovar on the Vishwamitri River near Ajwa, and the Dev Dam on the Dhadhar Branch. Its flow is from East to West in between two large perennial rivers Mahi and Narmada. The Vishwamitri River banks are home to multiple of places of historical importance like Chhatri, Pratappura Sarovar, Old Bridge, Suspension Bridge, Boat House. Vishwamitri is known for its population of Mugger crocodiles, a threatened reptile species in India that is legally protected under Schedule I of the Indian Wildlife (Protection) Act, 1972.

== Dams and sarovars ==
=== Ajwa Dam ===
This dam is built in the early 20th century by Maharaja Sayajirao Gaekwad III. It solves the purpose of providing water to the vadodara city. Height of the dam is 211 feet above sea level and its 5 km long. It has 62 gates and directly connected to Vishwamitri river. Though Vishwamitri river is seasonal river so Sardar Sarovar's one branch is required to fulfil the need whenever needed. Also reports says that it is the home of more than 300 crocodiles.

=== Pratappura Sarovar ===
This sarovar is built by Maharaja Sayajirao Gaekwad III. It is also known as Pratapsinh Tank. The main purpose to build this sarovar is to supply water in Ajwa Reservoir. There are seven gates on sarovar from which three gates are connected to the Vishwamitri River. Whenever an emergency occurs, where the Ajwa Reservoir is full then the excess water is sent off to the Vishwamitri River.

== Nearby attractions ==
=== Ajwa Gardens ===
It is located at 23 km away from Vadodara. Also, Sayaji Sarovar is situated near these gardens. These gardens resemble the Vrindavan Garden, and has many illuminated fountains. There is also a separate musical fountain which is an attraction for the visitors.

=== Sayaji Baug ===
It is also known as kamati baug. It is located on Vishwamitri river. It is built by Maharaja Sayajirao Gaekwad III. This park contains many fountains, lawns and many types of trees. Apart from all these, it has a zoo, aquarium, toy train, Historical Museum, small Museum of Health and Hygiene and many more. In addition to all, Vadodara Municipal Corporation also built the Floral Clock. This is a major attraction for visitors to Sayaji Baug. It has minute hand and second hand which is constructed on 20 ft diameter dial. To give a more natural look to this clock all the machinery is underground.

=== Suspension Bridge ===
As Vishwamitri river flows through the park there is a need of path from the zoo to the park. This was the main purpose to build this bridge. Initially, It was designed by Gaekwad III but in 1964, the bridge crumbled down due to heavy rush in the garden during the Fugga Agiyaras Festival. After this event Vadodara Municipal Corporation has decided to make a similar bridge at the same place. Now it has become a major attraction for the park.

=== Chhatri ===
It is an ornate structure built on the Vishwamitri bridge in Vadodara city. The structure was commissioned by Maharaja Sayajirao Gaekwad III. The structure is like an octagonal structure. It has eight pillars. It is made up of stone from Saurashtra.

=== Boat House ===
It is located on the banks of Vishwamitri River. It is near the Sangramsinh Gaekwad Sports Academy. The main reason to put this as an attraction for visitors because of its carved eaves and finials.

== Water pollution and flooding ==
The Vishwamitri river system which flows through the heart of the city of Vadodara has over the years suffered due to urbanization and industrialization. Despite having multiple dams on the river system, it remains subject to floods and thus suffers floodplain encroachment and storm water outfalls. Neglect towards the maintenance of the river and release of sewage waters, industrial effluents and other sources of pollution has led to the deterioration.

Some of the major gauge stations built on this river to keep floods in check are Ajwa, Pratappura, City Bridge, Bhaniara, Dhanora, Ghansarvav, Haripura, Vadadala, Shivrajpur in Vadodara and Halol and Deo Dam in Panchmahal.

According to a study done by School of Natural Resources and Environment, University of Michigan and commissioned by ASP(Amrut Sitaram Pradhan) Foundation, the major causes of the degradation are improper sewage management, increased impervious surface and deforestation throughout the watershed, encroachment within the floodplain, lack of concern for ecological processes, invasive species, open dumping of solid waste and lack of sensitivity for historical context in development.

Since 1994, there have been more than 8 floods in this river. The river not only floods the low-lying parts of the city but also endangers the crocodiles living in the river and is a cause for animal-people conflict as these crocodiles are now in human occupied territory. Vadodara Municipal Corporation (VMC) has started a Vishwamitri Riverfront Development Project(VDRP) for the development of Vishwamitri River and for control of floods

== Vaho Vishwamitri abhiyan ==
This abhiyaan (campaign) is started to majorly focus on developing a bioshield on the banks of Vishwamitri River. Targeted area is from Pavagadh Hills to Bay of Khambhat. The main purpose of this abhiyaan (campaign) is environmental protection and water conservation. This will lead to better animal habitat and it also tries to improve the quality of organic farming. Under this Abhiyaan, Drones are used for plantation purpose. There are many tree plantation workshops were organized as a part of this project.

Technical experts in GOG, GOI and the World Bank have appreciated and accepted the holistic plan as technically feasible and beneficial.
