= Peelowani =

Village in Rajasthan, India

Peelowani is a village located in the Desuri tehsil of Pali district in the Indian state of Rajasthan. Situated approximately 50 kilometers from both the sub-district (Desuri) and district (Pali) headquarters, it falls under the administration of the Ghenari gram panchayat.

== Geography ==
The village spans a total geographical area of 991.64 hectares.

== Demographics ==
As per the 2011 Census of India, Peelowani has a population of 2,416 individuals residing in 421 households.

The literacy rate in Peelowani stands at 74.23%, higher than the state average of 66.11%. Male literacy is notably higher at 85.99%, while female literacy is 61.95%.

== Social Composition ==
Scheduled Castes make up 15.89% of the village's population, while there is no recorded Scheduled Tribe population.

== Economy and Occupation ==
Out of the total population, 866 individuals are engaged in work activities.

== Education ==
Peelowani is equipped with educational facilities, including government and private institutions. The village has a government primary school, a private primary school, a government middle school, a private middle school, a government secondary school, and a government senior secondary school.

== Healthcare ==
In terms of healthcare, the village has a primary health sub-centre staffed by two paramedical personnel. The nearest community health centre and primary health centre are located more than 10 kilometers away from Peelowani. Additionally, there is a veterinary hospital within the village, staffed by one doctor and one paramedical staff member.

== Transportation ==
Peelowani is connected by public bus services. The nearest railway station is located more than 10 kilometers away from the village.

== Postal Information ==
The postal code for Peelowani is 306502.

== Administrative Details ==
The village is administrated by a sarpanch, who is the elected representative as per the Panchayati Raj system. As of the 2019 statistics, Peelowani falls under the Marwar Junction Vidhan Sabha constituency and the Pali Lok Sabha constituency.

== Nearby Villages ==
Adjacent villages to Peelowani include Khinwara (4 km), Kerli (7 km), Sanwalta (7 km), Gajnipura (9 km), and Jeewand Kallan (9 km). Nearby cities are Sadri, Bali, Falna, and Pali.

== Cultural Note ==
Peelowani is recognized as a jagiri thikana of the Mutha Rajpurohit community of the Jodhpur Marwar state.
