= Ghanerao =

- village
- Location in Rajasthan, India
- Coordinates: 25.2333°N 73.5333°E
- Country: India
- State: Rajasthan
- District: Pali
- Talukas: Desuri

Government
  - Body: Gram panchayat
- Elevation: 380 m (1,250 ft)

Population (2001)
  - Total: 7,650

Languages
  - Official: English, Hindi, Marwadi
- Time zone: UTC+5:30 (IST)
- ISO 3166 code: IN-RJ
- Vehicle registration: RJ-22
- Sex ratio: 1050 ♂/♀
- Lok Sabha constituency: Pali (Lok Sabha constituency)
- Vidhan Sabha constituency: Pali
- Civic agency: Gram Panchayat
- Avg. annual temperature: 30 °C (86 °F)
- Avg. summer temperature: 44 °C (111 °F)
- Avg. winter temperature: 05 °C (41 °F)

Ghanerao is a village in Desuri tehsil of Pali district of Rajasthan.

The village is located on the Sadri-Desuri road State Highway 16. Due to its proximity to Kumbhalgarh fort, Ranakpur Jain temple and Kumbhalgarh Wildlife Sanctuary, it is an important place in tourism with history. Towards southeast of Ghanerao, there are ruins of an old fort on top of a hill, which were built by Kishan Singh Mertiya, son of Gopal Singh, the founder of Ghanerao.

== History ==
Ghanerao was a princely thikana of 37 villages founded in 1606, by Thakur Gopal Singh Mertiya, during the reign of Maharana Amar Singh. It was a member of two states Jodhpur State as well as Udaipur State. Ghanerao was granted first class judicial powers by Jodhpur State. Ghanerao Jagir consisted of around 38 villages, with annual revenue of 37600 rupees, out of which 3098 rupees were paid as annual tribute to Jodhpur State.

== Temples ==
There are many Hindu and Jain temples in and around Ghanerao. In the village, there are many Hindu temples such as Laxmi Narayanji, Murlidhar and Charbhujaji. On the outskirts of the village is situated a ‘mahanth’ (Sant) known as Giriji Ki Dhani. The village have many temples of Riddhi & Siddhi Gajanand, a Sri Mahalaxmi ji, Goddess Nagnechiya, Sri Britwesar Mahadev Temple {Sri Bohra Shrimali Brahmins}. There are about 14 Jain temples, some of them are quite old, Muchhal Mahavir Temple being the most notable one and among the five Jain tirths of Godwar. The Bratwesher mahadev ji temple was pronounced 'Britwesar Mahadev' by the British, resulting in a name change to Britwaiser Mahadev Temple.

== Ghanerao Fort ==
The village has a fort which is now a heritage hotel.

== Demographics ==
The population of Ghanerao is 7,650 according to a 2001 census, where male population is 3,732 and female population is 3,918.

== Notable places ==
- Ghanerao Castle
- Mahavira Jain temple, constructed around 1020 CE
- Ghanerao Jungle Lodge (Bagha Ka Bagh)
- Sri Shrimali Brahmins Mahalaxmi Tempal Ghanerao
- Sri Britwaser Mahadev (Lord Shive Ji)Temple {Sri Bohra Shrimali Brahmins}
