= State Highway 67 (Rajasthan) =

Road in Rajasthan, India

State Highway 67

Route information
- Length: 87 km (54 mi)

Major junctions
- West end: Sardarsamand, Pali District, Rajasthan
- East end: Desuri, Pali District, Rajasthan

Location
- Country: India
- State: Rajasthan
- Districts: Rajasthan: Pali district
- Primary destinations: Pali, Ramsiya, Somesar, Nadol, Narlai

Highway system
- Roads in India; Expressways; National; State; Asian; State Highways in Rajasthan

State Highway 67 ( RJ SH 67) is a state highway in Rajasthan state of India that connects Sardarsamand in Pali district of Rajasthan with Desuri in the same district of Rajasthan. The total length of RJ SH 67 is 87 km.

This highway connects RJ SH 61 in Sardarsamand to RJ SH 62 in Desuri. It also crosses National Highway 14 and National Highway 65 in Pali

Other cities and towns on this highway are: Pali, Ramsiya, Somesar, Nadol, Narlai.

== See also ==
- List of state highways in Rajasthan
- Roads in Pali district
