= Kherwa, Pali =

Kherwa
- village
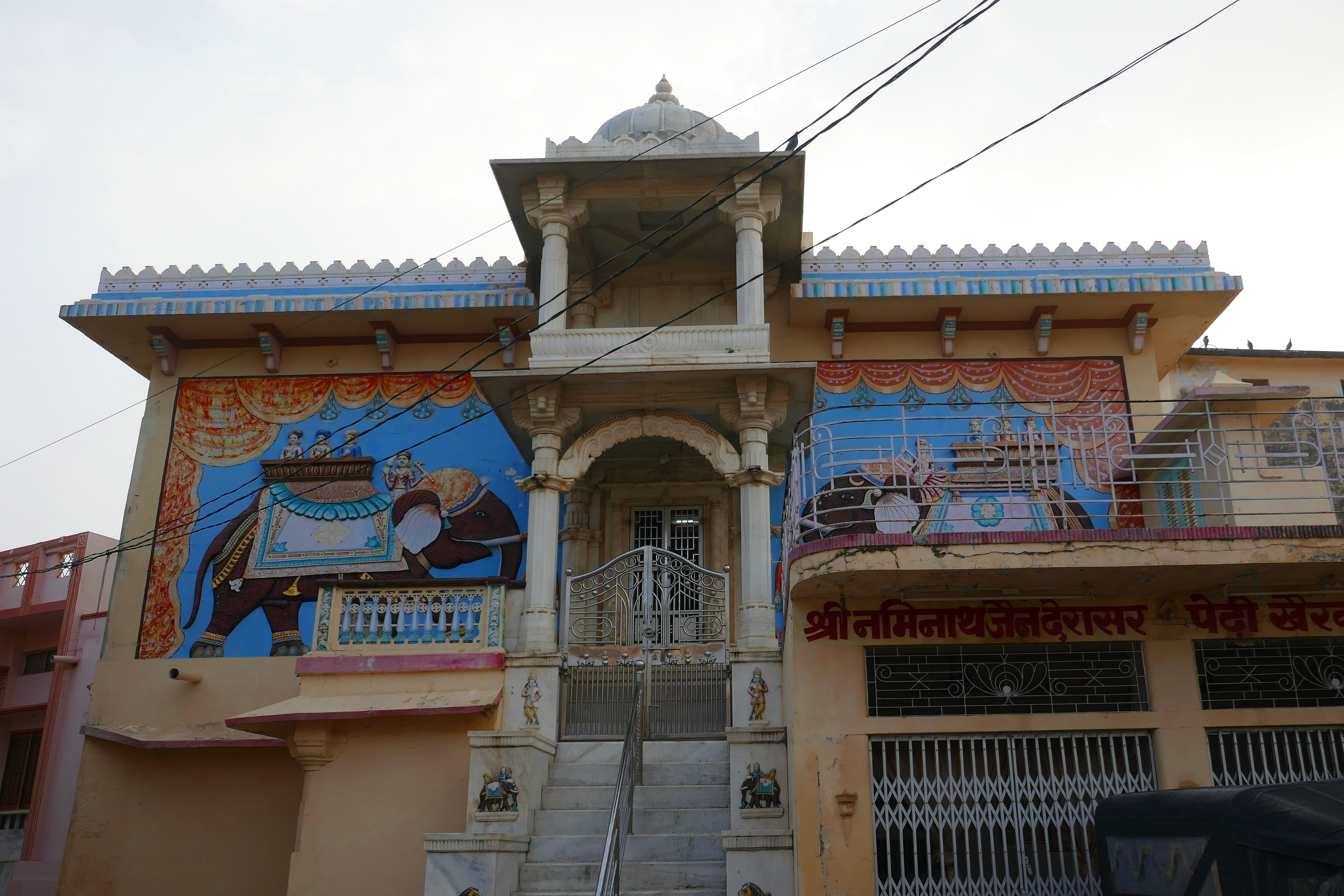
- Kherwa Jain temple

- Location in Rajasthan, India Kherwa (India)
- Coordinates: 25.6744074°N 73.4601259°E
- Country: India
- State: Rajasthan
- District: Pali
- PIN: 306501
- Lok Sabha constituency: Pali (Lok Sabha constituency)
- Vidhan Sabha constituency: Pali

Kherwa is a village in Pali district, Rajasthan, India. It is located south-east of Pali and midway between Hemawas and Marwar Junction.

The Vijaynadi Mandir is located here, near the Marwar Junction railway station. The mandir, or temple, is especially supported by the Bharajwal, Sharma, Joshi, Tiwari, Maheshwari and Rajput clans and can accommodate up to around 50 people overnight.
