= Ranakpur =

- Rural
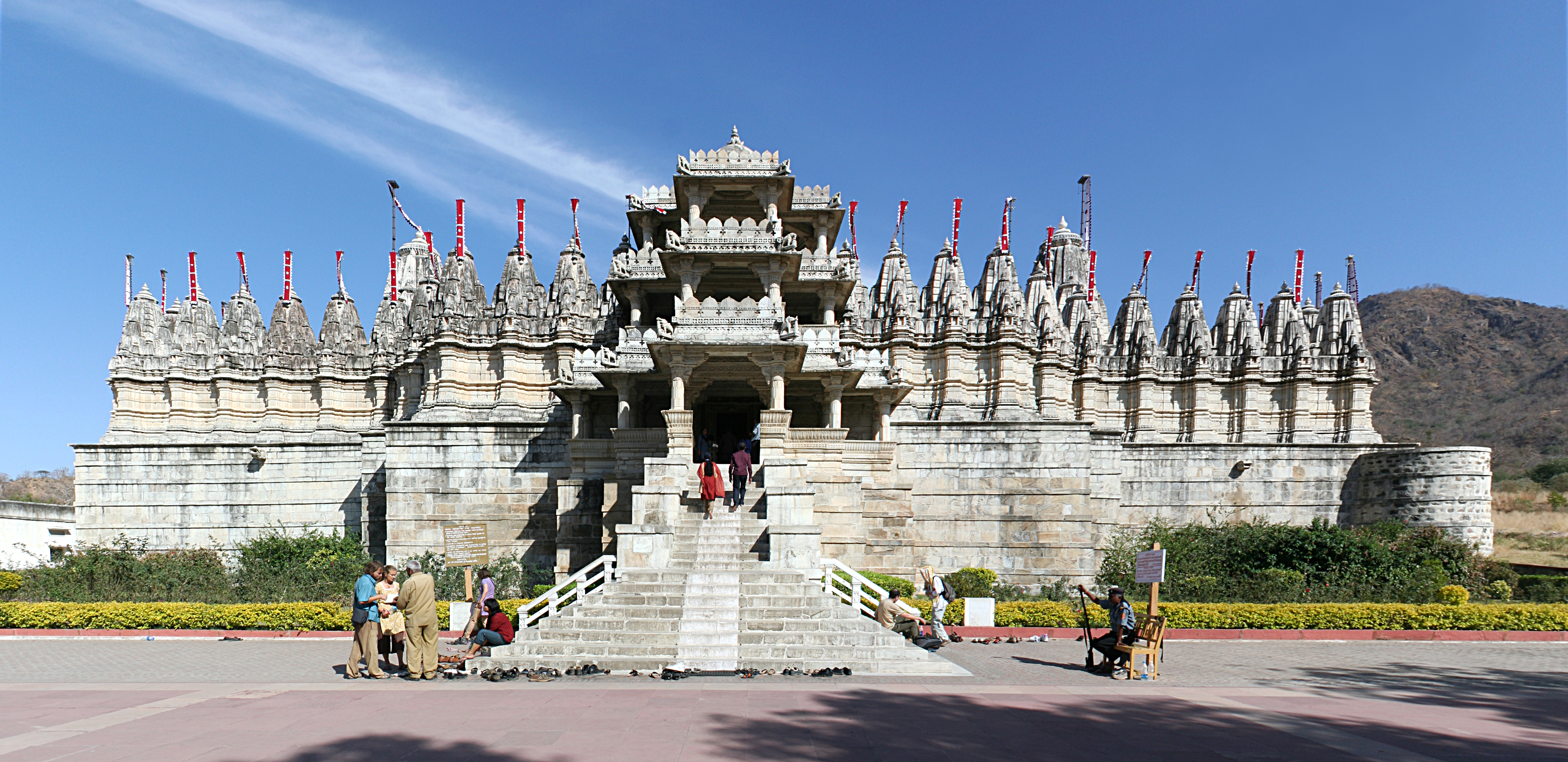
- Ranakpur Jain temple

- Location in Rajasthan, India Ranakpur (India)
- Coordinates: 25.135°N 73.447°E
- Country: India
- State: Rajasthan
- District: Pali

Languages
  - Official: Hindi, Rajasthani
- Time zone: UTC+5:30 (IST)
- PIN: 306702
- Telephone code: 02934
- ISO 3166 code: RJ-IN
- Vehicle registration: RJ-22

Ranakpur is a village located in Desuri tehsil near Pali city in the Pali district of Rajasthan in western India. The nearest Municipality is Sadri. Ranakpur is located between Jodhpur and Udaipur, 162 km from Jodhpur and 91 km from Udaipur, in a valley on the western side of the Aravalli Range. The nearest railway station to reach Ranakpur is Falna and Rani railway station. Ranakpur is easily accessed by road from Udaipur, Pali district in Rajasthan. Ranakpur is one of the most famous places to visit in Pali, Rajasthan and is widely known for its marble Jain temple, which is said to be one of the most spectacular Jain temples.

== Jain temple ==
The renowned Jain temple at Ranakpur is dedicated to Tirthankara Adinatha. Local legend has it that Dharma Shah, a local Jain businessperson, started construction of the temple in the 15th century following a divine vision. The temple honours Adinath, the first Tirthankar of the present half-cycle (avasarpiṇī) according to Jain cosmology. The town of Ranakpur and the temple are named after the provincial ruler monarch, Rana Kumbha who supported the construction of the temple.

== Picture gallery ==
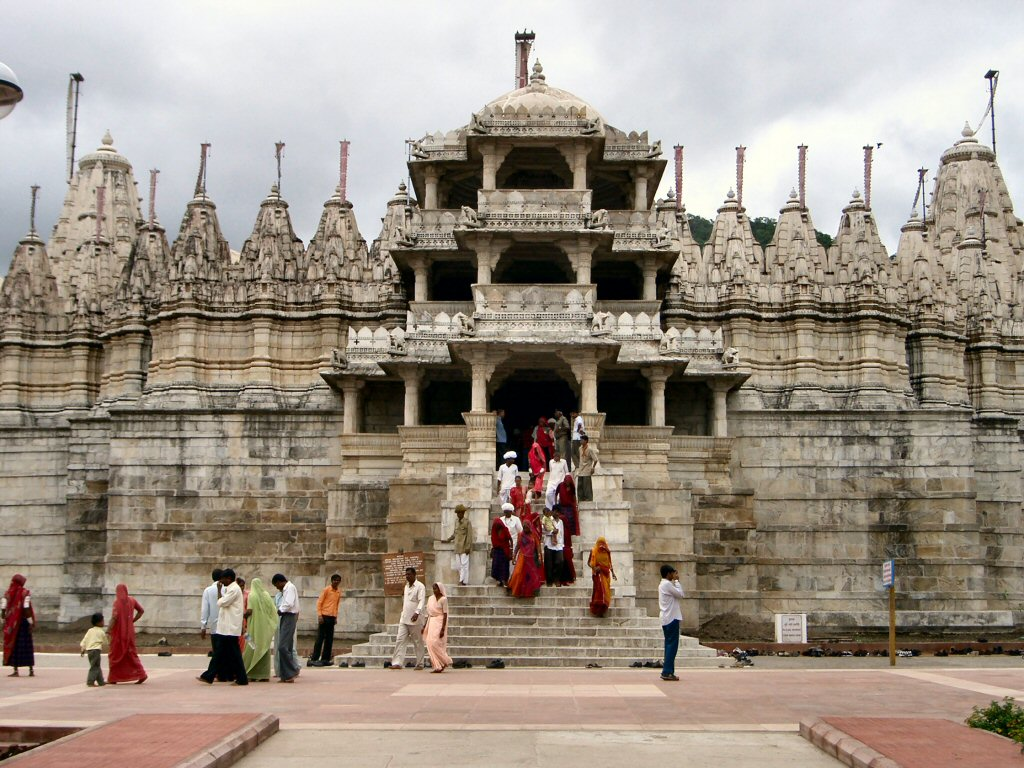
Worshipers leaving the temple at Ranakpur

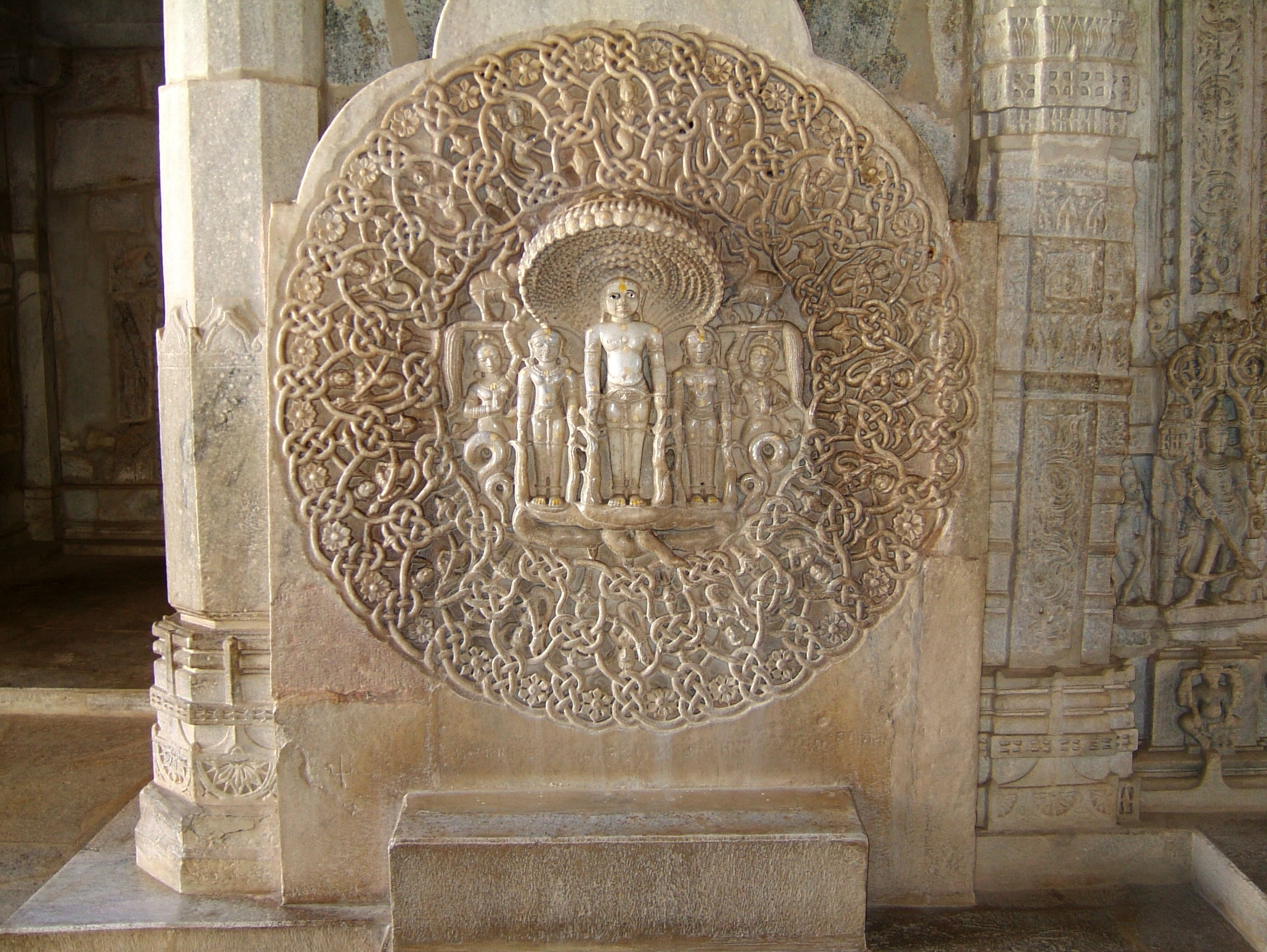
The deity of Shri Parshwanathjee with 108 heads of snakes and numerous tails. One cannot find the end of the tails.

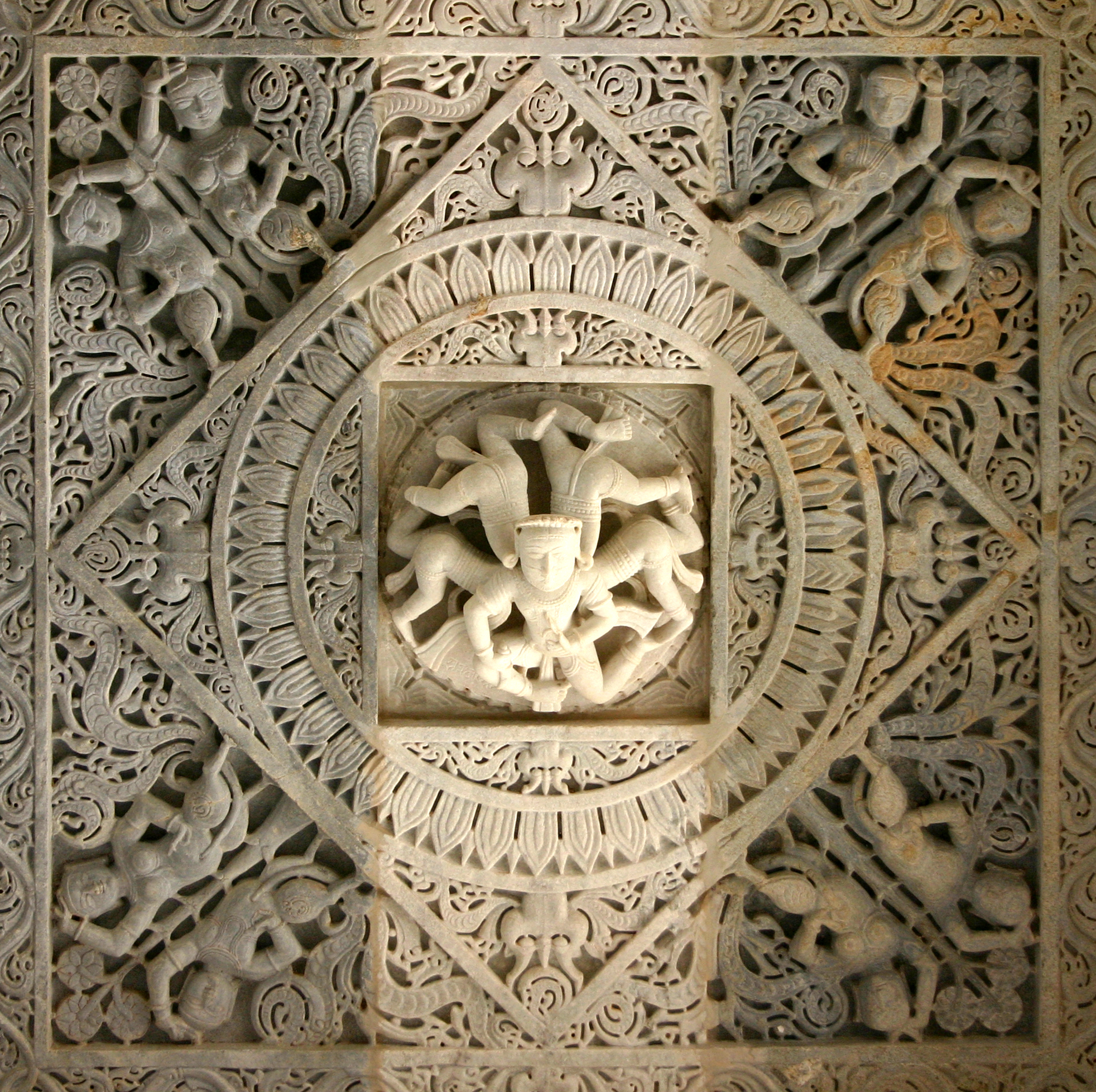
The ceiling at the entrance is decorated with akichaka, a bearded man with five bodies representing fire, water, heaven, earth, and air.

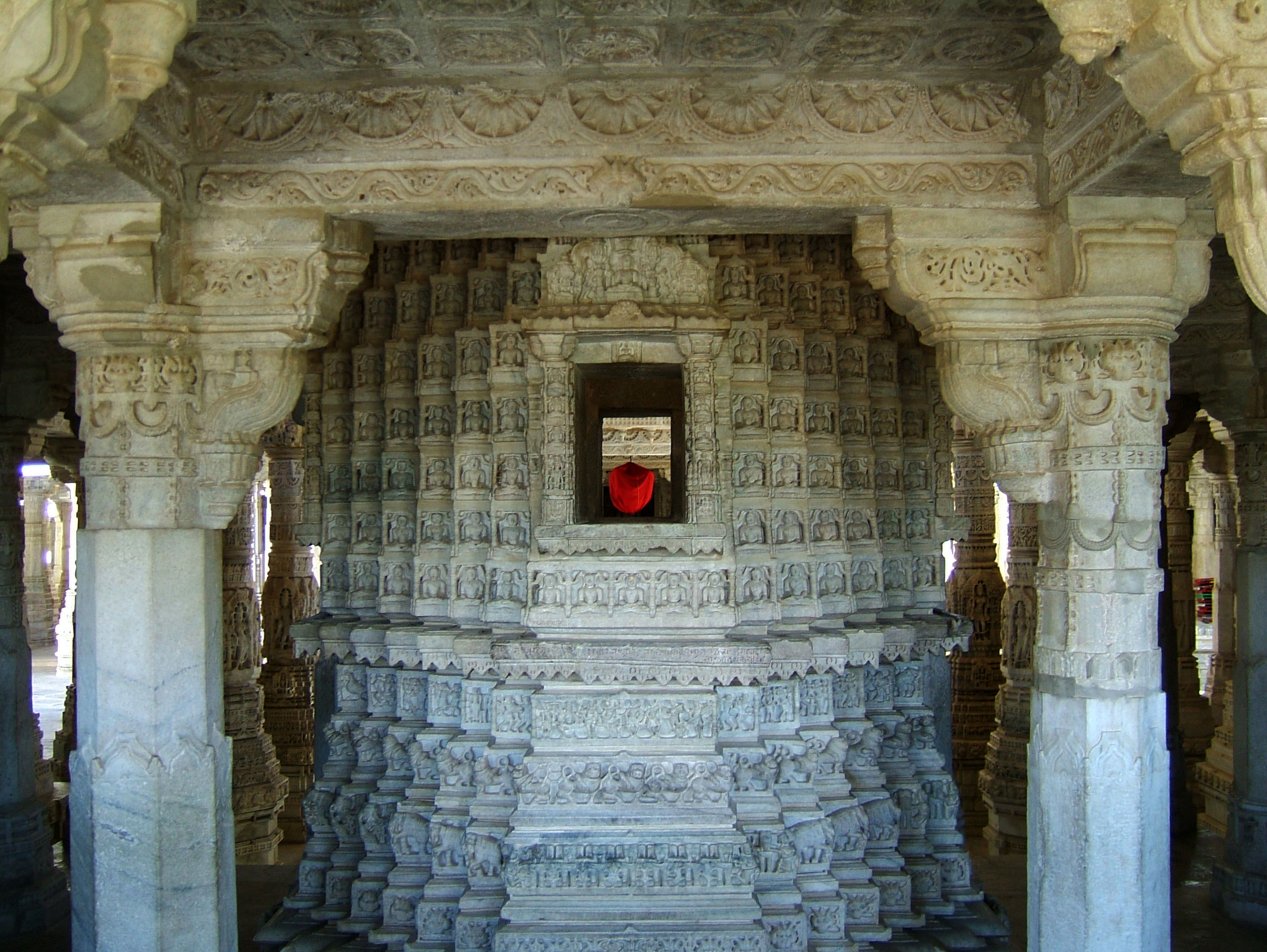
Jain Marble Temple main Shrine, Ranakpur.

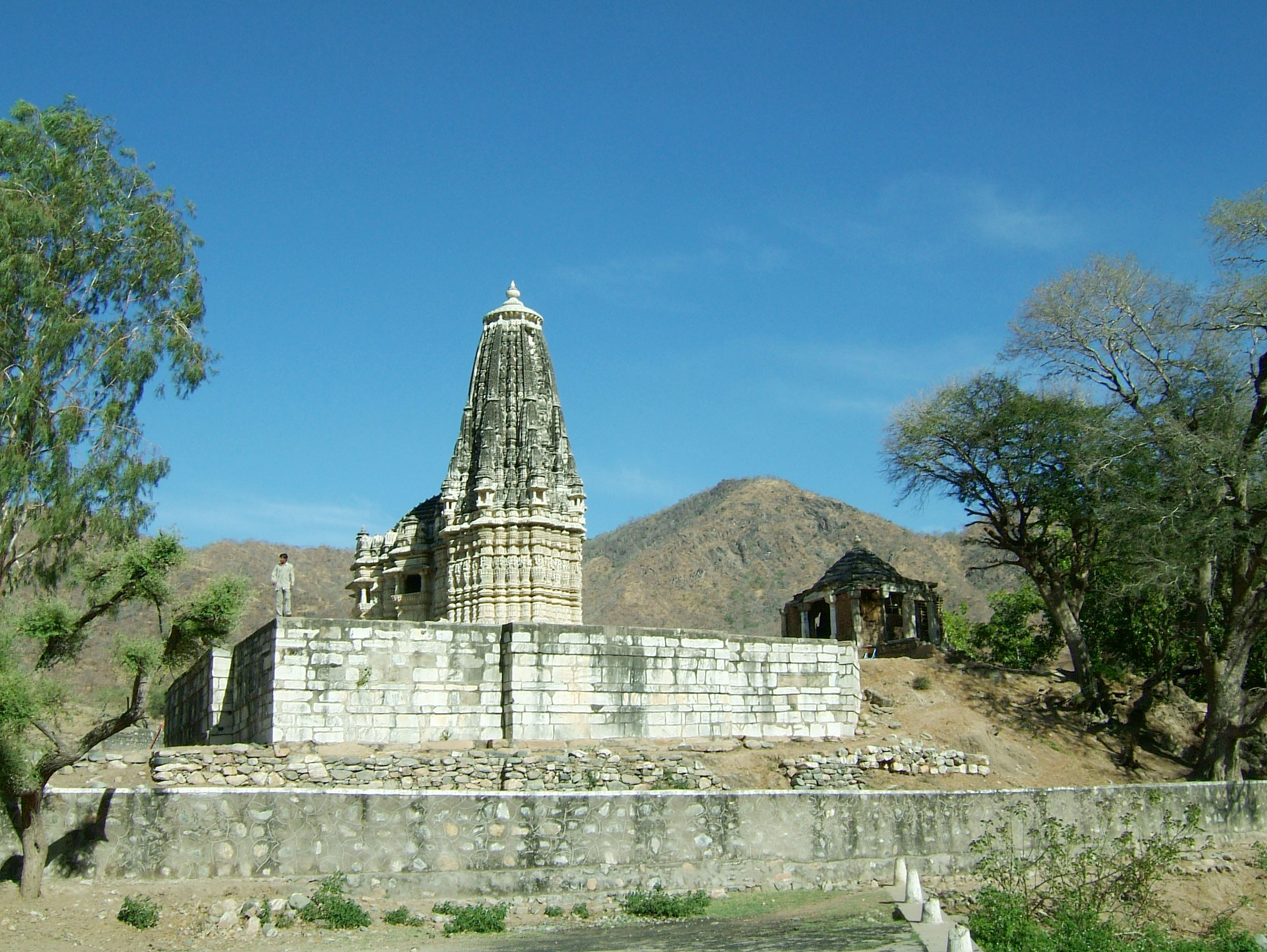
Sun Temple which is 300 meters to the side of the main marble temple, Ranakpur.

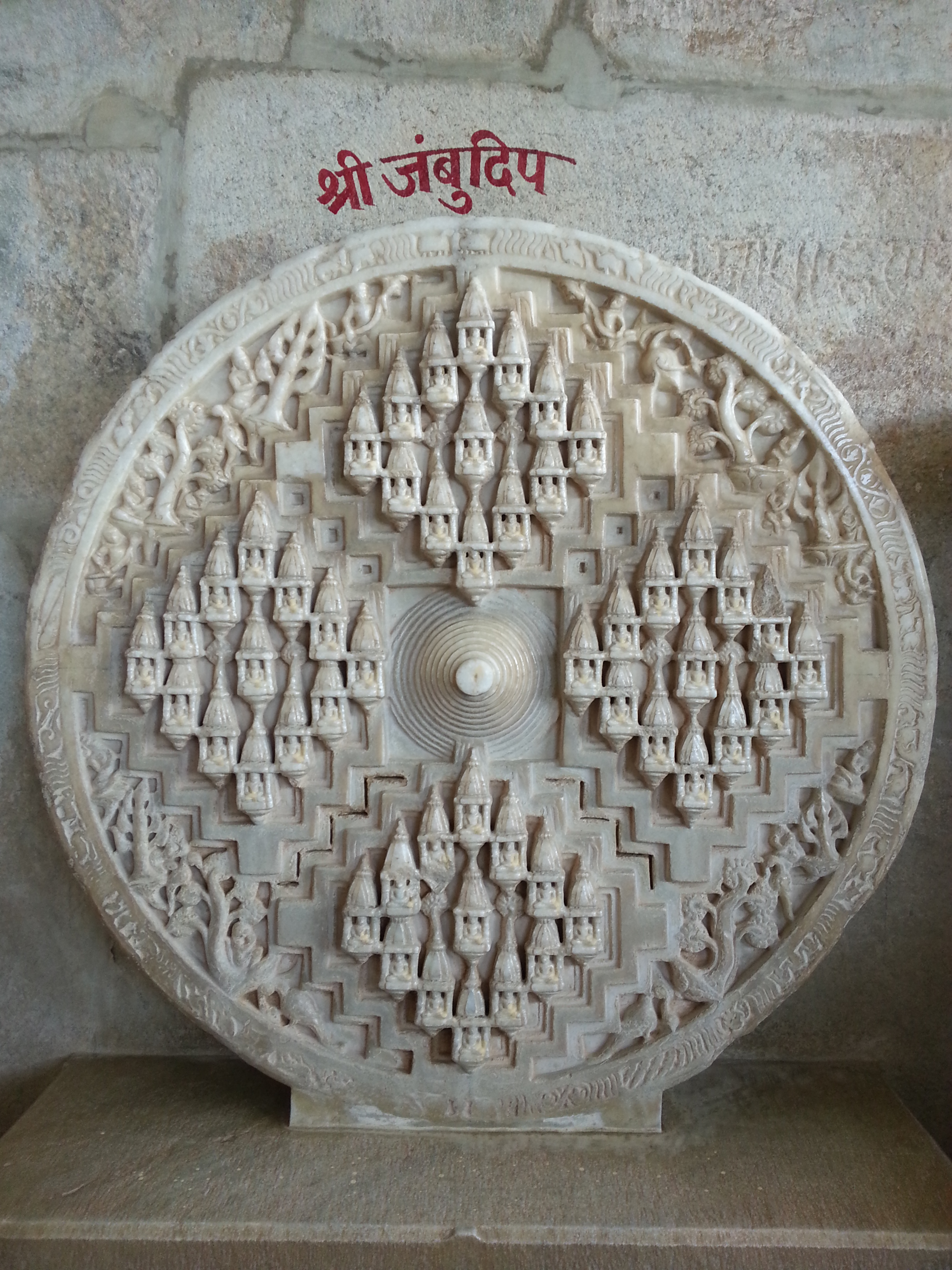
Depiction of JambuDweep जम्बुद्वीप

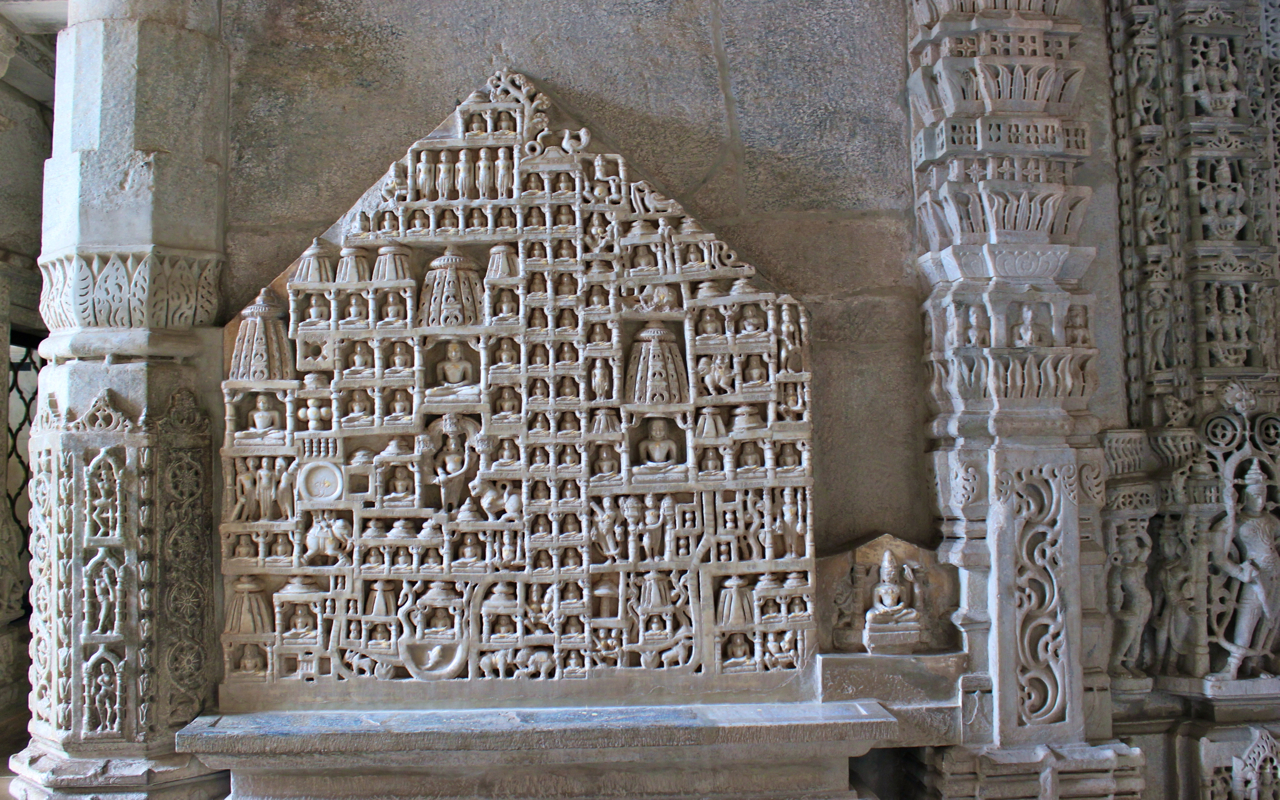
The iconic representation of Mt. Sahtrujava, where 863 Jain temples cluster near Palitana.

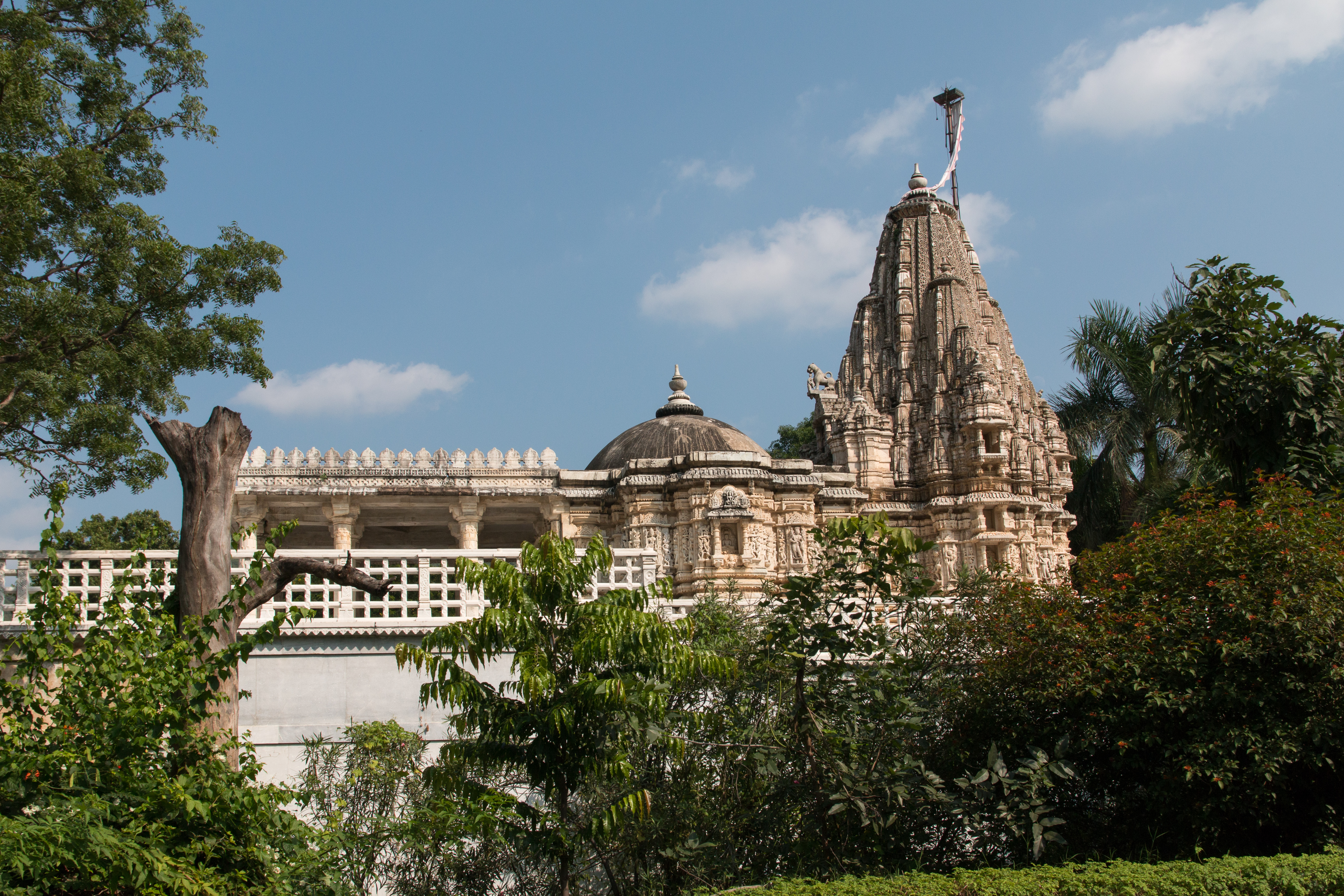
Suparshavanath Temple at Ranakpur ii

== See also ==
- Sadri
- Jain Temple
- List of Jain temples
- Jain art
