= Panch Padariya =

- village
- Location in Rajasthan, India Panch Padariya (India)
- Coordinates: 25.794°N 72.873°E
- Country: India
- State: Rajasthan
- District: Pali

Languages
  - Official: Hindi, Marwari language
- Time zone: UTC+5:30 (IST)
- Pin: 306421
- Telephone Code: +912932
- Vehicle registration: RJ-22

Panch Padariya is a small village in Rohat tehsil, Pali district of Rajasthan. It is connected to two major cities, Pali and Jodhpur, by road. In the 2011 census its population was reported as 1,751.
