= Sindarli =

Sindarli Hindarli, Sinderli
- Village
- Nickname: Analpillare
- Location in Rajasthan, India Sindarli (India)
- Coordinates: 25°14′50″N 73°25′00″E
- Country: India
- State: Rajasthan
- District: Pali
- Talukas: Desuri

Government
  - Body: Gram Panchayat

Area
  - Total: 2 km^{2} (0.77 sq mi)
- Elevation: 306.260 m (1,004.79 ft)

Population (2001)
  - Total: 2,171
  - Density: 1,100/km^{2} (2,800/sq mi)

Languages
  - Official: Hindi Marwari
- Time zone: UTC+5:30 (IST)
- PIN: 306702
- Telephone code: 02934
- ISO 3166 code: RJ-IN
- Vehicle registration: RJ22
- Nearest city: Sadri
- Lok Sabha constituency: Pali
- Vidhan Sabha constituency: Bali
- Civic agency: Gram Panchayat
- Climate: summer (Köppen)

Sindarli is a village in the Pali district of Rajasthan state. Previously it was Thikana of Mertiya Rathores in Marwar State. It is about 10 kilometres (6.2 mi) from the town of Sadri, 16 kilometres (9.9 mi) from Nadol, 23 kilometres (14 mi) from the tehsil office in Desuri and 70 kilometres (43 mi) from the district capital. Sindarli is also known as Sinderli or, in the local language, Hindarli.

== Demographics ==
Sindarli has a population of about 2,171 people living in about 424 households. It's a village with 100% Hindu population.

== Politics ==
Many people from Sindarli have had roles in area politics. Thakur Sajjan Singh Sindarli was MLA in 1972 from Sumerpur constituency., Pradhan 2 Times From Desuri Panchyat Samiti and Jila Pramukh from Pali District and Thakur Nathu Singh Mertiya was ex-pradhan from Desuri panchayat.

As of 2015 Pinku (Nirmal) Kanwar Mertiya is sarpanch of sindarli and Manohar Singh Mertiya is Upp sarpanch of sindarli gram panchyat.

== Famous people ==
- Sajjan Singh Sindarli - Sajjan Singh ji was the son of Thakur Madho Singh ji. He was twice MLA, once pradhan and ex Jila Pramukh of Pali dist.
- Seth Chandulal Ji Rajpurohit - Chandulalji Rajpurohit was Nagar Seth. His father Jayram had a business in South Africa.
