= Pali Marwar railway station =

Railway station in Rajasthan, India

General information
- Location: NH 65, Pali Marwar, Rajasthan; India
- Coordinates: 25.7910°N 73.3277°E
- Elevation: 221 metres (725 ft)
- System: Indian Railways station
- Owner: Indian Railways
- Operator: North Western Railway
- Platforms: 2
- Tracks: 3
- Connections: Auto stand

Construction
- Structure type: Standard (on-ground station)
- Parking: Yes
- Cycle facilities: No

Other information
- Status: Functioning
- Station code: PMY
- Zone(s): North Western Railway
- Division(s): Jodhpur
Location

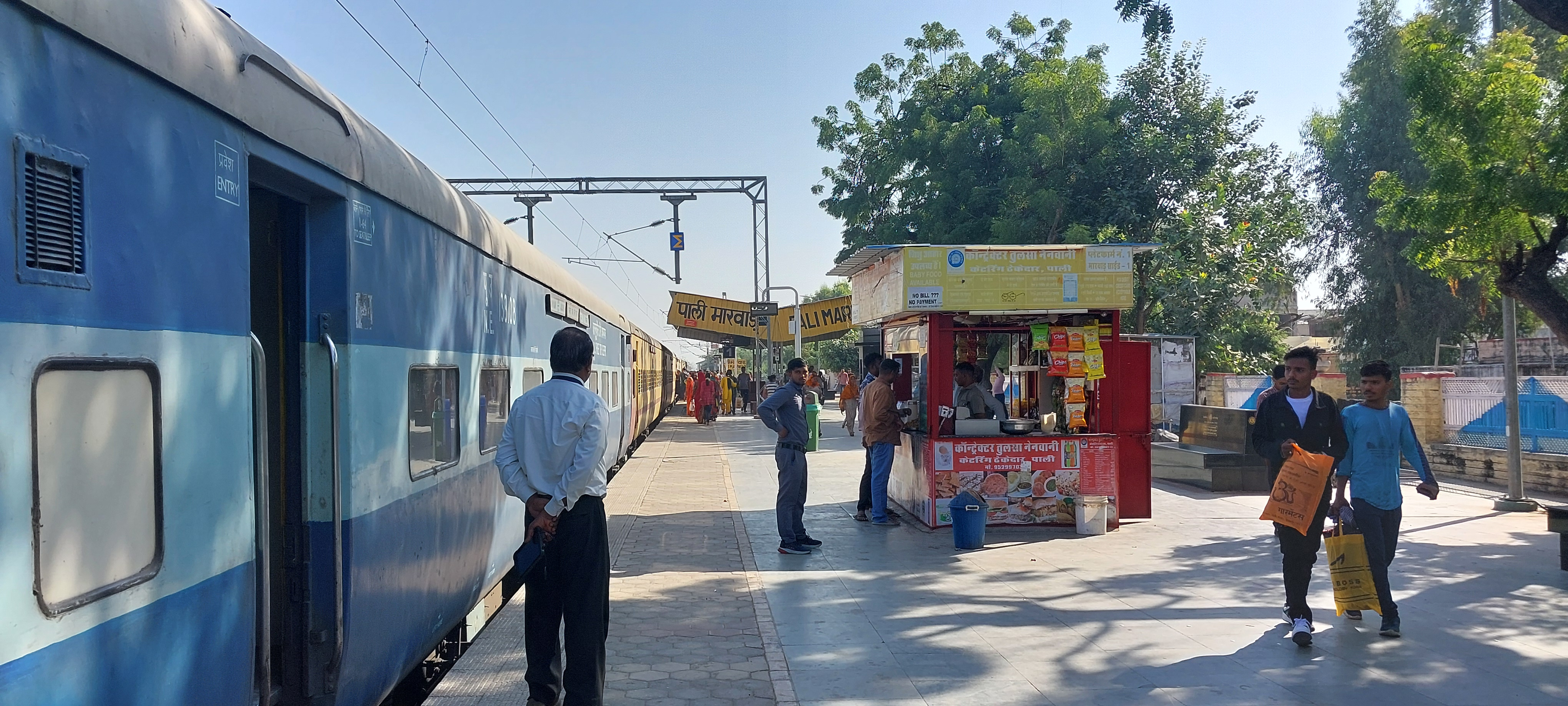
Pali Marwar railway station, Rajasthan

Pali Marwar railway station is a railway station in Pali district, Rajasthan. Its code is PMY. It serves Pali Marwar city. The station consists of two platforms.

Pali got connected to Marwar Junction railway station on 24 June 1882 and to Luni on 17 June 1884. Jodhpur is connected to the district via Luni in 1885 in Rajputana–Malwa Railway network and the first train started on this route on 9 March 1885. This line later becomes part of the Jodhpur–Bikaner Railway.

Transport

Direct trains are available on a daily basis to Mumbai, Ahmedabad, Vadodara, Surat, Indore, Jammu, Delhi, Jaipur (Ranikhet express), Gurgaon, Uttarkhand, Jalandhar, Bhatinda, Dadar, Abu road, Alwar, Jodhpur, Ajmer, Nagaur, Bikaner, Bhilwara, Beawar, Hanumangarh, Churu, Rani, Falna, Rohat, Luni and weekly basis to Pune, Lonavala, Chennai, Vijayawada, Warangal, Coimbatore, Jaisalmer, Pokran, Warangal.

Nearby Railway Station

- Marwar Jn (MJ) railway station
- Falna (FA) railway station
- Rani (Rani) railway station
- Jawai Bandh (JWB) railway station
- Sojat Road (SOD) railway station
- Sendra (SEU) railway station
- Haripur (HP) railway station
- Nana (NANA) railway station
- Somesar (SOS) railway station
