= Nimbo Ka Nath Mahadev Temple =

Shiva temple in Rajasthan, India

Religion
- Affiliation: Hinduism
- District: Pali District
- Deity: Shiva

Location
- Location: Pali district, Rajasthan, India
- State: Rajasthan
- Country: India

The Nimbo Ka Nath Mahadev temple, also known as the Nimbeshwar Mahadev Mandir, is a temple located in the Pali district of Rajasthan. It is dedicated to Lord Shiva and attracts many devotees all year round. It is a major spiritual center for Pali's people and Lord Shiva devotees in Pali. Nimbo Ka Nath is constructed on the site where, according to Hindu mythology, Kunti, mother of the Pandavas, worshiped the Hindu deity Shiva during a period of exile.

The temple is located between Falna and Sanderao and is a major part of the Pali city. There are many carvings on the temple walls and a hand-crafted idol of Lord Shiva inside the temple.

== Fairs ==
Every year on the eve of Shivaratri and Baisakhi Purnima, fairs are organized which are attended by thousands of people around the city. During this time the temple is adorned with a new look. Many people visit the temple during this fair and seek blessings from the deity.
