= Khinwara =

- Village
- Interactive map of Khinwara
- Coordinates: 25°29′18″N 73°35′53″E
- Country: India
- State: Rajasthan
- District: Pali District
- Tehsil: Rani Station
- Nearest city: Sadri

Government
  - Sarpanch: Shripal Vaishnav
  - Parliament constituency: Pali
  - Assembly constituency: Marwar Junction
  - Civic agency: Gram Panchayat
- PIN: 306502
- Website: www.bhikaramdewasi.com

Khinwara is a town in Rani tehsil, Pali District, Rajasthan, India. It is located on the Western Railways Ahmedabad to Delhi rail line, between Rani and Marwar Junction stations. It does not have a station. It is very close (approximately 30 minutes travel) to Marwar Junction, which is one of the way to go Khinwara. It has a bus stand and one government-run higher secondary school.
