= Muchhal Mahavir Temple =

Śvetāmbara Jain Temple in Rajasthan, India

Religion
- Affiliation: Jainism
- Sect: Śvetāmbara
- Deity: Mahavir
- Festival: Mahavir Janma Kalyanak
- Governing body: Anandji Kalyanji Trust

Location
- Location: Ghanerao, Pali, Rajasthan
- Interactive map of Muchhal Mahavir Temple
- Coordinates: 25°11′46.5″N 73°33′33.2″E

Architecture
- Style: Nagara architecture
- Established: 10th Century
- Temple: 1

Muchhal Mahavir temple is a Śvetāmbara Jain temple dedicated to Lord Mahavir, at Ghanerao, in Pali district in Rajasthan state in India. The place is on the route from Falna to Kumbhalgarh. The fair is held here every year on the thirteenth day of the month of Chaitra.

Muchhal Mahavir temple along with Ranakpur, Narlai, Nadol and Varkana forms "Gorwad Panch Tirth".

== Jain legend ==
According to Jain legends, Rana Raj Singh I of Mewar once visited this temple to offer prayer. He noticed a white hair while putting saffron to the idol. Upon question about the hair, the temple priest replied that the hair was from the moustaches of Lord Mahavira. Following, this Rana insisted to see moustache. The temple priest fasted for three days and pleased with this the protecting deity showed moustache on the face of the idol. When Rana uprooted the moustache, milk oozed out of the spot. Following this Rana became a staunch devotee of the Mahavira and the idol was named Muchhala Mahavir, or the Mahavir who had a moustache.

== Architecture ==
The temple is built in Nagara architecture. The temple is a curviliean superstructure decorated with multiple turrets and decorated pillars. The entrance of the temple has an intricately carved torana and outside the door of the temple are two large black colored idols of elephant on each side. The temple is famous for detailed cavings. The temple also has a dharamshala equipped with all modern facilities and bhojnalaya.

== See also ==
- Ranakpur Jain temple
- Dilwara temples
