= Biroliya railway station =

Railway station in Rajasthan, India

Biroliya

General information
- Location: Falna Road, Biroliya, Pali district, Rajasthan; India
- Coordinates: 25°10′14″N 73°11′33″E
- Elevation: 296 metres (971 ft)
- System: Indian Railways station
- Owner: Indian Railways
- Operator: North Western Railway
- Line: Ahmedabad–Jaipur line
- Platforms: 2
- Tracks: Double Electric-Line

Construction
- Structure type: Standard (on ground)

Other information
- Status: Functioning
- Station code: BRLY
- Zone(s): North Western Railway zone
- Division(s): Ajmer

Services
Preceding station	Indian Railways	Following station
falna towards ?	North Western Railway zone Ahmedabad–Jaipur line	Sumerpur Jawai Bandh towards ?
Location
- Interactive map

Biroliya railway station is a railway station in located on Ahmedabad–Jaipur railway line operated by the North Western Railway under Ajmer railway division. It is situated beside Falna Road at Biroliya in Pali district in the Indian state of Rajasthan.
