= Meena Vala, Rajpura =

Village in Rajasthan, India

Meena Vala is a village near Rajpura, Pali district, Rajasthan.
