= Sajjan Singh Sindarli =

Indian politician

Sajjan Singh Sindarli was an Indian politician who was a member of the Rajasthan Legislative Assembly elected from Sumerpur (Rajasthan Assembly constituency) 1972 to 1977 in Pali district in Rajasthan state. He was elected to assembly in 1972 from Sumerpur constituency. He was elected on ticket of the Bharatiya Janata Party. He was also elected as jilla pramukh from Pali on 1 March 1965 to 31 August 1977.

== Family ==
Sajjan singh born in Sindarli a mertiya rathore family.his father name was thakur madho singh mertiya before his thikana/jagir transfer to deoli village by jodhpur darbar.
