= PMY =

PMY or pmy may refer to:

- El Tehuelche Airport (IATA: PMY), an airport in Puerto Madryn, Chubut Province, Argentina
- Pali Marwar railway station (Indian Railways station code: PMY), a railway station in Rajasthan, India
- Papuan Malay (ISO 639-3: pmy), a Malay-based Creole language spoken in the Indonesian part of New Guinea
