= Rani railway station =

Railway Station in Rajasthan, India

General information
- Location: Rani, Rajasthan; India
- Coordinates: 25.3487°N 73.3109°E
- Elevation: 282 metres (925 ft)
- System: Indian Railways station
- Owner: Indian Railways
- Operator: North Western Railway
- Line: Jaipur–Ahmedabad line
- Platforms: 2
- Tracks: 4 (Construction – doubling of diesel + electrification 5 ft 6 in (1,676 mm) broad gauge)
- Connections: Auto-Taxi stand

Construction
- Structure type: Standard (on ground station)
- Parking: Yes
- Cycle facilities: Yes

Other information
- Status: Functioning
- Station code: RANI
- Zone(s): North Western Railway
- Division(s): Ajmer
Location

Rani railway station (रानी रेलवे स्टेशन) is a main railway station in Pali district, Rajasthan. Its code is RANI. It serves Rani town. The station consists of two platforms. The platforms are not fully well sheltered. Many facilities including ticket vending machine and sanitation. Rani station equipped with 20 kW solar power supply. Rani Railway station is a part of Delhi–Mumbai Dedicated Freight Corridor. Construction had already begun and completed within few years and will be electrified too.

== Major trains ==
Some of the important trains that runs from Rani are :

- 19412/19411 Intercity Express
- 19402/19401 Lucknow–Ahmedabad–Lucknow Weekly Express
- 19416/19415 Shri Mata Vaishno Devi Katra–Ahmedabad–Shri Mata Vaishno Devi Katra Express
- 54803/54804 Jodhpur–Ahmedabad–Jodhpur Passenger
- 54806/54805 Jaipur–Ahmedabad–Jaipur Passenger
- 19708/19707 Amarapur Aravali Express
- 18422/18421 Ajmer–Puri–Ajmer Bi-Weekly Express
- 14707/14708 Ranakpur Express
- 12479/12480 Suryanagari Superfast Express
- 19032/19031 Yoga Express
- 16588/16587 Bikaner–Yashvantpur–Bikaner Express
- 12990/12989 Ajmer–Dadar-Ajmer Superfast Express
- 22950/22949 Delhi Sarai Rohilla–Bandra Terminus-Delhi Sarai Rohilla Superfast Express
- 22932/22931 Jaisalmer–Bandra Terminus-–Jaisalmer Superfast Express
- 22916/22915 Hisar–Bandra Terminus–Hisar Weekly Superfast Express
