= Om Banna =

Indian Hindu deity

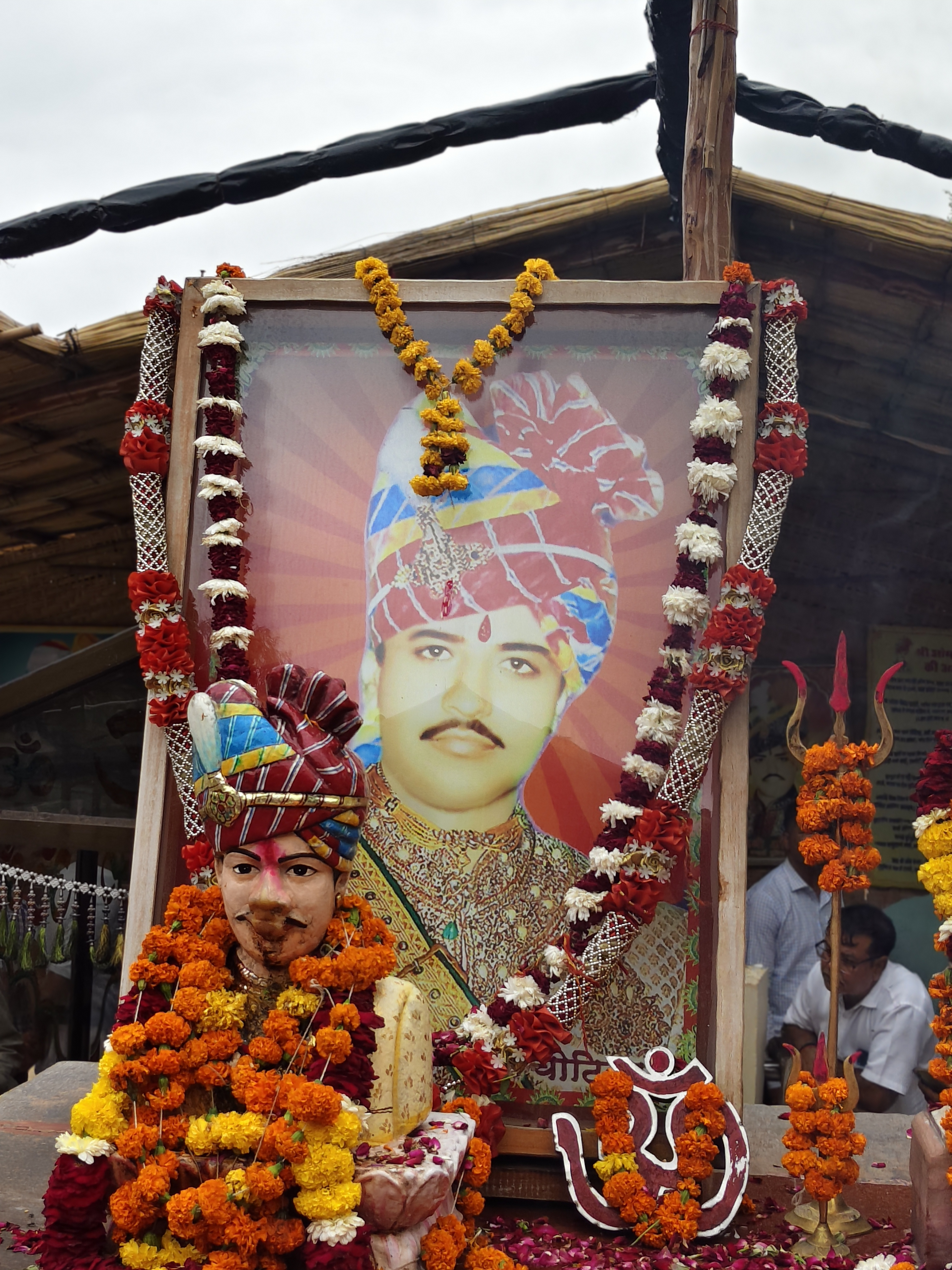
- Other names: Om Singh Rathore
- Devanagari: ओम बन्ना
- Abode: Chotila, Pali, Rajasthan
- Symbol: Om
- Mount: Royal Enfield Bullet

Genealogy
- Born: 1964; Chotila, Pali, Rajasthan, India)
- Died: 2 December 1988
- Parents: Jog Singh Rathore (father)
- Spouse: Urmila Kanwar

Om Singh Rathore (also called Shri Om Banna and Bullet Baba) is a folk deity, whose shrine and temple called Om Banna Dham is located in Pali district near Jodhpur, India, devoted to him and his motorcycle. It is located 20 kilometres (12 mi) from Pali and 53 kilometres (33 mi) away from Jodhpur on the Pali-Jodhpur highway, near Chotila village. The motorcycle is a 350cc Royal Enfield Bullet RNJ 7773.

Hundreds of devotees turn up every day to pray for a safe journey.

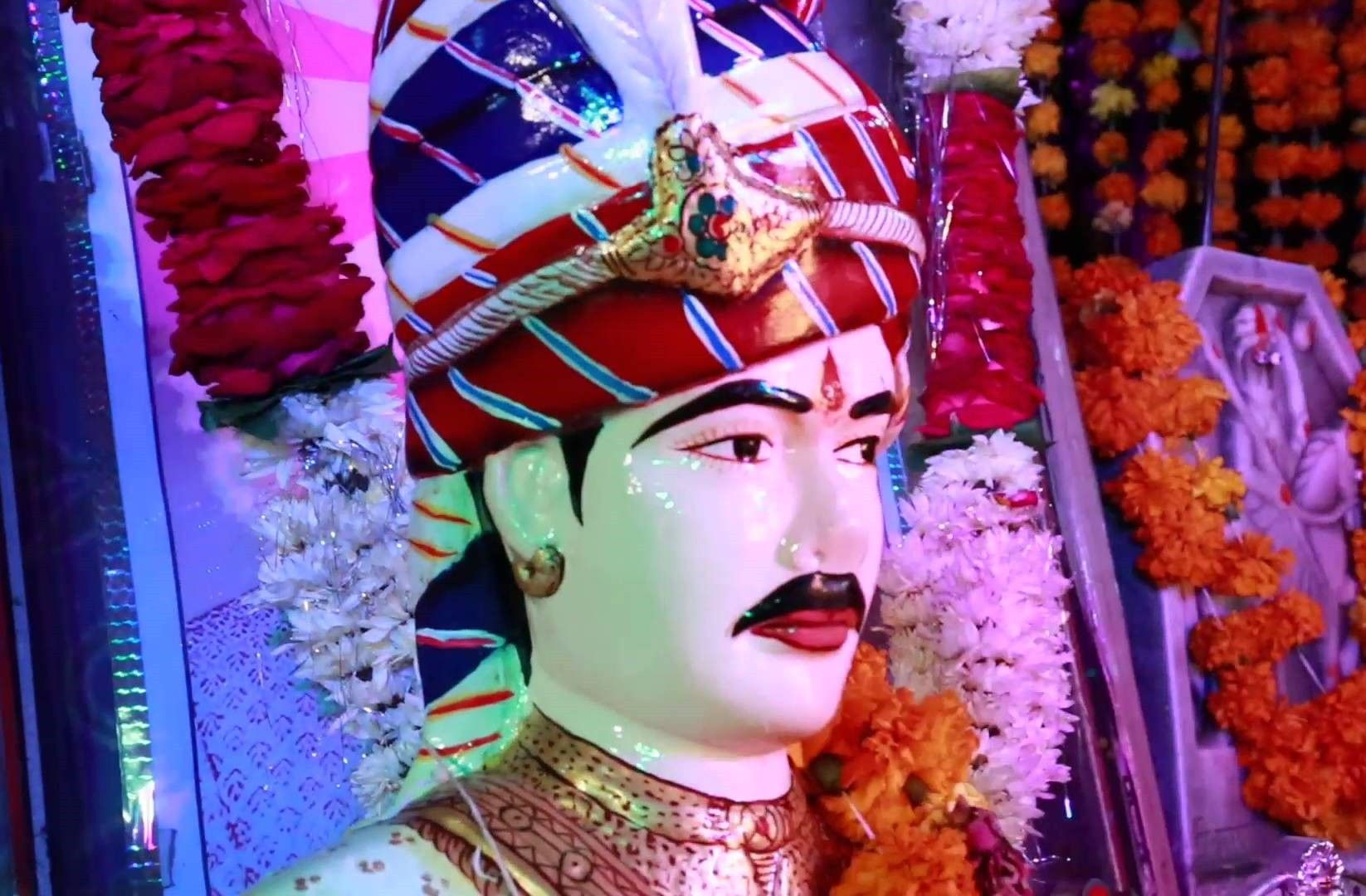
Idol of Om Banna in the temple.

== History ==
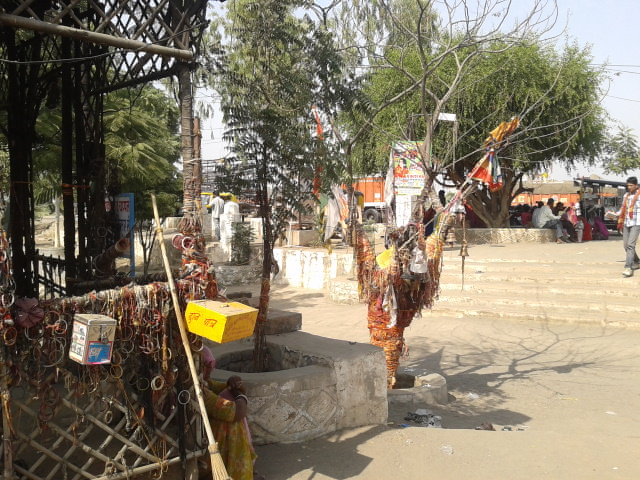
The tree that caused Om Banna's death remains ornamented with offering of bangles, scarves, etc.

Om Singh Rathore was born in Chotila to Jog Singh Rathore, the Thakur of the village. On 5 May 1988, Om Banna (formerly known as Om Singh Rathore; banna is an honorary word used for Rajput youth) was travelling from the town of Bangdi near Sanderao of Pali, to Chotila, when he lost control of his motorcycle and hit a tree. He died on spot whereas the motorcycle fell into a nearby ditch. The next morning after the accident, local police took the motorcycle to a nearby police station. The next day it was reported to have mysteriously disappeared from the station and was found back at the site of the incident. Police once again took the motorcycle, this time emptying its fuel tank and putting it under lock and key. Despite their efforts, the next morning it again disappeared and was found at the accident site. Legend says that the motorcycle kept returning to the same ditch. It thwarted every attempt by police to keep it at the local police station; the motorcycle always returned to the same spot before dawn.

This came to be seen as a miracle by local population, and they began to worship the "Bullet Bike." News of the miracle motorcycle spread to nearby villages, and later they built a temple to worship it. This temple is known as "Bullet Baba's Temple." It is believed that Om Banna's spirit helps the distressed travellers.

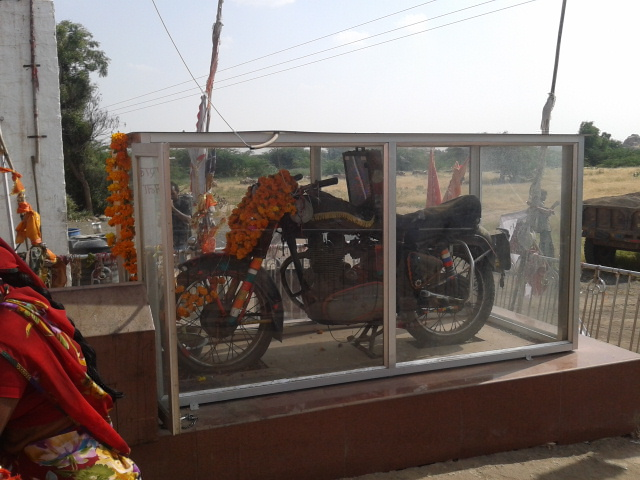
Om Banna's Bullet Bike (Bullet Banna)

== Worship ==
Every day nearby villagers and travellers stop and pray to the bike and its late owner Om Singh Rathore. Those who pass by stop to bow their heads leave offerings in honour of the helpful spirit, and some drivers also offer small bottles of alcohol at the site. It is said that a person who does not stop to pray at the shrine is in for a dangerous journey. Devotees also apply the 'tilak' mark and tie a red thread on the motorbike. Local people sing folk songs in the name of Om Banna.

Offerings include incense sticks, flowers, coconut, liquor, red thread and sweets. An eternal flame is kept at the shrine.
