= Rani, Rajasthan =

Rani
- Town
- Location in Rajasthan, India Rani (India)
- Coordinates: 25.37°N 73.3°E
- Country: India
- State: Rajasthan
- District: Pali

Government
  - Body: Rani Municipality, Rani Tehsil, Rani Panchayat Bhawan
- Elevation: 282 m (925 ft)

Population (2011)
  - Total: 13,880

Languages
  - Official: Hindi, Marwari
- Time zone: UTC+5:30 (IST)
- PIN: 306115
- Telephone code: 02934
- Vehicle registration: RJ-22
- Sex ratio: 1.06 ♂/♀
- Website: www.urban.rajasthan.gov.in

Rani is a town and municipality and tehsil headquarters in the Pali district in the Indian state of Rajasthan. It lies on the banks of the Sukri River (a seasonal river), a tributary of the Luni River. It's railway station is an important railway station on the Ahmedabad-Delhi railway line. Some nearby villages are Beejowa, Itendra, Medtian, etc.

Rani-Station is the nearest railhead to Shri Parswanath Jain Vidyalaya at Varkana and Shri Ashapura Mata Temple Nadol Kasuli. Some Jain temples are a thousand years old. The temples are at a distance of 7 km from Rani. In Rani itself, the Sai Dham Temple, and Shri Astapadh Jain Tirth are visitor attractions. Rani has many small-scale industries, & Late Shri Nathraj Hingarh was a pioneer in the progress of small-scale industries in Rani.

Around 1940 Rani initially was the only Railway station on the Bombay Baroda Central Indian Railway (BB&CI).

There is a local god named 'Mamaji.' It is said that he didn't allow the Britishers to lay track on his temple area.

== Geography ==
Rani is located at 25.37°N 73.3°E. It has an average elevation of 273 metres (895 feet).

Rani is divided into two parts—Rani station and Rani village.

Rani village is about 3 km from Rani station. It is a small village with a fort.

Rani station is also divided into two parts by a railway line—the eastern area is called "main market" or "Mahaveer Bazaar" and is known for shopping- like saris & dress materials, jewellery shop, and kirana shop. The western area is called "pratap bazaar" is always busy for buses, taxis, transport, trade, and industrial work. Rani station has a large industrial area. It is known for its marbles, -stones, and agriculture industry in the Pali district. The iron industry is widespread in this area, and is involved in making construction steel and agricultural implements like powrahs/spades. Rani-stations Sweets, Kachoris, Stones, Saris are, Rani Station is a Tehsil in the Pali District of Rajasthan State, India. Rani Station Tehsil Headquarters is Rani Station town. It belongs to Jodhpur Division. It is located 55 km to the south of District headquarters Pali. 356 km from State capital Jaipur to the east.

Rani Station Tehsil is bounded by Bali Tehsil to the south, Desuri Tehsil to the east, Sumerpur Tehsil to the west. Falna, Bali, Sadri, Sumerpur are the nearby cities to Rani Station.

It is in the 280 m elevation(altitude) .

Ranakpur, Kumbhalgarh (Kumbhalmer), Sirohi, Nathdwara, Jalore are the nearby important tourist destinations to see.

== Leisure ==
There are also a few picnic points, such as Sai Dham and Gori-shankar, around Rani. There is a mosque also situated there. There are large green grounds and high mountains like Rani village, Khimel, Dadai, Ghuralas etc. Basa Naiti Nora, for marriage functions with latest amenities is good stay. Ashapura mataji Temple Situated at Dadai Village on Hill nr about 12 km from Rani.

== Demographics ==
As of 2011 India census, the urban agglomeration of Rani had a population of 13880 in 2,292 households. The municipality had a sex ratio of 941 females per 1,000 males. Rani has an average literacy rate of 71.13%. Male literacy is 80.6%, and female literacy is 61.19%. In Rani, 12.35% of the population is under 6 years of age.

Migration of Hingarhs was followed, in descending order, by the following families Dhokas, Rathores, Punmiyas, Semlanis, Parmaars, the Rankas from Sadri, Palrechas, and Baldotas. Of late, Chunnilalji Mehta migrated from Khimel and other recent migrants are not more than 40 years old. After Hingarh's giant presence, Dhoka's own good property in Rani-Station at Dhoka Gali & majority of dhokas are today in south India.

Currently many families stay here e.g. - Jain, Suthar, Malviya, Mali, Ganchi, Choudhary, Vaishnav, Brahmins, Sewag, Kchatriya etc. and doing business over all the India and abroad.

== Education ==
Rani is an education centre of surrounding area. Rani has about many primary schools, 4 higher secondary schools and a college. Rani college (named L.P.S. girls college, Vidhyawadi) is one of the well known girls colleges in Gorwar. Vidhyawari is situated on Khimawat road and about 3 km. far from Rani station. It is a girls education centre having school, college, labs, library, hostels and school bus facilities. Private schools of the city include Tiny Tots Public Senior Secondary School (Arts & Commerce), Mahaveer senior sec. school(science) Sanatan Dharma sec. school, Ox-ford, Adarsh vidhya mandir, Deo public school, Emmanual schools etc.
