= Muchhal =

Muchhal may refer to

- Palak Muchhal (born 1992), Indian playback singer
- Palash Muchhal (born 1995), Indian music composer, brother of Palak
- Muchhal Mahavir Temple, in Pali district, Rajasthan, India
- Muchhal Village, in Amritsar district, Punjab, India
