= Chamunderi Ranawatan =

Village in Pali district, Rajasthan, India

Chamundery Ranawatan is a large village located in Bali of Pali district, Rajasthan with total 1616 families residing. The Chamunderi Rana Watan village has population of 7854 of which 4007 are males while 3847 are females as per Population Census 2011.

In Chamundery Ranawatan village population of children with age 0-6 is 1057 which makes up 13.46% of total population of village. Average Sex Ratio of Chamundery Ranawatan village is 960 which is higher than Rajasthan state average of 928. Child Sex Ratio for the Chamundery Ranawatan as per census is 891, higher than Rajasthan average of 888.

Chamundery Ranawatan village has higher literacy rate compared to Rajasthan. In 2011, literacy rate of Chamundery Ranawatan village was 67.71% compared to 66.11% of Rajasthan. In Chamundery Ranawatan Male literacy stands at 81.58% while female literacy rate was 53.42%.

As per constitution of India and Panchyati Raaj Act, Chamundery Ranawatan village is administrated by Sarpanch (Head of Village) who is elected representative of village. Results based on 2011 census.

== Labour ==
In Chamunderi Rana Watan village out of total population, 2574 were engaged in work activities. 69.43% of workers describe their work as Main Work (Employment or Earning more than 6 Months) while 30.57% were involved in Marginal activity providing livelihood for less than 6 months. Of 2574 workers engaged in Main Work, 431 were cultivators (owner or co-owner) while 173 were Agricultural labourer.

Particulars	Total	Male	Female	Total No. of Houses	1,616	-	-
Population	7,854	4,007	3,847
Child (0–6)	1,057	559	498
Schedule Caste	1,654	848	806
Schedule Tribe	500	258	242
Literacy	67.71%	81.58%	53.42%
Total Workers	2,574	2,032	542
Main Worker	1,787	0	0
Marginal Worker	787	523	264

== Caste demographics ==
Scheduled Caste (SC) constitutes 21.06% while Scheduled Tribe (ST) were 6.37% of total population in Chamunderi Rana Watan village.
