= Gorwar =

Region of Rajasthan, India

Historical Region of North India; Godwar (गोड़वाड़)
Location	southern-western Rajasthan
State established:	early 10th century
Language	Godwari (Marwari / Mewari / Rajasthani)
Dynasties	Gaur dynasty and Chauhan's of Nadol (950–1197) Parmar (till 97); Deora Chauhan and Gaur dynasty(1315–1949)
Historical capitals	Nadol, Chandravati, Sirohi

Godwad or Godwar, (in different periods also called Chandravati Kingdom, Sirohi State) is a region of Rajasthan state in India, which lies in the southwest of Rajasthan and borders the state of Gujarat.

== Geography ==
Gorwar stretches along the edge of the Aravalli Hills and is bounded by Mewar in the south-east and Gujarat in the south-west. It covers the region of Jalore, Sirohi and the southern portion of Pali district of Rajasthan. Jawai Bandh, Bali, Falna, Rani, Abu Road, Sanderao and Sirohi are the main towns of the region.

The Sukri river and its tributaries flows through this region and flows in the west direction to join the Luni River before it evacuates into the Rann of Kutch. The West Banas River drains the southeastern part of the region.

The region has an arid semi-desert climate and falls under the category of the Northwestern thorn scrub forests eco-region. The western part of the Jalore district has a desert landscape as it falls in the Thar Desert and has a desert landscape complete with sand dunes.

== History ==
Earlier, it was known as the kingdom of the Gaur dynasty, who once controlled the entire region. From the early 10th century, the region was ruled by the Paramaras of Abu from their capital at Chandravati. The first Paramara ruler of the area was Sindhuraja.

In 1024, the kingdom was attacked and plundered by Mahmud Ghazni, when he passed through Rajasthan to attack Anhilwada. After defeating Prithviraj Chauhan III in 1192, the Muslim Army also attacked Chandravati. In 1197 Qutubuddin Aibak General Khusrav defeated its king Dharavarsha near the foothills of Mount Abu.

In about 1315 the region passed into the hands of Deoras, a branch of the Chauhan clan of Rajputs. Deoraj, founder of the dynasty, claimed descent from Prithviraj Chauhan III, the last Hindu ruler of Delhi. In 1405, Rao Sobhaji (6th in descent from Rao Deoraj) founded the town of Shivpuri on the western slope of Siranwa Hill. Shivpuri today lies in ruins. In 1425, his son and successor, Sehastramal (or Sahastramal, Sehastramal), founded a fortress on the eastern slope of the same hill, which became his capital and grew into the present-day town of Sirohi. The capital was shifted to Sirohi around 1450.

During the early years of the 19th century,the Sirohi Kingdom suffered much from wars with Jodhpur and the Meena hill tribes of the area. The protection of the British was sought in 1817; the pretensions of Jodhpur to suzerainty over Sirohi were disallowed, and in 1823 a treaty was concluded with the British government. Sirohi became a self-governing princely state within British India, and part of the Rajputana Agency.

For services rendered during the Revolt of 1857, the Rao received a remission of half his tribute. The state was traversed by the Rajputana Railway in the 19th century, and a station was built at Abu Road, 28 miles south of the town of Sirohi. Rao Keshri Singh (ruled 1875-1920) and his successors were granted the title Maharao (equivalent to Maharaja) in 1889.

== Demographics ==
The area of the state was 5,087 km^{2} (1,964 sq mi) and its population was 154,544 in 1901. The population of the town of Sirohi that year was 5651. These figures represented a decrease of 17% from the figures that were obtained in the previous census of 1891; this was presumably the result of the famine that stalked the land for much of that decade.

== Economy ==
The state manufactured sword-blades and other weapons, but little else. In 1901 the gross revenue of the state was approximately Rs 28,000, and the tribute to the British Raj was set at a mere Rs 450. The Crosthwaite Hospital was opened by Sir Robert Crosthwaite in December 1897.

The Sirohi state joined India after its independence and became the part of the Rajasthan state in 1960.

In the 21st century Godwad or Godwar is undergoing development, the cement factories, highways, tourism and agriculture. The natives of the Land of the Gods, Godwad have stretched across the country for business. Shepard like the Rabari has travelled Madhya Pradesh and beyond trading. The business class that's crossed borders and gone to Mumbai, Hyderabad and beyond. The farmer has started to save wildlife. The area of Jawai Bandh, Nana, Chamunderi, Bhandar, Velar, Virampura, Kotar, Bera and Sheoganj. The native and local people have taken tourism as a weapon to save Godwar Wildlife. The Jawai Bandh Leopard Conservation Reserve is home to several upcoming hotels, and an issue which is a must to be addressed, as Godwar is the last green western frontier of India. This increase in hotels demand requires responsible handling, as Godwad Bagheera Country must strive to be a Sustainable Destination.

Currently, the new Rajasthan government policies and road and railway connectivity have turned Abu Road into a major Industrial city and financial hub of the region.

Now this area is well known for leopard safari, crocodile, and many migratory birds visit Jawai Dam in winters and there are many other activities operated for tourists in this area. Some people also call it "the untouched beauty of Rajasthan"

== Issues ==
- Endangered wildlife
- Jawai Bandh dry, drought years (2012, 2013)
- Increase in industries, population, tourism, mining and deforestation
- Education

== See also ==
  - Gaur dynasty
