= Hemawas =

- rural
- Interactive map of Hemawas
- Coordinates: 25.7°N 73.333°E
- Country: India
- State: Rajasthan
- District: Pali
- Talukas: Pali

Government
  - Body: Gram Panchayat
- Elevation: 217 m (712 ft)

Population (2011)
  - Total: 4,012

Languages
  - Official: Marwari, Hindi
- Time zone: UTC+5:30 (IST)
- PIN: 306401
- Telephone code: 02932
- ISO 3166 code: RJ-IN
- Vehicle registration: RJ-22
- Lok Sabha constituency: Pali (Lok Sabha constituency)
- Vidhan Sabha constituency: Pali
- Civic agency: Gram Panchayat
- Avg. annual temperature: 30 °C (86 °F)
- Avg. summer temperature: 44 °C (111 °F)
- Avg. winter temperature: 05 °C (41 °F)

Hemawas is a village in Pali tehsil of Pali district in Rajasthan state of India. It is located to the immediate south of the city of Pali. The nearby Hemawas Dam, completed in 1911, lies on the Bandi river.

== Demographics ==
The population of Hemawas is 4,012 according to the 2011 census, with a male population of 2,061 and a female population of 1,951.
