= Narlai =

- village
- Location in Rajasthan, India Narlai (India)
- Coordinates: 25.3167°N 73.5333°E
- Country: India
- State: Rajasthan
- District: Pali
- Talukas: Desuri

Government
  - Body: Gram Panchayat
- Elevation: 356 m (1,168 ft)

Population (2001)
  - Total: 6,190

Languages
  - Official: Hindi, Marwari
- Time zone: UTC+5:30 (IST)
- PIN: 306703
- Telephone code: 02934
- Vehicle registration: RJ-22
- Sex ratio: 1085 ♂/♀
- Lok Sabha constituency: Pali (Lok Sabha Constituency)
- Vidhan Sabha constituency: Bali
- Civic agency: Gram Panchayat
- Avg. annual temperature: 30 °C (86 °F)
- Avg. summer temperature: 44 °C (111 °F)
- Avg. winter temperature: 05 °C (41 °F)

Narlai is a village in Desuri tehsil of Pali district in Rajasthan state in India. According to the 2001 Census of India, Narlai has a population of 6,190: 2,968 men and 3,222 women.

In old times, Narlai had over 100 temples. Currently, there are 22 beautifully carved temples which are open to visitors. Narlai has a granite monolith hill, known as Jaikal Hill, which offers a lovely view of the Godwar area after a climb of over 700 steps. The hill includes a few hundred meter long cave, which contains a Shiva temple.

Rawla Narlai, is a 17th-century palace in Narlai, now converted to a heritage hotel.

== History ==
Narlai is identified with the place called Nāḍūlaḍāgikā mentioned in two Chāhamāna-era inscriptions, one from 1138 and the other from 1145. This indicates that Narlai functioned as a commercial centre during that period, and there is mention of some sort of fee being levied on bulls laden with merchants' goods. During this period, Narlai was part of a cluster of trade centres under Chāhamāna rule in what is now south-central Rajasthan. The others known from contemporary sources were Nadol, Dhalopa, Sevadi, and Badari.

On 15 June 1680, Tahawwur Khan, Aurangzeb's general, was defeated here by the combined force of Rathores and Sisodia Rajputs.
