= Raipur, Rajasthan =

History

Raipur
- rural
- Location in Rajasthan, India Raipur (India) Raipur (Asia)
- Coordinates: 26.05°N 74.02°E
- Country: India
- State: Rajasthan
- District: Beawar
- Talukas: Raipur

Government
  - Body: Raipur Gram Panchayat

Population (2011)
  - Total: 12,157

Languages
  - Official: Hindi, Marwari
- Time zone: UTC+5:30 (IST)
- PIN: 306304
- Telephone code: 02937
- ISO 3166 code: RJ-IN
- Vehicle registration: RJ-22
- Sex ratio: 964 ♂/♀
- Lok Sabha constituency: Pali
- Vidhan Sabha constituency: Raipur
- Civic agency: Raipur Gram Panchayat
- Avg. annual temperature: 30 °C (86 °F)
- Avg. summer temperature: 44 °C (111 °F)
- Avg. winter temperature: 05 °C (41 °F)

Raipur is a village in the Beawar district of the Indian state of Rajasthan, as well as the Tehsil headquarters. It is situated on the banks of the Luni river, and is locally famous for its Ganesha temple. Raipur (often called Raipur Marwar) in Rajasthan is a historic town and former feudal estate (thikana) founded in 1606 AD by the Udawat Clan of the Rathore Dynasty

== Demographics ==
The population of Raipur is 14,136 according to the 2001 census, with 7,198 males compared to 6,938 females. Raipur is situated on Ahmedabad-Delhi national highway. Raipur has many historical places which have become a center of attraction for tourists.
