= Punariya =

Village in Rajasthan, India

Punariya is a village located in Bali Tehsil of Pali district, India, has population of 971 of which 477 are males while 494 are females as per Population Census 2011.
