= Marwar Junction =

Marwar junction
- City
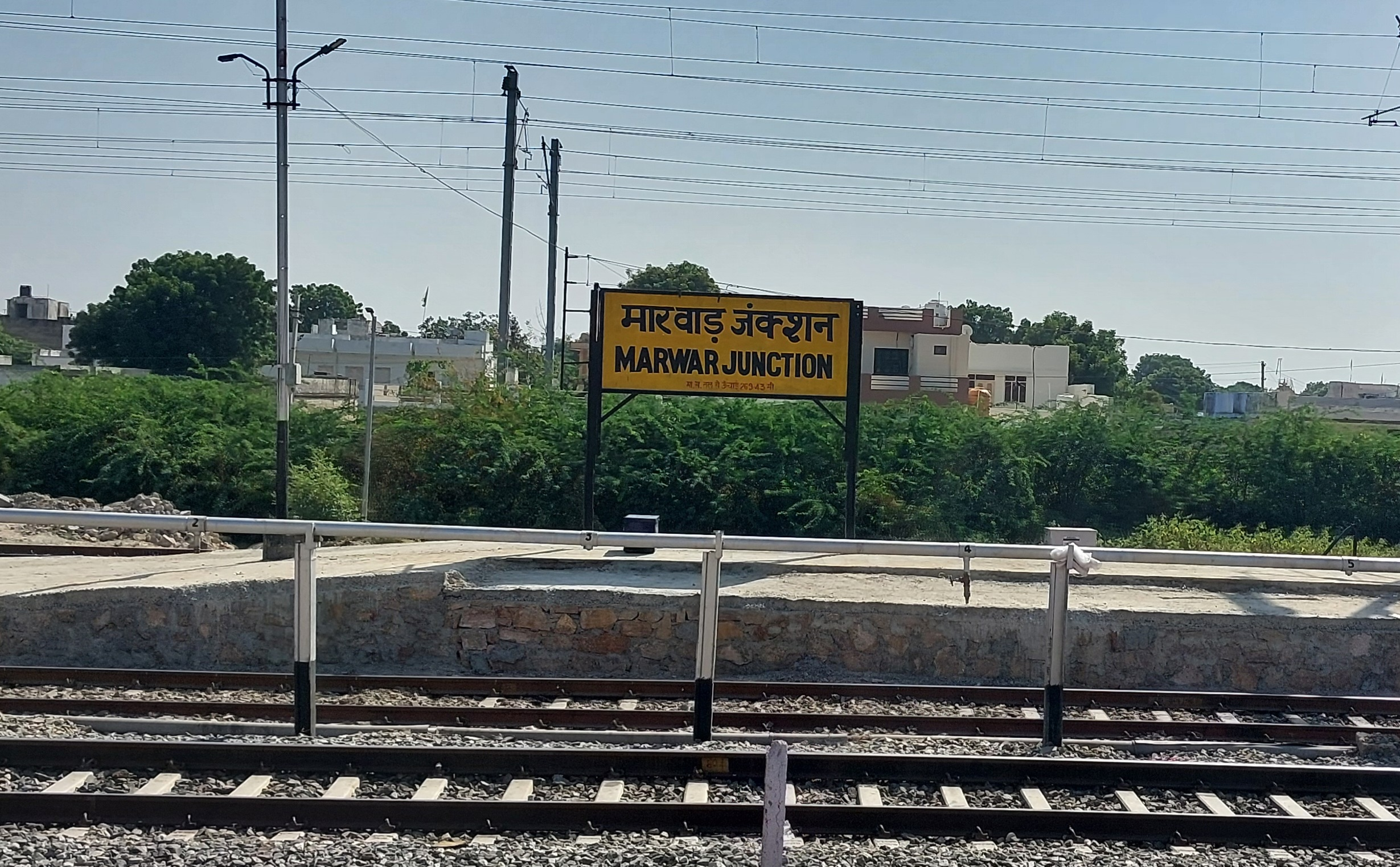
- Marwar Junction station

- Location in Rajasthan, India Marwar junction (India)
- Coordinates: 25.733°N 73.6°E
- Country: India
- State: Rajasthan
- District: Pali

Population (2011)
  - Total: 12,004

Languages
  - Official: Hindi
- Time zone: UTC+5:30 (IST)
- PIN: 306001
- Telephone code: 02935
- Vehicle registration: RJ-22
- Sex ratio: 928 ♂/♀

Marwar Junction is a census town and tehsil headquarter in Pali district in the Indian state of Rajasthan.

Ajmer-Ahmedabad meter gauge opened in 1881 under Rajasthan State Railway and Marwar Junction railway station became the junction on 24 June 1882 on opening of Marwar-Pali section for Jodhpur railway. Mavli-Marwar Junction metre gauge was opened in 1936. It is now on the broad gauge Delhi-Ahmedabad line.

Marwar Junction is mentioned in Kipling's "The Man Who Would be King" where Peachy Carnahan tells Kipling to meet Daniel Dravot on the morning of the 24th as Dravot travels on the Bombay mail.

== Demographics ==
As of 2011 India census, Marwar Junction had a population of 12004. Males constitute 52% of the population and females 48%. Marwar Junction has an average literacy rate of 65%, higher than the national average of 59.5%: male literacy is 76%, and female literacy is 52%. In Marwar Junction, 16% of the population is under six years of age.
