= Rohat =

Town in Rajasthan, India

Rohat Rohit
- City
- Location in Rajasthan, India Rohat (India)
- Coordinates: 25.95°N 73.1333°E
- Country: India
- State: Rajasthan
- District: Pali
- Talukas: Rohat

Government
  - Body: Rohat Gram Panchayat
- Elevation: 201 m (659 ft)

Population (2001)
  - Total: 5,787

Languages
  - Official: Rajasthani, Marwari
- Time zone: UTC+5:30 (IST)
- PIN: 306421
- Telephone code: 02932
- Vehicle registration: RJ-22
- Sex ratio: 897 ♂/♀
- Lok Sabha constituency: Pali (Lok Sabha Constituency)
- Vidhan Sabha constituency: Pali
- Civic agency: Rohat Gram Panchayat
- Avg. annual temperature: 30 °C (86 °F)
- Avg. summer temperature: 44 °C (111 °F)
- Avg. winter temperature: 05 °C (41 °F)

Rohat also known as Rohit or Rohet is a town and the tehsil headquarter of Rohat tehsil in Pali district, Rajasthan, India. Rohat is located on Jodhpur-Pali route NH 62. Rohat is a notable place for observing Blackbucks and Siberian Cranes.

== History ==
Rohat was an estate in the Pali pargana of Jodhpur princely state, consisting of 11 villages with an annual revenue of Rs. 18,525. It was held by the Champawat Rathores, specifically the Aaidanot branch and Sagatsinhot sub-branch. The estate was granted to Thakur Dalpat Singh I of the Champawat clan by Maharaja Gaj Singh I of Marwar in 1622. In 1679, during the Mughal conquest of Jodhpur, the estate was confiscated and later regranted in 1706.

== Demographics ==
According to Census 2001, population of Rohat tehsil is 102,599, where male are 52,215 and female are 50,384.

== Rohat tehsil ==
Rohat tehsil is in the north west of the Pali district sharing the border with Jodhpur district and Balotra district. Area of the tehsil is about 1407.75 km^{2}. There are 79 villages in the tehsil under 23 Gram Panchayats.

Rohat tehsil have a large number of population of cattle (2,60,555 in 1997) and domestic animals likecamel, goat, sheep, buffalo
