= Godwari dialect =

Marwari dialect of Rajasthan, India

Godwari
- गोडवाड़ी
- Native to: India (Godwar region of Rajasthan)
- Native speakers: (3 million cited 2001 census)
- Language family: Indo-European: Indo-Iranian; Indo-Aryan; Central Indo-Aryan; Rajasthani; Marwari; Godwari

Language codes
- ISO 639-3: gdx
- Glottolog: godw1241

Godwari is a dialect of Marwari (Rajasthani) spoken in Godwar region of Rajasthan. It is spoken between Ahor Tehsil of Jalore to Bali tehsil of Pali district. Bisaldev raso is written in Godwari.

Folksong sing by ladies on the first day of wedding ritual. On this Day the groom sits on Path and all the household and relative do Tilak to him and it is starting of Marriage in This Region.
