= Sadri =

- Municipality
- Location in Rajasthan, India Sadri (India)
- Coordinates: 25.18°N 73.43°E
- Country: India
- State: Rajasthan
- District: Pali
- Elevation: 502 m (1,647 ft)

Population (2011)
  - Total: 27,394

Languages
  - Official: Hindi
- Time zone: UTC+5:30 (IST)
- PIN: 306702
- Telephone code: 02934
- Vehicle registration: RJ-22
- Sex ratio: 990 ♂/♀

Sadri is a municipality in the Pali district of Rajasthan, India. Before it was formally founded, there were various settlements in the area which fell under the Jagir of the Rajput clan Sindhal Rathore who still reside in the central part of the Municipality at a location called Sindhalo ka Rawla.

== Geography ==
Sadri is located at 25.18°N 73.43°E. It has an average elevation of 502 meters.

== Demographics ==
According to the 2011 Census of India, Sadri had a population of 27,393. Males account for 50.2% (13,762) of the population and females 49.8% (13,631). Sadri has an average literacy rate of 65.54%, which is lower than the national average of 74.04%. The male literacy rate is 83.76%, while the female literacy rate is 46.55%. 14% of the population is under 6 years of age.

== Transport ==
The nearest railway station on the Indian Railways network is Falna which is 25 km from Rani, Rajasthan. The nearest airport is Udaipur, around 100 km from the town. Sadri is on the Jodhpur - Udaipur road and State Highway No. 16. The national highway serving Sadri is 35 km from Sanderao. Sadri is also well connected with Pali, Nathdwara, Kumbhalgarh, Mt. Abu, and other cities.

== Education and health ==
Sadri has several schools and institutions. Some of the notable ones are:

- Vinayak Public Sec. School Sadri
- Desuri Tehshil's First English Medium School
- Saraswati, Vidya Mandir Sec. School Sadri
- M.D.S. Sec. School Sadri
- Adarsh Sr. Sec. The school (Organized by Shree Khetlaji Mandal)
- Delhi Convent Sec. School
- DMB Sr. Sec. School
- Govt. Girls Sr. Sec. School
- Roop Chand, Tara Chand, Deep Chand, Sajjmal Community Health Centre, a 75-bed Hospital
- Shree Vijay Vallabh Hospital
