= Desuri =

- Town
- Location in Rajasthan, India Desuri (India) Desuri (India)
- Coordinates: 25.2833°N 73.5667°E
- Country: India
- State: Rajasthan
- District: Pali

Government
  - Body: Desuri Gram Panchayat
- Elevation: 376 m (1,234 ft)

Population (2011)
  - Total: 10,377
- Time zone: UTC+5:30 (IST)
- PIN: 306703
- Telephone code: 02934
- ISO 3166 code: RJ-IN
- Vehicle registration: RJ-22

Desuri is a Tehsil headquarter, located in the Pali district of Rajasthan, India.
