= Falna =

- Town
- Location in Rajasthan, India Falna (India)
- Coordinates: 25.23°N 73.23°E
- Country: India
- State: Rajasthan
- District: Pali
- Talukas: Bali

Government
  - Body: Falna Municipality

Population (2011)
  - Total: 24,839

Languages
  - Official: Hindi, Marwari
- Time zone: UTC+5:30 (IST)
- PIN: 306116
- Telephone code: 02938
- ISO 3166 code: RJ-IN
- Vehicle registration: RJ-22
- Sex ratio: 926 ♂/♀
- Lok Sabha constituency: Pali (Lok Sabha Constituency)
- Vidhan Sabha constituency: Bali
- Civic agency: Falna Municipality
- Avg. annual temperature: 30 °C (86 °F)
- Avg. summer temperature: 44 °C (111 °F)
- Avg. winter temperature: 05 °C (41 °F)

Falna is a town in Pali district in the Indian state of Rajasthan.

== Demographics ==
As of 2011 India census, Falna had a population of 24,864. Males constitute 52% of the population and females 48%. Falna has an average literacy rate of 66%. Male literacy is 75.6%, and female literacy is 55.7%. In Falna, 12.85% of the population is under 6 years of age.

== Tourism ==
=== Swaran Jain temple ===
Golden Jain temple is large Jain temple built in the 19th century. It belongs to the Śvetāmbara sect of Jainism. The temple has an impressive gold panted façade. The temple features three curved shikharas, stone pillars with elaborate carvings and pyramidal rangmandapa.

== Transport ==
Falna railway station on Jaipur-Ahmedabad line is situated at Falna.
