= Pali district =

Coordinates: 25°46′N 73°19′E

- District of Rajasthan
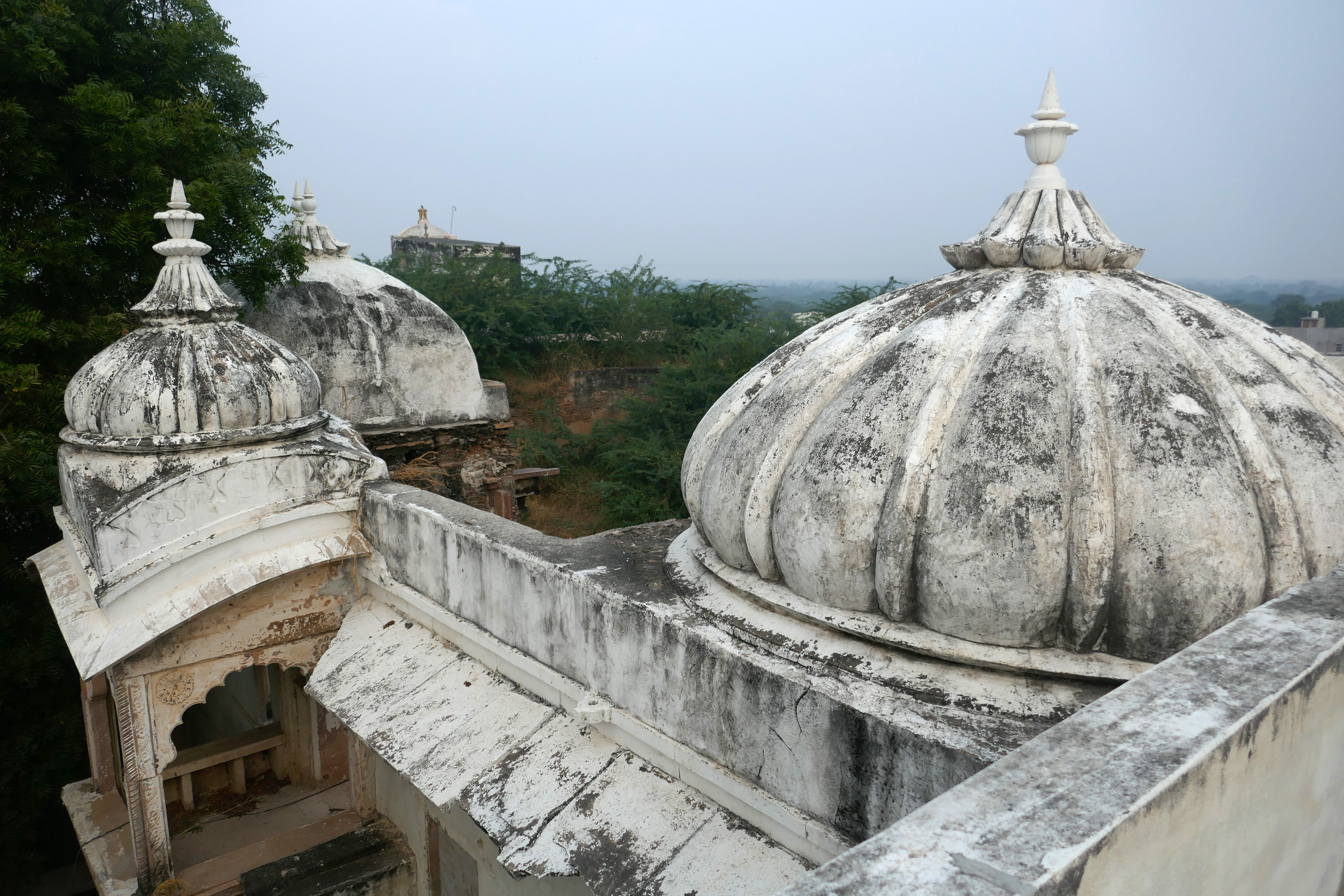
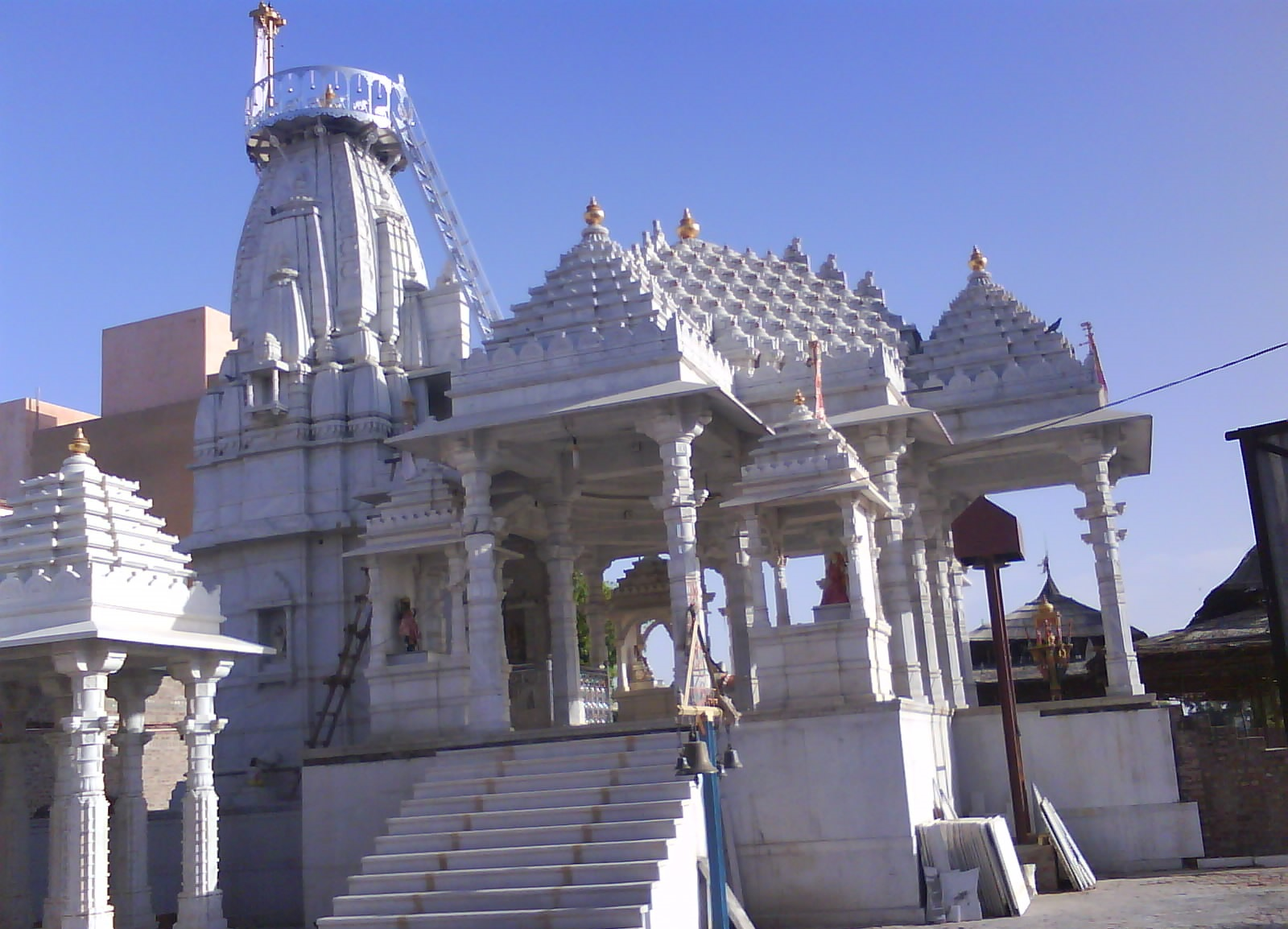
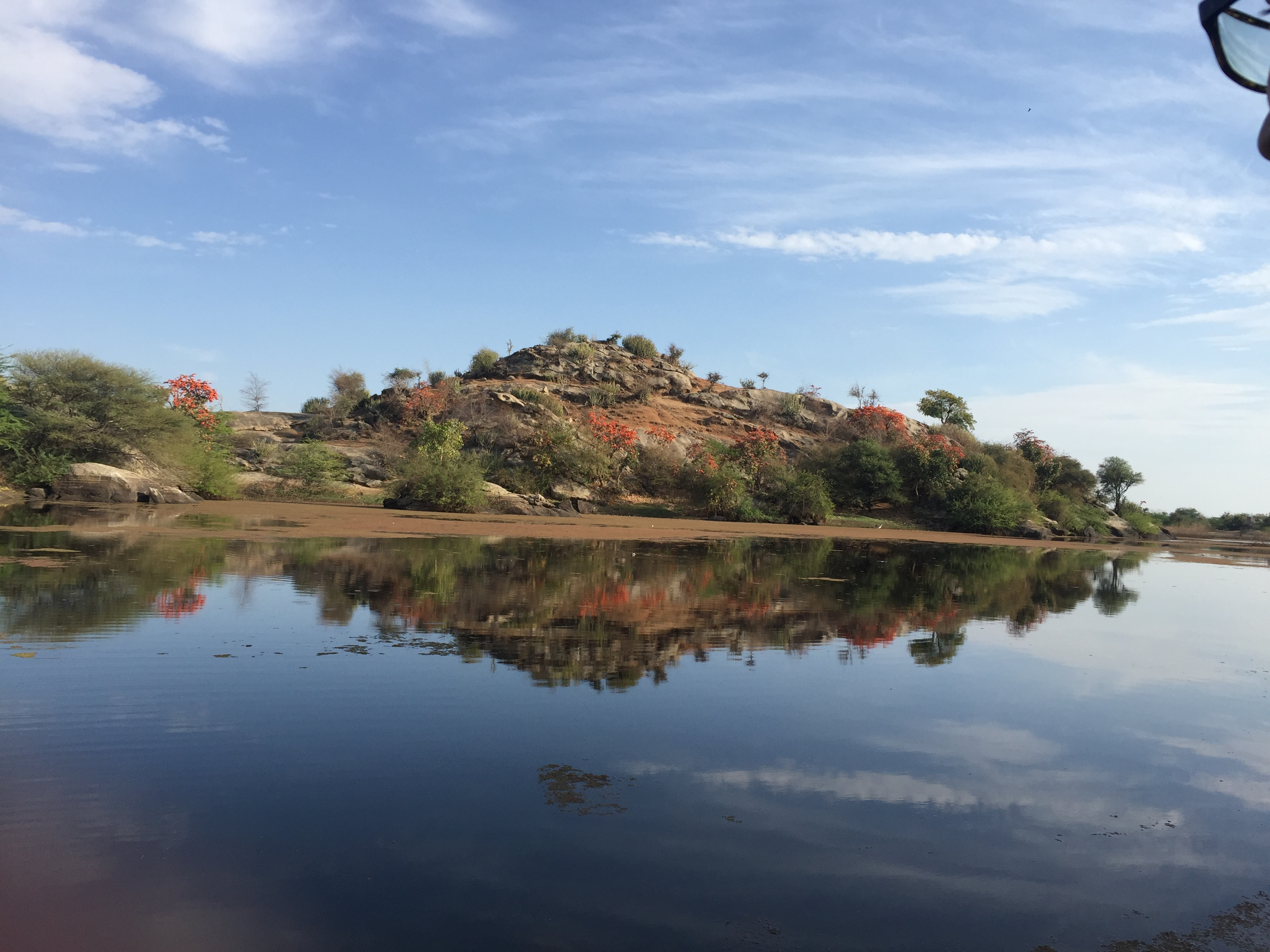
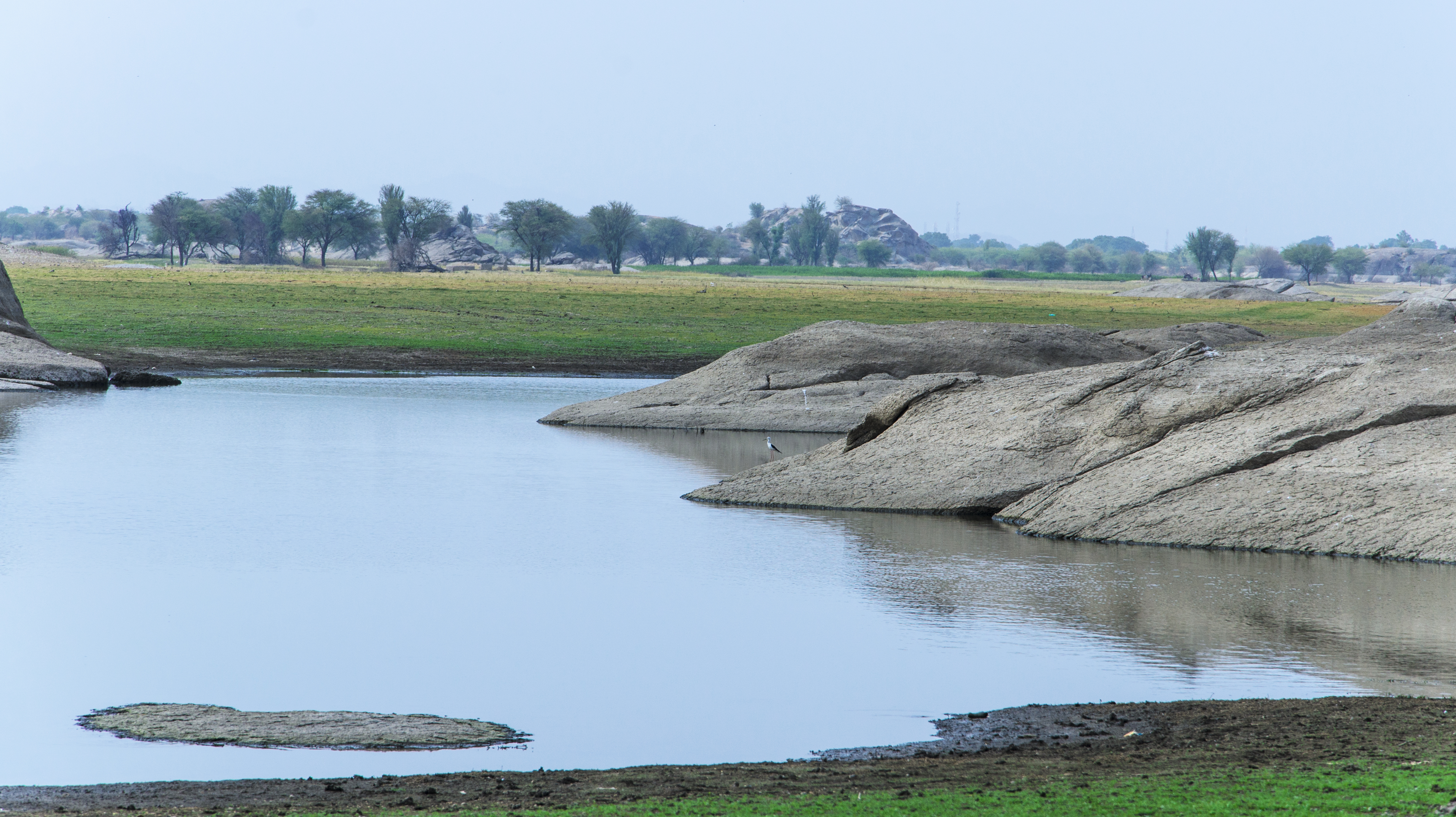
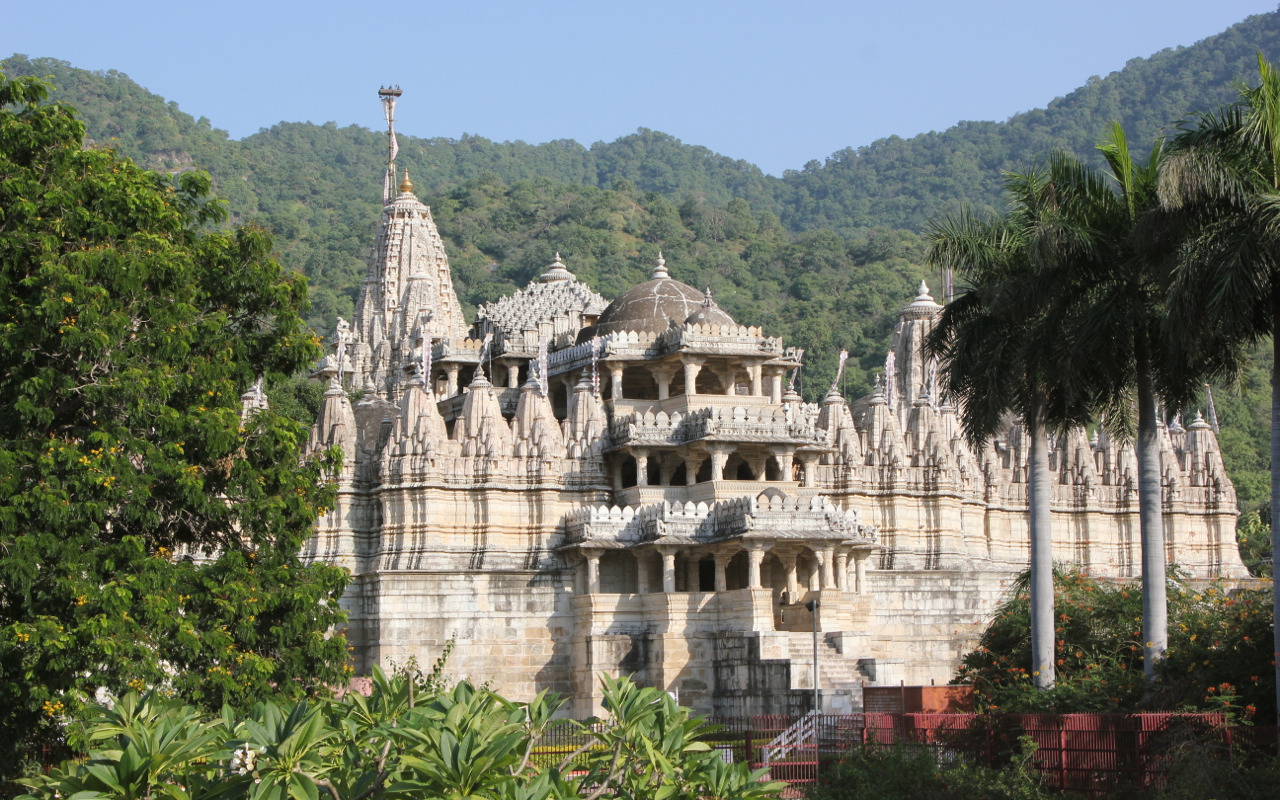
- Clockwise from top-left: Dera Khairwa Fort, Kundeshwar Mahadev Temple, Velar Lake, Ranakpur Jain temple, Lake near Jawai Bera

- Pali district in Rajasthan, India
- Country: India
- State: Rajasthan
- Headquarters: Pali
- Division: Pali

Area
  - Total: 12,387 km^{2} (4,783 sq mi)

Population (2011)
  - Total: 2,037,573
  - Density: 164.49/km^{2} (426.03/sq mi)

Languages
  - Official: Hindi, Rajasthani
- Time zone: UTC+5:30 (IST)
- PIN: 306401
- Telephone code: 02932
- ISO 3166 code: RJ-IN
- Vehicle registration: RJ-22
- Literacy: 63.23%
- Lok Sabha constituency: Pali (Lok Sabha Constituency)
- Avg. annual temperature: 22.5 °C (72.5 °F)
- Avg. summer temperature: 45 °C (113 °F)
- Avg. winter temperature: 00 °C (32 °F)
- Website: pali.rajasthan.gov.in

Pali district is a district in Rajasthan, India. The city of Pali is its administrative headquarters. Pali is also known as the Industrial/Textile City and has been a hub for merchant activities for centuries. It has a rich heritage and culture, including beautiful Jain temples and other elaborate monuments.

== History ==
Historical population
Year	Pop.	±% p.a.
1901	393,837	—
1911	456,627	+1.49%
1921	403,318	−1.23%
1931	473,063	+1.61%
1941	555,586	+1.62%
1951	660,856	+1.75%
1961	805,682	+2.00%
1971	970,002	+1.87%
1981	1,274,504	+2.77%
1991	1,486,432	+1.55%
2001	1,820,251	+2.05%
2011	2,037,573	+1.13%

In 120 AD, during the Kushana Age, King Kanishka conquered the Rohat and Jaitaran areas, parts of today's Pali district. Until the end of the seventh century, the Pushyabhuti king Harshavardhana ruled the area, along with other parts of what would be Rajasthan.

From the 10th to the 15th century, the boundaries of Pali extended to Mewar, Gorwar, and Marwar. Nadol was the capital of the Chauhan clan. All Rajput rulers resisted foreign invaders, but individually fought each other for land and leadership. After the defeat of Prithviraj Chauhan by Muhammad Ghori, the Rajput power in the area was removed. The Godwad area became subject to the then-ruler of Mewar, Maharana Kumbha; however, Pali, which was ruled by Rajputs with the patronage of neighbouring Rajput rulers, remained peaceful and progressive.

There were a number of battles in the surrounding areas of Pali in the 16th and 17th centuries. Shershah Suri defeated Rajput rulers in the Battle of Sammel near Jaitaran, and the Mughal emperor, Akbar, constantly battled with Maharana Pratap in the Gorwar area. After the Mughals had conquered almost all of Rajputana, Veer Durgadas Rathore of Marwar made organised efforts to take back Marwar from Aurangzeb, the last Mughal emperor. By then, Pali had become subservient to the Rathores of Marwar, and was reclaimed by Maharaja Vijay Singh before becoming a commercial centre.

During the British era in 1857, various Thakurs of Pali under the stewardship of the Thakur of Auwa fought against British rule. The British army surrounded Auwa Fort and the conflict lasted several days.

Geologists trace the settlement at Pali back to prehistory and maintain that Pali emerged from the vast western sea, which was spread over a large part of present-day Rajasthan. In the Vedic period, Maharshi Javali stayed in the area to meditate and interpret the Vedas. In the Mahabharata age, the Pandavas made this area (near Bali) their resting place during exile. As a part of ancient Arbuda Province, the area was known as Balla-Desh.

== Geography ==
The Aravalli Range forms the eastern boundary of the district, and the southern boundary ends at Bamnera village in Sumerpur Tehsil. There are foothills to the west, through which run some Luni River tributaries. The western portion of the district includes the alluvial plain of the Luni. The district is bounded by eight others: Nagaur District to the north, Ajmer District to the northeast, Rajsamand District to the east, Udaipur District to the southeast, Sirohi District to the southwest, Jalore District and Barmer District to the west, and Jodhpur District to the northwest. The major part of the district has ranges from 200 to 300 m above mean sea level in elevation, but in the east—toward the Aravalli Range—the elevation increases and the average is closer to 600 m, with some regions exceeding 1000 m.

=== National geological monument ===
The Barr Conglomerate has been declared a National Geological Monument of India by the Geological Survey of India for their protection, maintenance, promotion and enhancement of geotourism.

== Politics ==
=== Lok Sabha ===
The Pali Lok Sabha constituency has jurisdiction over two districts: Pali and Jodhpur. The current member of parliament is P P Choudhary, who represents the Bharatiya Janata Party (BJP).

=== Legislative assembly (Vidhan Sabha) ===
The district is represented in the State Legislature by six MLAs (Sojat, Jaitaran, Sumerpur, Bali, Pali and Marwar Junction) and one Member of Parliament.

== Administrative Structure ==
Sub-Divisions of Pali District
Sub-Division	Tehsil	Panchayat Samiti
Bali	Bali	Bali
Desuri	Desuri	Desuri
Raipur	Raipur	Raipur
Rohat	Rohat	Rohat
Rani	Rani	Rani
Pali	Pali	Pali
Jaitaran	Jaitaran	Jaitaran
Marwar Junction	Marwar Junction	Marwar Junction
Sojat	Sojat	Sojat
Sumerpur	Sumerpur	Sumerpur

=== Sub-divisions ===
Pali District has ten sub-divisions: Sojat, Marwar Junction, Jaitaran, Raipur, Sumerpur, Bali, Pali, Rohat, Rani and Desuri.

=== Panchyat Samiti ===
The Pali district has ten panchayat samiti: five are reserved for Scheduled Castes and Scheduled Tribes and Other Backward Class, and the other five are general.

=== Tehsils ===
There are 10 Tehsils in the district: Sojat, Marwar Junction, Jaitaran, Raipur, Sumerpur, Bali, Pali, Rohat and Desuri. Rani has been declared to become the tenth Tehsil. Marwar Junction Tehsil has highest number of villages (142), Sumerpur Tehsil has lowest number of villages (42).

== Villages ==
There are 1,030 villages under 320 gram panchayats in the Pali district. Some villages in Pali district are following:

- Punariya
- Jawadiya * Akeli * Aaichiya * Arkawas * Bala * Baniyawas * Bhalelao * Kerala * Chatelaw * Vayad * Jaitpura
- Gadwara * Moria * Bitu * Chotila * Gura Endla * Gura Pratapsingh * Guradai * Gura Khuni * Gura Sonigara
- Hathlai * Indra Nagar * Kherwa * Khimel * Khinwara * Khudala * Koliwara * Korta * Koselao * Kot
- Khand Solankiyan * Giradra * Mandiya * Mooliyawas * Jojawar * Dhanla * Dhola * Dhabar * Denda * Sirana, etc.

=== Civic bodies ===
There are eight municipalities (Nagar Palika) in the district: Sojat, Sojat Road, Sumerpur, Sadri, Bali, Falna, Takhatgarh and Rani, Rajasthan; Pali is a Nagar Nigam.

== Places of interest ==
- Ranakpur Temple
- Jawai Bandh
- Parshuram Mahadev Temple, walking route starts in Pali district.
- Om Banna Shrine
- Muchala Mahavir Ji

== Hydrology ==
The area under irrigation is 2824.02 km^{2}, which is about 22.79% of the total geographical area of the district. Wells are the main sources of irrigation in the district, which constitute the source for 75% of the total irrigated area, followed by ponds tanks (20%) and tube wells (5%). In all, the district has ninety-two dams, of which three are broken: one each at Gajni, Potalia and Chipatia. The total catchment area of all the dams is 238,150.14 acres (963.7594 km^{2}). In 1990, the capacity of the 89 dams was 20,197.3 million cubic feet.

There are 48 dams in the district, named with completion date where known:

- Jawai Dam (1957)
- SardarSamand Dam (1905)
- Hemawas Dam (1911)
- Phulad Dam (1972)
- Sindroo (1977)
- Sadri Dam
- Babra (1981)
- Kana (1961)
- Ker (1977)
- Juna Malari (1978)
- Dandiya (1978)
- Shivnath Sagar (1971)
- Giri-Nanda Dam
- Bankli Dam
- Kharda Dam
- Rajpura Dam
- Takhatgarh Dam
- Mithari Dam
- Kalibor Dam
- Vayad
- Sali ki Dhani
- Khiwandi
- Baniyawas
- Endla
- Giroliya
- Borinada Dam
- Siriyari
- Kantaliya
- Jogdawas I
- Jogdawas II
- Saran
- Sindarli
- Chirpatiya
- Kot Baliyan
- Dantiwara
- Latara
- Futiya
- Peepla
- Sewari
- Rajsagar Chopra
- Malpuriya
- Kanawas
- Muthana
- Bandi Nehara
- Bomdara
- Kesuli
- Lodiya
- Hariom Sagar
- Sali ki Nal

Some of the reservoirs created by the dams are used for irrigation, potable water, and flood control. Jawai Dam is the largest dam in western Rajasthan.

== Transport ==
The only two modes of travel available in the district are roadways and railways.

Almost all of the villages are connected by roads. There are two depots of government-owned state transport: Pali and Falna.

The only railway junction in the district is Marwar Junction, which is connected to Jodhpur, Ajmer, Ahmedabad, and Udaipur. Pali railway station is on the Jodhpur route while the second highest earning railway station in the Ajmer division, Falna is on the Ahmedabad route.

The railway came to the district in the early age of Indian Railways in 1881 when the Ahmedabad-Ajmer line opened at Rajputana State Railway. Pali was connected to Marwar Junction on 24 June 1882 and to Luni on 17 June 1884. Jodhpur was connected to the district via Luni in 1885 by the Rajputana-Malwa Railway network, and the first train traveled on this route on 9 March 1885. The line later became part of the Jodhpur-Bikaner Railway.

The Phulera-Marwar Junction line was converted from Meter Gauge to Broad Gauge in 1995, while the Ahmedabad-Ajmer line was converted in 1997. During 1997–98, the 72 km Jalore-Falna route was also surveyed by Indian Railways.

== Demographics ==
Religions in Pali district (2011)
Religion	Percent
Hinduism	92.79%
Islam	5.87%
Jainism	1.12%
Other or not stated	0.22%

According to the 2011 census Pali district has a population of 2,037,573, giving it a ranking of 255th out of 640. This gives it a ranking of 225th in India (out of a total of 640). Its population growth rate over the decade 2001–2011 was 11.99%. Pali had a sex ratio of 987 females for every 1000 males, and a literacy rate of 63.23%. 22.58% of the population lives in urban areas. Scheduled Castes and Scheduled Tribes make up 19.54% and 7.10% of the population respectively.

After the reorganization of districts, the new Pali district has a population of 1,605,543. The district has a sex ratio of 986 females per 1000 males. 437,385 (27.24%) lived in urban areas. Scheduled Castes and Scheduled Tribes made up 317,836 (19.80%) and 142,911 (8.90%) of the population respectively.

Languages in Pali district (2011)
1. Rajasthani (59.5%)
2. Marwari (35.2%)
3. Hindi (3.24%)
4. 'Other' Hindi (1.73%)
5. Others (0.41%)

At the time of the 2011 census, 59.45% of the population spoke Rajasthani, 35.17% Marwari and 3.24% Hindi as their first language. 1.43% of the population spoke 'Others' under Hindi.

== Notable people ==
- Dr R S Champawat, Indian scientist
- Meera Bai
- Maharana Pratap
- Adho Duraso
- Kushal Singh Champawat
- Pankaj Jain

== See also ==
- Kharchia wheat
