= Pali, Rajasthan =

Pali Pali
- City
- View of Pali city in Rajasthan.

- Location within Rajasthan Location within India
- Coordinates: 25.77°N 73.33°E
- Country: India
- State: Rajasthan

Government
  - Type: Municipal Corporation
  - Body: Nagar Nigam
  - Mayor: Namita Bubkiya (BJP)

Area
  - City: 77 km^{2} (30 sq mi)

Population (2025)
  - City: 586,214
  - Density: 7,600/km^{2} (20,000/sq mi)
  - Metro: 586,214

Languages,
  - Official: Hindi & Urdu, Marwari, Godwari (Rajasthani)
- Time zone: UTC+5:30 (IST)
- PIN: 306401
- Telephone code rani: 02932
- ISO 3166 code: RJ-IN
- Vehicle registration: RJ-22
- Sex ratio: 916 ♂/♀
- Website: pali.rajasthan.gov.in

Pali is a city and capital division in Pali district in Indian state of Rajasthan. It is the administrative headquarters of Pali district. It is on the banks of the river Bandi and is 70 km (43 mi) south east of Jodhpur.

== History ==
Pali (formerly known as Pallika and Palli) was a trade centre. In the 11th century AD, Pali was ruled by the Guhilas of Mewar. In the 12th century it became a part of the Nadol kingdom and was ruled by the Chauhans. In 1153 AD it was ruled by Kumarapala and his feudatory Vahadadeva. Then it came under possession of the Songara Chauhans of Jalore.

The Rathore dynasty chronicles relate that Siyaji or Sheoji, grandson of Chandra, the last Gahadvala Rathore ruler of Kannauj, came to Marwar on a pilgrimage to Dwarka in Gujarat, and on halting at the town of Pali, he and his followers settled there to fight against the raids of marauding bands and foreign invaders. Rajputs and Paliwal Brahmins fought bravely against Feroz Shah in the 13th century but couldn't resist his large army. His devali with the inscription of 1273 AD was discovered 21 km north west of Pali.

Rao Chunda, tenth in succession from Siyaji Rathore, finally wrested control of Marwar from the Pratiharas. His brother's son and successor, Rao Jodha, moved the capital to the city of Jodhpur, which he founded in 1459. Pali remained a part of the Marwar kingdom until 1949, when the last ruling Maharaja acceded to newly independent India. The oldest temple in Pali is the temple of Somanatha. Maharana Pratap mother, Rani Jayawanta Bai, was the daughter of Maharawal Akheraj Sonigara, the ruler of Pali. This established a strong maternal connection for Maharana Pratap with the Pali region, making it his 'Nanihal' (maternal home). Maharan Pratap's Statue inaugurated on 4 June 2011 by District Collector Neeraj Kumar Pawan.

== Geography ==
Pali is located at 25.77°N 73.33°E. It has an average elevation of 214 metres (702 feet).

== Demographics ==
Religion in Pali (2011)
Religion	Percent
Hinduism	75.59%
Islam	18.79%
Jainism	4.93%
Sikhism	0.43%
Other or not stated	0.26%
Distribution of religions

As of 2011 Indian census, Pali had a population of 229,956. Males constitute 52.2% of the population and females 47.8%. Pali has an average literacy rate of 68.2%, lower than the national average of 74.04%: male literacy is 77.24%, and female literacy is 59%. In Pali, 13% of the population is under 6 years of age.

Languages of Pali (2011)
1. Rajasthani (80.4%)
2. Hindi (10.3%)
3. Marwari (7.98%)
4. Others (1.29%)

At the time of the 2011 census, 80.42% of the population recorded their language as Rajasthani, 10.31% Hindi and 7.98% Marwari as their first language.

== Industries ==
Pali has been famous for its textile industries. Cotton, synthetic clothes, and yarn are exported to other states of India at a very cheap price. Some new industries have also been developed such as those of bangles, marble cutting, marble finishing, etc.

One of the largest composite textile mills in India is the 'Maharaja Shri Umaid Mill' located in Pali. The main products of the mill include cotton and yarn, which are used to prepare different clothes.

There are three industrial areas in Pali, namely the Mandia Road Industrial Area, the Industrial Area phase 1 & 2, and the Punayata Industrial Area. Mandia Road Industrial Area is the largest and the oldest of all.

Besides this, many more industries are situated in different areas of Pali district i.e. leather-based industries, agriculture instruments, chemical industries, cement industries, and mineral-based units. Among these, granite industries have recently flourished due to the easy availability of raw material and favorable geographical location.

Pali has seen the emergence of the fintech sector, exemplified by AeronPay, headquartered in the city. Founded in 2018 and part of the Aeronfly Group, AeronPay is an Indian fintech company. Outlook India reported the launch of their unified open API platform for financial technology. AeronPay's contact page confirms their Pali location. This indicates a diversification in Pali's economy.

However, the problem of pollution is imminent. Common effluent treatment plants have been established in the last few years to treat the discharged water from various industries.

== See also ==
- Paliwal
