= Adinath Temple =

Adinath temple may refer to:

- Adinath Temple, Dungarpur, Jain temple in Rajasthan, India; dedicated to Rishabhanatha (Adinath)
- Adinatha Basadi, Halebidu, Jain temple (basadi) in Karnataka, India; dedicated to Rishabhanatha
- Adinatha temple, Khajuraho, Jain temple in Madhya Pradesh, India; dedicated to Rishabhanatha
- Adinath Temple, Maheshkhali, Hindu temple in Chittagong, Bangladesh; dedicated to Shiva
- Adinatha temple, Pavagadh, Jain temple in Gujarat, India; dedicated to Rishabhanatha
- Adinatha temple, Ranakpur, a Jain temple in Rajasthan, India; dedicated to Rishabhanatha
- Adinath Lokeshwar, a Hindu and Buddhist temple in Nepal; dedicated to Shiva
- Adinath Temple, a claimed former name of Adina Mosque, Malda, West Bengal, India

== See also ==
- Adinath (disambiguation)
