= Adinatha (disambiguation) =

Adinatha, meaning "first lord" or "primordial lord", is another name for Rishabhanatha (also called Rishabhadeva), who is regarded in Jainism as the first tirthankara (spiritual teacher).

Adinatha or Adinath may also refer to:

== Religion ==
- Adinatha, a name of the Hindu god Shiva in the Natha tradition
  - Adinatha Sampradaya, a sadhu sub-sect of the Natha sampradaya
  - Shri Adinath Akhara, an ashram dedicated to Shiva in Buxar District, Bihar, India
- Adi-Buddha, the first or primordial Buddha in Buddhism

== People ==
- Adinath Kothare, Indian actor, director, and producer
- Adinath Lahiri, Indian geochemist
- Vilas Adinath Sangave, Indian sociologist and Jainologist
- Vinayak Adinath Buwa, Indian author

== See also ==
- Rishabha (disambiguation)
- Adinath Temple (disambiguation)
- Aadhi Naath, Hindi title of the 2006 Indian Tamil-language film Aathi
