= Buwa =

Buwa may refer to:

== People ==
- Dilip Buwa (1966–1991), Indian gangster
- Mirashi Buwa (1883–1966), Indian classical singer
- Omasan Buwa (born 1965), Nigerian lawyer and writer
- Vinayak Adinath Buwa (1925–2011), Indian humor writer

== Places ==
- Buwa, Shwegu, a village in Bhamo District, Kachin State, Burma
