= Somsundar Suri =

Acharya Somsundar Suri

Personal life
- Born: Somkumar; Vikram Samvat 1430 (1373 CE) Palanpur
- Died: Vikram Samvat 1499 (1442 CE) Ranakpur
- Parent(s): Sajjana, Malhandevi

Religious life
- Religion: Jainism
- Sect: Śvetāmbara
- Initiation: Somsundar by Jayanand Suri

Religious career
- Teacher: Jayanand Suri
- Post: Acharya (Jainism)

Somsundar Suri was a 15th-century Jain monk and leader of the Tapa Gaccha, a monastic order of Swetambara Jainism. He had consecrated several Jain temples and had written several works in Sanskrit, Prakrit and Gujarati.

== Biography ==
The Soma-Saubhagya Kavya, Guru Guna Ratnakara-Kavya and several other texts details the life and religious activities of Somsundar Suri.

Somsundar Suri was born to Sajjana and Malhandevi in Magha Vad 14, Friday, Vikram Samvat 1430 in Palanpur. He was named Somkumar by his parents. Tapa Gaccha leader Jayanand Suri visited Palanpur and met his parents. They agreed and Somkumar was initiated in the monkhood at the age of 7 in Vikram Samvat 1437 and was named Somsundar. Following death of Jayanand Suri, Devsundar Suri succeeded as the leader of Tapa Gaccha. After completing his religious studies, Somsundar was appointed religious positions of Gani and later Upadhyaya in Vikram Samvat 1450. He visited Mewar that year where he was received by Chunda who was a son of Maharana Lakha of Mewar, and his minister Ramadeva Nawalakha. There several families following Kharatara Gaccha joined Tapa Gaccha due to his efforts. After spending some time in Mewar, he returned to Anahilpur Patan and was appointed as Acharya in Vikram Samvat 1457. Following death of Devsundarsuri, he succeeded him as the leader of Tapa Gaccha. He traveled in the regions which correspond to present-day Mewar, Gorwar, Sirohi, Madhya Pradesh and Gujarat.

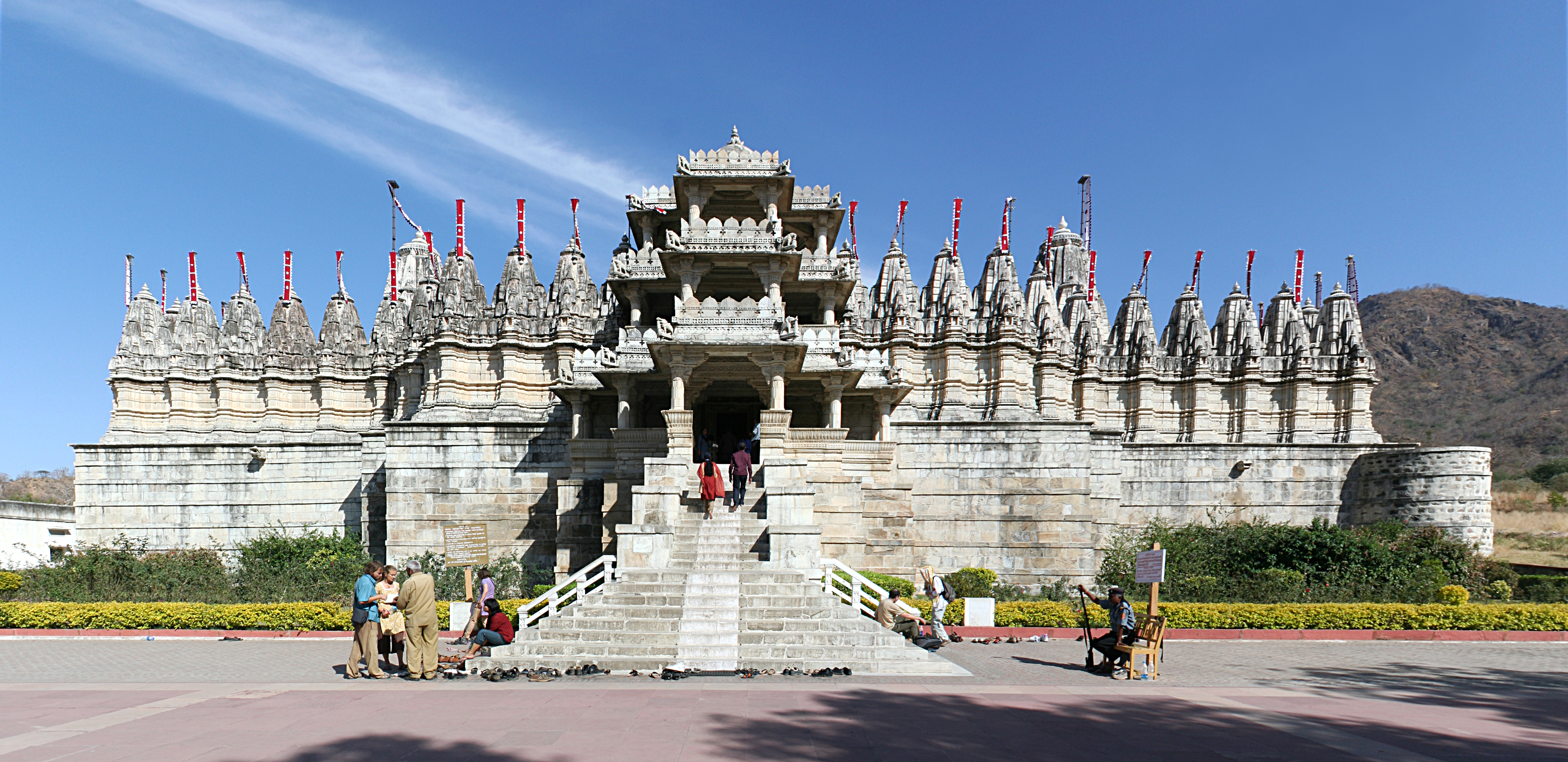
Somsundar Suri consecrated the first storey of this Ranakpur Jain temple. He died and was cremated there.

He undertook many Pratisthā-Sangh-Yatras (consecration pilgrimages) and other religious activities. He performed several journeys to the Shatrunjya temples at Palitana and other religious places. During his tenure, under his tutelage, a large number of monks were initiated and appointed on various religious positions. A large number of temples were restored and built under his guidance including the restoration of Taranga temple. In Vikram Samvat 1478, he consecrated the Jain temple of Jawar. He was at Delawara in Vikram Samvat 1482 when Laxmansinha copied the manuscript of Kalakacharya Katha as its colophon mentions it. When Jirawala Parshwanath temple was renovated, the acharyas of Tapa Gaccha were present there for chaturmas in Vikram Samvat 1483. He consecrated the temple of Machind fort built by Visal, near Kumbhalgarh. In Vikram Samvat 1495, he consecrated the Mahavira-prasada temple at Chittor. He consecrated the first storey of Ranakpur temple, which was constructed by Dharanashah in Vikram Samvat 1498. The consecration ceremony is described by poet Meha's Raningpura Stavana. He died of old age in Vikram Samvat 1499 at Ranakpur where he was cremated.

== Literary works ==
Somsundar Suri had written in Sanskrit, Prakrit and Gujarati.

He authored a number of texts, including Bhashya-traya Churni, Kalyanaka Stavana–Ratna Kosha, Upadesha Balavabodha, Yoga Shastra Balavabodha, and Bhashya-traya Avachurni, among others. The Upadesha Balavabodha is a practical guidance on conduct and social manners. To explain difficult or subtle religious ideas, he often relied on brief illustrative stories.

Another notable text, Yoga Shastra Balavabodha, explores classical yogic thought, including the doctrine of the five Mahavratas along with various related themes. He often chose regional languages for his compositions.

=== Sanskrit ===
- Adinath Stotra (Abumandan)
- Rishabhajina-stavan
- Girnar-stotra
- Jina-kalyan stuti – Vartikadi
- Jina-kalyan stuti – Masanukramen
- Navkhand Parshvanath stavah Avachurni
- Nemijina-stava (Girnar-mandan)
- Yugadideva-stava
- Saptatishata-jina-stuti
- Sadharan Jina Kalyanak Panchak Stavan
- Stambhanak Parshvanath Panchvishatika
- Simandhar Jina-stavan–Bhashashtakamayah Avachurisah
- Yushmadasmad-rupagarbhit Ashtadasha-jina-stavah Avachuri Sah Panchapath
- Chaityavandanadi Bhashyatracha Avachunri
- Devavandanadi Bhashyatracha Avachunri
- Uttam Charitra Narendra-katha Padya
- Rishabhastava Arbuda-chalastha
- Diksha-kalyanak-stava
- Yatijit Kalparatna-kosha
- Atura Pratyakhyan–Avachurni
- Sanskrit Avachuri on Prakrit work Chatusharan-payanana
- Ranpur-simayan Mahaprasade Chaturvishati Jina-stuti
- Chyavan-kalyanak-stava
- Janma-kalyanak-stava
- Jina-kalyanak Pancha-stavan
- Gyan-kalyanak-stavan

=== Prakrit ===
- Aradhana-ras
- Last five Prakrit stanzas of Neminath-kavya

=== Gujarati ===
- Updeshmala–Balavabodh
- Navatattva-prakaran–Balavabodh
- Shraddha-pratikraman-sutra–Padavashyak-vandita Sutrakatha
- Anek Vichar
- Pashthishatak Balavabodh
- Vichar-sangrah Balavabodh
- Vichar-balavabodh
- Yog-shastra-vartik Balavabodh
- Shadavashyak Balavabodh
- Aradhana-pataka–Balavabodha
- Neminath-stavan
- Neminath Samavasaran Stavan
- Neminath-stavan: Swamano Vigyaptirup
- Rangsagar Nemijina Fag (Sanskrit shloka, Prakrit kavya, Gujarati fagu)
- Shri Shatrunjay Shri Adinath-stavan
- Neminath Fag
- Nandishwardvip Prasad Vichar Sthapana Sah
- Goyampuchchha (Gautamaprucchhha) Balavabodh
