= Chobhar =

Chovar चोभार
- Village
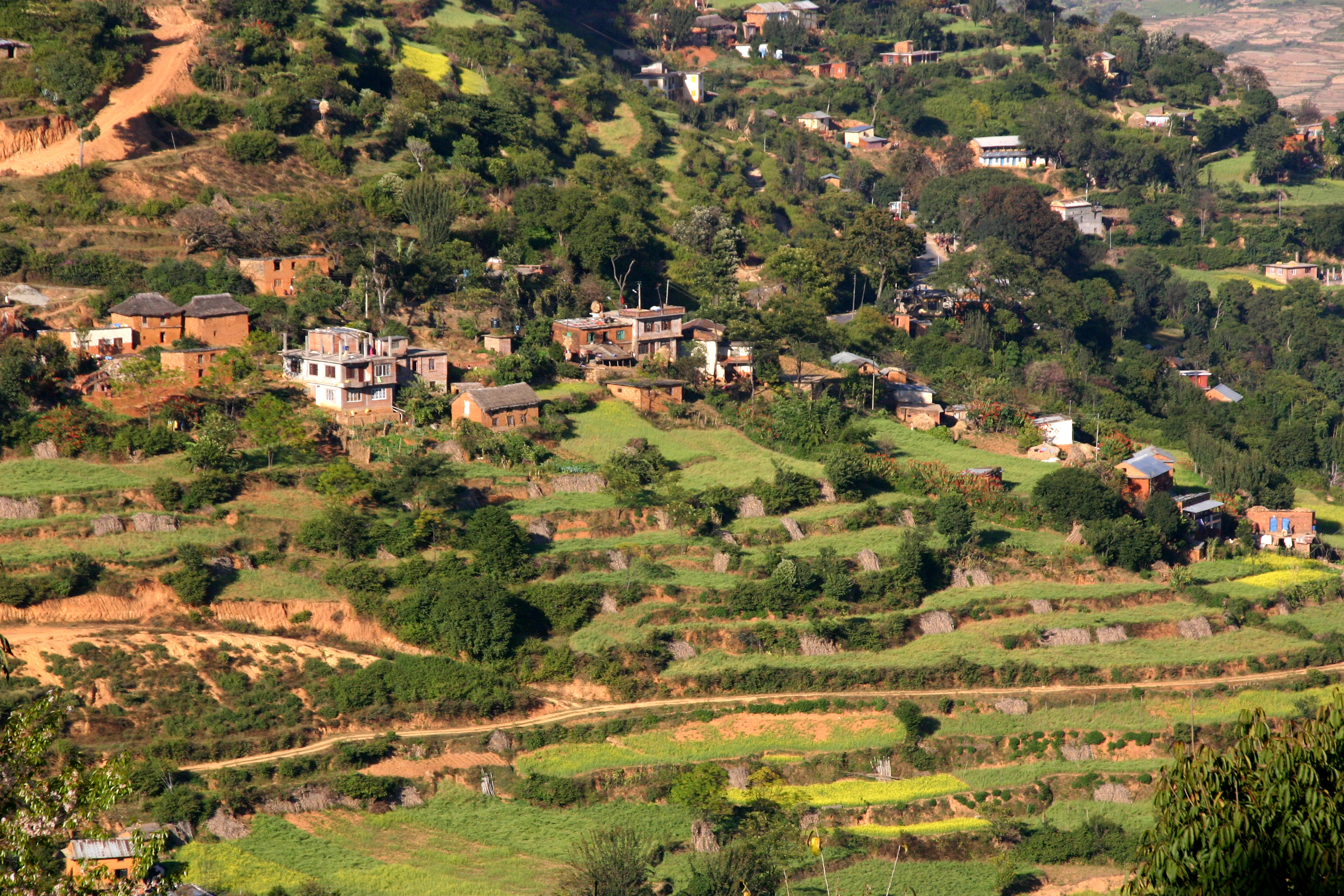

- Location in Nepal
- Coordinates: 27°40′N 85°17′E
- Country: Nepal
- Zone: Bagmati Zone
- District: Kathmandu District

Population (1991)
  - Total: 5,627
  - Religions: Hindu
- Time zone: UTC+5:45 (Nepal Time)

Chobhar (or Chovar, or Chobar) is a village in Kathmandu District in the Bagmati Zone of central Nepal and part of Kirtipur Municipality. At the time of the 1991 Nepal census it had a population of 5,627 living in 1,109 households.

Chobhar is known for the nearby Chobhar Gorge and its Chobhar Caves. There is also a temple, Jal Binayak Temple and Adinath Lokeshwar And Chobhar Hills that is sacred to both Buddhists and Hindus. There are beautiful herbs and suburbs along with limestone adding its more beauty in the town.

One of the biggest income generation of this village is through the supply of water and the tourist site Manjushree Park.

== Toponymy ==
=== Linguistic origin ===
- Linguistic family: Sino-Tibetan
- Language: Newari

=== Etymology ===
The name Chobhar derives from the Newar (Nepal Bhasa) word Chobhah where cho means “high part / top of the hill" and Baha means “monastery” and is short form of bahaal.

According to the Swayambhu Purana and local tradition, the Kathmandu Valley was originally a lake. The Bodhisattva Manjushree cut a gorge in the area now called Chobhar Gorge to drain the waters and make the valley habitable. After this event, Manjushree erected a temple dedicated to the god Chyangrasin (“Tibetan goat”) on the top of the hill. Around this temple, priests and practitioners settled, forming a monastic community.

Chobhar

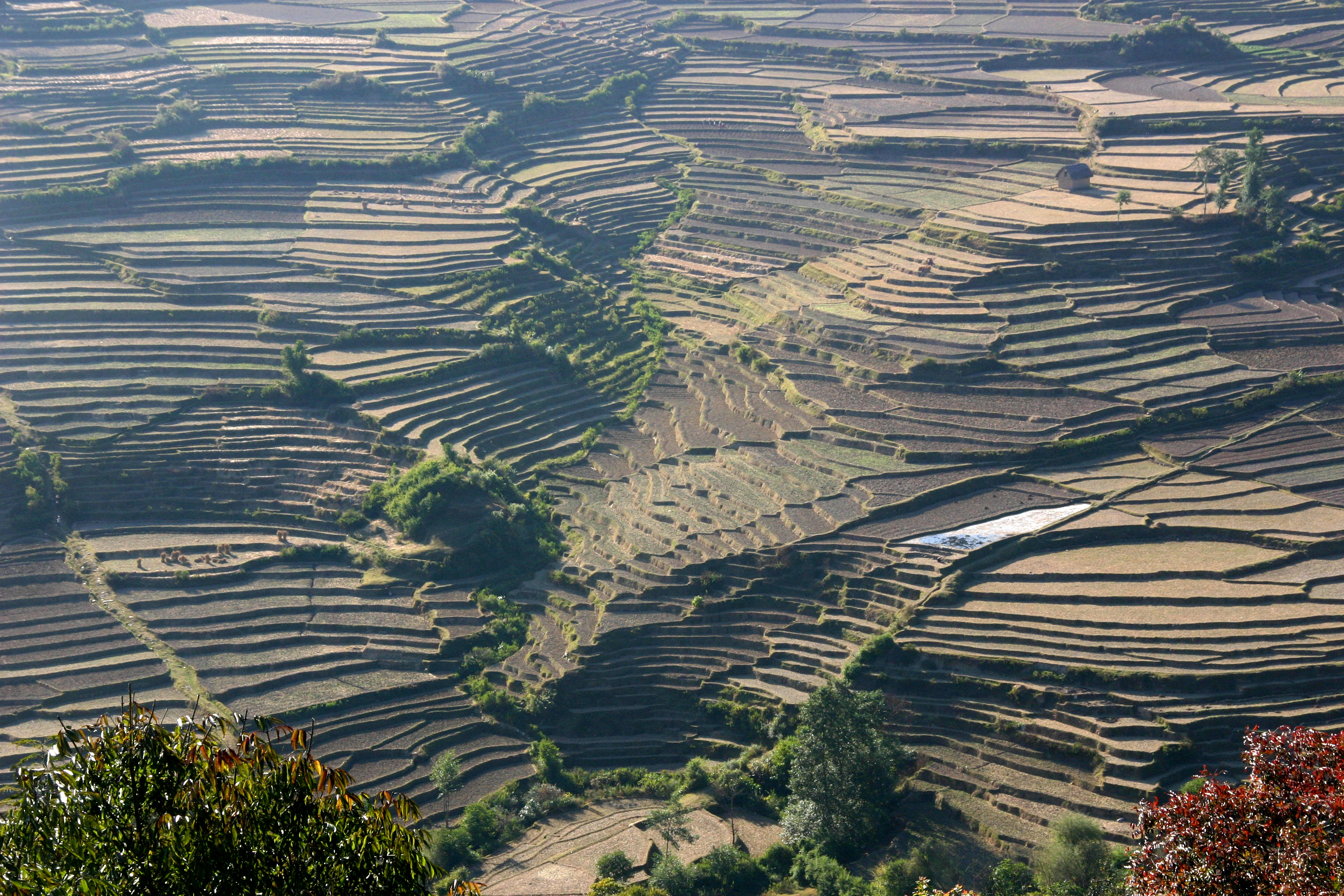
Rice terrasses

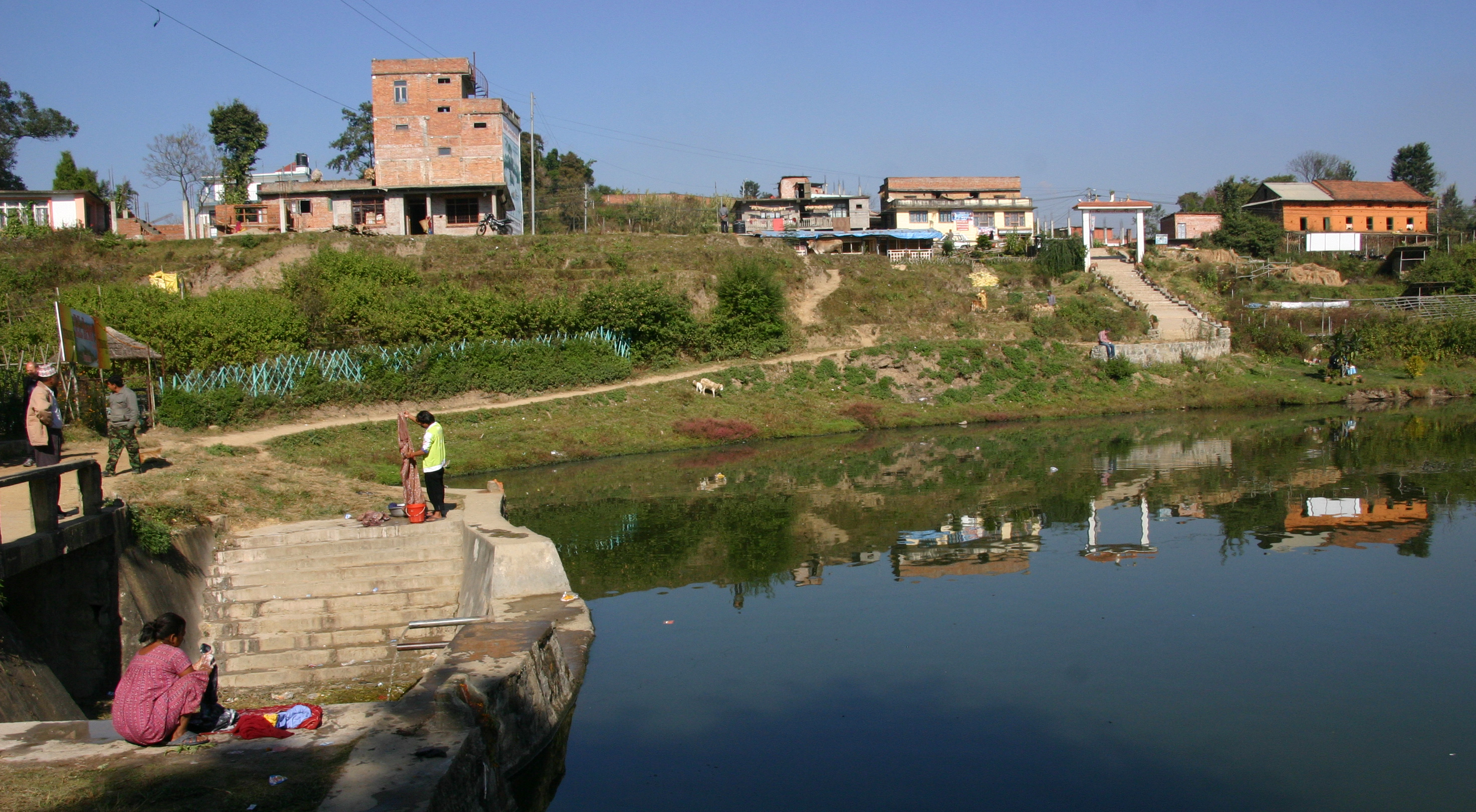
Lake Taudaha

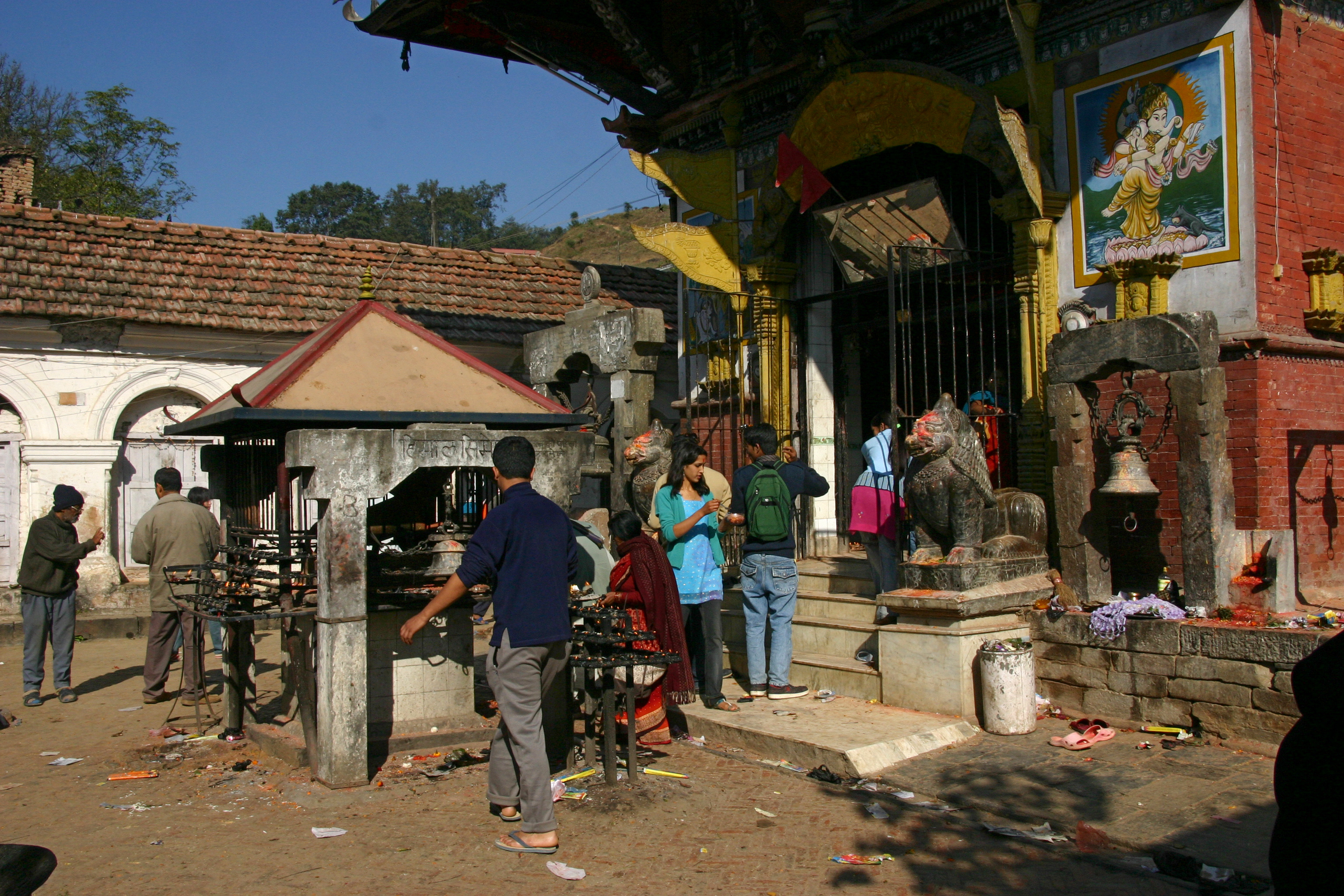
Jal Binayak

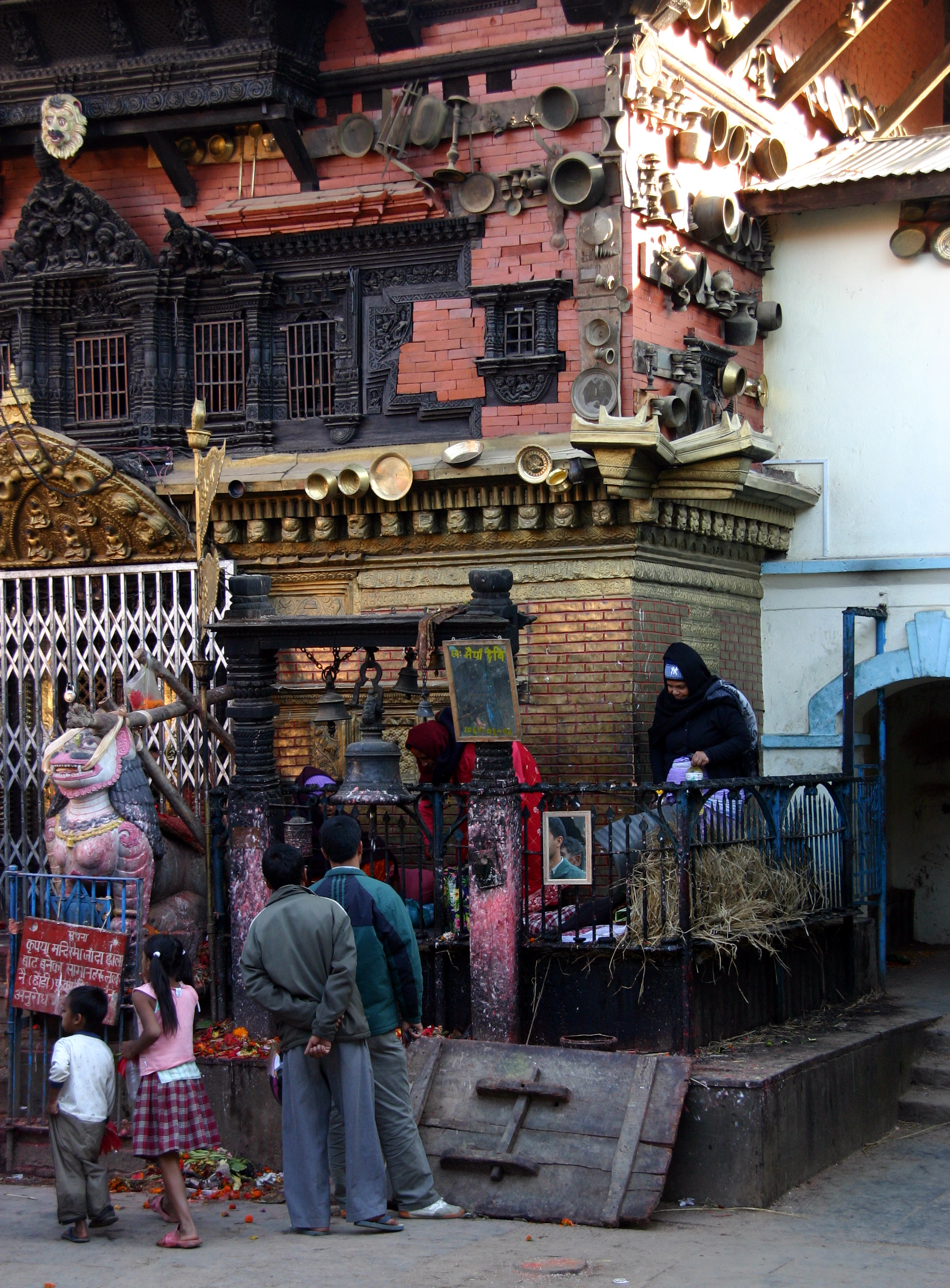
Adinath Lokeshwar
