= Chobhar Caves =

Network of caves near Chobhar, Nepal

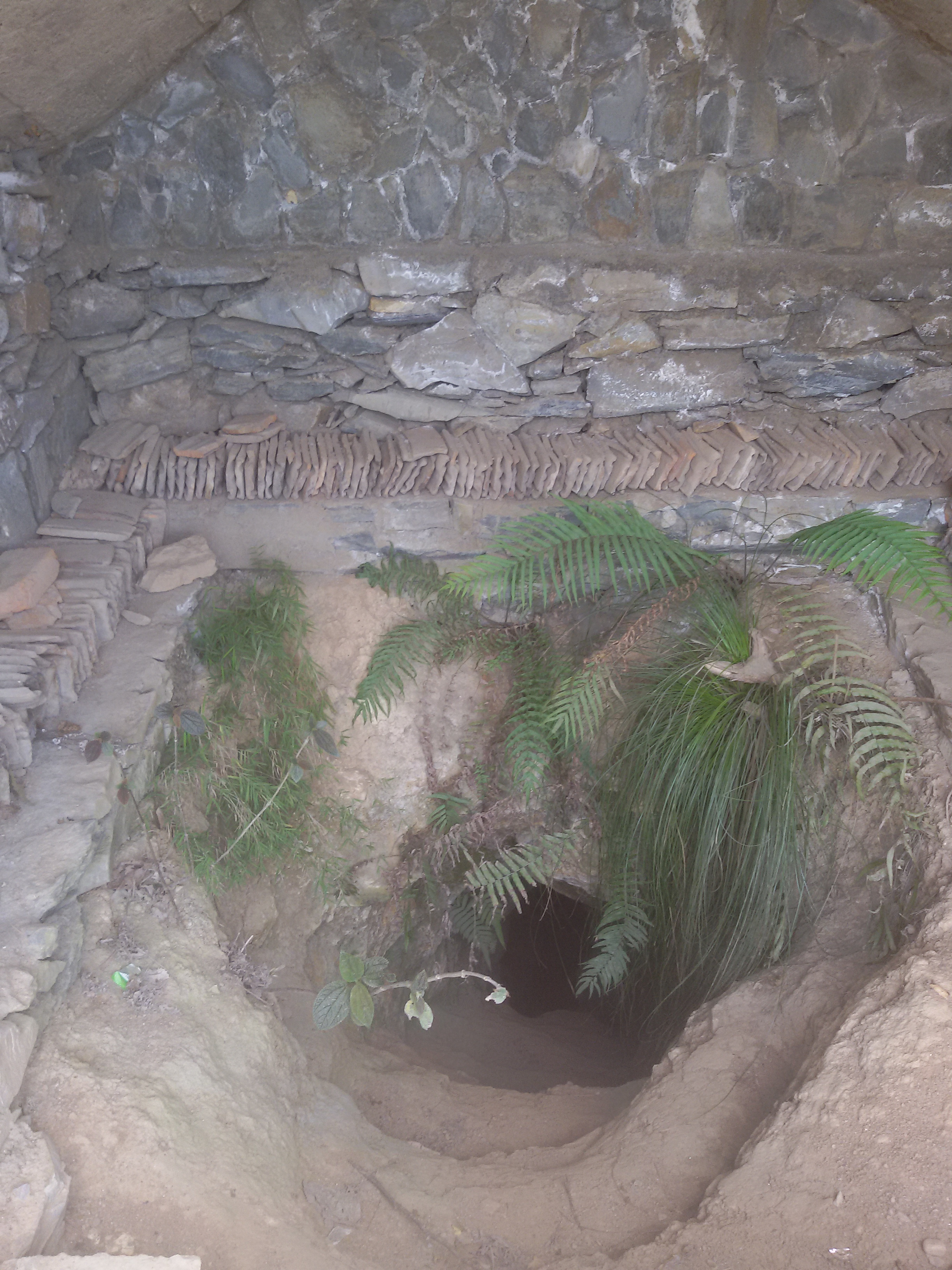
Cave entrance

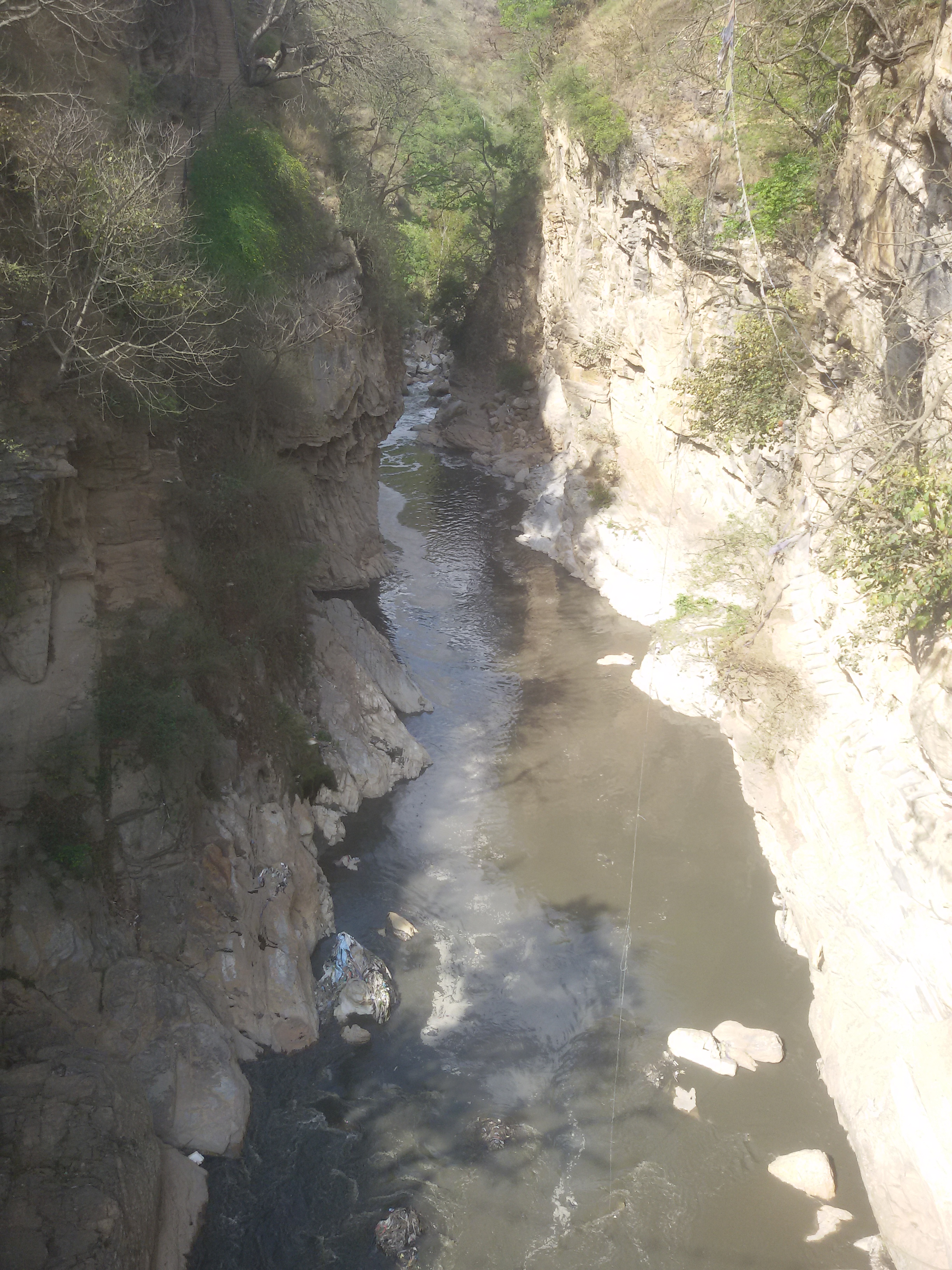
Chobhar gorge

Chobhar Caves are an extensive network of natural phreatic caves near the village of Chobhar, which is located 9 km southwest of Kathmandu, Nepal. Chobhar is also known for the Chobhar gorge through which all the water of the valley drains. A small temple of Adinath Sampradaya sits on top of a nearby hill. The temple offers a view of snow-capped mountains. According to Swayambhu Purana and legend, Kathmandu Valley was once a lake. It is believed that the bodhisattva Manjushree cut a gorge at a place called Chobhar Gorge, near Chobhar Ancient Hill Village (sp. also Chovar, chobar) and drained away the waters to establish a habitable land.

These caves have been explored by research teams from the UK in 1976, Czechoslovakia in 1980 and Germany in 1985. Explorations of the caves in April 2007 indicate that there are at least six known entrances all documented by GPS readings made by a French team of speleologists, led by Maurice Duchesne from France. A map of those caves is now available.

The caves are often infiltrated by water due to fluctuating levels of the nearby Bagmati River. Thus, visitors are strongly advised not visit inside the caves without being accompanied by competent professional guides who have a compass and other equipment required for cave exploration. Maximum safety precautions is advised. No snakes have been sighted in these Chobhar caves but many bats have been sighted.

Measuring a minimum of 1250 metres, Chobhar caves are the largest in Asia. Cross country, the caves are a brief fifteen-minute walk from ancient Chobhar Hill Village.
