= Adinath Temple, Dungarpur =

Jain temple in Durgarpar, Rajasthan, India

Adinath Bhagwan temple
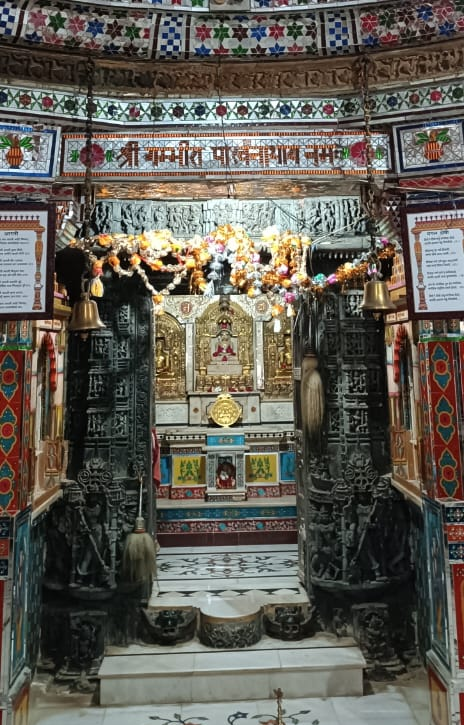
- Inner Sanctum

Religion
- Affiliation: Jainism
- Deity: Adinatha
- Festival: Mahavira Janma Kalyanaka

Location
- Location: Manek Chowk, Dungarpur, Rajasthan
- Interactive map of Adinath Bhagwan temple
- Coordinates: 23.832°N 73.715°E

Architecture
- Creator: Seth Sanvaldas Davda
- Established: 1469 CE
- Temple: 1

Adinath Bhagwan Temple is a Jain Temple in Manek Chowk, Dungarpur, Rajasthan, India. It was built by Seth Sanvaldas Davda in 1469 CE (1526 VS).

== History ==
It is said that in Vikram year 1526 (1469 CE), this temple was built by Sheth Sanvaldas Davda and therein a large size metal idol of Sri Adinath Bhagwan was installed and consecrated at the hands of Sri Udayvallabhsuriji and Sri Gnansagarsuriji, disciples of Acharya Sri Ratnasuriji. During the Muslim period the idol was damaged thinking that it was of gold. The new idol of white color therefore was gain installed after consecration. The metallic "Parikar" however still exists intact on which there is an inscription dated Vikram year 1526.

The specialty of the temple is the metallic "Parikar" in which are cast images of a total of 72 Tirthankaras- 24 past, 24 present and 24 in the future to be. Similar idol with such a frame is extremely difficult to come by anywhere else in the world. The Pabasan ( Pedestal) also on which the lord is seated is made of metal in which 14 dreams, 9 planets, Asthamangal and Yaksha-Yakshinis can be seen. In this temple, there is also an idol of Sri Shanthinath Bhagwan, of height 33 Cms. Made out of crystal transparent stone and 34 Jinabimbs cast in five metals of the period of king Samprati which are very fascinating.
