= Shri Adinath Akhara =

Hindu temple in India

Religion
- Affiliation: Hinduism
- District: Buxar
- Deity: Lord Shiva

Location
- Location: Buxar railway station
- State: Bihar
- Country: India

Shri Adinath Akhara, is an ashram dedicated to Shiva. It is situated 1.5 km from the Buxar railway station at the confluence of the Ganga and Sone canals.

== Names ==
It is also known as Shri Nath Ashram, Charitravan (श्री आदिनाथ आश्रम, श्री नाथ आश्रम, चरित्रवन) or Shri Nath Baba Mandir (श्री नाथ बाबा मंदिर)

== History ==
Siddhashrm is a very ancient name of Charitravan. It is mentioned as a pilgrimage in ancient Hindu scriptures including Shrimad Valmiki Ramayana, Shiva Purana, Vishnu Purana, Narada Purana and Agni Purana.

Chaurasi (Eighty-four) Navnath Siddhas spent a term of penance there, as authenticated by disc-bearing statues excavated there.

Its re-emergence was initiated by Shri Adinath Peethadheeshwar Shri Trilokinathjee Maharaj (Shri Nath Baba jee) in 1964. A temple was constructed and in 1967 idols were installed and Yajna was conducted. Shri Adinath Akhara was formally inaugurated in Prayag Kumbh in 1977 by performing Maharudra Yajna.

== Features ==
Shri Adinath Akhara hosts Saivite benches such as Someshwaranath, Rameshwarnath, Gauri Shankar Mandir, Narmadeshwarnath, Brahmeshwarnath and Panchmukhi Shiv Mandir.

Since the reopening, the tradition of coming together, performing Yajna and Shahi snan at all Kumb locations viz Prayag, Haridwar, Nashik, and Ujjain are conducted continuously. Along with education and cultural services, Shri Aadinath Akhara promotes Vaidik Sanatan Dharma.

In the temple complex, Bhagwan Shri Adinath, Shri Narmadeshwar Mahadev, Shri Gauri Shankar, Shri Guru Gorakhnath, Shri Durga Jee, Shri Navnath Chaurasi Siddha, Shri Seshnath, Shri Ganga jee, Shri Batuk Bhairvnath, Shri Hanuman Jee and Shri Suryadev on a chariot of seven horses are kept. Mahashivaratri, Gurupurnima and Shravan monthly celebrations are held. Three other branches of the Sri Adinath Akhara have been established in Haridwar, Delhi and Nashik.
