= Rishabha (disambiguation) =

Rishabha may refer to:

- Rishabhadeva (Hindu Avatar) an avatar of Vishnu
- Rishabha (svara) a svara in Hindustani and Carnatic music
- Rishabhanatha preacher
