= Adinath Lokeshwar =

Temple in Bagmati Zone, Nepal

Adinath Lokeshwar Temple आदिनाथ लोकेश्वर मन्दिर
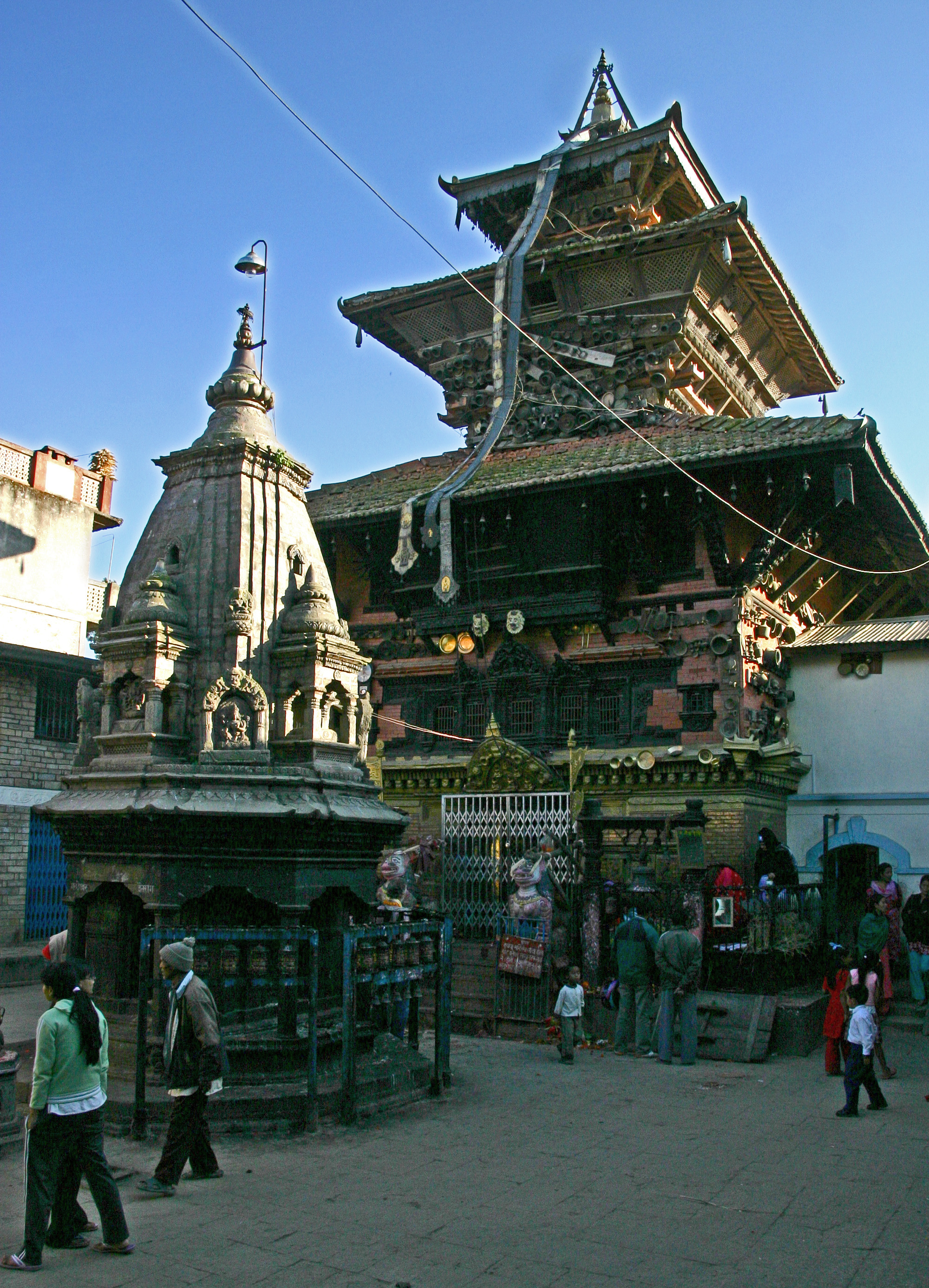

- Location within Nepal

Religion
- Affiliation: Buddhism other_info =: Sect: [[{{{sect}}}]]

Location
- Location: Kathmandu district
- Country: Nepal
- Interactive map of Adinath Lokeshwar Temple आदिनाथ लोकेश्वर मन्दिर
- Coordinates: 27.6657°N 85.2913°E

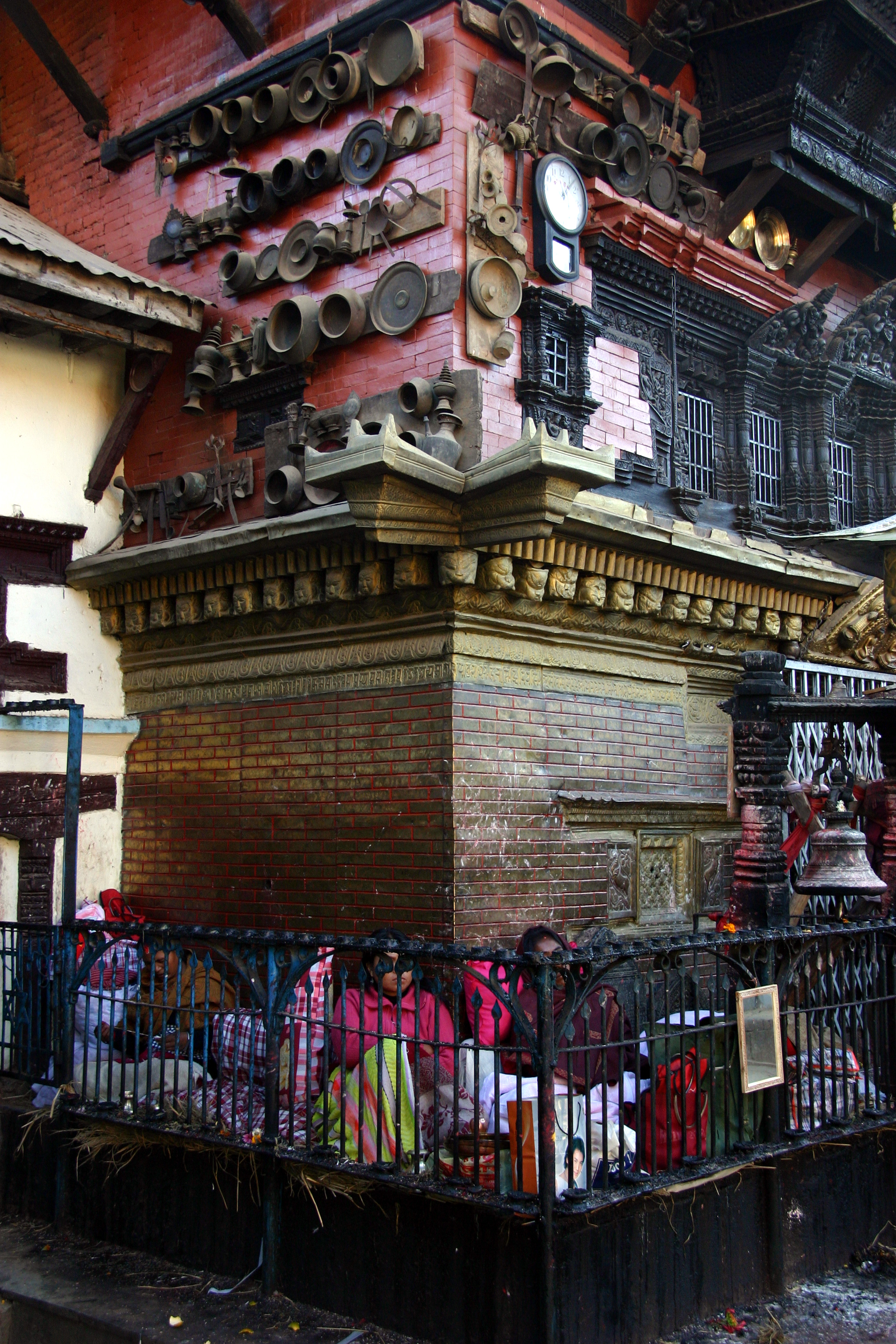

Anandadi Lokeshwar Mandir is a temple sacred to Hindus and Buddhists in the village of Chobar, outside Kathmandu in Nepal. The temple is dedicated to Anandadi Lokeshwar, one of four principal Bodhisattvas honored as Lokeshwars in the Kathmandu Valley (or Adinath for Nepali speakers, who regard this deity as one of four Matsyendranaths). It was built in the 15th century, then rebuilt in 1640. Tourists often refer to this as the "pots and pans" temple, due to all of the domestic implements affixed to its walls. Accounts for this custom vary, but all relate to the welfare of the deceased in the afterlife.

"There are various legends connected to the deity. The story begins with the coming of Manjusri to the valley to drain the lake and make the valley habitable. Manjusri, who has taken the name of Manjudeva for his sojourn, comes to the valley and cuts the rim of the hills near a low hill called Kacchapala Giri, the hill of Chobar. The deity inhabiting the hill is angry because he is being cut by Manjudeva, but Manju retorts that he should be glad as once the lake has been drained away, the Valley will become the seat of a great civilization and one day Sri Tin Lokeshvara will come to take up residence on the hill of Chobar. Many eons later, when the Valley had become a center of civilization and was being ruled by a king called Dharmakara, Manjusri decided to return to the valley as Manjudeva to pay a visit to Sri Tin Jyotirupa Swoyambhu. He brought with him Kasyapa Tathagata. The two of them decided to set up a Vihara in the Valley to teach and advise the people. They set up a vihara called Pim Baha, located in a place thereafter called Manjupattana. In order that the proper worship of himself and Kasyapa Tathagata might be insured he selected a certain acharya, instructed him in the ritual and appointed him and his descendants as official deo palas (priestly attendant, dyah pālā in Newa). Manjusri became known to the people there as Adinath.

"After several generations, disputes arose among the descendants of this Acharya about who had the right to serve as dea palas in the temple. It was finally decided that the dependents would serve in the temple by turn. By this time, it was Kali Yuga and the two deities decided that if they continued to reside in the temple and converse openly and freely with men as they had been doing, the people will eventually give them a lot of trouble. So they decided to disappear into their images and communicate no more with the people except by work, i.e. they would continue to grant favors to the people but would not speak and converse with them. The next morning when the deo pala came to perform the customary worship he found only dumb statues. He began to cry and people gathered. Finally, the relatives of the deo palas held a council and decided that this disaster must be due to some failing of the del palas and killed them all, except for one old man. The old man went up to the temple and rebuked the gods: "What is the use of doing puja to gods like you; my whole family has been destroyed. Henceforth I will not worship you." In a rage, he took out the images and all ornaments and threw the image of Kasyapa Tathagata into the river at Shanti Tirtha and that of Adinath he cast into the river at Arya Tirtha. In the bank of the river one Hem Acharya, was meditating and saw these articles flowing down the river. By force of his Sadhana removed the image of Kasyapa Tathagata from the river, took it to Patan and installed it in a Baha which is called Hemavarna Mahavihara or Kwa Baha.

"The image of Adinath carried on down the river to a place called Jaya Tirtha where a man called Suval Acharya was meditating. Seeing this thing washed along by the river, he realized the life of Adinath Karunamaya and put it into a Kalasa. The life came floating to him in the form of a jasmine flower. Taking the Kalasa to the Kacchapala Hill at Chobhar, he transferred it into an image and called it Anandadi Lokeshvara. At the end of a year, he decided to have an annual bathing ceremony for the image and set the date as the first day of the bright half of the month of Chaitra, the anniversary of the day on which he had removed the life of god from the image in the river."
