= Ranakpur Jain temple =

Jain temple in Rajasthan, India

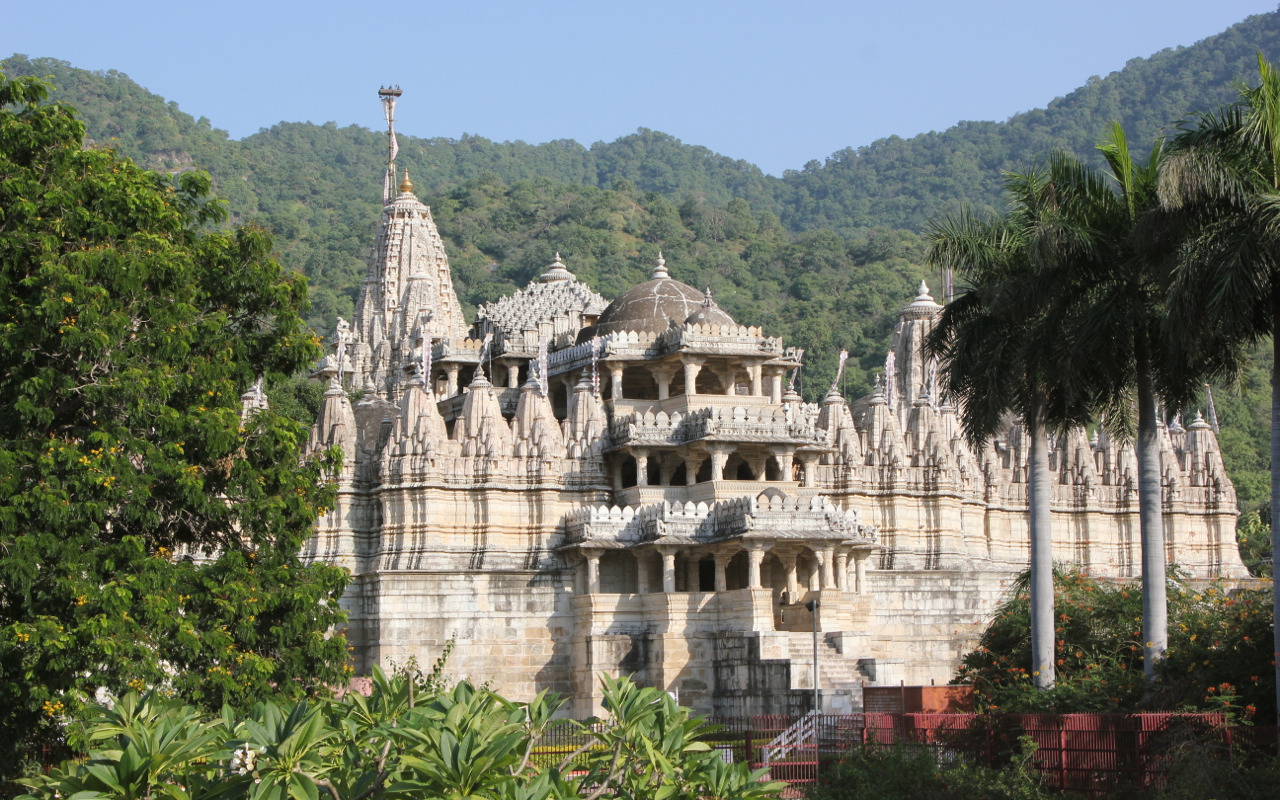
- Chaumukha Jain Temple

- Location within Rajasthan

Religion
- Affiliation: Jainism
- Deity: Rishabhanatha
- Festival: Mahavir Janma Kalyanak
- Governing body: Anandji Kalyanji Trust

Location
- Location: Ranakpur, Rajasthan
- Coordinates: 25°6′56.68″N 73°28′22.19″E

Architecture
- Creator: Dharna Shah
- Established: 1437 CE
- Temple: 7

Website
- www.ranakpurtemple.com

Ranakpur Jain temple or Chaturmukha Dharana Vihara is a Śvētāmbara Jain temple at Ranakpur dedicated to Tirthankara Rishabhanatha. The temple is located in the village of Ranakpur near Sadri in the Pali district of Rajasthan. It is a major pilgrimage place for the Śvetāmbara community.

Seth Dhanna/Dharna Shah, a local Jain businessperson, started construction of the temple in the 15th century after a divine vision. The temple honours Adinath, the first Tirthankar of the present half-cycle (avasarpiṇī) according to Jain cosmology. The Ranakpur temple is one of the largest and most important temples of Jain culture. The campus includes various temples such as Chaumukha temple, Surya temple, Suparshvanatha temple, and Amba temple. Ranakpur along with Muchhal Mahavir, Narlai, Nadol and Varkana forms "Gorwad Panch Tirth".

== Temple history ==
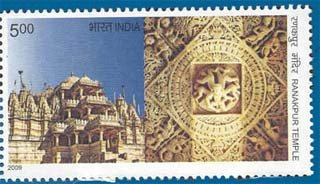
Stamp of Ranakpur Jain temple issued in 2009

The construction is well documented in a 1436 CE copper-plate record, inscriptions in the temple and a Sanskrit text Soma-Saubhagya Kavya. Inspired by a dream of a celestial vehicle, Dharna Shah, a Porwal from Ghanerao, commenced its construction in 1389, under the patronage of Rana Kumbha, then ruler of Mewar. The architect who oversaw the project was named Dwepa. There is an inscription on a pillar near the main shrine stating that in 1439 Deepaka, an architect, constructed the temple at the direction of Dharanka, a devoted Jain. When the ground floor was completed, Acharya Somsundar Suri of Tapa Gaccha supervised the ceremonies, which are described in Soma-Saubhagya Kavya. The construction continued until 1458 CE. However, according to the audio guide provided to visitors to the site, construction lasted fifty years (and involved 2785 workers). Another source reports that construction continued until 1496, fifty years from 1446. The town of Ranakpur and the temple are named after the provincial ruler monarch, Rana Kumbha who supported the construction of the temple.

== Architecture ==
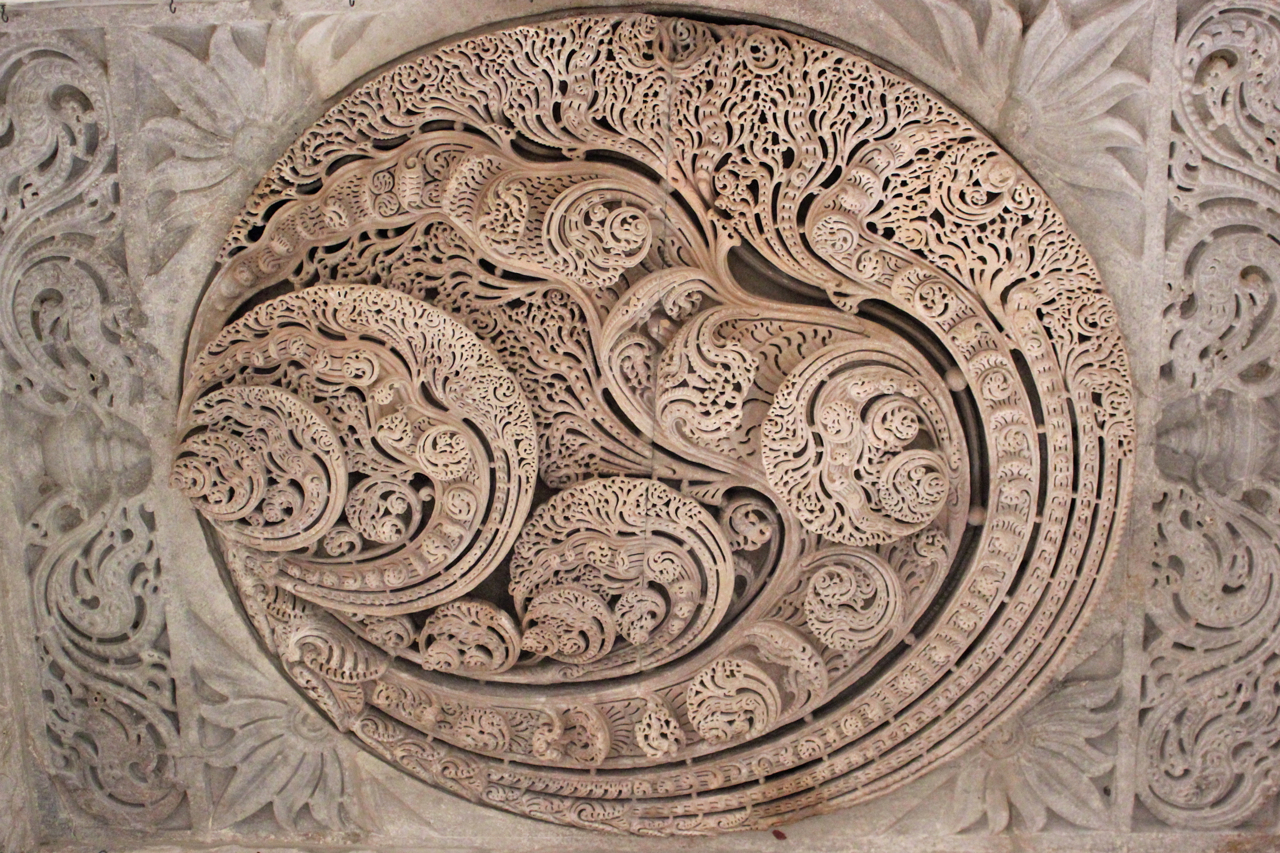
Depiction of Kalpavriksha

Whilst Dilwara temples are known for their sculptural work, this temple is famous for its intricate carvings and unique architecture. It was built in the form of Nalini-Gulma Vimana(a heavenly vehicle Dharna Shah saw in his dreams). This temple is built in Māru-Gurjara architecture.

The temple has a garbhagriha in which the main Chaumukha Adinatha idol is placed. The four openings of the sanctum lead to rangamandapa— the Dancing hall, which is connected to a two-storeyed mandapa, which is again connected to another two-storeyed mandapa called Balana and nalimandapa. This courtyard is surrounded by a wall enclosing sub-shrines. The wall is also exclusive on projections like devakulikas and minor deity. The temple has five shikharas amongst which the central one is the largest. The temple is rich with sculptural pieces - carvings created with great skill and artistry.

The Shikhara in the temple is symbolic of Mount Meru, the mountain which forms the axis of Jambudvipa with a preaching hall as the Samavasarana.

== Main temple ==
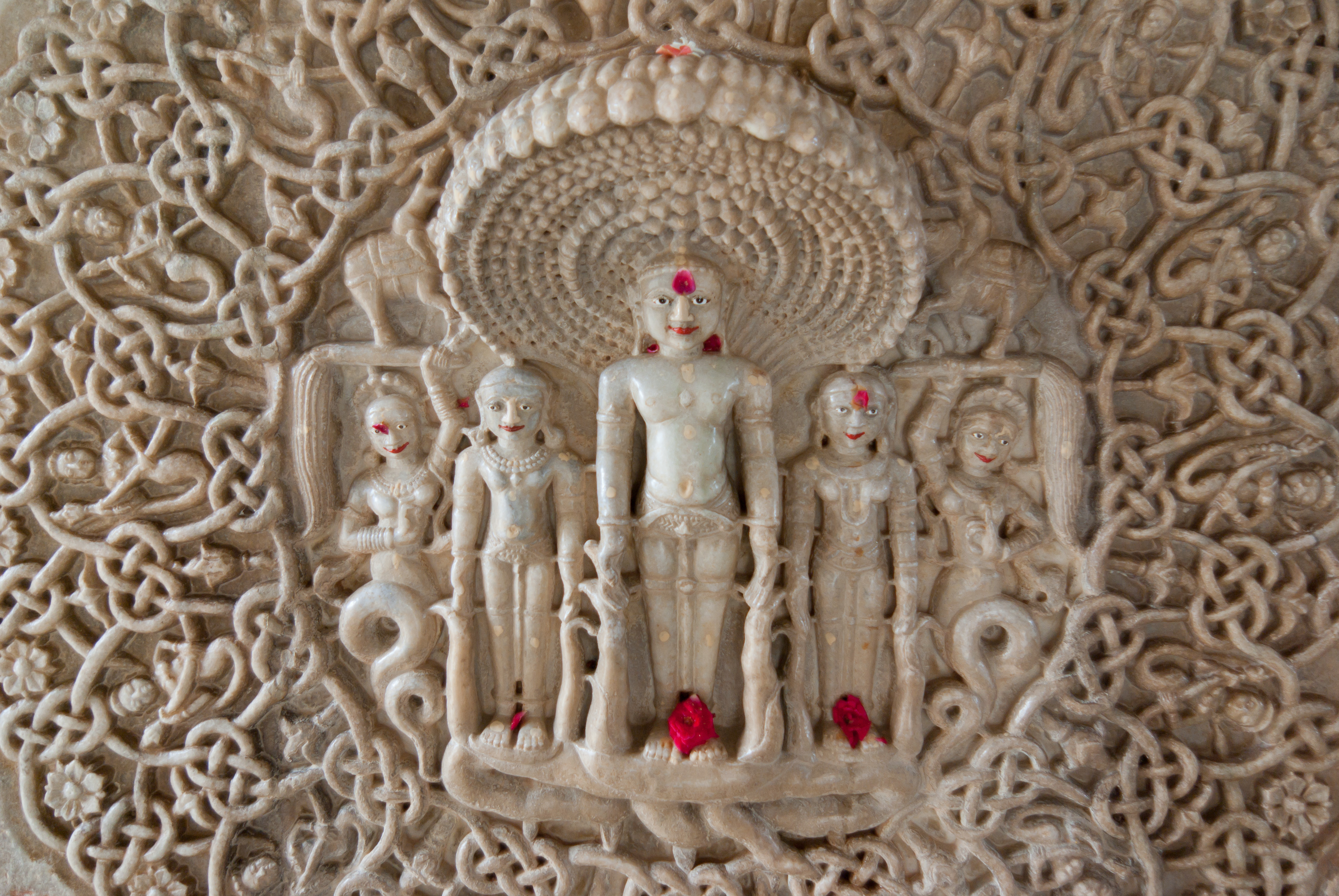
Parshvanatha with 1008 serpent head

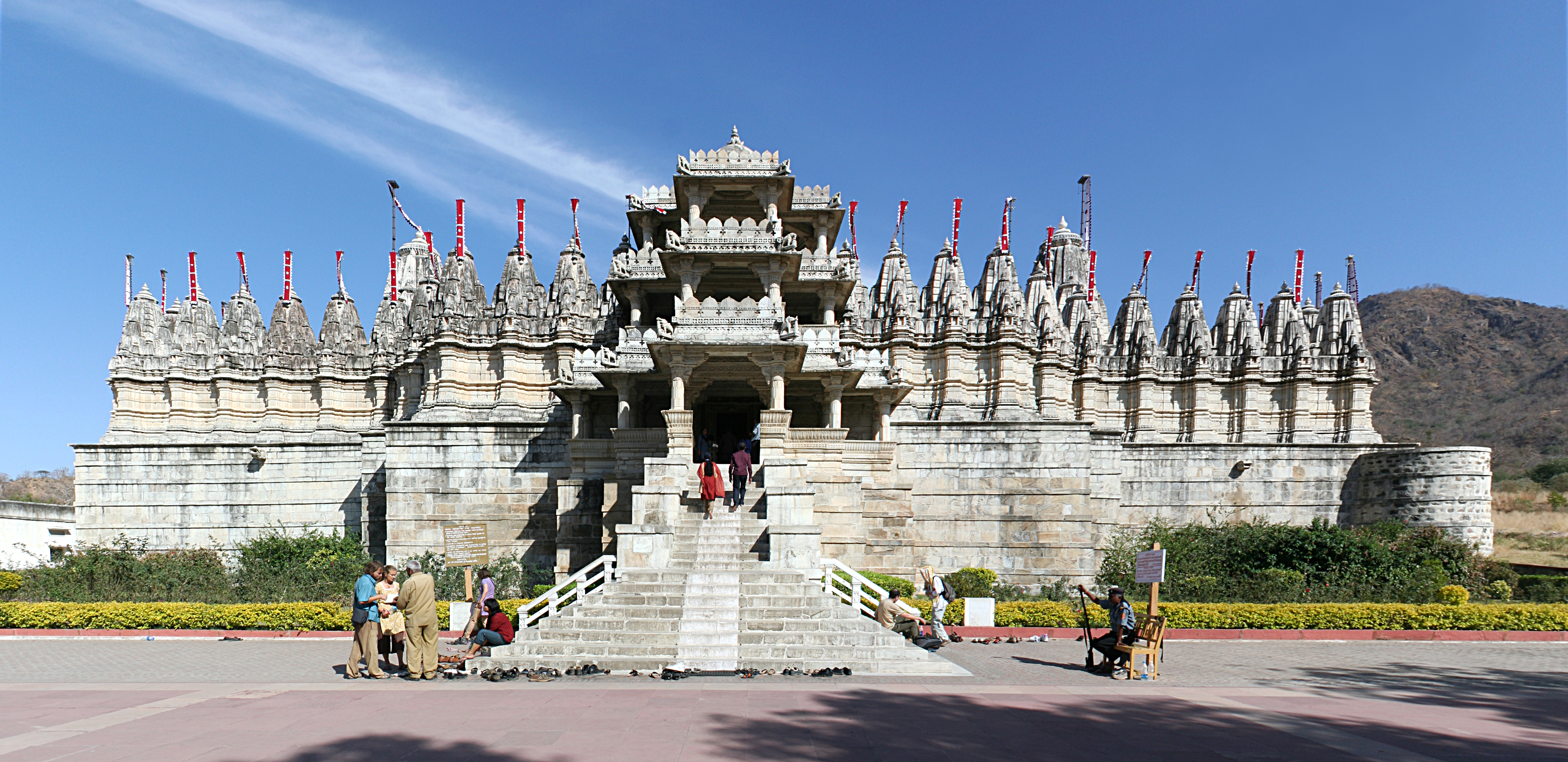
Front view of Chaturmukha temple

Chaturmukha temple is a 15th-century temple dedicated to Adinatha built using white marble in the midst of a forest. The temple name is credited to its design of chaumukha— with four faces. The construction of the temple and quadrupled image symbolise the Tirthankara's conquest of the four cardinal directions and hence the cosmos. The temple is one of the largest Jain temples and considered one of the five holiest Jain shrines in India and part of Gorwad Panch Tirth. The architecture and stone carvings of the temple are based on the Ancient Mirpur Jain Temple at Mirpur in Rajasthan.

The temple is a grand white marble structure spread over 48,000 square feet (4,500 m^{2}) with 1444 marble pillars, twenty-nine halls, eighty domes and 426 columns. One pillar is incomplete and legend says every time it is built the next morning the pillar breaks down again. The temple, with its distinctive domes, shikhara, turrets and cupolas rises majestically from the slope of a hill. The 1444 marble pillars, carved in exquisite detail, support the temple. The pillars are individually carved and no two pillars are the same. Legend says that it is impossible to count the pillars. One of the pillars bears the carving mother of a tirthankar lying on a cot. In the axis of the main entrance, on the western side, is the largest image. Inside the garbhagriha, the moolnayak of this temple, there is a 6-ft. tall, white-coloured chaumukha idol of Adinath with four heads facing in four directions. Temple has a total of 84 bhonyra (underground chambers) built to protect the Jain idols from the Mughals.

The temple is famous for its beautiful carved idol of Parshvanatha made out of a single marble slab. The idol has 1008 snake heads and numerous tails. Two chauri bearers and Yaksha and yakshi, half-human and half-snake, stand on either side. There are two elephants purifying Parshvanatha. One cannot find the end of the tails. The temple also has a representation of Ashtapad, showing eight tirthanakars in a row, Girnar and Nandishwar Dvipa.

The design of the temple inspired Pittalhar temple, Dilwara in 1459 CE and in the Palitana temple complex in 1681.

== Other temples ==
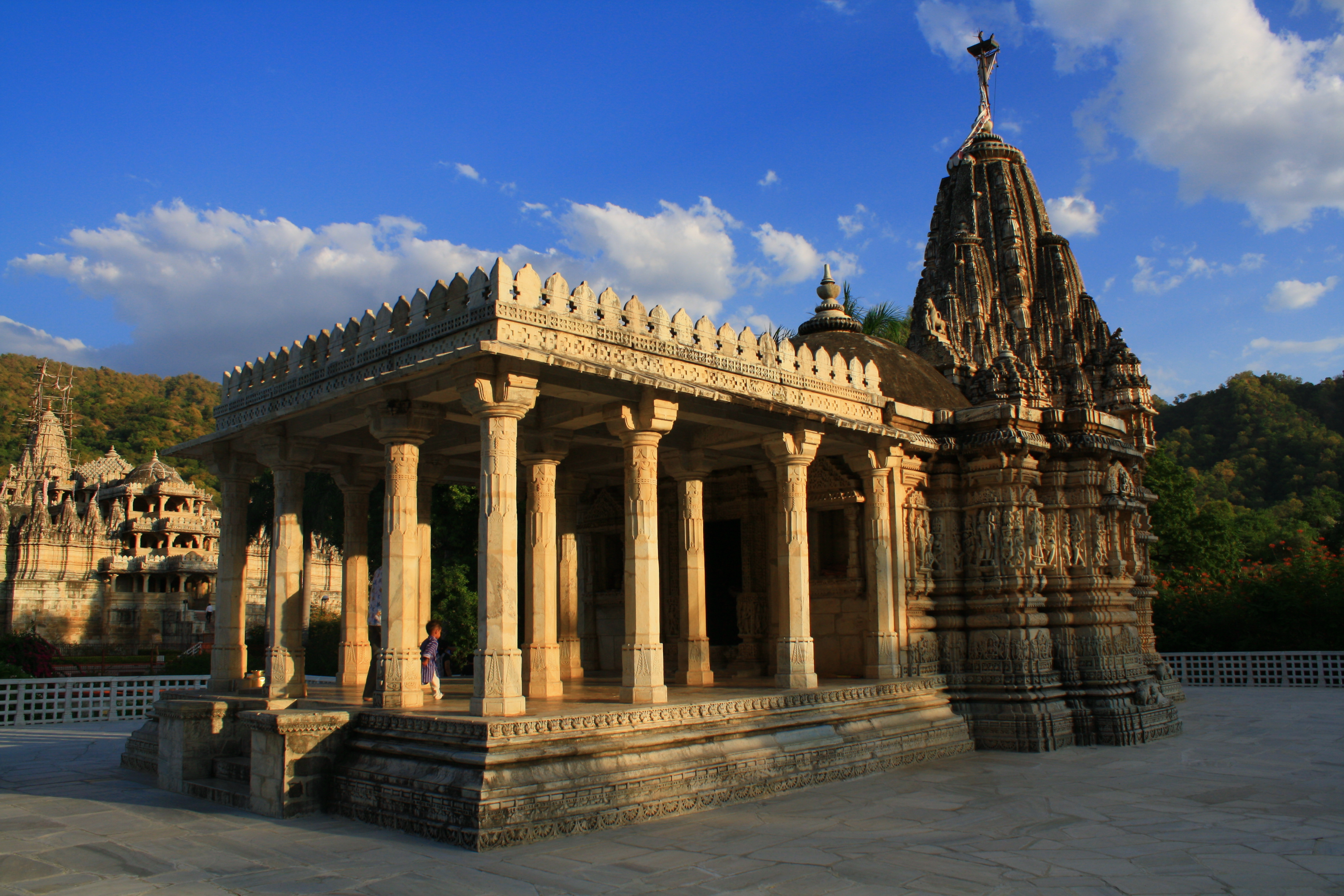
Parshvanatha Temple at Ranakpur

Parshvanatha temple

A temple dedicated to Suparshvanatha is also present here. The temple has an intrinsic design and this temple is also famous for erotic arts on the wall.

Neminatha temple

There is a temple dedicated to Neminatha with exquisite carvings.

Mahavir temple

This is a 17th-century Jain temple dedicated to Mahavira. The temple features a massive dome structure with highly decorated pillars and ceiling.

== Management ==
The temple underwent several renovations. The last renovation was carried out at the beginning of the 20th century by Anandji Kalyanji Pedhi, which was appreciated by the Archaeological Survey of India in their 1907-08 annual report. The temple has been managed by the Anandji Kalyanji Pedhi trust. The temple has a dharmshala and bhojanashala for benefit of pilgrims.

== Picture gallery ==
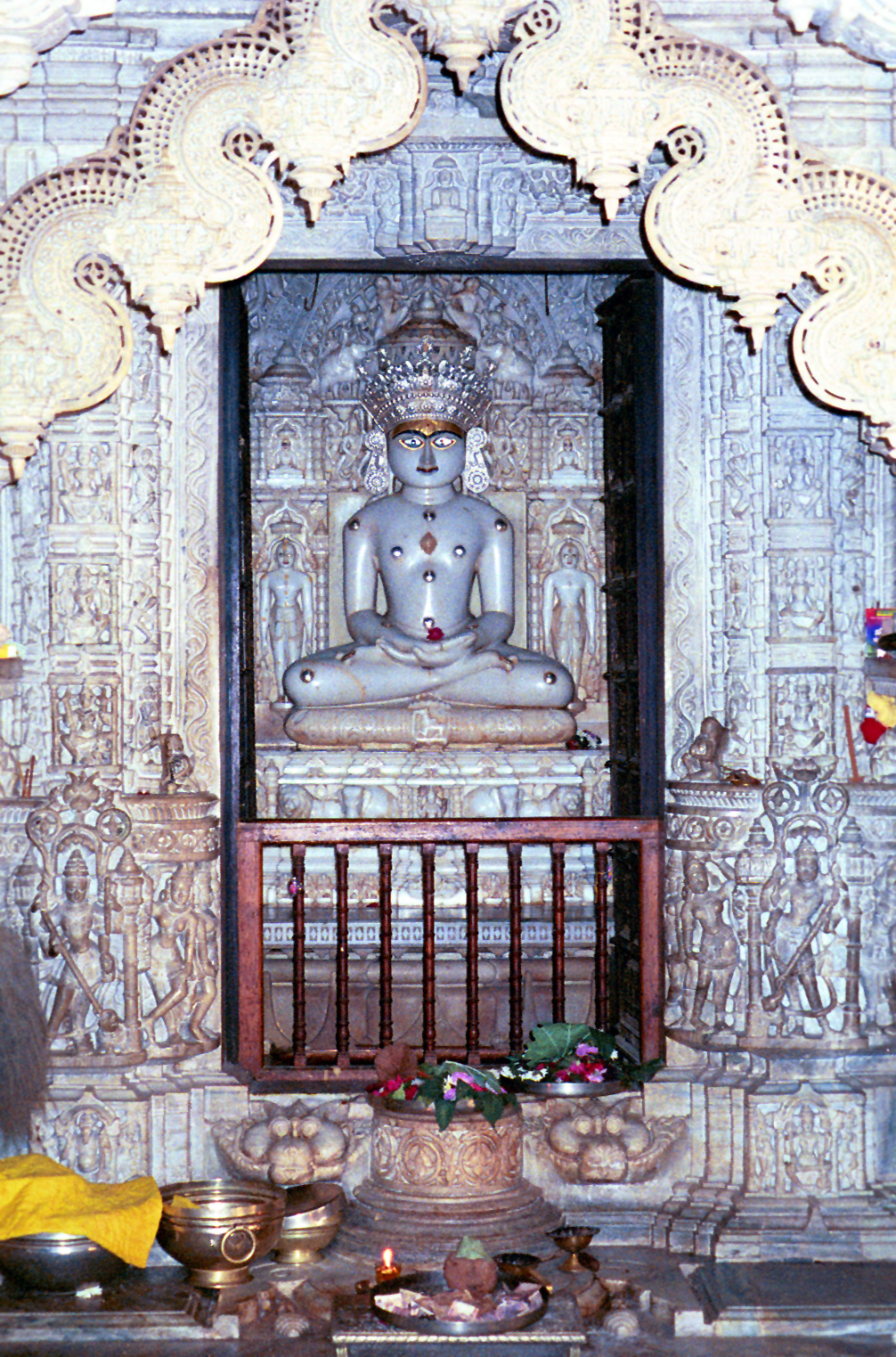
Idol of Adinath

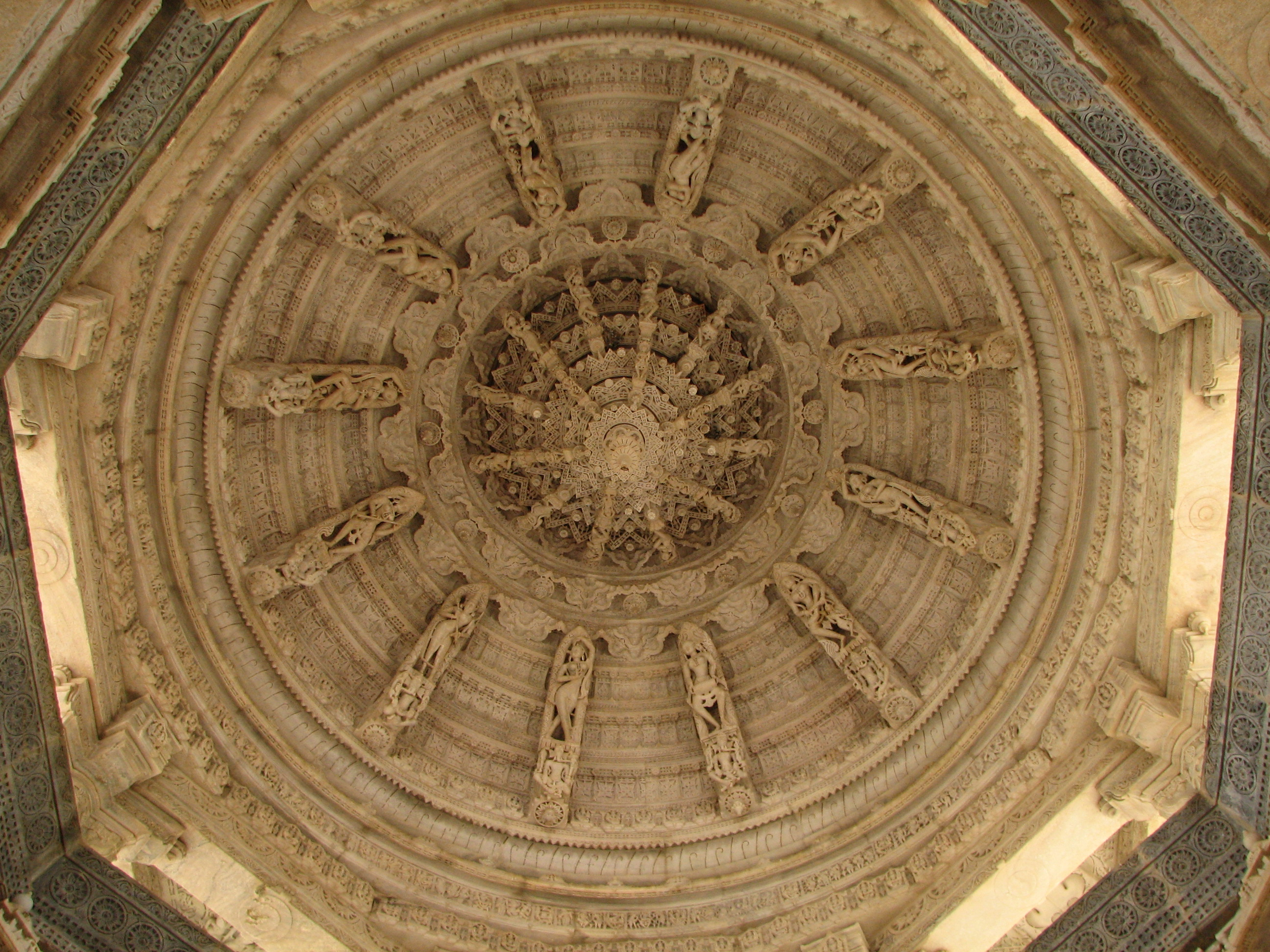
Ceiling Details

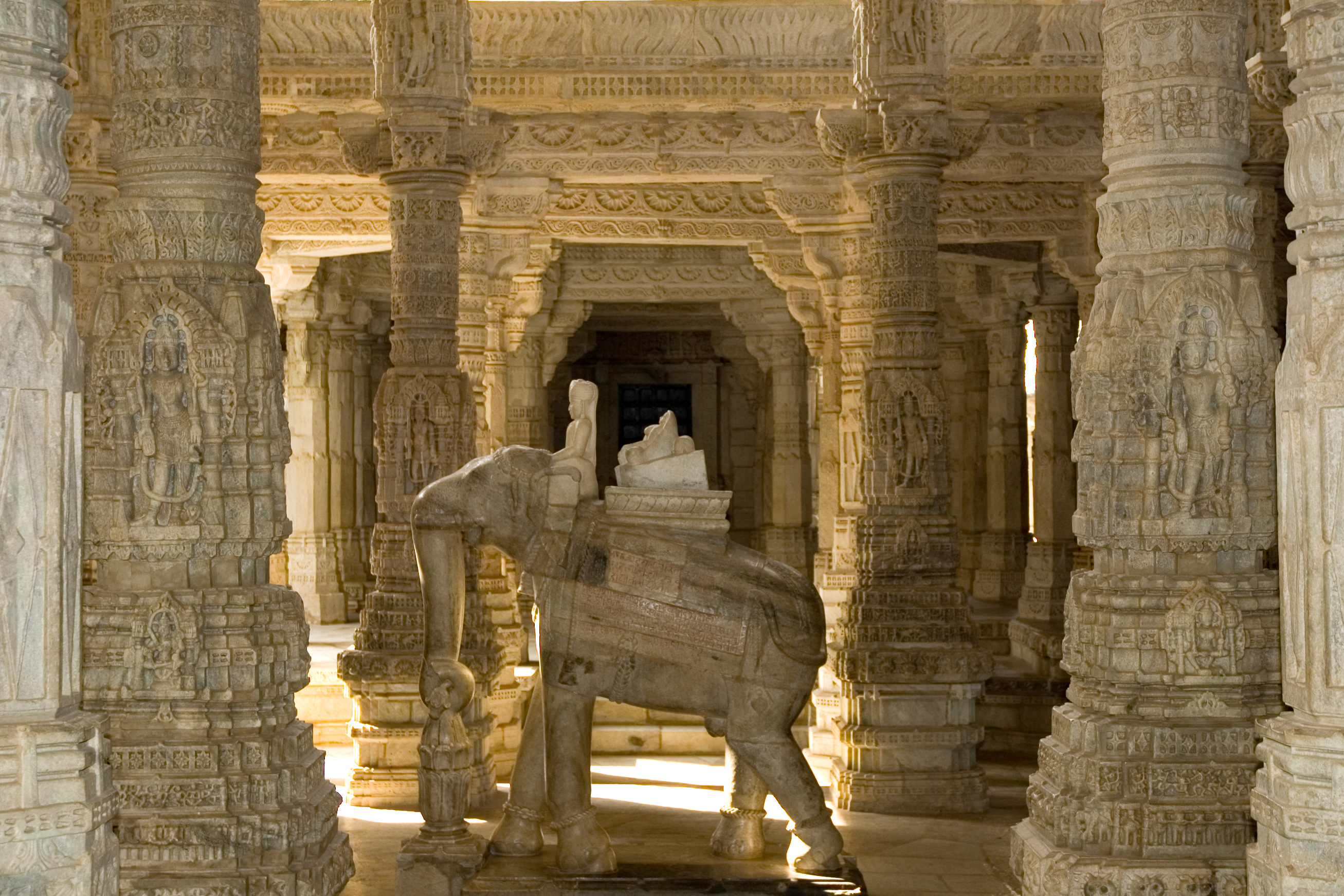
Detailed carving of an elephant

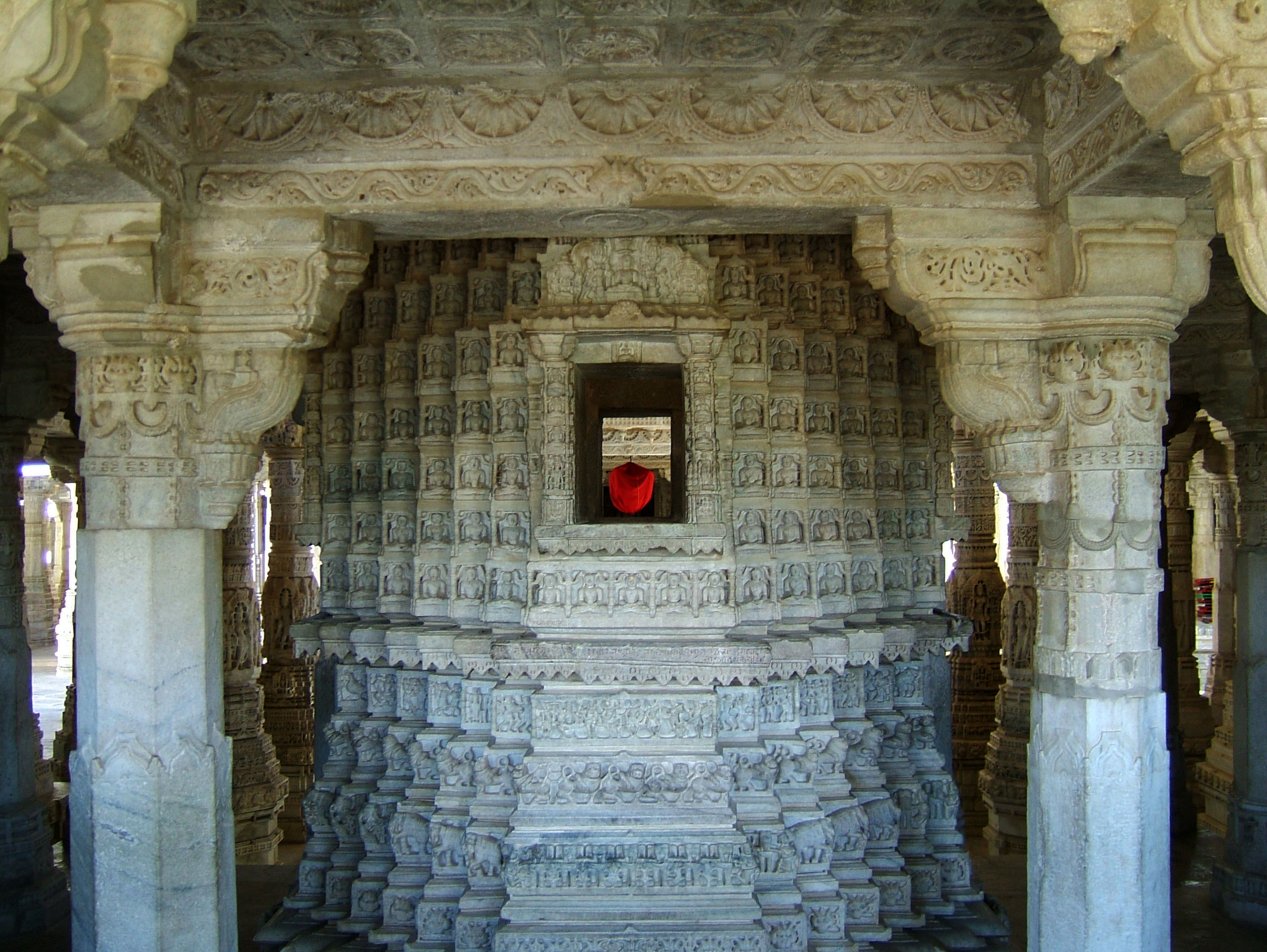
Main shrine

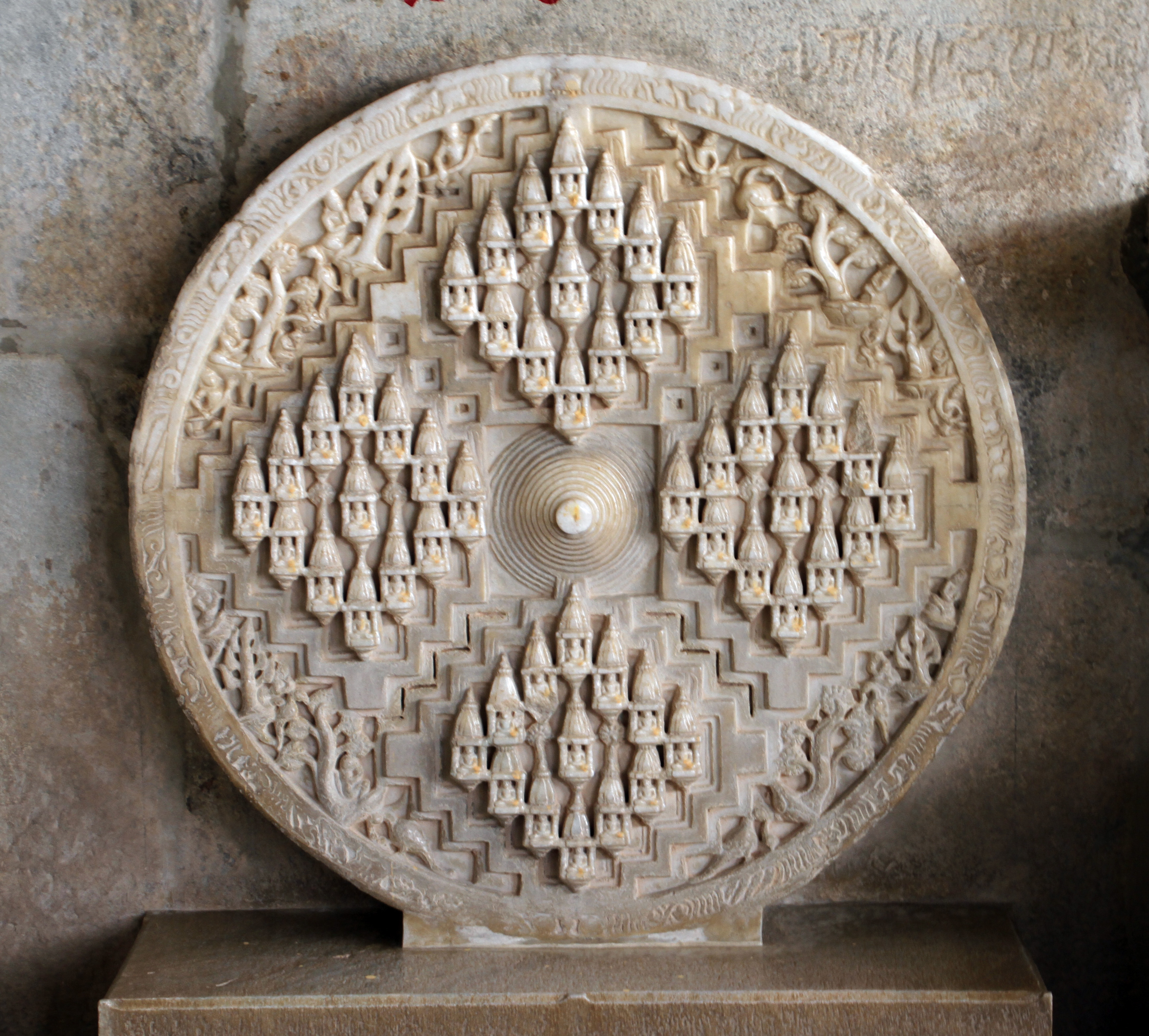
Jambudvipa Rachna

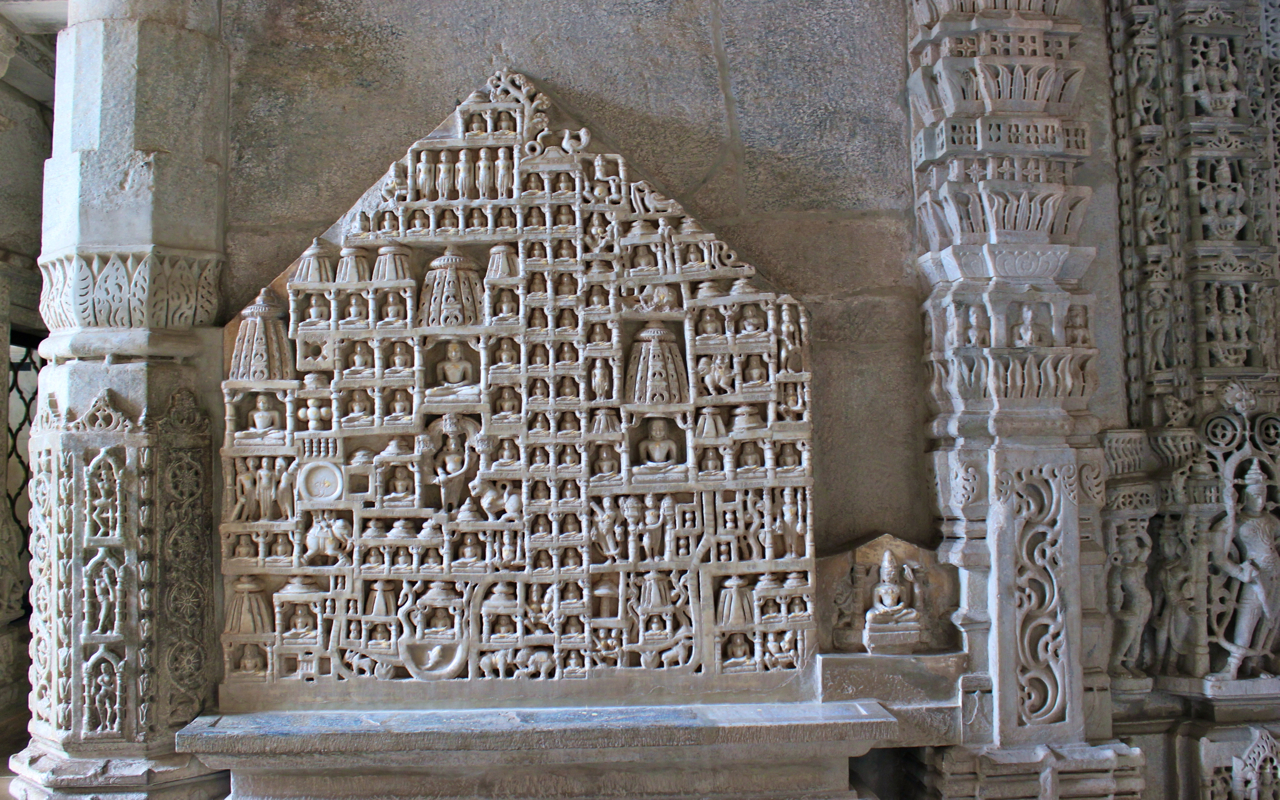
The iconic representation of Palitana temples on Mt. Shatrunjaya and Girnar Jain temples

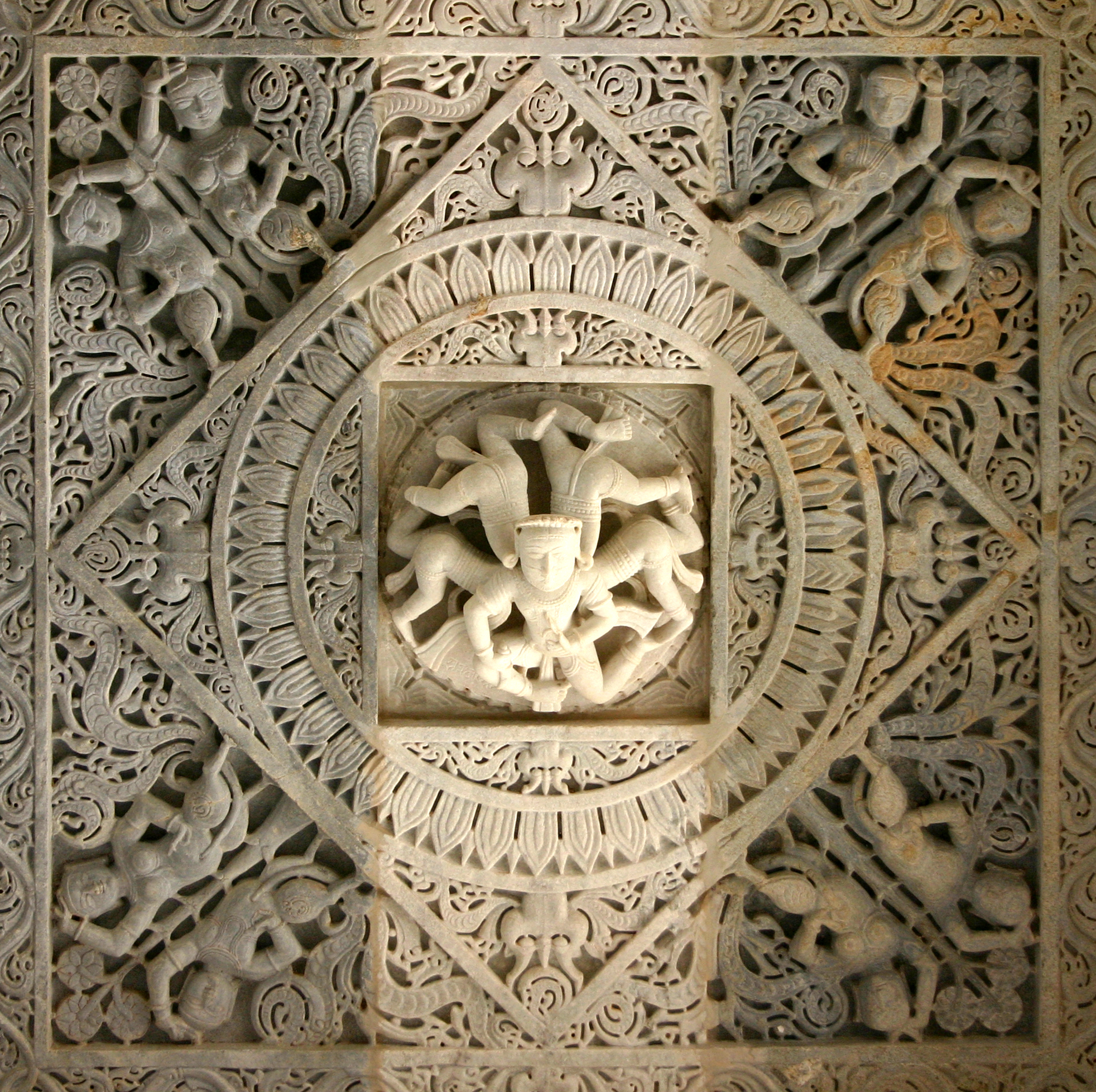
The depiction of akichaka, a bearded man with five bodies representing the five elements.

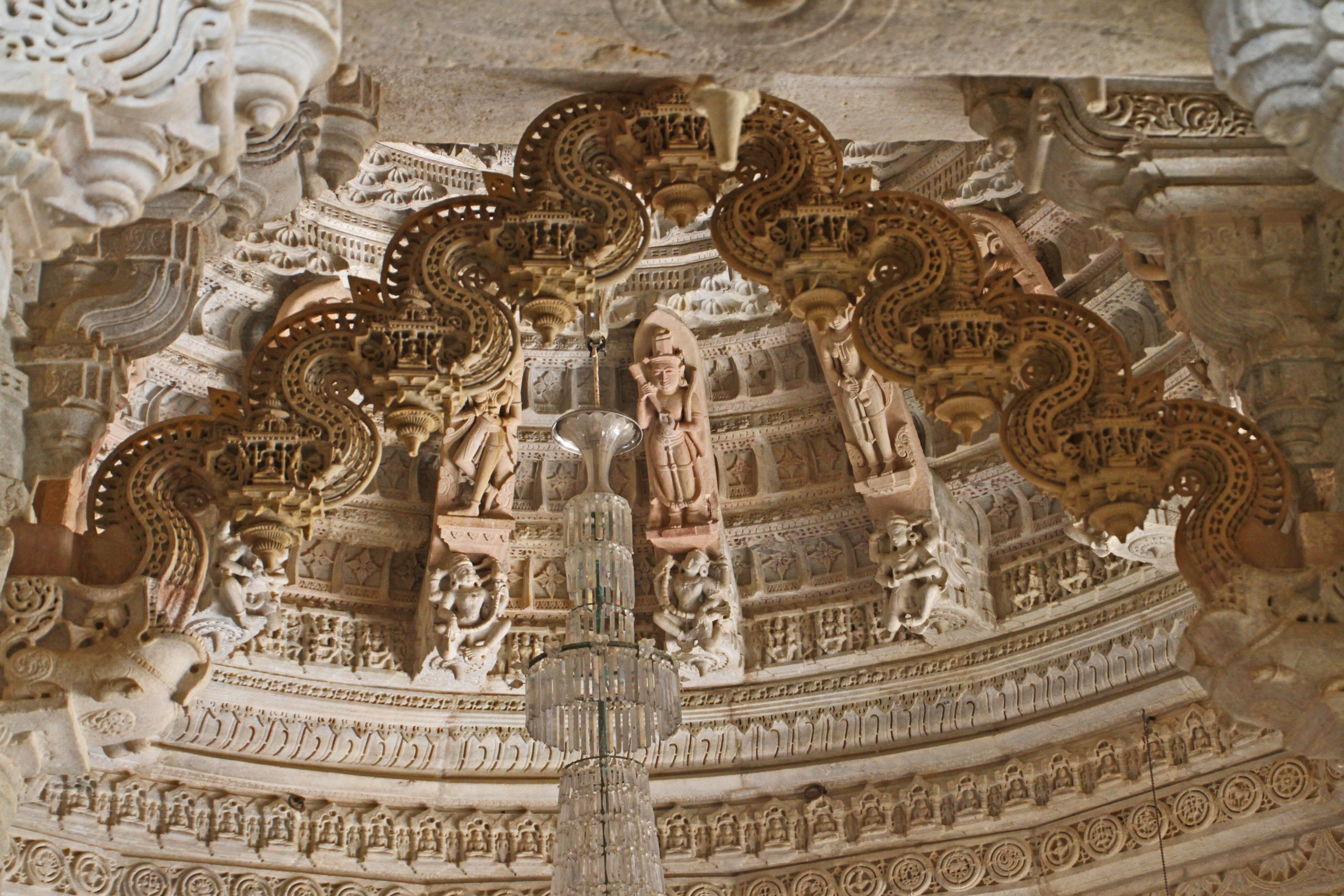
Intricate carvings of Vidyadevis

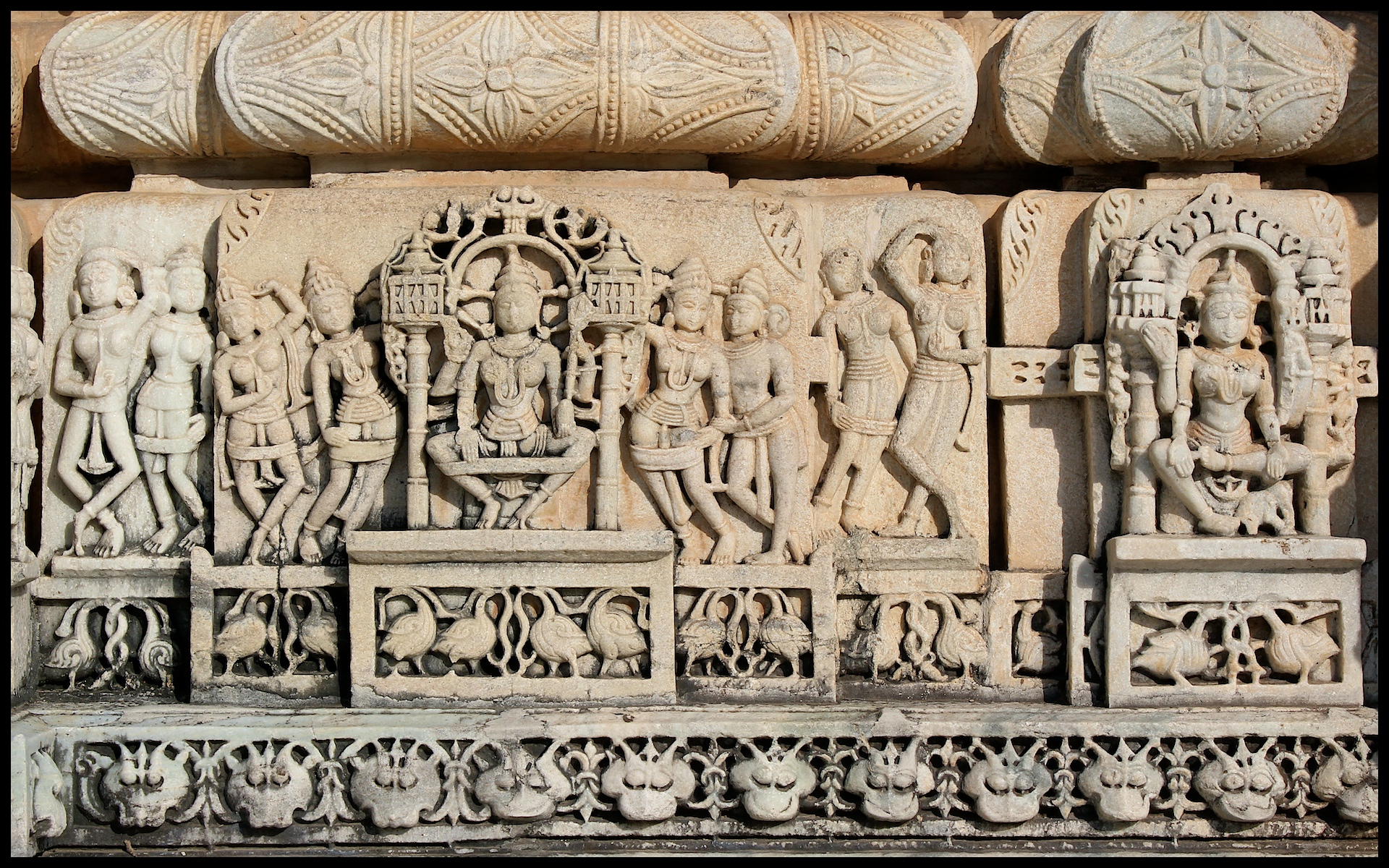
Shasan devis and goddesses

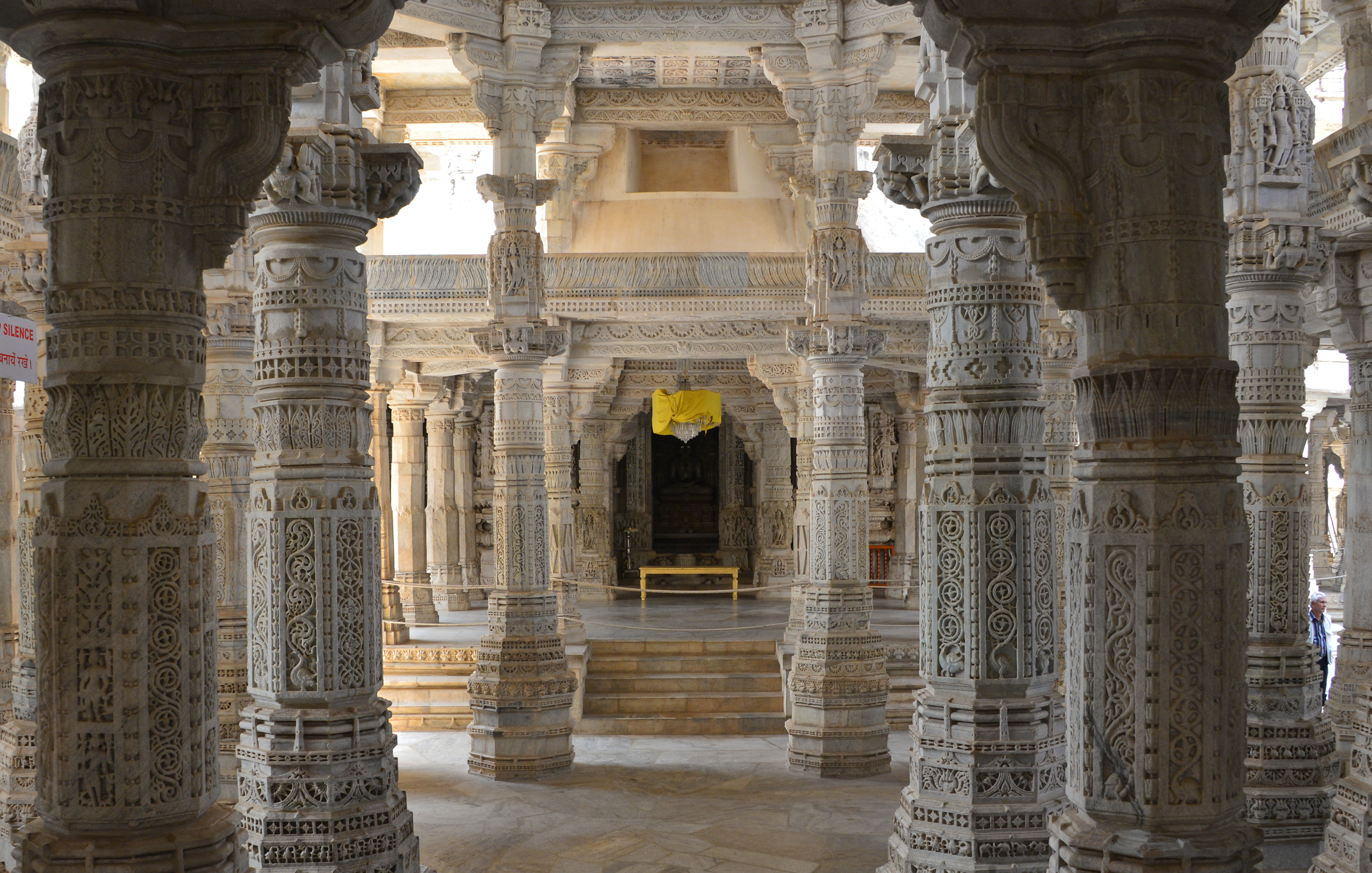
Pillars inside the temple

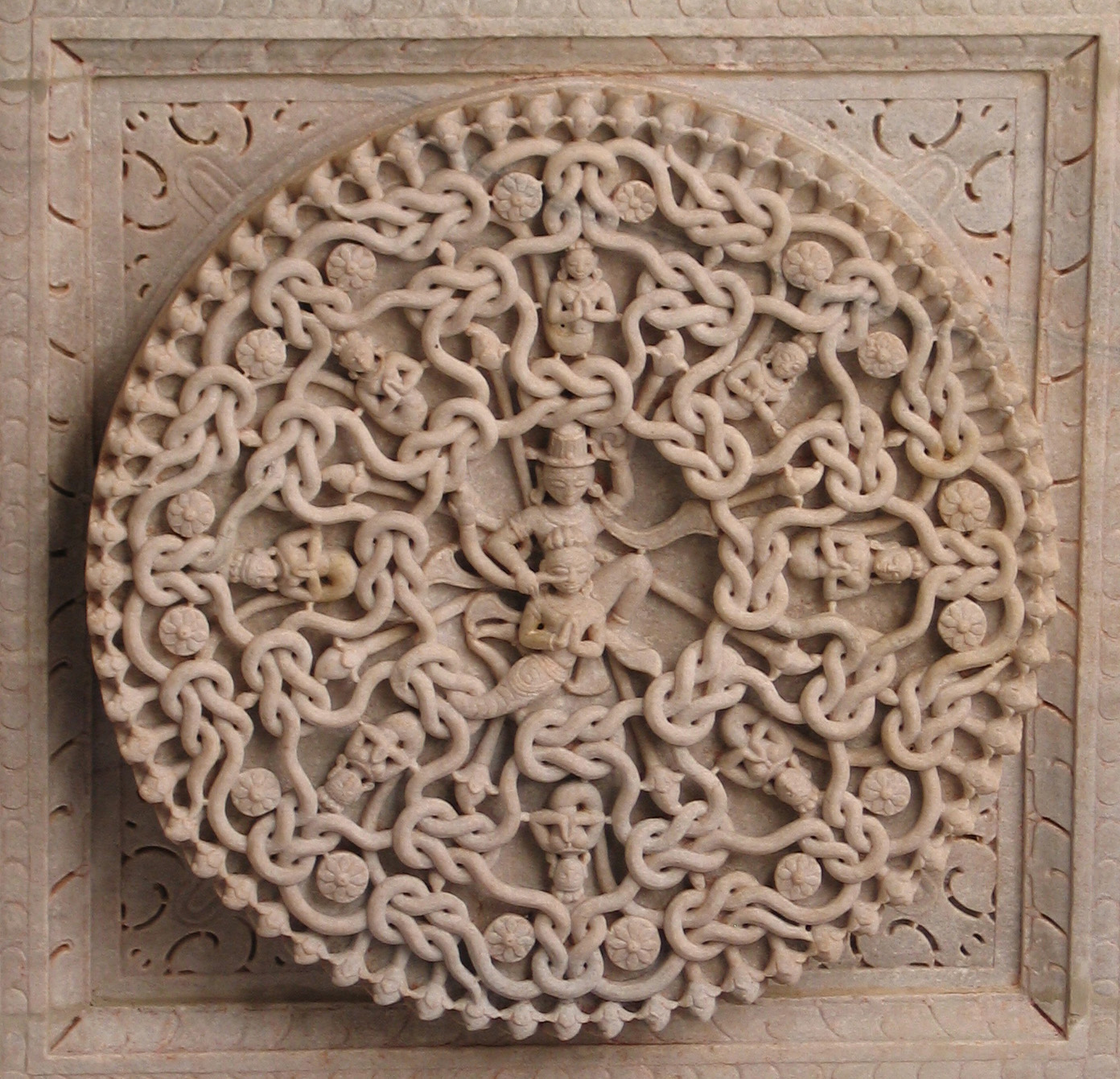
Karma, Ceiling Sculpture (Shapes and Knots connected to each other to depict the connection between Karma and Life)

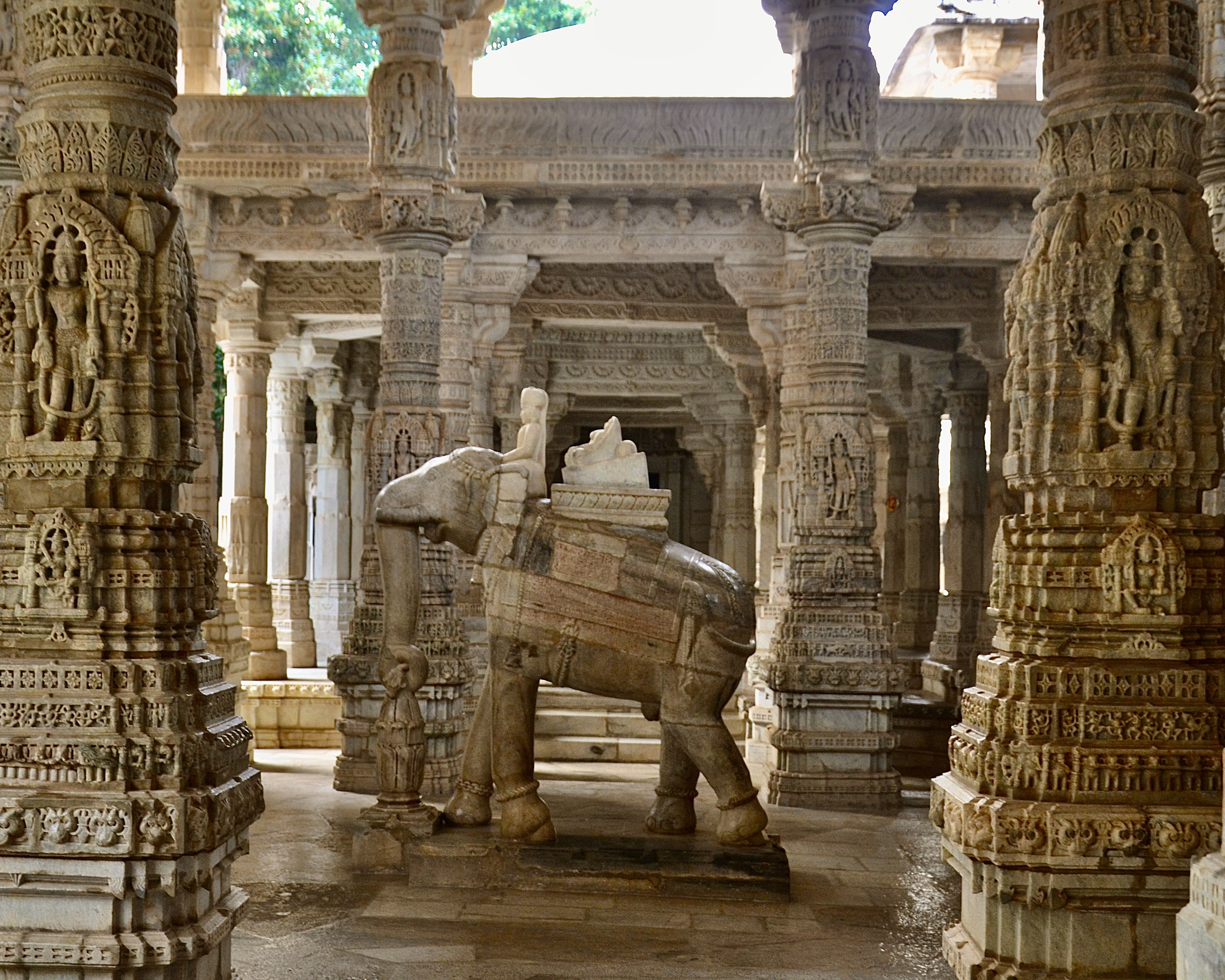
Elephant and its rider, Marudevi, the mother of Rishabhanatha

== See also ==
- Dilwara Temples
- Nagarparkar Jain Temples
- Jainism in Rajasthan
- Kesariyaji
