= Vinayak Adinath Buwa =

Indian Marathi-language writer

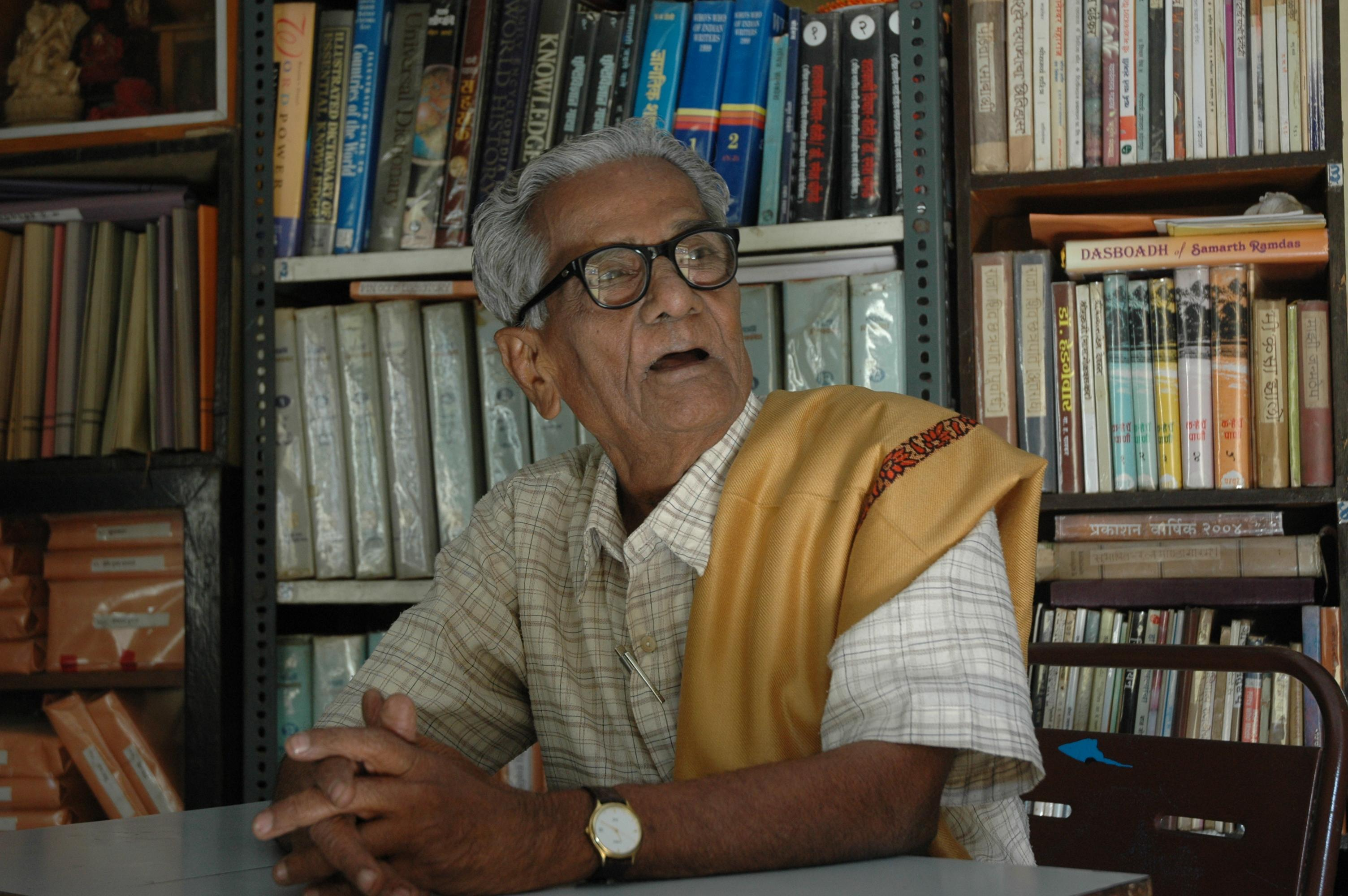
- Born: 4 July 1925; Maharashtra, India
- Died: 17 April 2011 (aged 85); Maharashtra, India
- Occupation: Writer
- Writing career
- Language: Marathi
- Years active: c. 1950–2011
- Genres: Humor, satire, essays

Vinayak Adinath Buwa (also known as V. A. Buwa, (born July 4, 1925, died April 17, 2011) was a Marathi writer from Maharashtra, India, known for his humorous stories and articles.

The following are some collections of his work:

- मराठी my बोली
- नवर्‍यांवर पी एच डी
- एक ना धड विविध विनोदी साहित्य
- खोडाल तर टिकाल
- चमचा चमचा ओळख
- अरेच्चा, एवढं वाढलंय
