= Roads in Pali district =

The roads' detail of Pali district is as given below.

== National Highways ==
Three National Highways pass through the district are:

- NH14 (178 km) [Amarpura to Sumerpur],
- NH65 (40.70 km) [ Jodhpur to Pali]
- NH112 (40 km) [Bar to Bilara] and
- NH325 (19 km) [ Takhatgarh to Sanderao].

== State Highways ==
State Highways pass through the district are:

- SH-16 (79 km) [Chawa to Amritia (NH 8) via Sindhari, Jalore, Takhatgarh, Sanderao, Falna, Sadri, Desuri ]
- SH-32 (12 km) [ Sadri (SH-16-62) to Banswara via Ranakpur, Gogunda, Udaipur ]
- SH-39 (40 km) [ Satur (NH 12) to Mundwa via Jahajpur, Shahpura, Vijaynagar, Beawar, Merta City, Lambia, Merta Road, Khajwana]
- SH-58 (84 km) [ Jodhpur to Bheem up to NH-8 via Vinakiya, Rajola, Sojat City, Rendiri, Bhaisana, Sojat Road, Kantaliya, Baban]
- SH-61 (94 km) [ Phalodi ( NH 15) to Mandal via Osian, Mathania, Jodhpur, Khejrali, Bhatenda, Saradasamand, Jadan, Marwar Junction, Aauwa, Jojawar, Kamalighat, Devgarh, Rajaji ka kareda]
- SH-62 (166 km) [ Bilara to Pindwara via Sojat City, Sireeyari, Jojawar, Bagol, Desuri, Sadri, Sewari ]
- SH-64 (46 km) [ Rohat (NH 65) to Ahore (SH-16) via Vasi, Bhadrajun and
- SH-67 (87 km) [Sardar Samand (SH-61) to Desuri (SH-62) via Pali, Ramsiya, Somesar, Nadol ].

== Major District Roads ==
While Major District Roads are:

- MDR-13 (40 km) [ Pali (NH-14) to Mokalsar via Roopawas, Bhawanri, Kulthana, Bhadarajun]
- MDR-24 (25 km) [ Jaitaran (NH-112) to Khoor (SH-8A) via Lambia, Merta City, Degana, Tarneu, Deedwana, Sikar, Raghunathgarh]
- MDR-40 (25 km), [ Nadol (SH-67) to Sadri (SH-16)]
- MDR-91 (56 km), [ Bilara (NH-112) to Marwar Junction Rly Stn via Jetiwas, Tharsami Meo, Sojat city, Dhinawas, Naga ki Beri, Dudod]
- MDR-105 (51 km) [Chanod to Mundara (SH-16) via Kenpura, Rani ] and
- MDR-106 (12 km) [ Bali (SH-16) to Sewari (SH-62) via Boyal].
