= State Highway 61 (Rajasthan) =

State Highway in Rajasthan

State Highway 61
- State Highway 61 in red

Route information
- Length: 349 km (217 mi)

Major junctions
- West end: Phalodi, Jodhpur District, Rajasthan
- East end: Mandal, Bhilwara District, Rajasthan

Location
- Country: India
- State: Rajasthan
- Districts: Rajasthan: Jodhpur district, Pali district Rajsamand district and Bhilwara district
- Primary destinations: Osian, Mathania, Jodhpur, Khejrali, Bhatenda, Saradasamand, Jadan, Marwar Junction, Auwa, Jojawar, Kamalighat, Devgarh, Nimbahera Jatan, Rajaji ka kareda.

Highway system
- Roads in India; Expressways; National; State; Asian; State Highways in Rajasthan

State Highway 61 (RJ SH 61) is a state highway in Rajasthan state of India that connects Phalodi in Jodhpur district of Rajasthan with Mandal in Bhilwara district of Rajasthan. The total length of RJ SH 61 is 349 km.

This highway connects NH 15 in Phalodi to NH 79 in Mandal. It meets National Highway 65, National Highway 112 and National Highway 114 in Jodhpur, National Highway 14 in Jadan and National Highway 8 in Kamalighat. It also meets RJ SH 68 in Khejrali, RJ SH 67 in Sardarsamand, RJ SH 62 in Jojawar and RJ SH 56 in Devgarh.

Other cities and towns on this highway are: Lordiyan, Lohawat, Osian, Umednagar, Mathania, Jodhpur, Khejrali, Bhatenda, Saradasamand, Jadan, Marwar Junction, Auwa, Jojawar, Kamalighat, Devgarh, Nimbahera Jatan, Rajaji ka kareda, Bemali and Bhagwanpura.

== See also ==
- List of state highways in Rajasthan
- Roads in Pali district
