= Panota =

Village In Rajasthan, India

Coordinates: 25°27′22″N 73°40′49″E

Panota is a village located in the Desuri tehsil in the Pali district of Rajasthan, India. It is located near Sadri town on state highway SH 62 between Jojawar and Bagol and Kot Solankiyan, in a valley on the western side of the Aravalli Range. Panota is easily accessed by road from Jojawar and Khinwara to Desuri. It was one of the affluent villages of wealthy people but was looted by robbers long time back, though today a lot of its population have migrated to cities for their bread earning activities and the village has very few open homes, a few settled in Mumbai and the rest in Tamil Nadu & Karnataka.
