= State Highway 58 (Rajasthan) =

Road in Rajasthan, India

State Highway 58

Route information
- Length: 181 km (112 mi)

Major junctions
- West end: Jodhpur, Rajasthan
- East end: Bheem, Rajsamand District, Rajasthan

Location
- Country: India
- State: Rajasthan
- Districts: Rajasthan: Jodhpur district, Pali district, Ajmer district and Rajsamand district
- Primary destinations: विनकिया, मंडोर, जोधपुर, सरदार समंद, जाड़न, सोजत, सोजत रोड, कँटालिया, झींझारड़ी, बभान ., बड़ाखेड़ा, भीम

Highway system
- Roads in India; Expressways; National; State; Asian; State Highways in Rajasthan

ककेलाओ में अनेक लोग रहते हैं पर सबसे उच्च राजपुरोहित है जो राजपुरोहित सोथडा हे वह धीरज सिंह राजपुरोहित जो पेशे से एक यूट्यूबर हैं वो भी रहते हैं।

State Highway 58 (RJ SH 58) is a state highway in Rajasthan state of India that connects Jodhpur of Rajasthan with Bheem in Rajsamand district of Rajasthan. The total length of RJ SH 58 is 141.50 km.

This highway connects NH 65 in Jodhpur to NH 8 in Bheem of Rajsamand district. It meets National Highway 112 in Binawas and National Highway 14 in Sojat. It also meets RJ SH 63 in Daikra, RJ SH 21 near Binawas and RJ SH 62 in Sojat Road.

Other cities and towns on this highway are: Vinayakiya, kakelav, Rajola Kallan, Chadwas, Rupawas, Sojat, Rendari, Bhaisana, Sojat Road, Kantaliya and Baban.

== See also ==
- List of state highways in Rajasthan
- Roads in Pali district
