= State Highway 62 (Rajasthan) =

Road in Rajasthan, India

State Highway 62

Route information
- Length: 187 km (116 mi)

Major junctions
- North end: Bilara, Jodhpur District, Rajasthan
- South end: Pindwara, Sirohi District, Rajasthan

Location
- Country: India
- State: Rajasthan
- Districts: Rajasthan: Jodhpur district, Pali district and Sirohi district
- Primary destinations: Sojat, Sojat Road, Sireeyari, Phulad, Jojawar, Bagol, Desuri, Sadri, Lunawa, Sewari, Bijapur, Bera and Chamunderi.

Highway system
- Roads in India; Expressways; National; State; Asian; State Highways in Rajasthan

State Highway 62 (RJ SH 62) is a State Highway in Rajasthan state of India that connects Bilara in Jodhpur district of Rajasthan with Pindwara in Sirohi district of Rajasthan. The total length of RJ SH 62 is 187 km.

This highway connects NH 112 in Bilara to NH 62 and NH 27 in Pindwara. It also meets National Highway 14 in Sojat and Pindwara. Other cities and towns on this highway are: Sojat, Sojat Road, Sireeyari, Phulad, Jojawar, Bagol, Desuri, Ghanerao, Sadri, Lunawa, Sewari, Bijapur, Bera and Chamunderi.

== See also ==
- List of state highways in Rajasthan
- Roads in Pali district
