= Kot Solankiyan =

Kot Solankiyan Kot panota
- village
- Location in Rajasthan, India Kot Solankiyan (India)
- Coordinates: 25.4333°N 73.6833°E
- Country: India
- State: Rajasthan
- District: Pali, Rajasthan

Population (2001)
  - Total: 1,691

Languages
  - Official: Hindi
- Time zone: UTC+5:30 (IST)
- Postal code: 306022
- ISO 3166 code: RJ-IN
- Vehicle registration: RJ-22

Kot Solankiyan is a village located in the Desuri tehsil in the Pali district of Rajasthan, India. It is located near Sadri town on State Highway 62 between Jojawar and Bagol, in a valley on the western side of the Aravalli Range. Kot is easily accessed by road from Jojawar, Desuri and Dewair.
