= Green bee-eater =

Green bee-eater has been split into the following species:

- Asian green bee-eater, Merops orientalis
- African green bee-eater, Merops viridissimus
- Arabian green bee-eater, Merops cyanophrys
