= Sojat Road railway station =

Railway station in Rajasthan, India

Sojat Road
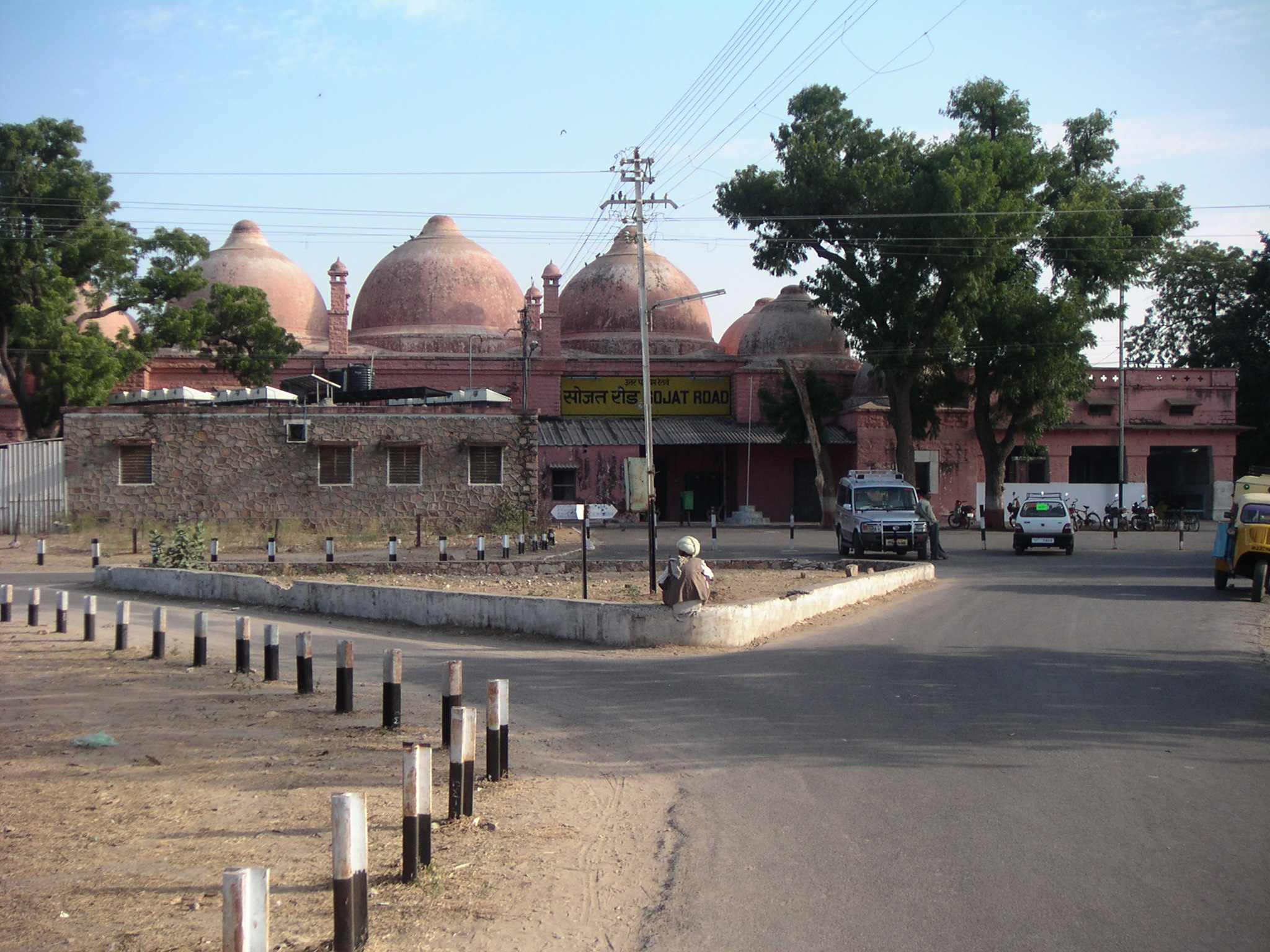
- The station in 2008

General information
- Location: Sojat Road, Pali district, Rajasthan; India
- Coordinates: 25.860745°N 73.754290°E
- Elevation: 295 metres (968 ft)
- System: Indian Railways
- Owner: Indian Railways
- Operator: North Western Railway
- Line: Jaipur–Ahmedabad line
- Platforms: 2
- Tracks: 2

Construction
- Structure type: Standard (on ground station)
- Parking: Yes

Other information
- Status: Functioning
- Station code: SOD
- Zone(s): North Western Railway
- Division(s): Ajmer
Location
- Location within India Location within Rajasthan

Sojat Road railway station is a railway station in Pali district, Rajasthan. Its code is SOD. It serves Sojat Road town. The station consists of 2 platforms. Passenger, Express, and Superfast trains halt here.
