= State Highway 39 (Rajasthan) =

Road in Rajasthan, India

State Highway 39

Route information
- Maintained by NHAI
- Length: 318 km (198 mi)

Location
- Country: India
- State: Rajasthan

Highway system
- Roads in India; Expressways; National; State; Asian; State Highways in Rajasthan

State Highway 39 is a state highway in Rajasthan state of India that connects Satur in Bundi district of Rajasthan with Mundwa in Nagaur district of Rajasthan. The total length of RJ SH 39 is 318 km. Length: 318 km Total length 318 km Satur Shahpura, Gulabpura, Bijaynagar, Mandi Choraya shivpuraghata rawalabadiya beawar 50 km from Ajmer Ghatii (6 km from beawar) Choti roopnagar(7 km from beawar) Roopnagar(9 km from Beawar) Babra, 21 km from Beawar Raas, 29 km from Beawar Lambiya 46 km from Beawar Merta [82 km from Beawar Mundwa 110 km from Beawar

== See also ==
- List of state highways in Rajasthan
- Roads in Pali district
