= State Highway 64 (Rajasthan) =

Road in Rajasthan, India

State Highway 64

Route information
- Length: 84 km (52 mi)

Major junctions
- North end: Rohat, Pali District, Rajasthan
- South end: Ahore, Jalore district, Rajasthan

Location
- Country: India
- State: Rajasthan
- Districts: Rajasthan: Pali district and Jalore district
- Primary destinations: Jaitpur, Vayad Garwara, Bassi, Kulthana, Bhadrajun, Nimbla, Kamba

Highway system
- Roads in India; Expressways; National; State; Asian; State Highways in Rajasthan

State Highway 64 ( RJ SH 64) is a state highway in Rajasthan state of India that connects Rohat in Pali district of Rajasthan with Ahore in Jalore district of Rajasthan. The total length of RJ SH 64 is 82 km.

This highway connects NH 65 in Rohat to RJ SH 16 in Ahore. Other cities and towns on this highway are: Garwara, Vasi and Bhadrajun.

== See also ==
- List of state highways in Rajasthan
- Roads in Pali district
