= Gaguda, Rajasthan =

Gaguda
- Village
- Interactive map of Gaguda
- Coordinates: 26°37′22.77″N 73°4′21.64″E
- Country: India
- State: Rajasthan
- Division: Jodhpur
- District: Pali
- Elevation: 295 m (968 ft)
- Time zone: UTC+05:30 (IST)
- Pincode: 306104 (Gagura)
- Telephone Code / Std Code: 02960
- ISO 3166 code: RJ-IN

Gaguda is a village located in the Sojat Mandal, Pali District, in the Indian state of Rajasthan. Gaguda is 14.2 kilometres (8.8 mi) from its Mandal Main Town Sojat.
