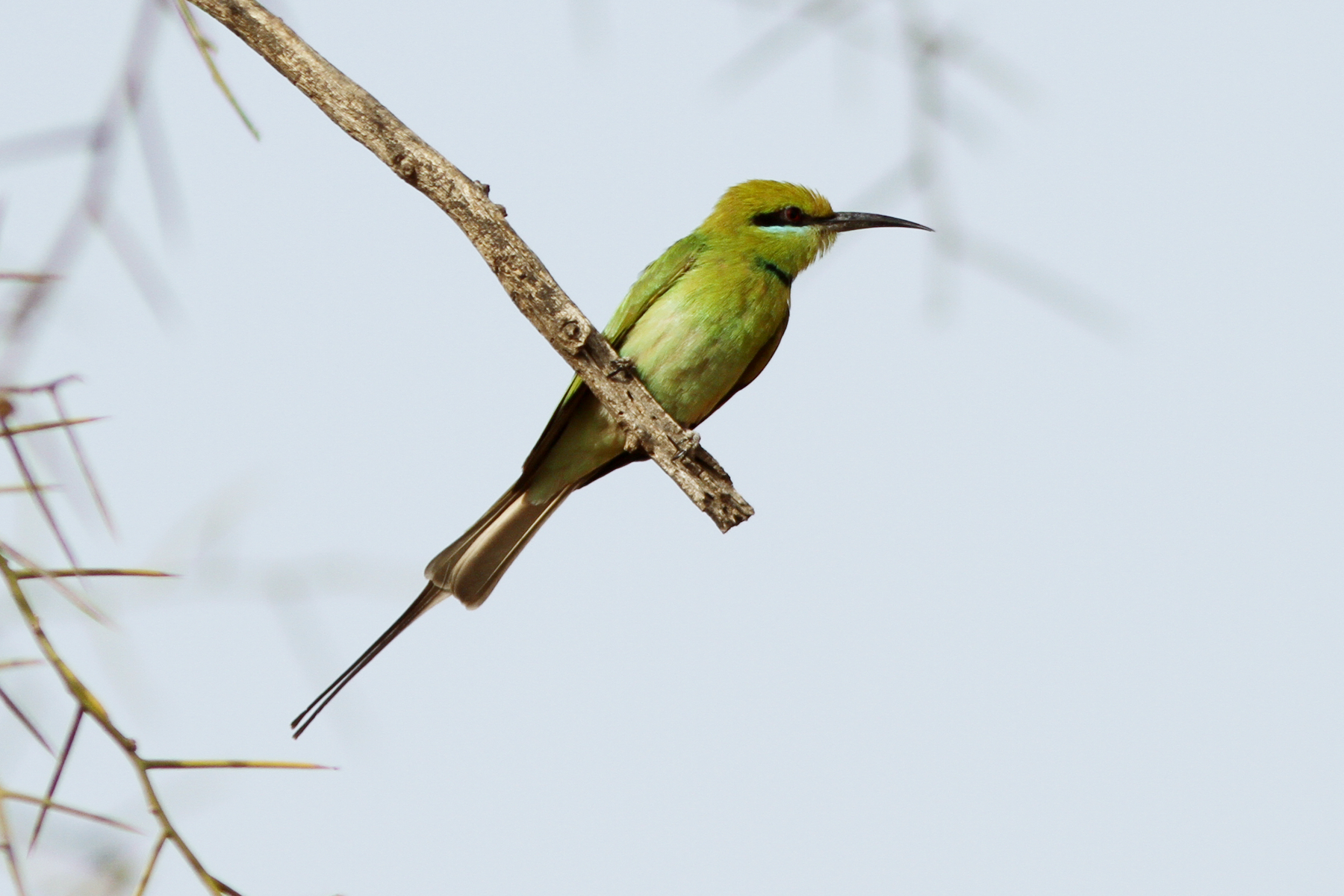
- Nominate M. v. viridissimus in Senegal

Conservation status
- Least Concern (IUCN 3.1)

Scientific classification
- Kingdom: Animalia
- Phylum: Chordata
- Class: Aves
- Order: Coraciiformes
- Family: Meropidae
- Genus: Merops
- Species: M. viridissimus

Binomial name
- Merops viridissimus Swainson, 1837

= African green bee-eater =

Species of bird

The African green bee-eater (Merops viridissimus) is a species of bird in the family Meropidae. It is found throughout arid Sahel region of Africa from Senegal east to Ethiopia, and has expanded its range north to Egypt over the past few decades.

== Taxonomy ==
Although initially described as distinct species, the African and Arabian (M. cyanophrys) green bee-eaters were lumped with the Asian green bee-eater (M. orientalis) as the green bee-eater by Sibley and Monroe in 1990. However, in 2014, the IUCN Red List and BirdLife International again split them as distinct species. A 2020 study found significant differences in morphology and voice between all three species, so they were also split from one another by the International Ornithologists' Union in 2021.

=== Subspecies ===
Three subspecies are currently accepted:

- M. v. viridissimus: most of Africa from Senegal east to Ethiopia
- M. v. flavoviridis: Chad to eastern Sudan
- M. v. cleopatra: northern Sudan and Nile Valley of Egypt

A 2004 phylogenetic analysis based on plumage recovered the M. viridissimus as sister to M. orientalis, with the clade containing both being sister to M. cyanophrys. However, the IOC classifies it as sister to M. cyanophrys.

== Distribution ==
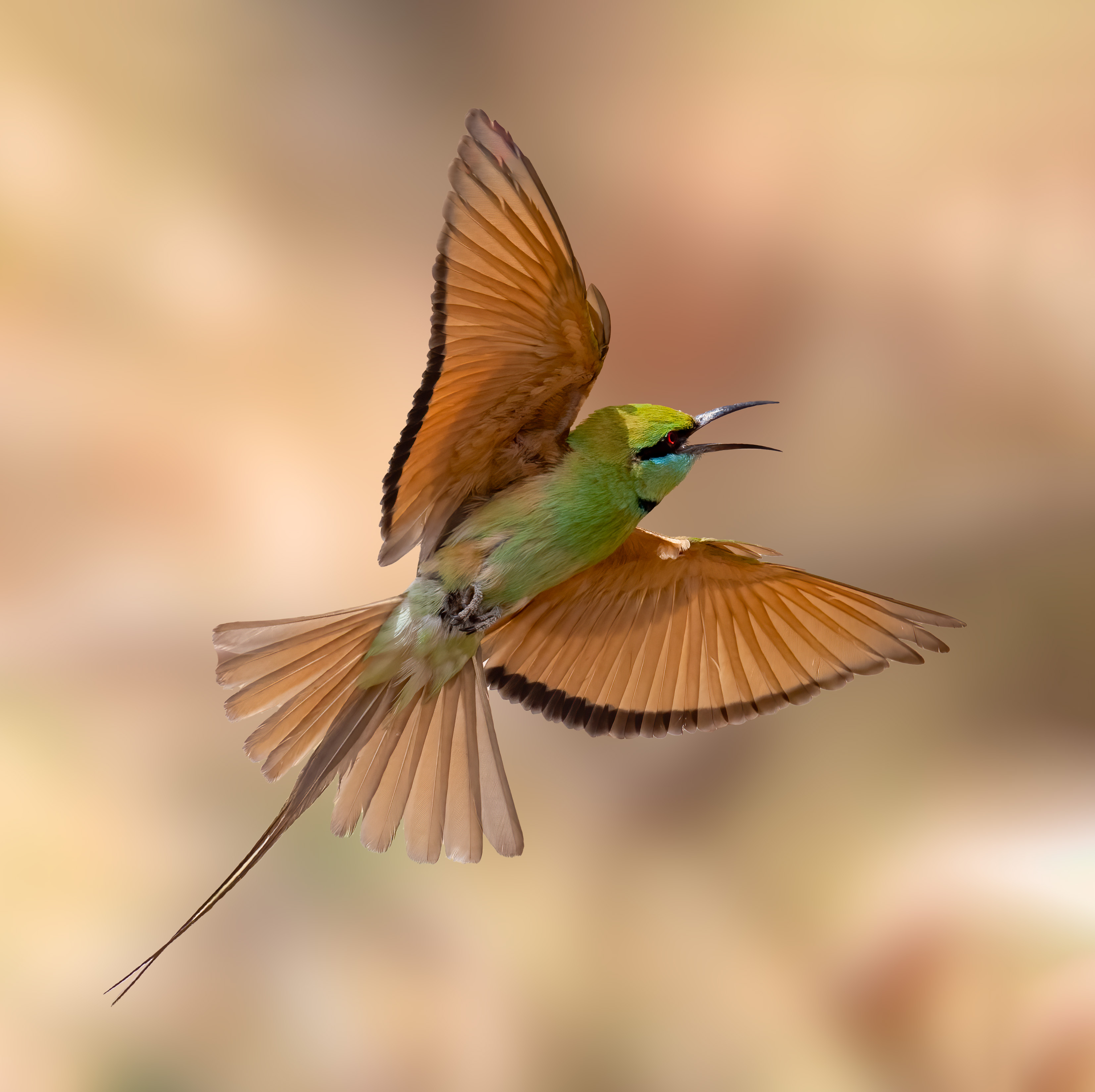
M. v. cleopatra in flight, in Egypt

It is found throughout semiarid regions of Africa, its distribution roughly coinciding with the Sahel. It ranges from coast to coast, reaching its western extent in Senegal and eastern extent in Ethiopia. The species has taken advantage of changes to agriculture and increased irrigation in this region, and has thus increased in abundance, expanding its range along the Nile. It colonised Egypt prior to 2001 and now ranges as far north as the Nile Delta. Due to this increasing population and it benefiting from human habitat modification, it is not thought to be under threat.

== Description ==
M. v. cleopatra, in Egypt

It is 16–18 centimetres (6.3–7.1 in) long excluding the elongated central tail feathers, which are an additional 8–10 cm (3.1–3.9 in) long. The head and body plumage is dull yellowish-green except for a slender black eyestripe with a very narrow blue line on the lower edge, and a black crescent at the top of the breast below the throat. The most distinctive traits of this species are that its throat is also yellowish-green, in contrast to the blue throats of M. orientalis and M. cyanophrys, and the central tail feathers are much longer. The wing and tail feathers are bronzed coppery-green above, and coppery-orange below. The iris is red, the bill is black, and the legs are dark grey. The juveniles are paler and duller overall, lack the elongated tail feathers and black throat crescent. The species also differs from M. orientalis and M. cyanophrys in its voice.
