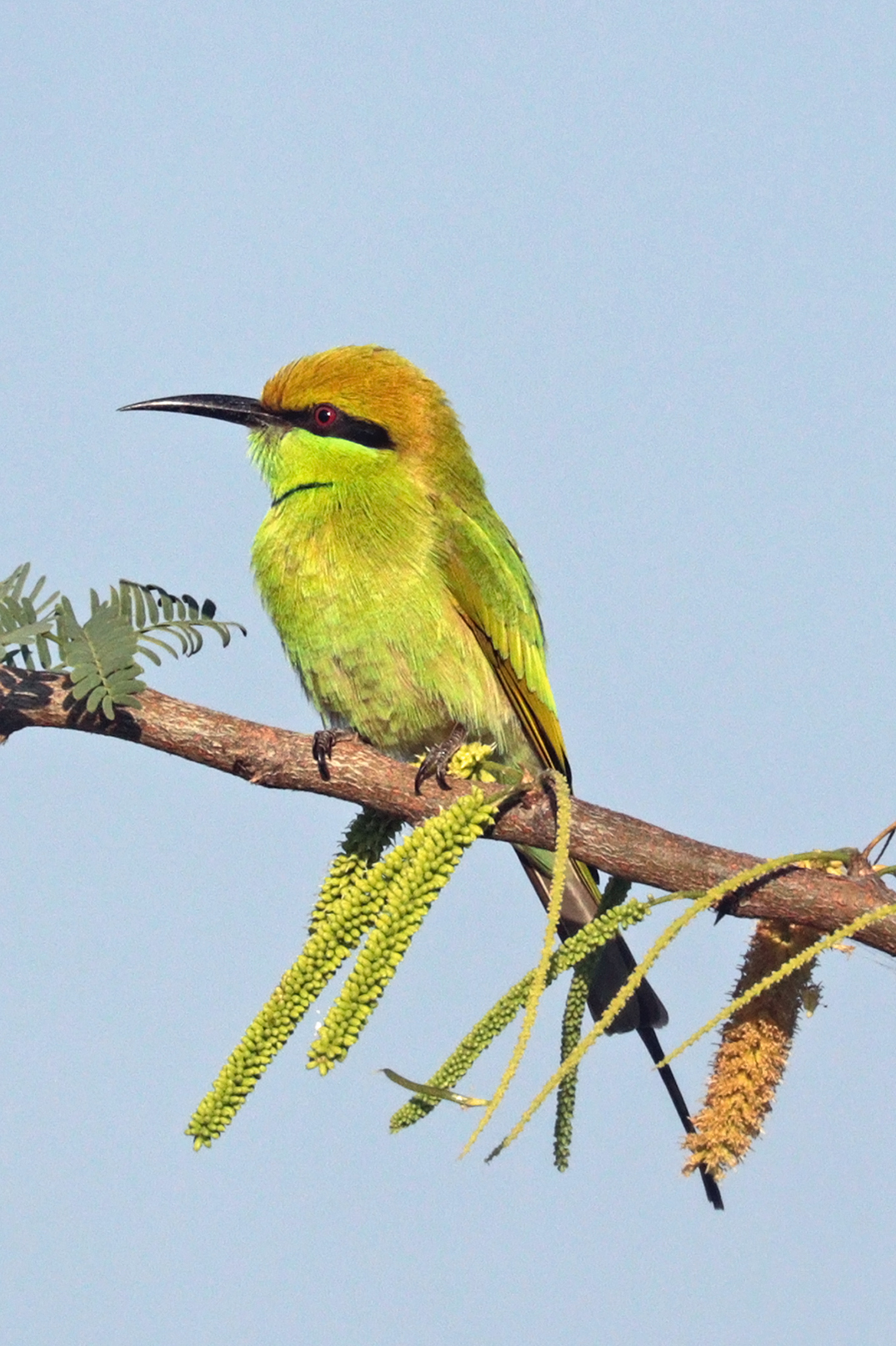
- M. o. orientalis, Jojawar, Rajasthan, India

Conservation status
- Least Concern (IUCN 3.1)

Scientific classification
- Kingdom: Animalia
- Phylum: Chordata
- Class: Aves
- Order: Coraciiformes
- Family: Meropidae
- Genus: Merops
- Species: M. orientalis

Binomial name
- Merops orientalis Latham, 1801

Synonyms
- Merops viridis Neumann, 1910

= Asian green bee-eater =

Species of bird

The Asian green bee-eater (Merops orientalis), also known as the little green bee-eater, and just green bee-eater, is a bird species in the bee-eater family. It is resident or with short-distance seasonal movements, and is found widely distributed across Asia from coastal southern Iran east through the Indian subcontinent to Vietnam. Populations in Africa and the Arabian Peninsula that were formerly assigned to this species (under the name green bee-eater) are now considered to be distinct species, the African green bee-eater and the Arabian green bee-eater. They are mainly insect eaters and they are found in grassland, thin scrub and forest often quite far from water. Several regional plumage variations are known and several subspecies have been named.

== Taxonomy and systematics ==
The Asian green bee-eater was first described by the English ornithologist John Latham in 1801 using its current binomial name. Four subspecies are currently accepted:

Image	Name	Distribution	Notes
Samianwala, Balloki, Kasur, Punjab, Pakistan	M. o. beludschicus Neumann, 1910	Iran to Pakistan and far western India (western Rajasthan)	Paler colours, and with a bluer throat. Name sometimes incorrectly cited as "biludschicus"
Baruipur, West Bengal, India	M. o. orientalis Latham, 1802	India, Nepal, Bhutan, and Bangladesh	Head and neck tinged with rufous.
Yala National Park, Sri Lanka	M. o. ceylonicus Whistler, 1944	Sri Lanka	Nape and hindneck with more pronounced golden brown sheen. Formerly often included in M. o. orientalis.
Laem Phak Bia, Phetchaburi, Thailand	M. o. ferrugeiceps Anderson, 1879	Northeastern India (Assam, Arunachal Pradesh), Myanmar, southwestern China (southern Yunnan), Thailand, Laos, Cambodia, and Vietnam	Strongly rufous crown and nape. Syn. M. o. birmanus.

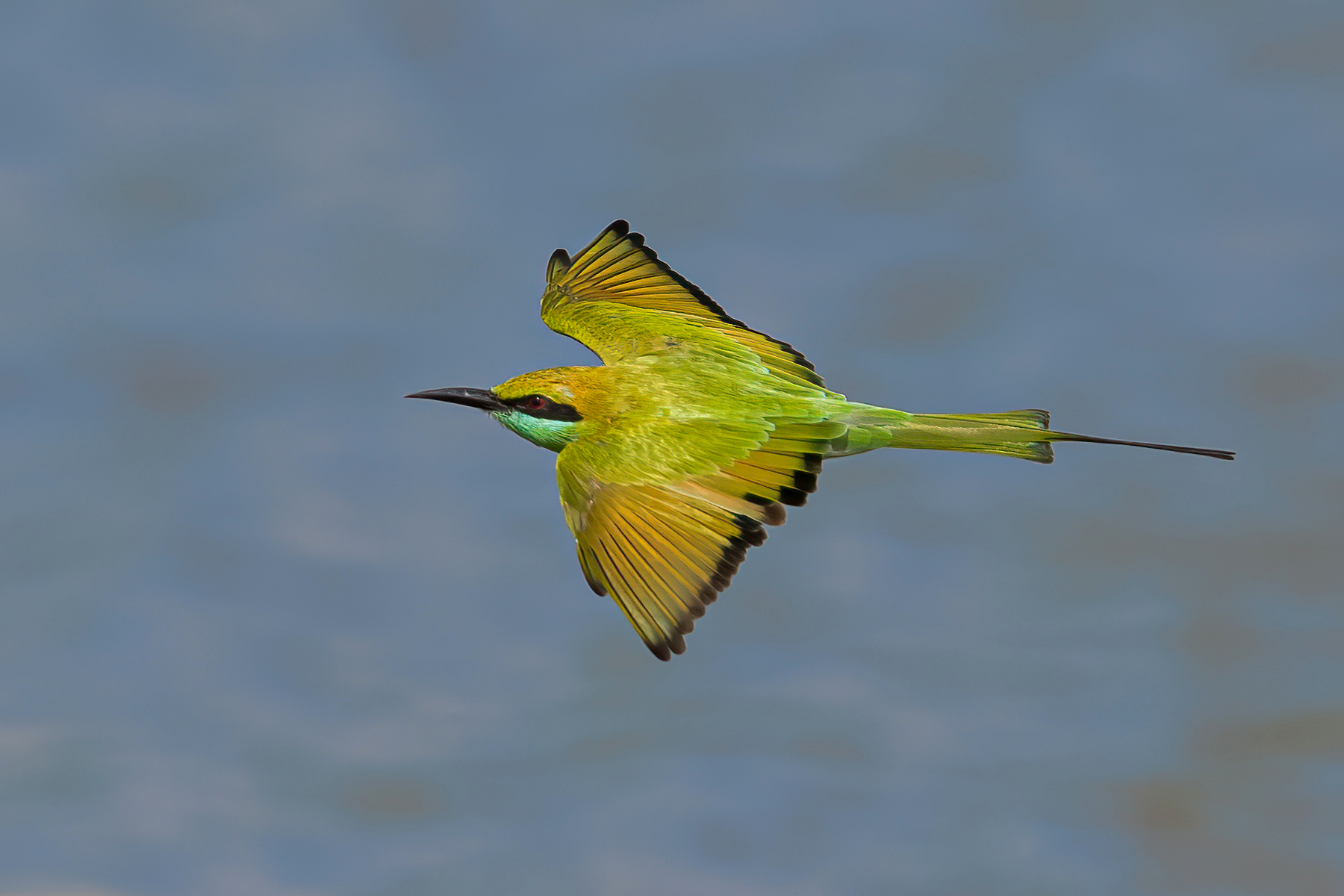
M. o. orientalis in flight showing the bronzed colour of the upperwings; near Hyderabad

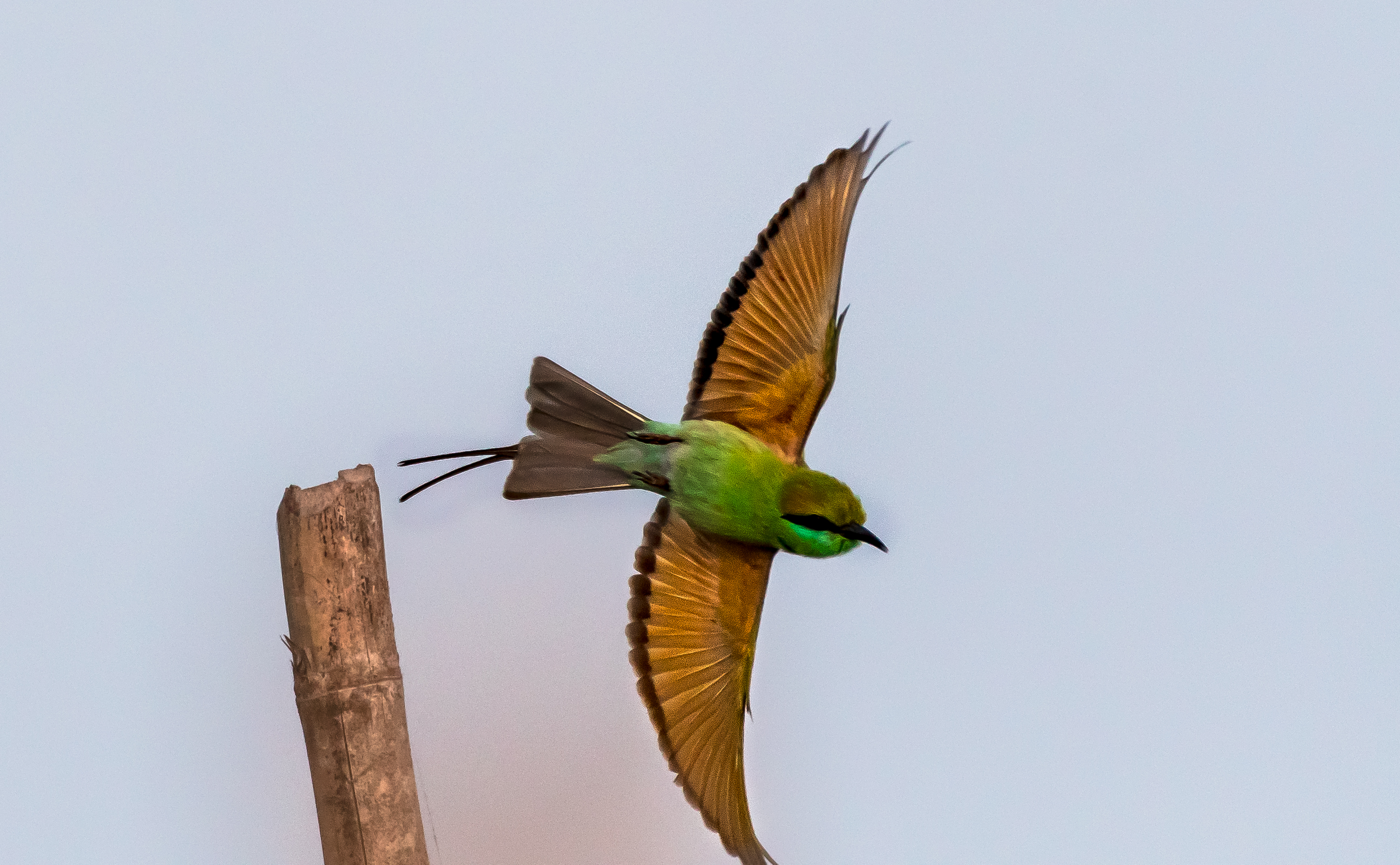
M. o. orientalis in flight showing the orange-bronze colour of the underwings; Bangladesh

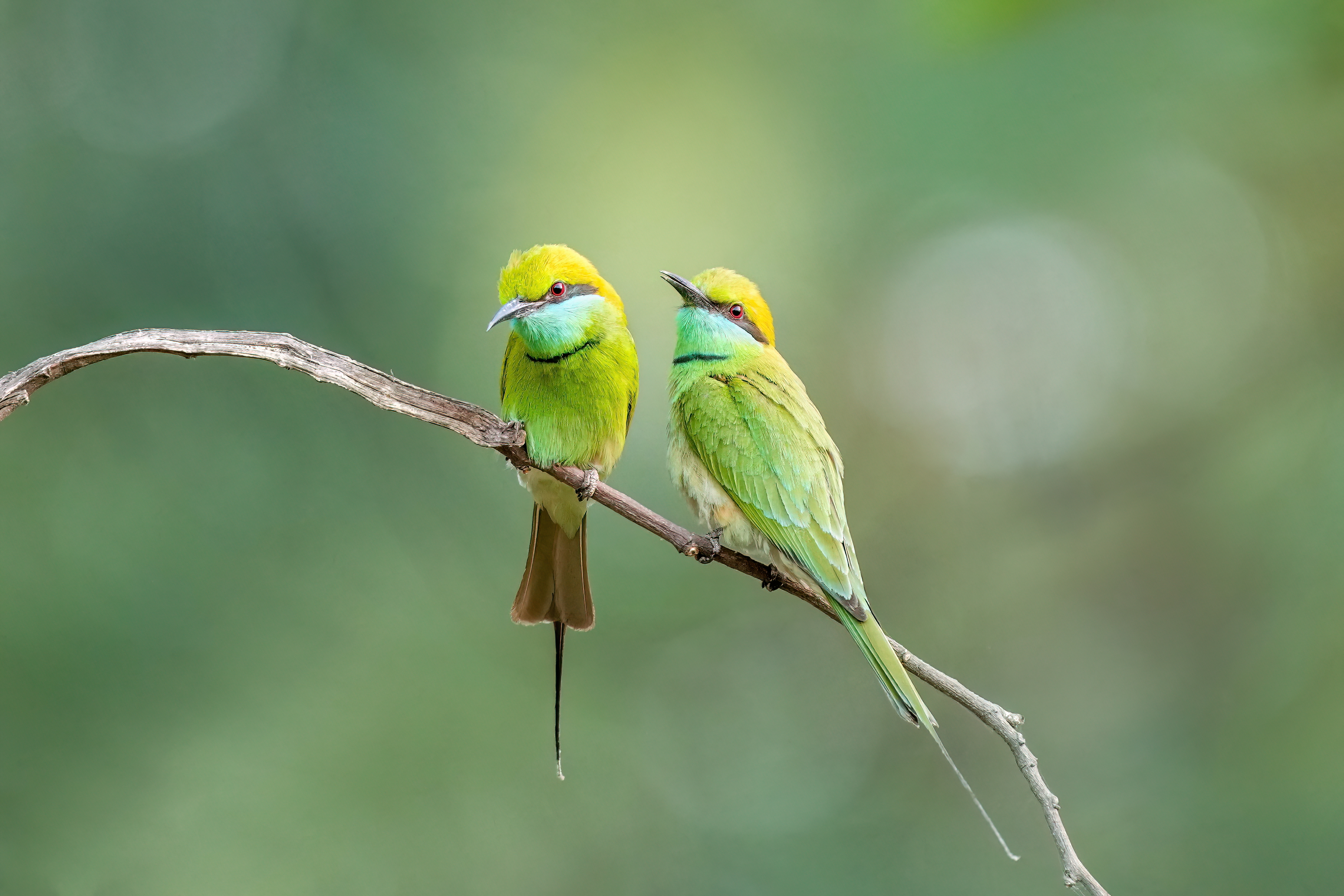
Asian green bee-eaters in Keoladeo National Park, India

The African green bee-eater (M. viridissimus, with three subspecies M. v. viridissimus, M. v. cleopatra, and M. v. flavoviridis) and Arabian green bee-eater (M. cyanophrys, with two subspecies M. c. cyanophrys and M. c. muscatensis) were formerly considered conspecific, but were split as distinct species by the IOC in 2021.

== Description ==
Like other bee-eaters, this species is a slender, richly coloured bird. It is 16–18 centimetres (6.3–7.1 in) long excluding the elongated central tail-feathers, which are an additional 7 cm (2.8 in) long. The entire plumage is bright green, tinged with blue especially on the chin and throat, while the crown and upper back are tinged with golden rufous. The flight feathers are rufous washed with green and tipped with blackish. A fine black eyestripe line runs in front of and behind the eye, and there is also a slender black crescent at the top of the breast below the throat. The iris is crimson and the bill is black, and the legs are dark grey. The feet are weak, with the three toes joined at the base. Southeast Asian birds have a rufous crown and face, and green underparts, whereas the western subspecies M. o. beludschicus has a greener crown, bluer face, and bluish underparts. In flight, the wings are bronzed coppery-green above, and coppery-orange below. The juveniles are paler and duller overall, lack the elongated tail feathers and black throat crescent, and have a yellow-tinged (not blue-toned) throat. The sexes are alike.

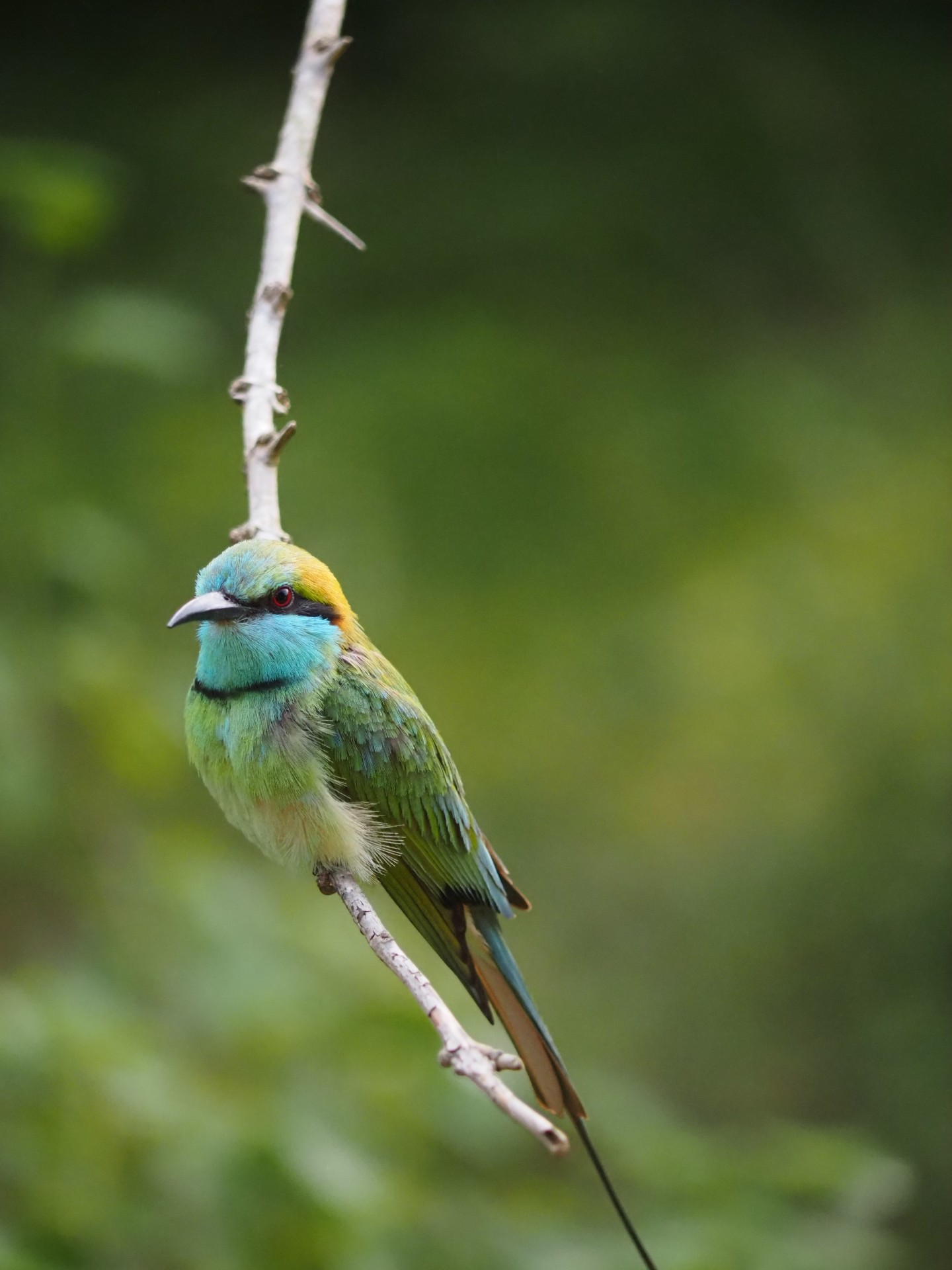
Merops orientalis in beautiful colour sat on a branch; Sri Lanka

The calls is a nasal trill tree-tree-tree-tree, usually given in flight.

Leucistic individuals have been noted.

== Distribution and habitat ==
This is an abundant and fairly tame bird, familiar throughout its range. It is a bird which breeds in open country with bushes. This species often hunts from low perches, maybe only a metre or less high. It readily makes use of fence wires and electric wires. Unlike some other bee-eaters, they can be found well away from water.

They are mostly seen in the plains but can sometimes be found up to 2,000 m (6,600 ft) in the Himalayas. They are resident in the lowlands of South Asia but some populations move seasonally but the patterns are not clear, moving away to drier regions in the rainy season and to warmer regions in winter. In parts of Pakistan, they are summer visitors.

== Behaviour and ecology ==
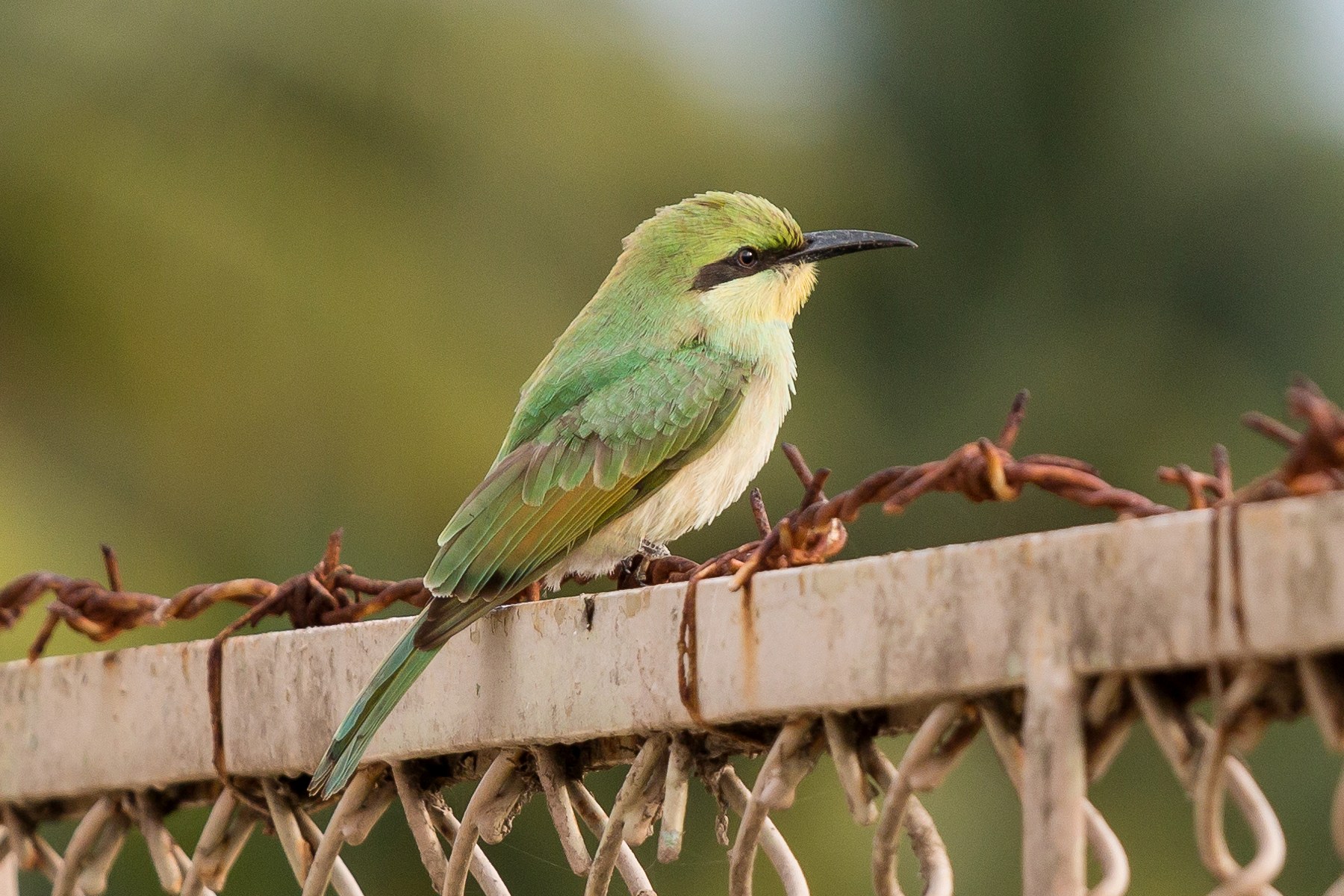
Juvenile M. o. orientalis, Western Ghats, Karnataka

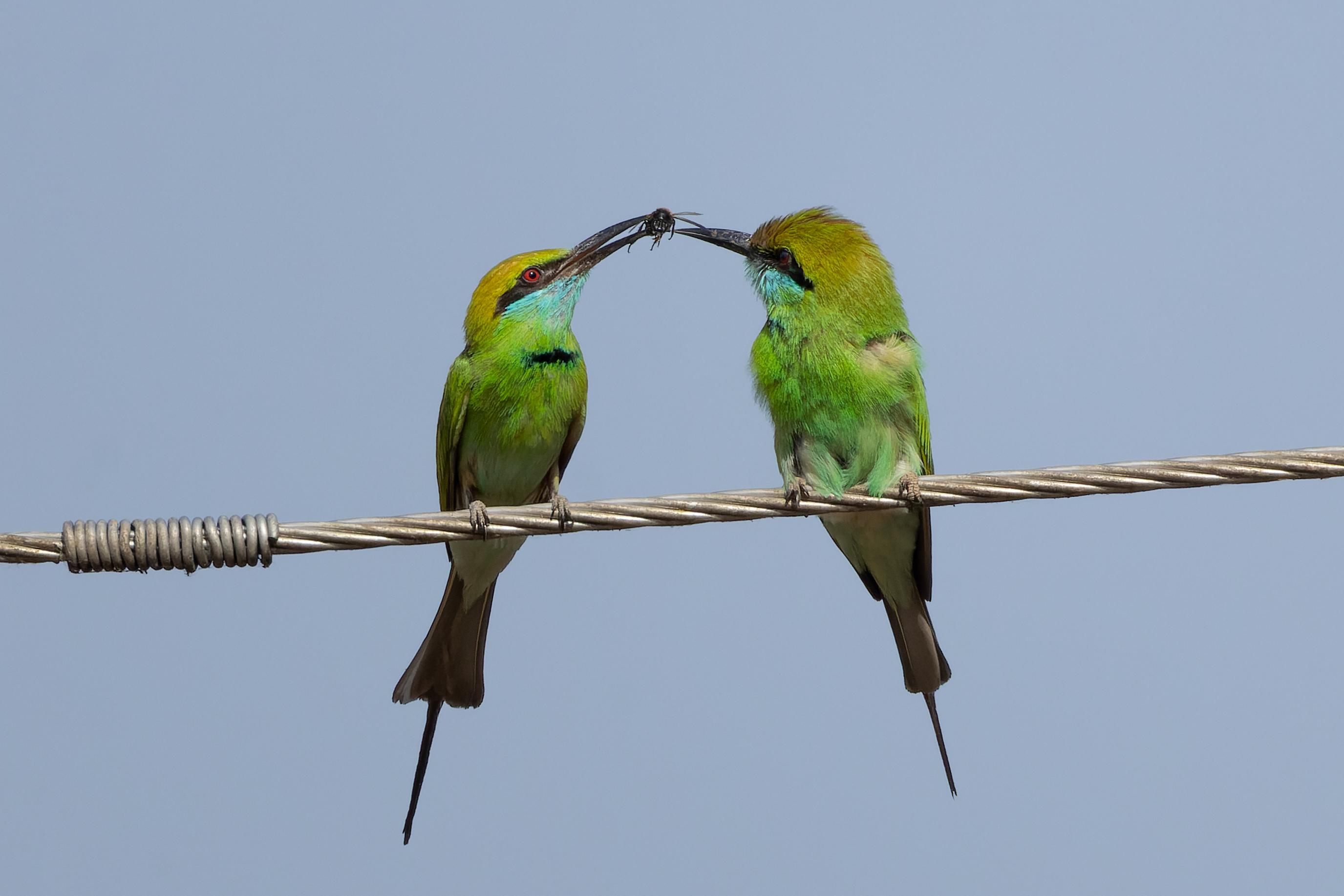
Merops orientalis offering food in Jawai Dam, Rajasthan, India.

M. o. ceylonicus in Okanda, Sri Lanka

Like other species in the genus, bee-eaters predominantly eat insects, especially bees, wasps and ants, which are caught in the air by sorties from an open perch. Before swallowing prey, a bee-eater removes stings and breaks the exoskeleton of the prey by repeatedly thrashing it on the perch. Migration is not known but they make seasonal movements in response to rainfall. These birds are somewhat sluggish in the mornings and may be found huddled next to each other on wires sometimes with their bills tucked in their backs well after sunrise. They sand-bathe more frequently than other bee-eater species and will sometimes bathe in water by dipping into water in flight. They are usually seen in small groups and often roost communally in large numbers (200–300). The birds move excitedly at the roost site and call loudly, often explosively dispersing before settling back to the roost tree. The little green bee-eater is also becoming common in urban and sub-urban neighborhoods, and has been observed perching on television antennae, only to launch into a brief, zig-zag flight formation to catch an insect, then return to the same perch and consume the meal. This behaviour is generally observed between the hours of 7:00 and 8:00am, and after 4:00pm.

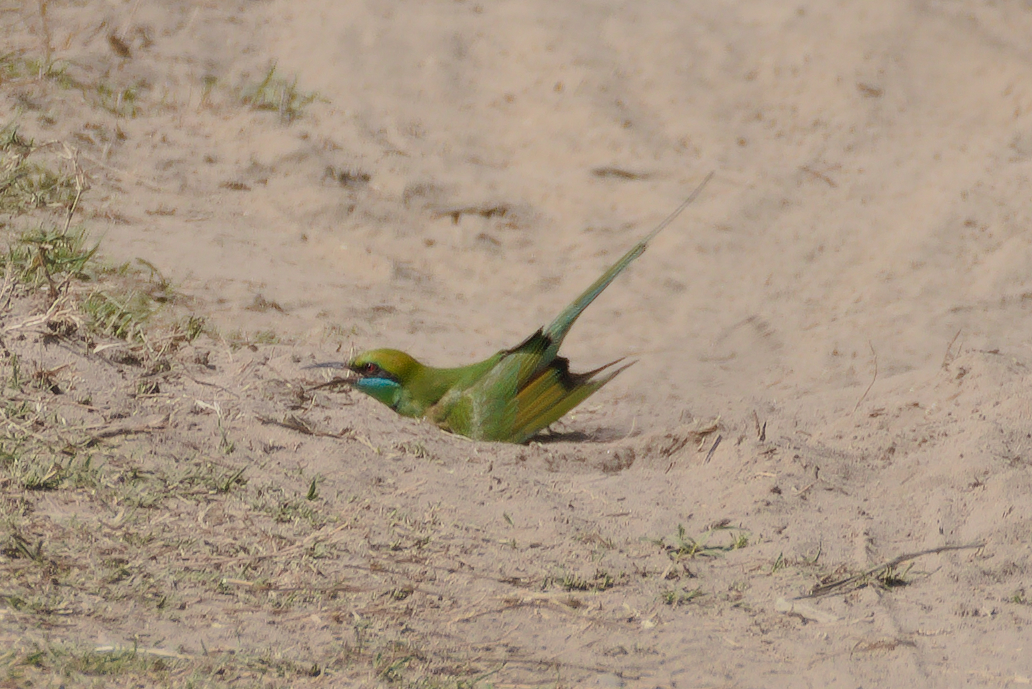
Asian green bee-eater dust bathing near Roorkee, Uttarakhand

The breeding season is from March to June. Unlike many bee-eaters, they are often solitary nesters, making a tunnel in a sandy bank. The breeding pairs are often joined by helpers. They nest in hollows in vertical mud banks. The nest tunnel that they construct can run as much as 1.5 metres (5 ft) long and the 3–5 eggs are laid on the bare ground in the cavity at the end of the tunnel. The eggs are very spherical and glossy white. Clutch size varies with rainfall and insect food density. Both sexes incubate. The eggs hatch asynchronously with an incubation period of about 14 days and the chicks grow fledge in 3 to 4 weeks and in the fledging stage show a reduction in body weight. A study suggested that green bee-eaters may be capable of interpreting the behaviour of human observers. They showed an ability to predict whether a human at a particular location would be capable of spotting the nest entrance and then behaved appropriately to avoid giving away the nest location. The ability to look at a situation from another's point of view was previously believed to be possessed only by primates.

Riverside habitats were found to support high populations in southern India (157/km^{2} (410/sq mi)) dropping off to 101/km^{2} (260/sq mi) in agricultural areas and 43–58/km^{2} (110–150/sq mi) near human habitations.

They feed on flying insects and can sometimes be nuisance to bee-keepers. The preferred prey was mostly beetles followed by hymenopterans. Orthopterans appear to be avoided. They are sometimes known to take crabs. Like most other birds they regurgitate the hard parts of their prey as pellets.

An endoparasitic nematode (Torquatoides balanocephala) sometimes infects their gizzard. A protozoal parasite in their blood, Haemoproteus manwelli, has been described from India.

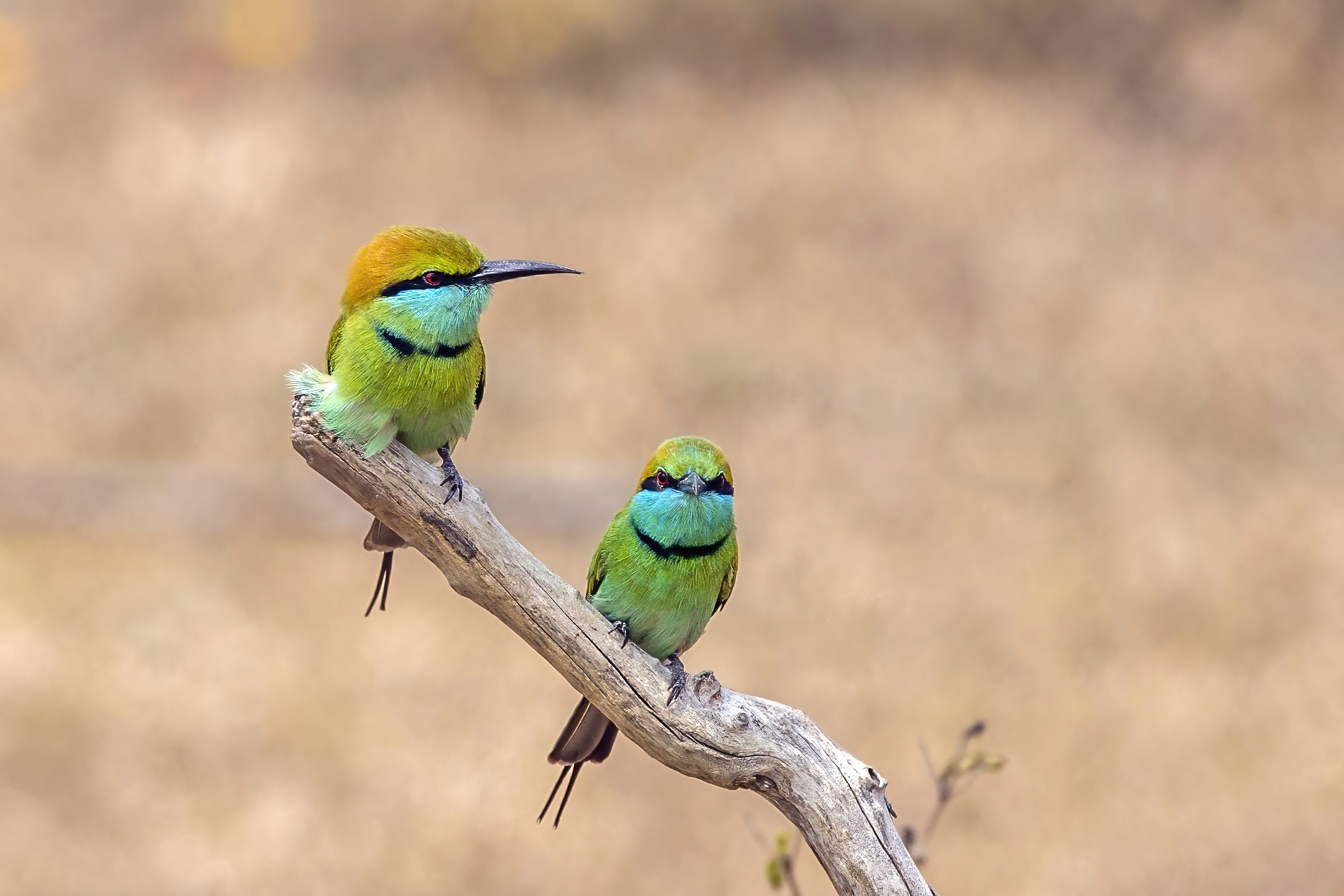
M. o. ceylonicus pair

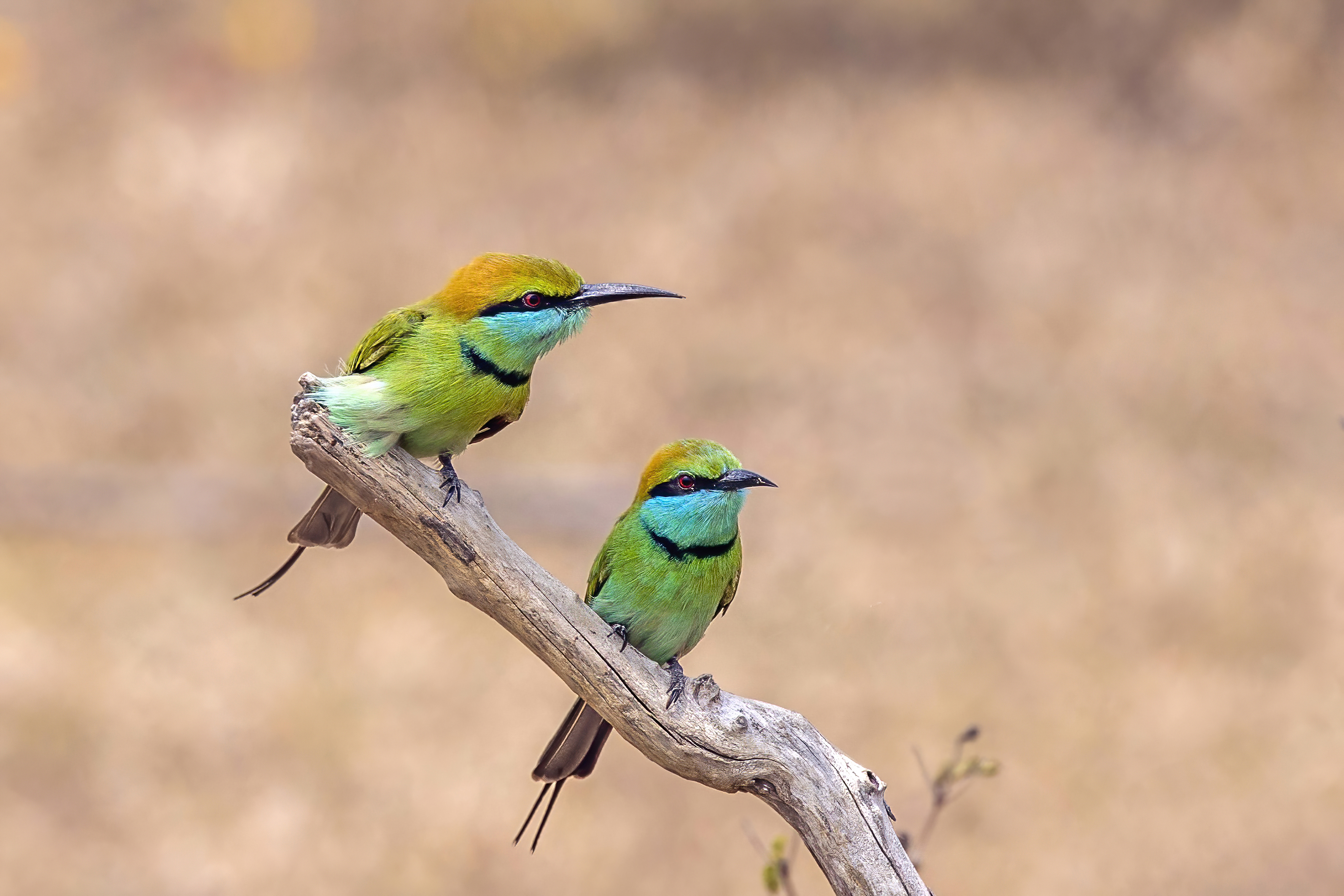
spotting prey

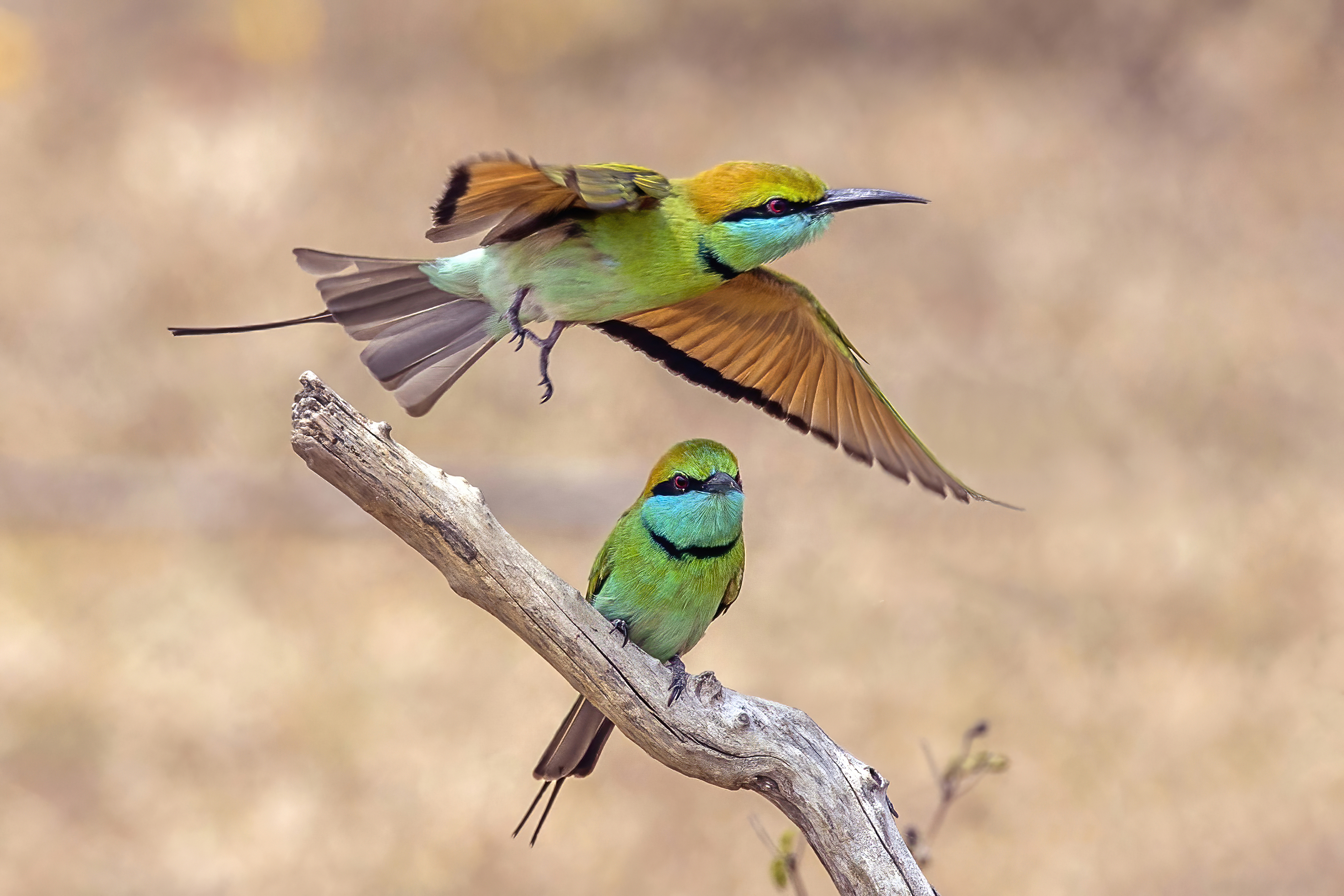
flying off to catch prey

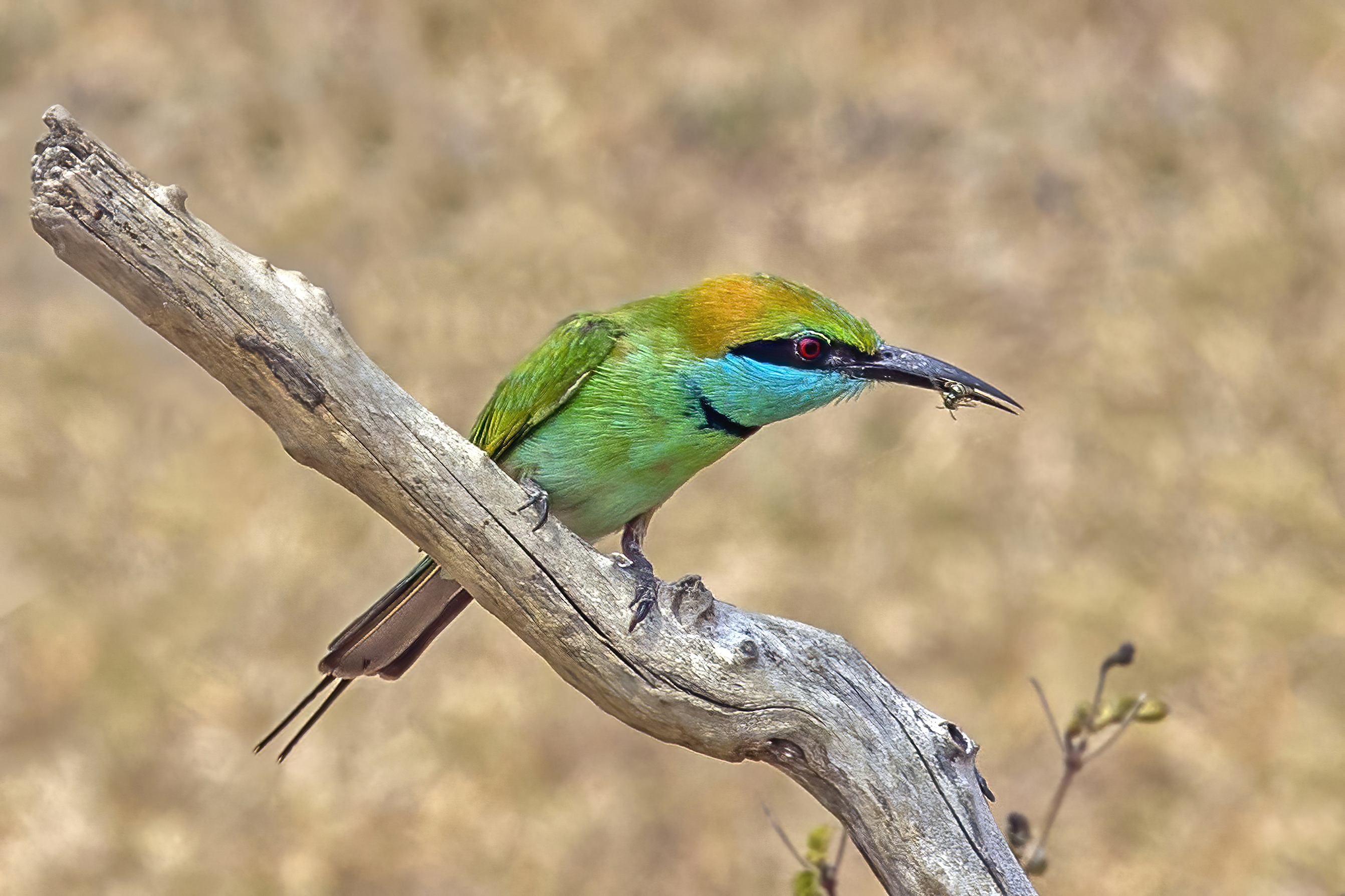
with a bee
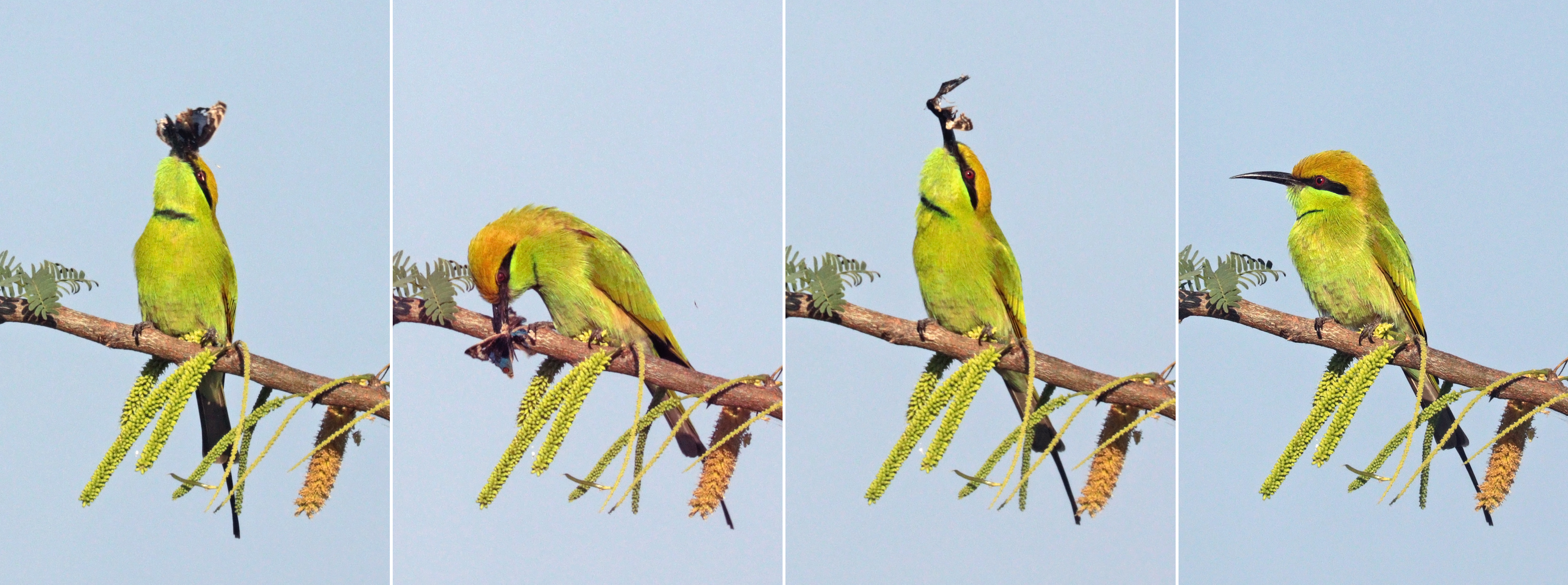
M. o. orientalis eating a blue pansy butterfly
