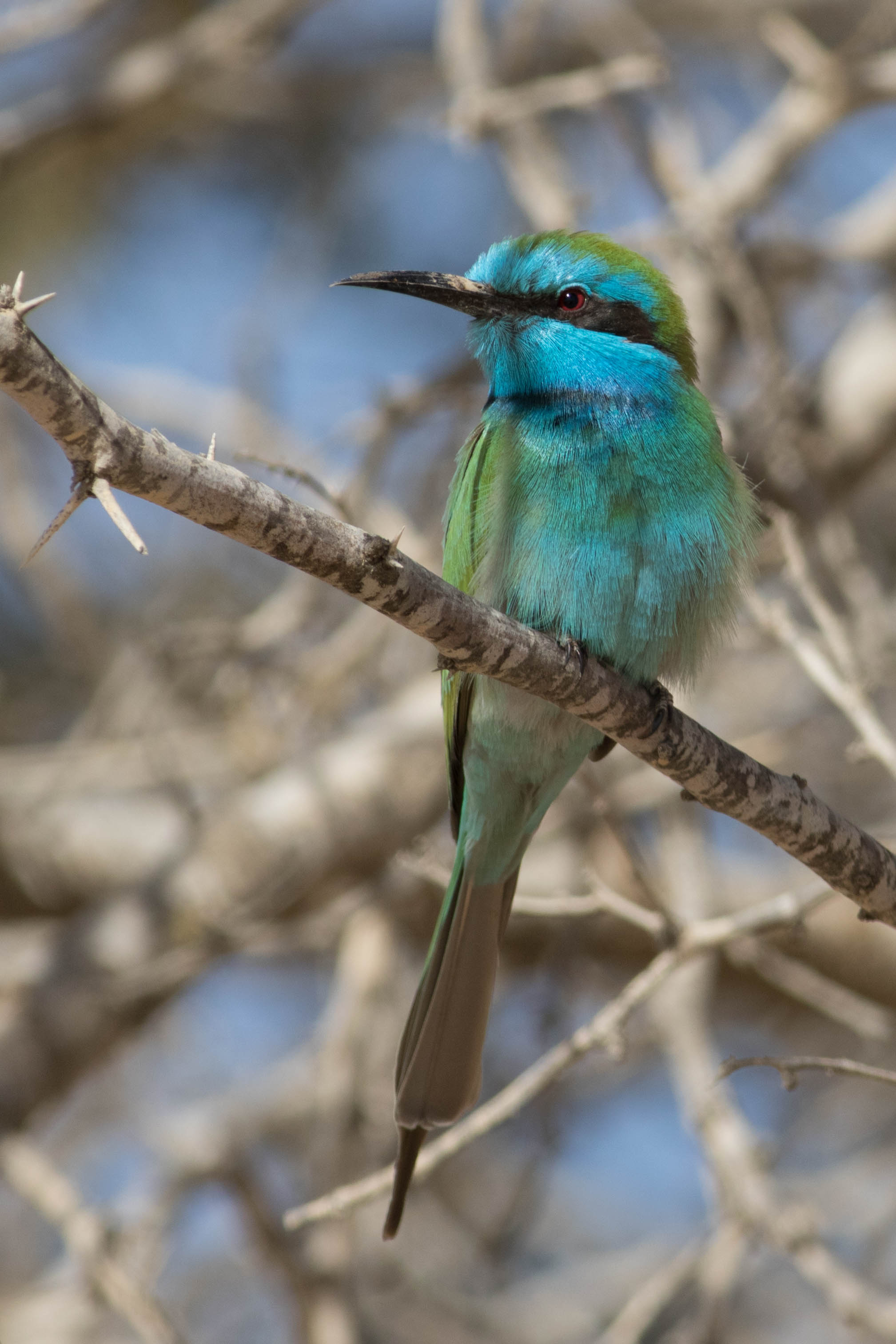
- M. c. cyanophrys, Israel

Conservation status
- Least Concern (IUCN 3.1)

Scientific classification
- Kingdom: Animalia
- Phylum: Chordata
- Class: Aves
- Order: Coraciiformes
- Family: Meropidae
- Genus: Merops
- Species: M. cyanophrys

Binomial name
- Merops cyanophrys (Cabanis & Heine, 1860)

= Arabian green bee-eater =

Species of bird

The Arabian green bee-eater (Merops cyanophrys) is a species of bird in the family Meropidae. It has a patchy distribution in the arid regions of the Arabian Peninsula from Saudi Arabia south to Yemen and east to Oman and the United Arab Emirates, and has expanded its range north to the southern Levant over the past few decades.

== Taxonomy ==
Although initially described as distinct species, the Arabian and African (M. viridissimus) green bee-eaters were grouped with the Asian green bee-eater (M. orientalis) as the green bee-eater by Sibley and Monroe in 1990. However, in 2014, the IUCN Red List and BirdLife International again split them as distinct species. A 2020 study found significant differences in morphology and voice between all three species, so they were also split from one another by the International Ornithologists' Union in 2021.

Two subspecies are accepted:

- M. c. cyanophrys - western and southern Arabian Peninsula from southern Israel and Jordan south through western Saudi Arabia to Yemen and the far east of Oman
- M. c. muscatensis - eastern Arabian Peninsula, locally in the centre of the peninsula, in eastern Saudi Arabia and the United Arab Emirates south to eastern Oman

== Description ==
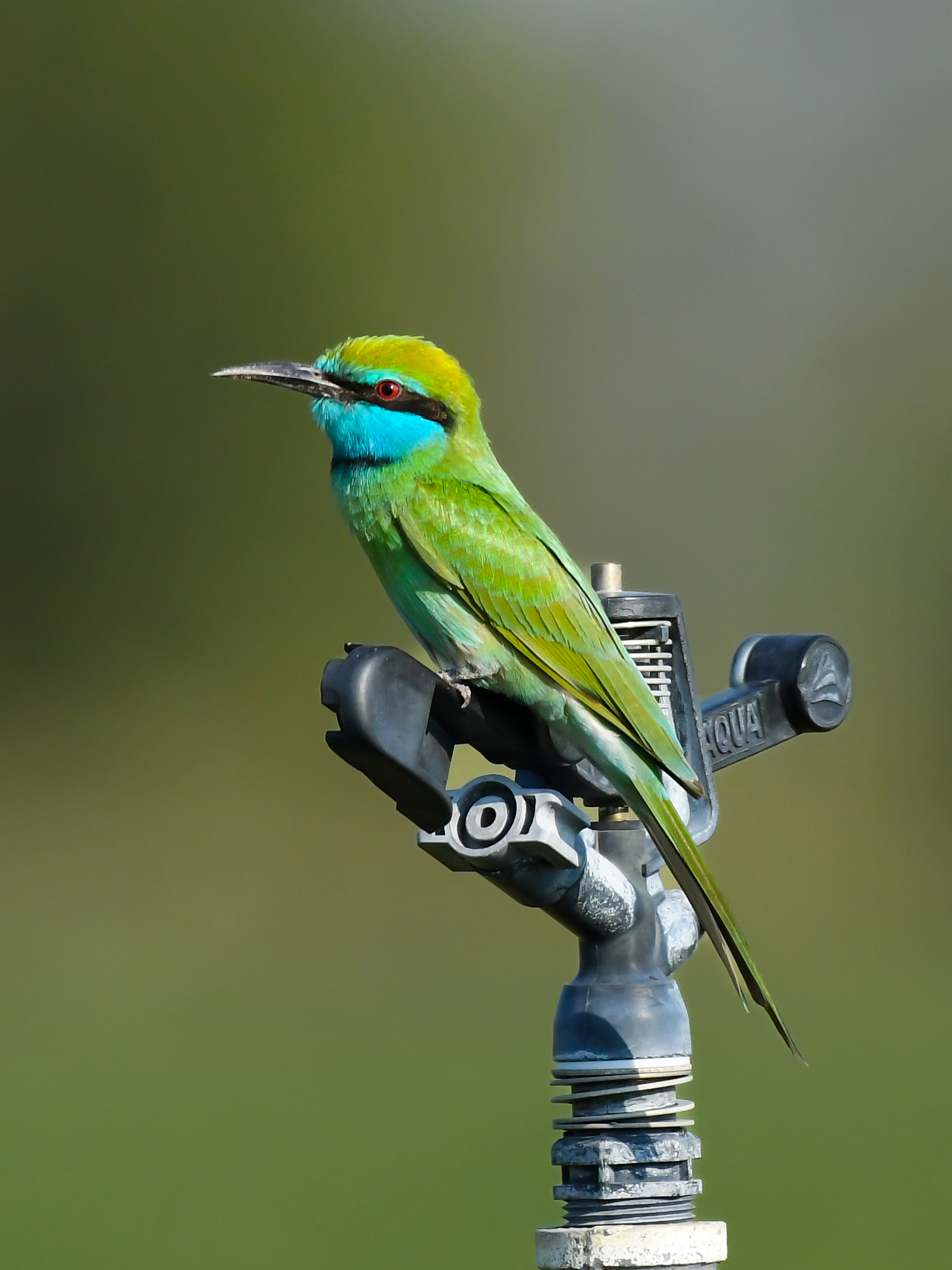
M. c. muscatensis in Barka, eastern Oman

It is 16–18 centimetres (6.3–7.1 in) long excluding the elongated central tail feathers, which are an additional 2 cm (0.8 in) long. The head and back plumage is dull green except for a slender black eyestripe with a broad blue forehead and line above the black eyestripe, a conspicuous blue throat, and a broad black crescent at the top of the breast below the throat. The breast and underparts are blue-green. The most distinctive trait of this species is its bright blue throat and face, more intense than on either M. orientalis or M. viridissimus, and the central tail feathers are shorter. The wing and tail feathers are bronzed coppery-green above, and coppery-orange below. The iris is red, the bill is black, and the legs are dark grey. The juveniles are paler and duller overall, and lack the elongated tail feathers and black throat crescent. The species also differs from M. orientalis and M. viridissimus in its voice. M. c. muscatensis differs from M. c. cyanophrys in being slightly more yellowish-green above, and having a slightly narrower black crescent at the top of the breast.

== Habitat ==
The Arabian green bee-eater is a native species of Egypt, Israel, Jordan, Oman, Palestine, Saudi Arabia, the United Arab Emirates, and Yemen. Agricultural expansion and irrigation has increased the amount of habitable areas. The International Union for Conservation of Nature considers the be of "least concern". According to wildlife photographer Arthur Grosset, it is "is usually found in dry, open country with scattered trees and in wadis, gardens and farmland".
