= Nimbahera Jatan =

Nimbahera Jatan is a village in Bhilwara district in Rajasthan, India

The village has a total population of 2,675 peoples and about 531 houses. It is located on SH-61 and well connected to Highway. Nearest railway station is Mandal (Bhilwara) and Airport is Maharana Pratap International Airport Dabok, Udaipur. This village's main occupation is agriculture.
