= Bagol =

Bagol Jangid solankiana
- Village
- Nickname: solankiana
- Location in Rajasthan, India Bagol Jangid (India)
- Coordinates: 25°22′47.99″N 73°38′46.41″E
- Country: India
- State: Rajasthan
- District: Pali
- Talukas: Desuri

Government
  - Body: Gram Panchayat
  - Sarpanch: Bhawar Singhji Solanki

Area
  - Total: 3,131 km^{2} (1,209 sq mi)
- Elevation: 364.236 m (1,195.00 ft)

Population (2001)
  - Total: 3,690
  - Density: 1.18/km^{2} (3.05/sq mi)

Languages
  - Official: Hindi Marwari
- Time zone: UTC+5:30 (IST)
- PIN: 306502
- Telephone code: 02934
- ISO 3166 code: RJ-IN
- Vehicle registration: RJ22
- Nearest city: Sadri
- Lok Sabha constituency: Pali
- Vidhan Sabha constituency: Marwar Junction
- Civic agency: Gram Panchayat
- Climate: summer (Köppen)

Bagol is a village in the Desuri tehsil in the Pali district of Rajasthan, India. It was established by Keshu Das and Bheek Singh. It is near Sadri on state highway SH 62 between Ganthi and Magartalav-Kolar, in a valley on the western side of the Aravalli Range. Bagol is accessible by road from Jojawar and Khinwara to Desuri.

Falna, Rani, Somesar, Phulad and Marwar Junction are the nearest railway stations to reach Bagol. Around 1910, Bagol was the only railway station on proposed Udaipur–Fulad Railway line by Bombay, Baroda and Central India Railway (BB&CI). Due to some government planning the work of extending the railway line via Bagol was stopped. The railway building still exists in Bagol, which is now under Forest Department. Solanki Family and Kothari Family made many contributions in this village.

== Architecture ==
Shri Shankheshwar Parshvanath Temple in Bagol is one of the special Jain temple famous for its ancient and historical sculpture of Shankheshwar Parshwanath and Shri Chintamani Parshvanath Temple in Bagol is one of the special Jain temple famous for its ancient and historical sculpture of Chintamani Parshwanath. The speciality of these murthi (idol) is that if it is closely watched it may appear to be a common statue but this statue includes many such features as not contained by any other idol. The most prominent and obvious variation of the statue is that it is enhanced by stand of Shesh Nag on each of its shoulders. In general an idol includes only one snake placed overhead.

== Education ==
Bagol is an education centre of surrounding area. Bagol has about many primary schools, 1 higher secondary school Govt, Se Sr. Sec School Bagol(Arts Faculty) [ Total 2 Govt. School ]
