= Lambiya =

- rural
- Location in Rajasthan, India Lambiya (India)
- Coordinates: 26.4°N 73.0667°E
- Country: India
- State: Rajasthan
- District: Pali
- Founder: Bhadur Singh Rathore
- Elevation: 310 m (1,020 ft)

Population (2001)
  - Total: 6,823

Languages
  - Official: Hindi
- Time zone: UTC+5:30 (IST)
- PIN: 306301
- Telephone code: 02939
- ISO 3166 code: RJ-IN
- Vehicle registration: RJ-22
- Sex ratio: 966 ♂/♀

Lambiya is a village in Jaitaran tehsil of Pali district in the Indian state of Rajasthan.

== Geography ==
Lambiya is located at 26.4°N 73.0667°E. It has an average elevation of 310 metres (1020 feet).

== Demographics ==
As of 2001 India census, Lambiya had a population of 6,823. Males constitute 51% 3,471) of the population and females 49% (3,352).
