= Bhadrajun =

Panchayat Samiti in Rajasthan, India

- Erstwhile Jagir Jodhpur State, Panchayat Samiti, Sub-Tehsil
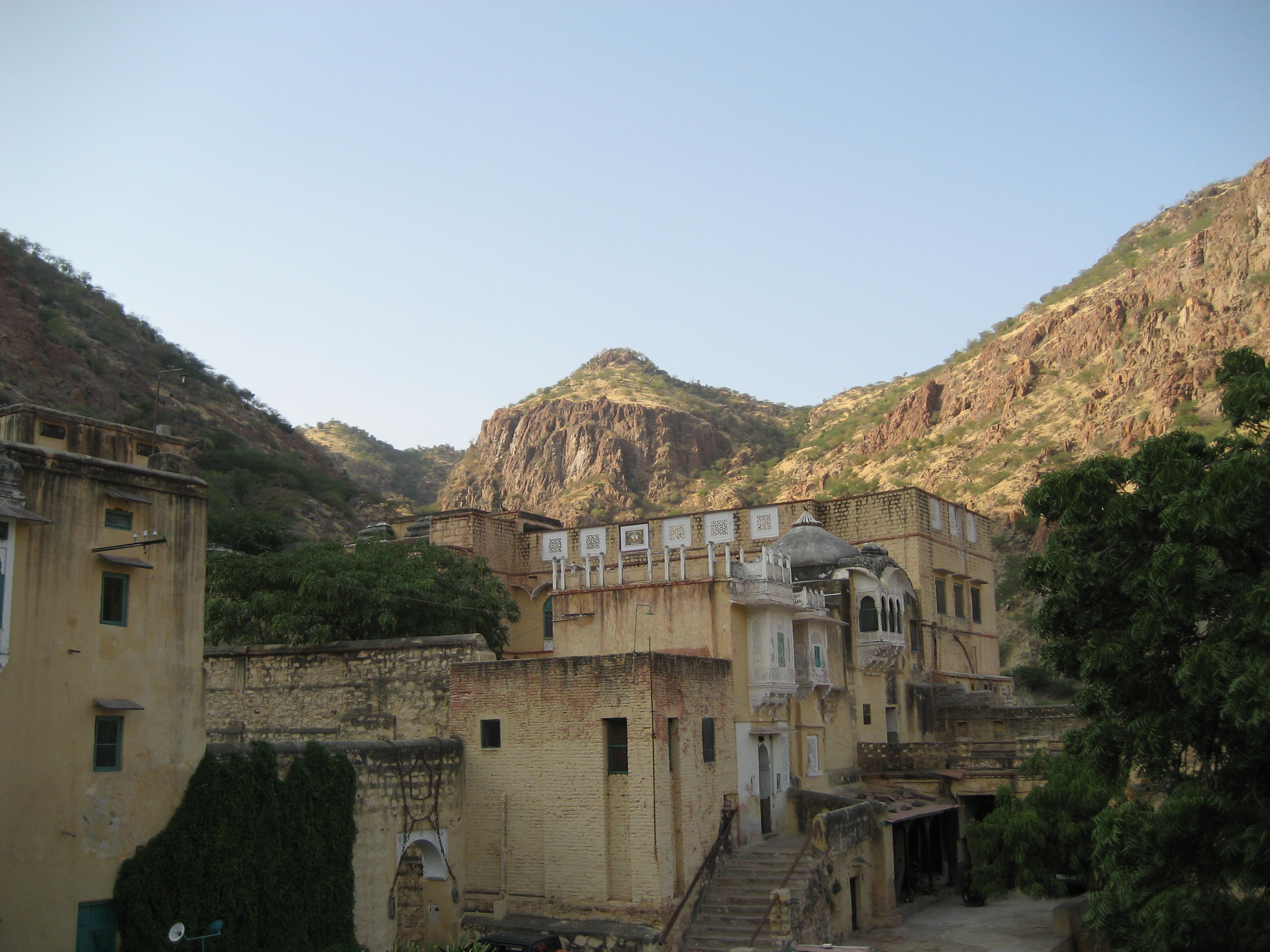

- Location in Rajasthan, India Bhadrajun (India)
- Coordinates: 25.600°N 72.867°E
- Country: India
- State: Rajasthan
- District: Jalor
- Founder: Rao Jodha of Mandore
- Named for: Subhdr-arjun
- Elevation: 225 m (738 ft)

Population (2011)
  - Total: 5,546

Languages
  - Official: Hindi
  - Regional: Marwari, Rajasthani
- Time zone: UTC+5:30 (IST)
- Postal code: 307029
- Vehicle registration: RJ-16
- Sex ratio: 908 ♂/♀
- Website: http://www.bhadrajunfort.com

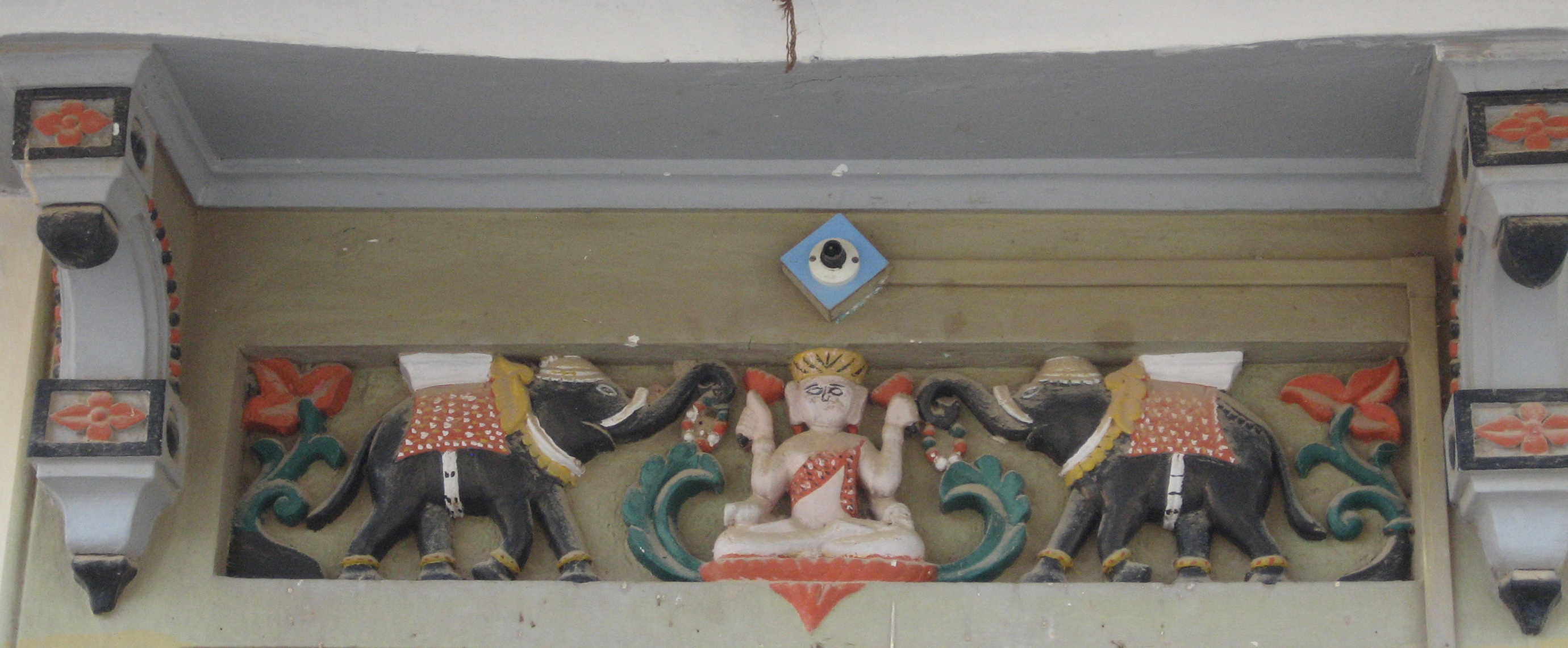
Blessing to the fort

Bhadrajun is a village and Sub-Tehsil in the Jalore district of the western part of Rajasthan, India, dating back to ancient times of the Mahabharata epic. It gets its name from Subhadra and her husband Arjuna from Dvapara Yuga. However, in recent centuries, it was the scene of warfare between the rulers of the Marwar dynasty and of the Mughal Empire.

In the 16th century, a fort known as the Bhadrajun Fort was built at Bhadrajun by the Rathore kings of Marwar. Today the fort is owned by Raja Shri Karanveer Singhji, the sixteenth descendant of Marwar Maharajas, who ruled from Jodhpur. It is now run as a heritage hotel. The fort has a significant collection of goods from its long past.

== Geography ==
Bhadarjun is located in Jalore district within the Luni River basin. It is situated in a tropical and semi-tropical climatic zone. The average annual and daily temperatures are high, with annual rainfall of 434 millimetres (17.1 in). January is the coldest month, with temperatures recorded between 1 and 2 °C (34 and 36 °F). Summer is very hot, recording an average daily temperature in the range of 41 to 42 °C (106 to 108 °F). The highest temperature recorded was 48 °C (118 °F) on a few days.

According to the 2001 census, the population of Bhadrajun was 4,499, with 2,358 males and 2,141 females.

== History ==
=== Legend ===
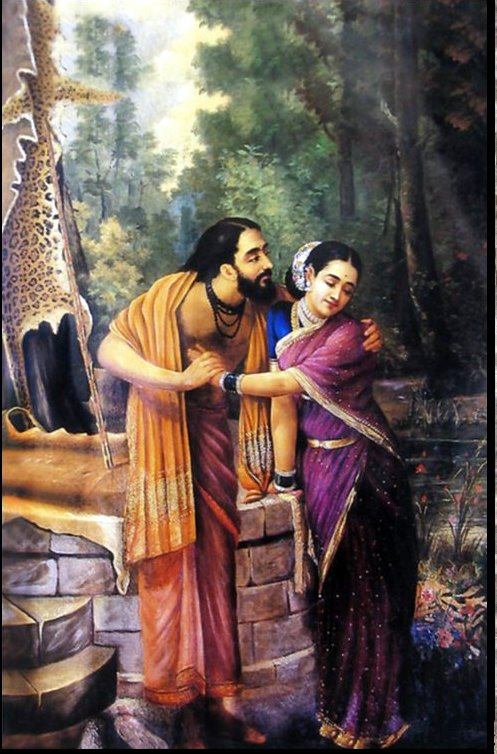
Arjuna and Subhadra were married in Bhadrajun

The word Bhadrajun is directly linked to the Mahabharata epic. Bhadrajun is made up of two words, the name of 'Subhadra', sister of Lord Krishna, plus 'Arjuna', the third among the five Pandava brothers of Mahabharata. Initially, it was called "Subhdr-arjun" but over the years it was changed to the colloquial usage of the single word "Bhadrajun". The legend linked to this name is a story of romance.

According to the Mahabharata legend, when Arjuna was in the last stage of his exile, he came to Dwarka. While roaming with Lord Krishna during a festival, he beheld Shubhada, the heavenly daughter of Vasudeva and fell for her instantly. On seeing his friend's condition Krishna advised Partha to escape with his dear sister. The reason for Krishna's advice was, if a Swayamvara was held nobody could predict whom the Yadava princess would’ve chosen. Also, none of the Yadavas would agree to this marriage if Krishna proposed it in front of them, as Arjuna was already married thrice and they wouldn't want their beloved princess to be someone's fourth wife. However, Arjuna, who was disguised as a saint, was desperate to have the daughter of Vasudeva (maternal uncle of Arjuna), Subhadra as his wife. Before eloping with Chitra (Subhadra), Partha took permission from both Yudhishthira and Lord Krishna, who wished nothing but the best for his little sister.

Arjuna, in disguise of a saint, fled from Dwarka with Subhadra in a chariot, in full view of Krishna and Vasudeva and the family members. After an arduous journey of three days and two nights, through mostly uninhabited forest area, they reached the valley near Bhadrajun where they decided to get married, before proceeding to Indraprastha, their capital. The marriage was conducted by a local Brahmin priest. Indra with Sachi came down to perform the wedding rituals. The Brahmin priest was given an earring (vali in local language) by Subhadra and a conch-shell by Arjuna as fee for performing their marriage. The village of the Brahmin was named thereafter as Sankhwali (in the word "sankavali", ‘sankh’ means ‘conch-shell’ and ‘vali’ means "ear ring"). It is also said that Balarama, though furious initially with Arjuna did not chase him to stop the marriage. He was persuaded by Krishna and Vasudeva to forgive Arjuna and Subhadra, given that they were in love with each other. Convinced of this fact, Balarama later sent gifts to his sister - gifts of jewellery, elephants, chariots, horses, servants and maidservants. Following this blessed marriage, Bhadrajun grew in population. A small temple in the name of Subhadra, popularly known as the "Dhumbda Mata", exists even now in a nearby mountain.

=== Early history ===
While the mythological history of Bhadrajun is traced to Arjuna and Subhadra who lived in the Dvapara Yuga, one of the four Hindu eras of Mahabharata; the history of Bhadrajun and the Marwar rulers of Jodhpur can only be traced from the 16th century. Several historic wars took place in Bhadrajun, initially against the Suri dynasty and later against the Mughal dynasty rulers.

The earliest ruler who occupied Bhadrajun was Thakur Rattan Singh, fifth son of Rao Maldeo, the Maharaja of Jodhpur in 1549. It was a feudal land under the Jodhpur kingdom, which had ten land lords who were called Rajas or Thikanas, out of a total of 1,891 land lords. These ten Rajas were known as Sirayats in the State of "Jodhpur Marwar". They held high positions in the court of Jodhpur. The Bhadrajun feudatory was also one of the ten feudatories which received special privileges in the court. In the seating arrangement in the Jodhpur court, the Raja of Bhadrajun was always seated to the right of the king, since he belonged to the king's lineage. Sixteen generations of Marwars ruled from Bhadrajun.

=== Lineage and wars ===
The first to rule from Bhadrajun was Raja Ratan Singh, son of Rao Maldeo (also known as Chandra Sen).

Maldeo of Jodhpur (also known as Maldeo Rathore), father of Ratan Singh, soon after becoming King of Marwar, launched war campaigns and successfully defeated the Sindhals and annexed Bhadrajun.

In 1543, Ratan Singh fought at Giri-Sumel against the invading army of Sher Shah Suri (the first ruler of Suri Dynasty), the then Emperor of India. He also fought a second battle at Merata, when he suffered injuries and was subsequently defeated by Viram Deo.

In 1563–64, the Rathores lost their capital city of Jhodpur to Pathan Malik, a commander of the Mughal Emperor Akbar, but they retained their territory around Bhadrajun. During this war, they could not sustain their army's needs as adequate provisions were not available inside the fort. Also, there was no help forthcoming from outside powers. Maldev Rathore abandoned the fort and reached Bhadarajun and remained there for seven years.

In 1651, Mukan Dasji of Bhadrajun fought against Raja Sawai Sur Singhji of Jodhpur in the battle against the Mughals at Mandavgarh. His bravery was duly rewarded with recognition of Bhadarajun as his jagir (estate) with a due patta (document).

When Emperor Aurangzeb's army attacked Jodhpur, Udai Bhanji of Bhadrajun fought for Maharaja Jaswant Singh and saved the Maharaja's life. As a reward, he married the niece of the Maharaja. Subsequently, he went to Peshawar to fight war against the Pathan’s. But in 1785, in the battle against the Mughal Emperor of India, he was killed. His wife, Jas Kanwar of Dodiali, committed Sati ('sati' was an act of self-immolation undertaken by the wife on the pyre of her husband, a practice prevalent then in many parts of India).

Subsequent rulers of Bhadrajun were also involved in several battles with the kingdom of Jodhpur and with other feudatories in the region. Finally, Bhadrajun merged with the Union of India, after India became independent in August 1947. The last scion of the dynasty, Raja Gopal Singh, now owns the estate and manages it as a heritage hotel.

== Monuments ==
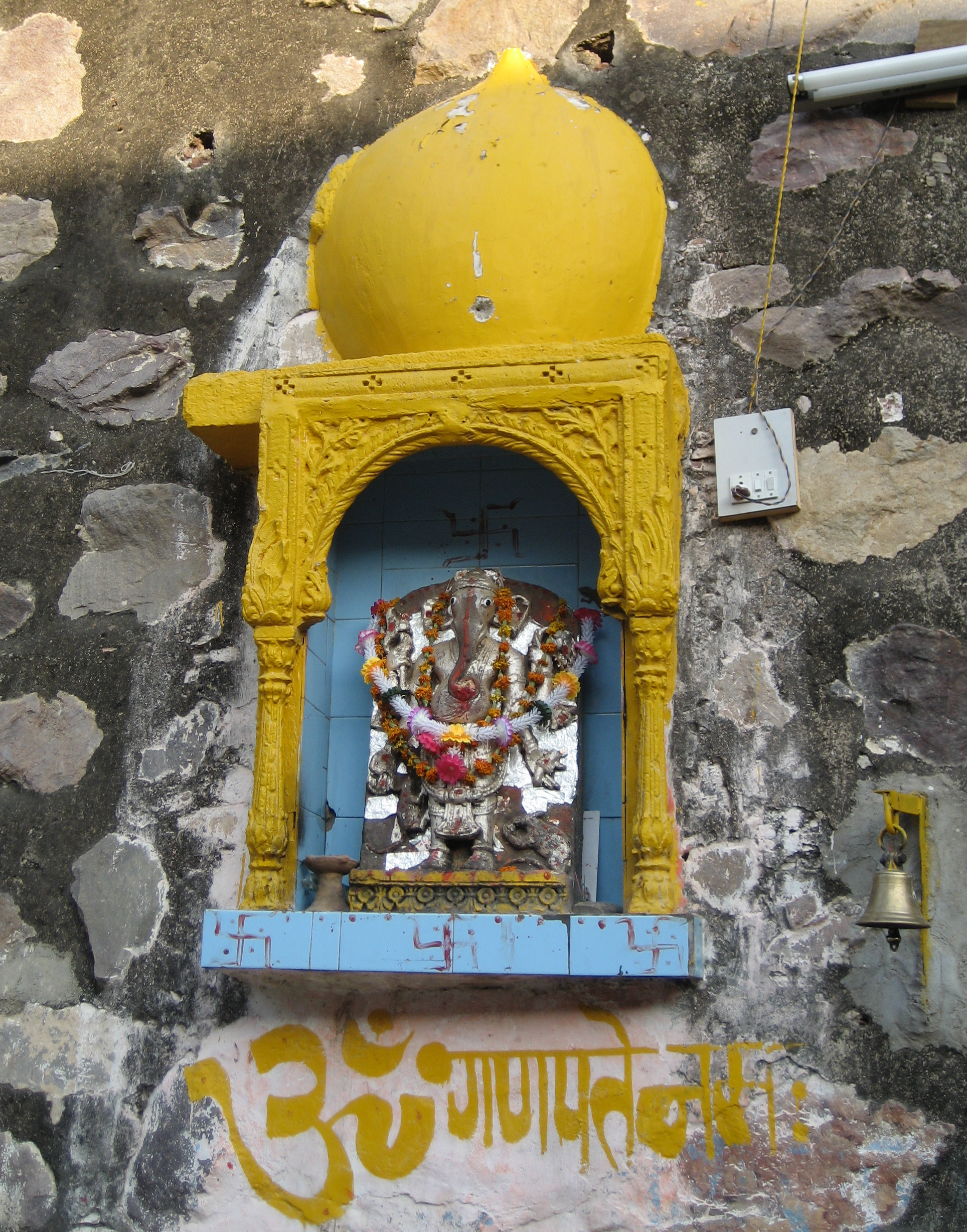
Ganesha on the wall of the fort

There are a number of historic monuments in and around the village Bhadrajun. The best known is the Bhadrajun fort due to its history and status as a heritage hotel.

=== Bhadrajun fort ===
The fort is constructed on top of the hill and although small, it was built as a strong hill fort. It is also strategically located in the village of Bhadrajun, which is also securely protected since it is enclosed in a horse shoe shape valley with one entry from the east. The fort walls are 20–30 feet (6.1–9.1 m) high, built at strategical locations around the village with a uniform width of 10 feet (3.0 m). Bastions, known as burjis, were built to erect canons and to eject arrows against invaders. The average elevation of the place is 2,000 feet (610 m) above m.s.l.

The fort is built on rugged hills with forest vegetation consisting of trees, cacti, bushes and rocks. The forest around the fort is inhabited by wildlife such as jackals, wild cats, blue bulls, hedgehogs and foxes. The fort has been converted into a luxury hotel, with 14 furnished rooms, all with a bathroom ensuite.

== Visitor information ==
Bhadrajun is 97 kilometres (60 mi) from Jodhpur. Jodhpur is well connected by road, rail and air links with rest of the country.

By road, Bhadrajun is 54 kilometres (34 mi) away from Jalore, the district headquarters, on the Jalore-Jodhpur state highway, 200 kilometres (120 mi) from Udaipur, 356 kilometres (221 mi) from Jaipur and 618 kilometres (384 mi) from Delhi.

Pali is the nearest railway station on the broad gauge line. The nearest airport is at Jodhpur, 97 kilometres (60 mi) away.
