= Phulad =

- rural
- Location in Rajasthan, India Phulad (India)
- Coordinates: 25.3667°N 73.4667°E
- Country: India
- State: Rajasthan
- District: Pali

Population (2001)
  - Total: 939

Languages
  - Official: Hindi
- Time zone: UTC+5:30 (IST)
- PIN: 306023
- Telephone code: 02935
- ISO 3166 code: RJ-IN
- Vehicle registration: RJ-22

Phulad is a village located in Marwar Junction tehsil of Pali district in Rajasthan state of India. Aravalli Range is nearby to the village. There is a railway station on Marwar Junction-Udaipur line. There is also a dam by the same name built in 1972.

== Demographics ==
The population of Phulad is 1939 according to the 2001 Census. The population in 2010 was 2500.
