= Sojat Road =

- census town
- Location in Rajasthan, India Sojat Road (India)
- Coordinates: 25.866°N 73.752°E
- Country: India
- State: Rajasthan
- District: Pali

Population (2011)
  - Total: 12,470

Languages
  - Official: Hindi
- Time zone: UTC+5:30 (IST)
- PIN: 306103
- Telephone code: 02960
- ISO 3166 code: RJ-IN
- Vehicle registration: RJ-22
- Sex ratio: 957 ♂/♀
- Website: https://sojat.in/

Sojat Road is a census town in Sojat tehsil of Pali district in the Indian state of Rajasthan. Sojat Road train station is located on Ajmer-Marwar Junction route and the most convenient method of traveling is by train.

== Geography ==
Sojat is located at 25.86°N 73.73°E and Pin Code of Sojat Road is 306103 which comes under Pali postal division (Jodhpur Region)

== Demographics ==
As of 2011 India census, Sojat Road had a population of 12,470. Males constitute 51% (6,372) of the population and females 49% (6,098). Sojat Road has an average literacy rate of 68.34%.male literacy is 77.7%, and female literacy is 58.5%. In Sojat Road, 13.5% of the population is under 6 years of age.
