= Sojat =

- City
- Nickname: Tamra Nagri
- Location in Rajasthan, India Sojat (India)
- Coordinates: 25.92°N 73.67°E
- Country: India
- State: Rajasthan
- District: Pali

Government
  - Body: municipality
- Elevation: 257 m (843 ft)

Population (2011)
  - Total: 100,000

Languages
  - Official: Hindi
- Time zone: UTC+5:30 (IST)
- PIN: 306104
- Telephone code: 02960
- Vehicle registration: RJ-22
- Sex ratio: 989 ♂/♀

Sojat is a city, a municipality and Tehsil headquarters in Pali district of Rajasthan state. It is situated on the left bank of the Sukri River. It is famous for its mehendi farms and production.

== History ==
There is also a large and famous fort situated on top of one of the hillock. The fort has a big reservoir and several temples.

== Geography ==
Sojat is located at 25.92°N 73.67°E. It has an average elevation of 257 metres (843 feet). The whole region lies on the way of "Aravali hills range" which is the oldest hill range in India.

== Demographics ==
As of the 2001 census, Sojat had a population of 50,061 in 9,205 households. The municipality had a sex ratio of 927 females per 1,000 males. Sojat has an average literacy rate of 66.7%, lower than the national average of 74.04%: male literacy is 77.7%, and female literacy is 55.5%. In Sojat, 13% of the population is under 6 years of age. Pin Code of Sojat is 306104 which comes under pali postal division (Jodhpur Region)

== Economy ==
Sojat is a hub of Mehndi (Henna) cultivation. Due to its favourable climatic conditions and soil, Sojat is the only region in India where henna is grown and are exported worldwide.

Sojat mehndi has now received the Geographical Indication (GI) certificate.
