= Jojawar =

- Village
- Location in Rajasthan, India Jojawar (India)
- Coordinates: 25.52°N 73.742°E
- Country: India
- State: Rajasthan
- District: Pali

Government
  - Body: Gram Panchayat

Population (2001)
  - Total: 7,462

Languages
  - Official: Hindi
- Time zone: UTC+5:30 (IST)
- PIN: 306022
- Telephone code: 02935
- Vehicle registration: RJ-22
- Sex ratio: 993 ♂/♀

Jojawar is a village located in Marwar Junction tehsil of Pali District in Rajasthan State, India. The mountains of the Aravalli Range are very near to this village. Jojawar is the location of the Jawahar Navodaya Vidyalaya school for Pali District, located about 1.5 km away on the Marwar Junction road.

Jojawar is located on a junction of important routes between Mewar and Marwar regions. The nearest railway stations are Phulad (metre gauge) 15 km distant, and Marwar Junction 35 km distant. All trains on the Jaipur-Mumbai route stop at Marwar Junction.

== History and surroundings ==
Jojawar has long been an important village in the Kantha area of Godwar Region. The village, located on the route to Mewar, controlled access to its valuable agricultural land. Numerous battles were fought nearby, and continued to be fought into the nineteenth century. Jojawar was traditionally a jagir of the Solanki Rajputs, who are an offshoot of Roopnagar. Thakur Askaran was given the Thikana of Jojawar by his father Thakur Sawant Singh of Desuri.

Rao Maldeo of Jodhpur took control of Jojawar around V.S. 1595 (1538 AD) and placed a checkpoint there. Raja Sur Sing's son, Kunwar Gaj Singh and Bhati Govinddas fought for control over Jojawar in V.S. 1670 (AD 1613). On behalf of Raja Sur Singh of Jodhpur, Bhati Govinddas was granted control of Jojawar by Mughal Emperor Jehangir, along with 84 other villages of Godwar. These villages were under control of Rana Amar Singh of Udaipur. But Jodhpur forces could not succeed in taking control of Jojawar.

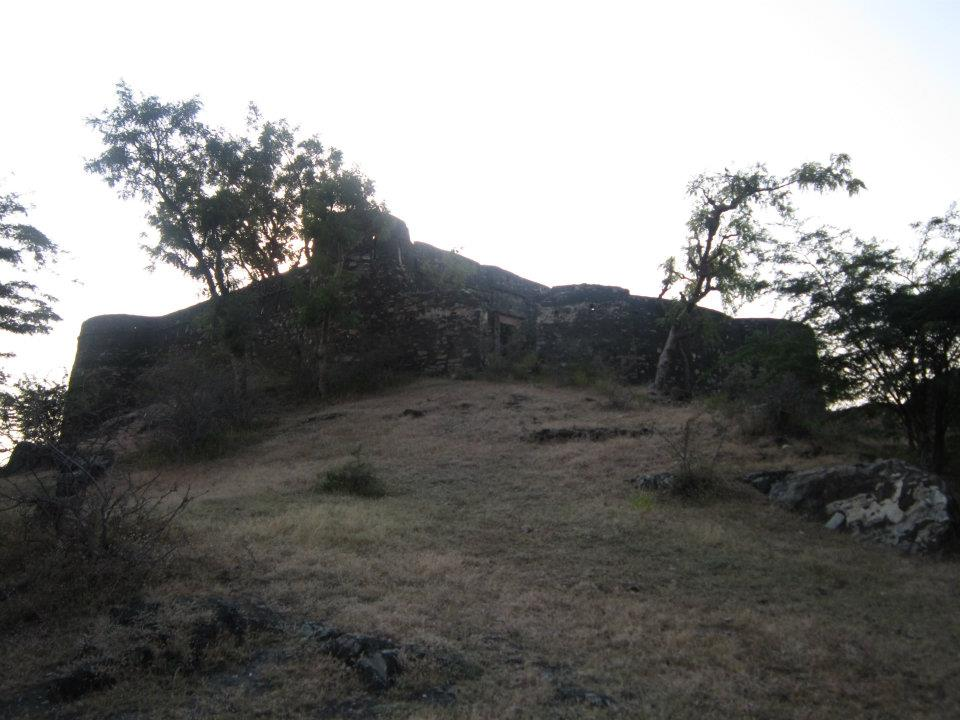
Fort in Jojawar Aravali hills

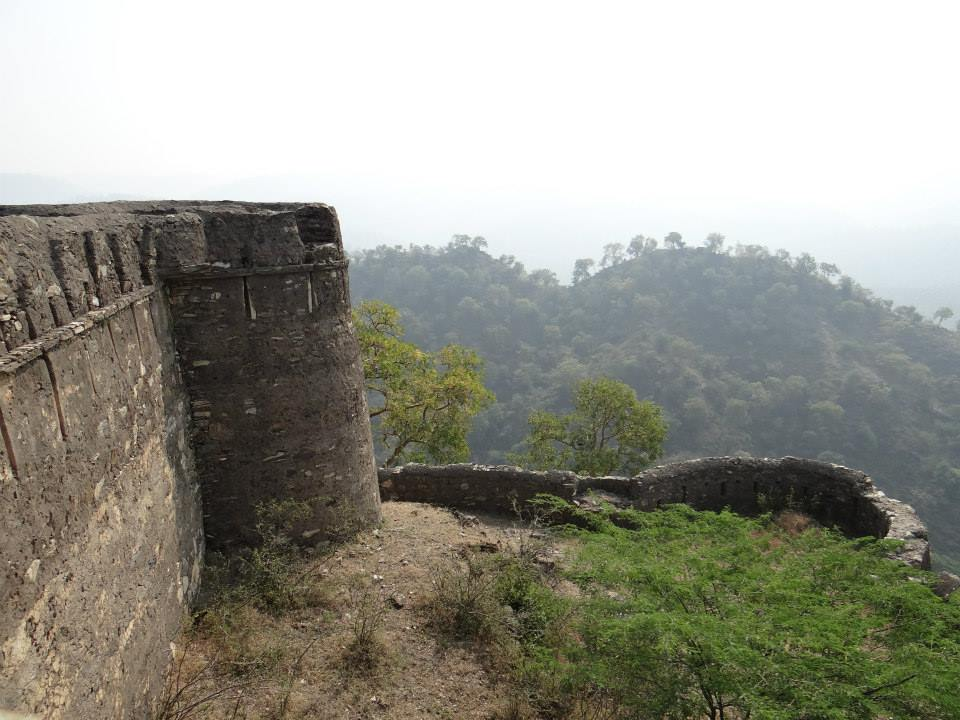
Fort in Jojawar Aravali

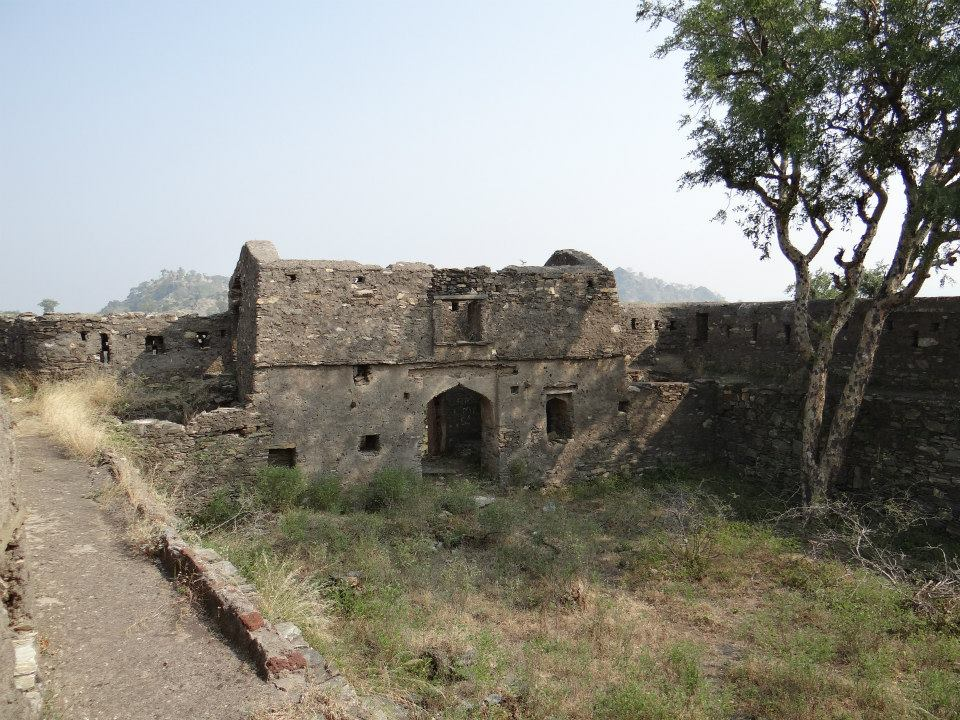
Fort in Jojawar Aravali

During Maharaja Vijay Singh, Godwar came under control of Jodhpur from Mewar. However, the Solanki of this region remained loyal to Rana of Udaipur and never accepted their rule, frequently fighting with Jodhpur forces. It remained in the hands of Solankis for around 250 years. Due to their reluctance to accept rule by the Jodhpur Kingdom, Maharaja Man Singh of Jodhpur awarded Jojawar to his maternal uncle Chauhan Shyam Singh in V.S. 1864 (AD 1807), but Shyam Singh died during a siege of Jodhpur Fort that year.

An old fort around 300 years old, built by Solanki Rajputs of the region stands in the nearby Aravali hills.

== Demographics ==
Population of Jojawar is 7,462 according to census 2001 where male population is 3,743 while female population is 3,719.
