= Barwa =

Barwa may refer to:

== Places ==
in India

- Barwa, Narkatiaganj (census code 216634), a village in West Champaran district of Bihar, India
- Barwa, Narkatiaganj (census code 216656), a village in West Champaran district of Bihar, India
- Barwa Barauli, a village in West Champaran district of Bihar, India
- Barwa, Rajasthan
- Barwa, Nawanshahr, a village in Shaheed Bhagat Singh Nagar district of Punjab State, India.

Elsewhere

- a town in present Pakistan, formerly capital of Jandol State, a princely Frontier State in British India's Northwest Frontier Province

== Other uses ==
- Barwa (raga)

== See also ==
- Barwar (disambiguation)
- Beerwah (disambiguation)
