= Bangurgram Halt railway station =

Railway station in Rajasthan, India

Bangurgram Halt

General information
- Location: Makreda, Beawar district, Rajasthan; India
- Coordinates: 26°08′24″N 74°20′54″E
- Elevation: 435 metres (1,427 ft)
- System: Indian Railways station
- Owner: Indian Railways
- Operator: North Western Railway
- Line: Ahmedabad–Jaipur line
- Platforms: 2
- Tracks: Double Electric-Line

Construction
- Structure type: Standard (on ground)

Other information
- Status: Functioning
- Station code: BNGM
- Zone(s): North Western Railway zone
- Division(s): Ajmer

Services
Preceding station	Indian Railways	Following station
Piplaj towards ?	North Western Railway zone Ahmedabad–Jaipur line	Beawar towards ?
Location
- Interactive map

Bangurgram Halt railway station is a halt railway station in located on Ahmedabad–Jaipur railway line operated by the North Western Railway under Ajmer railway division. It is situated at Makreda in Beawar district in the Indian state of Rajasthan.
