= Nana railway station =

Railway station in Rajasthan, India

Nana

General information
- Location: State Highway 62, Nana, Pali district, Rajasthan; India
- Coordinates: 24°55′33″N 73°06′36″E
- Elevation: 355 metres (1,165 ft)
- System: Indian Railways station
- Owner: Indian Railways
- Operator: North Western Railway
- Line: Ahmedabad–Jaipur line
- Platforms: 2
- Tracks: Double Electric-Line

Construction
- Structure type: Standard (on ground)

Other information
- Status: Functioning
- Station code: NANA
- Zone(s): North Western Railway zone
- Division(s): Ajmer

Services
Preceding station	Indian Railways	Following station
Kothar towards ?	North Western Railway zone Ahmedabad–Jaipur line	Keshavganj towards ?
Location
- Interactive map

Nana railway station is a railway station in located on Ahmedabad–Jaipur railway line operated by the North Western Railway under Ajmer railway division. It is situated beside State Highway 62 at Nana in Pali district in the Indian state of Rajasthan.

== Name ==
The station's name refers a maternal grandfather in India. There are also some railway stations like Sali, Diwana, and Saheli which refer to relationships.
