= Banta Raghunathgarh railway station =

Railway station in Rajasthan, India

Banta Raghunathgarh

General information
- Location: Banta, Pali district, Rajasthan; India
- Coordinates: 25°36′07″N 73°31′39″E
- Elevation: 266 metres (873 ft)
- System: Indian Railways station
- Owner: Indian Railways
- Operator: North Western Railway
- Line: Ahmedabad–Jaipur line
- Platforms: 1
- Tracks: Double Electric-Line

Construction
- Structure type: Standard (on ground)

Other information
- Status: Functioning
- Station code: BGG
- Zone(s): North Western Railway zone
- Division(s): Ajmer

Services
Preceding station	Indian Railways	Following station
Auwa towards ?	North Western Railway zone Ahmedabad–Jaipur line	Bhinwaliya towards ?
Location
- Interactive map

Banta Raghunathgarh railway station is a railway station in located on Ahmedabad–Jaipur railway line operated by the North Western Railway under Ajmer railway division. It is situated at Banta in Pali district in the Indian state of Rajasthan.
