= Bhinwaliya railway station =

Railway station in Rajasthan, India

Bhinwaliya

General information
- Location: Inderwara, Pali district, Rajasthan; India
- Coordinates: 25°33′35″N 73°29′33″E
- Elevation: 268 metres (879 ft)
- System: Indian Railways station
- Owner: Indian Railways
- Operator: North Western Railway
- Line: Ahmedabad–Jaipur line
- Platforms: 2
- Tracks: Double Electric-Line

Construction
- Structure type: Standard (on ground)

Other information
- Status: Functioning
- Station code: BWA
- Zone(s): North Western Railway zone
- Division(s): Ajmer

Services
Preceding station	Indian Railways	Following station
Banta Raghunathgarh towards ?	North Western Railway zone Ahmedabad–Jaipur line	Somesar towards ?
Location
- Interactive map

Bhinwaliya railway station is a railway station in located on Ahmedabad–Jaipur railway line operated by the North Western Railway under Ajmer railway division. It is situated at Inderwara in Pali district in the Indian state of Rajasthan.
