= Somesar railway station =

Railway station in Rajasthan, India

Somesar

General information
- Location: State Highway 67, Somesar, Pali district, Rajasthan; India
- Coordinates: 25°31′13″N 73°27′04″E
- Elevation: 269 metres (883 ft)
- System: Indian Railways station
- Owner: Indian Railways
- Operator: North Western Railway
- Line: Ahmedabad–Jaipur line
- Platforms: 2
- Tracks: Double Electric-Line

Construction
- Structure type: Standard (on ground)

Other information
- Status: Functioning
- Station code: SOS
- Zone(s): North Western Railway zone
- Division(s): Ajmer

Services
Preceding station	Indian Railways	Following station
Bhinwaliya towards ?	North Western Railway zone Ahmedabad–Jaipur line	Jawali towards ?
Location
- Interactive map

Somesar railway station is a railway station in located on Ahmedabad–Jaipur railway line operated by the North Western Railway under Ajmer railway division. It is situated beside State Highway 67, at Somesar in Pali district in the Indian state of Rajasthan.
