= Keshavganj railway station =

Railway station in Rajasthan, India

Keshavganj

General information
- Location: Keshavganj, Sirohi district, Rajasthan; India
- Coordinates: 24°51′22″N 73°04′17″E
- Elevation: 392 metres (1,286 ft)
- System: Indian Railways station
- Owner: Indian Railways
- Operator: North Western Railway
- Line: Ahmedabad–Jaipur line
- Platforms: 2
- Tracks: Double Electric-Line

Construction
- Structure type: Standard (on ground)

Other information
- Status: Functioning
- Station code: KVJ
- Zone(s): North Western Railway zone
- Division(s): Ajmer

Services
Preceding station	Indian Railways	Following station
Nana towards ?	North Western Railway zone Ahmedabad–Jaipur line	Sirohi Road towards ?
Location
- Interactive map

Keshavganj railway station is a railway station in located on Ahmedabad–Jaipur railway line operated by the North Western Railway under Ajmer railway division. It is situated at Keshavganj in Sirohi district in the Indian state of Rajasthan.
