= Jawali =

Jawali may refer to:

- Jawali, Maharashtra
- Jawali, Rajasthan
- Jawali, Himachal Pradesh
- Jawali Taluka, Maharashtra
- Jawali Saqawa, atabeg of Mosul
