= Maval railway station =

Railway station in Rajasthan, India

Maval

General information
- Location: Abu Road-Palanpur Highway, Maval, Sirohi district, Rajasthan; India
- Coordinates: 24°25′56″N 72°42′02″E
- Elevation: 243 metres (797 ft)
- System: Indian Railways station
- Owner: Indian Railways
- Operator: North Western Railway
- Line: Ahmedabad–Jaipur line
- Platforms: 2
- Tracks: Double Electric-Line

Construction
- Structure type: Standard (on ground)

Other information
- Status: Functioning
- Station code: MAA
- Zone(s): North Western Railway zone
- Division(s): Ajmer

Services
Preceding station	Indian Railways	Following station
Abu Road towards ?	North Western Railway zone Ahmedabad–Jaipur line	Shri Amirgadh towards ?
Location
- Interactive map

Maval railway station is a railway station in located on Ahmedabad–Jaipur railway line operated by the North Western Railway under Ajmer railway division. It is situated beside Abu Road-Palanpur Highway at Maval in Sirohi district in the Indian state of Rajasthan.
