= Sirohi Road railway station =

Railway station in Rajasthan, India

Sirohi Road

General information
- Location: State Highway 62, Sirohi Road, Pindwara, Sirohi district, Rajasthan; India
- Coordinates: 24°47′28″N 73°02′23″E
- Elevation: 373 metres (1,224 ft)
- System: Indian Railways station
- Owner: Indian Railways
- Operator: North Western Railway
- Line: Ahmedabad–Jaipur line
- Platforms: 2
- Tracks: Double Electric-Line

Construction
- Structure type: Standard (on ground)

Other information
- Status: Functioning
- Station code: SOH
- Zone(s): North Western Railway zone
- Division(s): Ajmer

Services
Preceding station	Indian Railways	Following station
Keshavganj towards ?	North Western Railway zone Ahmedabad–Jaipur line	Banas towards ?
Location
- Interactive map

Sirohi Road railway station is a railway station in located on Ahmedabad–Jaipur railway line operated by the North Western Railway under Ajmer railway division. It is situated beside State Highway 62, Sirohi Road, at Pindwara in Sirohi district in the Indian state of Rajasthan.
