= Haripur railway station =

Railway station in Rajasthan, India

Haripur

General information
- Location: Haripur, Pali district, Rajasthan; India
- Coordinates: 26°00′45″N 74°01′30″E
- Elevation: 315 metres (1,033 ft)
- System: Indian Railways station
- Owner: Indian Railways
- Operator: North Western Railway
- Line: Ahmedabad–Jaipur line
- Platforms: 2
- Tracks: Double Electric-Line

Construction
- Structure type: Standard (on ground)

Other information
- Status: Functioning
- Station code: HP
- Zone(s): North Western Railway zone
- Division(s): Ajmer

Services
Preceding station	Indian Railways	Following station
Bar (India) towards ?	North Western Railway zone Ahmedabad–Jaipur line	Guriya towards ?
Location
- Interactive map

Haripur railway station is a railway station in located on Ahmedabad–Jaipur railway line operated by the North Western Railway under Ajmer railway division. It is situated at Haripur in Pali district in the Indian state of Rajasthan.
