= Auwa =

- Village
- Location in Rajasthan, India Auwa (India)
- Coordinates: 25.6667°N 73.7167°E
- Country: India
- State: Rajasthan
- District: Pali
- Elevation: 289 m (948 ft)

Population (2001)
  - Total: 4,202

Languages
  - Official: Hindi
- Time zone: UTC+5:30 (IST)
- Telephone code: 02935
- Vehicle registration: RJ-22
- Sex ratio: 997 ♂/♀

Auwa is a village in the Marwar Junction tehsil of Pali district in Rajasthan, India. The village is situated 13 km from Marwar Junction railway station.

== History ==
=== Dharna by Charans ===
In 1586 AD (V.S. 1643), on the 13th day of Shukla paksha of Chaitra month, following the death of the King Maldev Rathore of Jodhpur State, his eldest son Chandrasen Rathore became king. But Chandrasen's younger brother usurped him with the help of the Mughal emperor Akbar. Charans opposed him. For staging a dharna against the king they were going to Mewar; the Auwa Jagirdar Gopal Das Champawat supported them and suggested that they stage the dharna in his village. The Charans selected the land on the bank of the Sukri river, in front of Kajleshwar Mahadev Temple to stage their dharna. They started the dharna on the 13th and fasted until the full moon. From the third day they started taking their lives by performing Taaga (Dhaaga) and Teliya. The King's trusted Charan friend, Akha Barahath, and his trumpeter (nagarchi) Govind Ji Damami came there to stop them but Akhaji Barahath himself joined his Charan brethren and was killed with other Charans even though Govind Ji Damami sacrificed his life so as to prevent the Charans from killing themselves.

== 1857 Revolt ==
The village is known for the siege of the Auwa fort by British forces in 1857 when various Rajputs of Pali region under the stewardship of Thakur Kushal Singh Rathore of Auwa confronted the British. Auwa fort was surrounded by the British army and the conflict lasted many days. The fort and village still carry the scars of that siege. Captain Mason was shot dead for insulting the Thakur and his severed head was hung at the fort gate. The British destroyed the fort and the palace. Even temples and their idols were not spared. The statue of the goddess Mahakali brought to Ajmer is still kept in the Ajmer Museum. A still existent cenotaph was raised for Mason by the British. The fort has today been converted into a hotel.

== Demographics ==
The population of Auwa was 4,202 according to the 2001 census, 2,104 males and 2,098 females. The place is surrounded by small villages by name Deoli, Jojawar, Kherwa, Ranawas etc.

== Transport ==
Auwa railway station is a railway station is the nearest station of Auwa, situated on Ahmedabad–Jaipur railway line operated by the North Western Railway under Ajmer railway division.
