= Khimel railway station =

Railway station in Rajasthan, India

Khimel

General information
- Location: Khimel, Pali district, Rajasthan; India
- Coordinates: 25°18′01″N 73°16′46″E
- Elevation: 279 metres (915 ft)
- System: Indian Railways station
- Owner: Indian Railways
- Operator: North Western Railway
- Line: Ahmedabad–Jaipur line
- Platforms: 2
- Tracks: Double Electric-Line

Construction
- Structure type: Standard (on ground)

Other information
- Status: Functioning
- Station code: KZQ
- Zone(s): North Western Railway zone
- Division(s): Ajmer

Services
Preceding station	Indian Railways	Following station
Rani towards ?	North Western Railway zone Ahmedabad–Jaipur line	Falna towards ?
Location
- Interactive map

Khimel railway station is a railway station in located on Ahmedabad–Jaipur railway line operated by the North Western Railway under Ajmer railway division. It is situated at Khimel in Pali district in the Indian state of Rajasthan.
