= Bagri Sajjanpur railway station =

Railway station in Rajasthan, India

Bagri Sajjanpur

General information
- Location: Beawar-Pindwara Road, Sojat Tehsil, Pali district, Rajasthan; India
- Coordinates: 25°55′00″N 73°49′19″E
- Elevation: 298 metres (978 ft)
- System: Indian Railways station
- Owner: Indian Railways
- Operator: North Western Railway
- Line: Ahmedabad–Jaipur line
- Platforms: 2
- Tracks: Double Electric-Line

Construction
- Structure type: Standard (on ground)

Other information
- Status: Functioning
- Station code: BGX
- Zone(s): North Western Railway zone
- Division(s): Ajmer

Services
Preceding station	Indian Railways	Following station
Chandawal towards ?	North Western Railway zone Ahmedabad–Jaipur line	Bagri Nagar towards ?
Location
- Interactive map

Bagri Sajjanpur railway station is a railway station in located on Ahmedabad–Jaipur railway line operated by the North Western Railway under Ajmer railway division. It is situated beside Beawar-Pindwara Road at Sojat Tehsil in Pali district in the Indian state of Rajasthan.
