= Bar railway station (India) =

Railway station in Rajasthan, India

Bar

General information
- Location: Bar, Raipur Tehsil, Pali district, Rajasthan; India
- Coordinates: 26°03′47″N 74°06′47″E
- Elevation: 382 metres (1,253 ft)
- System: Indian Railways station
- Owner: Indian Railways
- Operator: North Western Railway
- Line: Ahmedabad–Jaipur line
- Platforms: 2
- Tracks: Double Electric-Line

Construction
- Structure type: Standard (on ground)

Other information
- Status: Functioning
- Station code: BAR
- Zone(s): North Western Railway zone
- Division(s): Ajmer

Services
Preceding station	Indian Railways	Following station
Sendra towards ?	North Western Railway zone Ahmedabad–Jaipur line	Haripur towards ?
Location
- Interactive map

Bar railway station is a railway station in located on Ahmedabad–Jaipur railway line operated by the North Western Railway under Ajmer railway division. It is situated at Bar, Raipur Tehsil in Pali district in the Indian state of Rajasthan.
