= Chitrasani railway station =

Railway station in Gujarat, India

Chitrasani

General information
- Location: State Highway 54, Chitrasani, Banaskantha district, Gujarat; India
- Coordinates: 24°16′03″N 72°29′19″E
- Elevation: 227 metres (745 ft)
- System: Indian Railways station
- Owner: Indian Railways
- Operator: North Western Railway
- Line: Ahmedabad–Jaipur line
- Platforms: 2
- Tracks: Double Electric-Line

Construction
- Structure type: Standard (on ground)

Other information
- Status: Functioning
- Station code: CTT
- Zone(s): North Western Railway zone
- Division(s): Ajmer

Services
Preceding station	Indian Railways	Following station
Jethi towards ?	North Western Railway zone Ahmedabad–Jaipur line	Karjoda towards ?
Location
- Interactive map

Chitrasani railway station is a railway station in located on Ahmedabad–Jaipur railway line operated by the North Western Railway under Ajmer railway division. It is situated beside the State Highway 54 at Chitrasani at in Banaskantha district in the Indian state of Gujarat.

== Incident ==
In May 2019, a young labourer, Sani Dev Tai, died after a tree fell on this railway station, three persons were also injured. There is a Dargah in Chitrasani railway station. The railway line was diverted for the shrine. There is no other place from Ahmedabad to Jodhpur where there is a pilgrimage site between two railway lines.
