= Lamana railway station =

Railway station in Rajasthan, India

Lamana

General information
- Location: Lamana, Ajmer district, Rajasthan; India
- Coordinates: 26°14′42″N 74°27′56″E
- Elevation: 441 metres (1,447 ft)
- System: Indian Railways station
- Owner: Indian Railways
- Operator: North Western Railway
- Line: Ahmedabad–Jaipur line
- Platforms: 2
- Tracks: Double Electric-Line

Construction
- Structure type: Standard (on ground)

Other information
- Status: Functioning
- Station code: LNA
- Zone(s): North Western Railway zone
- Division(s): Ajmer

Services
Preceding station	Indian Railways	Following station
Mangaliyawas towards ?	North Western Railway zone Ahmedabad–Jaipur line	Kharwa towards ?
Location
- Interactive map

Lamana railway station is a railway station in located on Ahmedabad–Jaipur railway line operated by the North Western Railway under Ajmer railway division. It is situated at Lamana in Ajmer district in the Indian state of Rajasthan.
