= Mori Bera railway station =

Railway station in Rajasthan, India

Mori Bera

General information
- Location: Rughnathpura, Pali district, Rajasthan; India
- Coordinates: 25°02′08″N 73°08′11″E
- Elevation: 324 metres (1,063 ft)
- System: Indian Railways station
- Owner: Indian Railways
- Operator: North Western Railway
- Line: Ahmedabad–Jaipur line
- Platforms: 2
- Tracks: Double Electric-Line

Construction
- Structure type: Standard (on ground)

Other information
- Status: Functioning
- Station code: MOI
- Zone(s): North Western Railway zone
- Division(s): Ajmer

Services
Preceding station	Indian Railways	Following station
Sumerpur Jawai Bandh towards ?	North Western Railway zone Ahmedabad–Jaipur line	Kothar towards ?
Location
- Interactive map

Mori Bera railway station is a railway station in located on Ahmedabad–Jaipur railway line operated by the North Western Railway under Ajmer railway division. It is situated at Rughnathpura in Pali district in the Indian state of Rajasthan.
