= Chandawal railway station =

Railway station in Rajasthan, India

Chandawal

General information
- Location: Chandawal, Pali district, Rajasthan; India
- Coordinates: 25°56′48″N 73°52′08″E
- Elevation: 304 metres (997 ft)
- System: Indian Railways station
- Owner: Indian Railways
- Operator: North Western Railway
- Line: Ahmedabad–Jaipur line
- Platforms: 2
- Tracks: Double Electric-Line

Construction
- Structure type: Standard (on ground)

Other information
- Status: Functioning
- Station code: CNL
- Zone(s): North Western Railway zone
- Division(s): Ajmer

Services
Preceding station	Indian Railways	Following station
Guriya towards ?	North Western Railway zone Ahmedabad–Jaipur line	Bagri Sajjanpur towards ?
Location
- Interactive map

Chandawal railway station is a railway station in located on Ahmedabad–Jaipur railway line operated by the North Western Railway under Ajmer railway division. It is situated at Chandawal in Pali district in the Indian state of Rajasthan.
