= Sarotra Road railway station =

Railway station in Gujarat, India

Sarotra Road

General information
- Location: Sarotra, Banaskantha district, Gujarat; India
- Coordinates: 24°22′38″N 72°35′31″E
- Elevation: 272 metres (892 ft)
- System: Indian Railways station
- Owner: Indian Railways
- Operator: North Western Railway
- Line: Ahmedabad–Jaipur line
- Platforms: 2
- Tracks: Double Electric-Line

Construction
- Structure type: Standard (on ground)

Other information
- Status: Functioning
- Station code: SZA
- Zone(s): North Western Railway zone
- Division(s): Ajmer

Services
| Preceding station | Indian Railways | Following station |
|---|---|---|
| Shri Amirgadh towards ? | North Western Railway zone Ahmedabad–Jaipur line | Iqbal Gadh towards ? |
Location
- Interactive map

Sarotra Road railway station is a railway station in located on Ahmedabad–Jaipur railway line operated by the North Western Railway under Ajmer railway division. It is situated at Sarotra in Banaskantha district in the Indian state of Gujarat.
