= Iqbal Gadh railway station =

Railway station in Gujarat, India

Iqbal Gadh

General information
- Location: Iqbalgarh, Banaskantha district, Gujarat; India
- Coordinates: 24°20′46″N 72°32′02″E
- Elevation: 229 metres (751 ft)
- System: Indian Railways station
- Owner: Indian Railways
- Operator: North Western Railway
- Line: Ahmedabad–Jaipur line
- Platforms: 2
- Tracks: Double Electric-Line

Construction
- Structure type: Standard (on ground)

Other information
- Status: Functioning
- Station code: IQG
- Zone(s): North Western Railway zone
- Division(s): Ajmer

Services
Preceding station	Indian Railways	Following station
Sarotra Road towards ?	North Western Railway zone Ahmedabad–Jaipur line	Jethi towards ?
Location
- Interactive map

Iqbal Gadh railway station is a railway station in located on Ahmedabad–Jaipur railway line operated by the North Western Railway under Ajmer railway division. It is situated at Iqbalgarh in Banaskantha district in the Indian state of Gujarat.
