= Bagri Nagar railway station =

Railway station in Rajasthan, India

Bagri Nagar

General information
- Location: Khokhara, Bagrinagar, Pali district, Rajasthan; India
- Coordinates: 25°53′45″N 73°47′16″E
- Elevation: 295 metres (968 ft)
- System: Indian Railways station
- Owner: Indian Railways
- Operator: North Western Railway
- Line: Ahmedabad–Jaipur line
- Platforms: 2
- Tracks: Double Electric-Line

Construction
- Structure type: Standard (on ground)

Other information
- Status: Functioning
- Station code: BQN
- Zone(s): North Western Railway zone
- Division(s): Ajmer

Services
Preceding station	Indian Railways	Following station
Bagri Sajjanpur towards ?	North Western Railway zone Ahmedabad–Jaipur line	Sojat Road towards ?
Location
- Interactive map

Bagri Nagar railway station is a railway station in located on Ahmedabad–Jaipur railway line operated by the North Western Railway under Ajmer railway division. It is situated at Khokhara, Bagrinagar in Pali district in the Indian state of Rajasthan.
