= Bhagwanpura railway station =

Railway station in Rajasthan, India

Bhagwanpura

General information
- Location: Bhagwanpura, Pali district, Rajasthan; India
- Coordinates: 25°25′08″N 73°21′48″E
- Elevation: 275 metres (902 ft)
- System: Indian Railways station
- Owner: Indian Railways
- Operator: North Western Railway
- Line: Ahmedabad–Jaipur line
- Platforms: 2
- Tracks: Double Electric-Line

Construction
- Structure type: Standard (on ground)

Other information
- Status: Non Functioning
- Station code: BGPR
- Zone(s): North Western Railway zone
- Division(s): Ajmer

Services
Preceding station	Indian Railways	Following station
Jawali towards ?	North Western Railway zone Ahmedabad–Jaipur line	Rani towards ?
Location
- Interactive map

Bhagwanpura railway station is a non functioning railway station in located on Ahmedabad–Jaipur railway line operated by the North Western Railway under Ajmer railway division. It is situated at Bhagwanpura in Pali district in the Indian state of Rajasthan.
