= Auwa railway station =

Railway station in Rajasthan, India

Auwa

General information
- Location: Auwa, Pali district, Rajasthan; India
- Coordinates: 25°39′55″N 73°33′53″E
- Elevation: 265 metres (869 ft)
- System: Indian Railways station
- Owner: Indian Railways
- Operator: North Western Railway
- Line: Ahmedabad–Jaipur line
- Platforms: 2
- Tracks: Double Electric-Line

Construction
- Structure type: Standard (on ground)

Other information
- Status: Functioning
- Station code: AUWA
- Zone(s): North Western Railway zone
- Division(s): Ajmer

Services
Preceding station	Indian Railways	Following station
Marwar Junction towards ?	North Western Railway zone Ahmedabad–Jaipur line	Banta Raghunathgarh towards ?
Location
- Interactive map

Auwa railway station is a railway station in located on Ahmedabad–Jaipur railway line operated by the North Western Railway under Ajmer railway division. It is situated at Auwa in Pali district in the Indian state of Rajasthan.
