= Swarupganj railway station =

Railway station in Rajasthan, India

Swarupganj

General information
- Location: Main Market, Swarupganj, Sirohi district, Rajasthan; India
- Coordinates: 24°39′29″N 72°55′55″E
- Elevation: 342 metres (1,122 ft)
- System: Indian Railways station
- Owner: Indian Railways
- Operator: North Western Railway
- Line: Ahmedabad–Jaipur line
- Platforms: 2
- Tracks: Double Electric-Line

Construction
- Structure type: Standard (on ground)

Other information
- Status: Functioning
- Station code: SRPJ
- Zone(s): North Western Railway zone
- Division(s): Ajmer

Services
Preceding station	Indian Railways	Following station
Banas towards ?	North Western Railway zone Ahmedabad–Jaipur line	Bhimana towards ?
Location
- Interactive map

Swarupganj railway station is a railway station in located on Ahmedabad–Jaipur railway line operated by the North Western Railway under Ajmer railway division. It is situated at Main Market, Swarupganj in Sirohi district in the Indian state of Rajasthan.
