= Bhesana railway station =

Railway station in Rajasthan, India

Bhesana

General information
- Location: Bhesana, Pali district, Rajasthan; India
- Coordinates: 25°49′28″N 73°43′05″E
- Elevation: 284 metres (932 ft)
- System: Indian Railways station
- Owner: Indian Railways
- Operator: North Western Railway
- Line: Ahmedabad–Jaipur line
- Platforms: 2
- Tracks: Double Electric-Line

Construction
- Structure type: Standard (on ground)

Other information
- Status: Functioning
- Station code: BFY
- Zone(s): North Western Railway zone
- Division(s): Ajmer

Services
Preceding station	Indian Railways	Following station
Sojat Road towards ?	North Western Railway zone Ahmedabad–Jaipur line	Dhareshwar towards ?
Location
- Interactive map

Bhesana railway station is a railway station in located on Ahmedabad–Jaipur railway line operated by the North Western Railway under Ajmer railway division. It is situated at Bhesana in Pali district in the Indian state of Rajasthan.
