= Mangaliyawas railway station =

Railway station in Rajasthan, India

General information
- Location: Mangliyawas, Ajmer district, Rajasthan; India
- Coordinates: 26°16′42″N 74°29′34″E
- Elevation: 430 metres (1,410 ft)
- System: Indian Railways station
- Owner: Indian Railways
- Operator: North Western Railway
- Line: Ahmedabad–Jaipur line
- Platforms: 2
- Tracks: Double Electric-Line

Construction
- Structure type: Standard (on ground)

Other information
- Status: Functioning
- Station code: MLI
- Zone(s): North Western Railway zone
- Division(s): Ajmer

Services
| Preceding station | Indian Railways | Following station |
|---|---|---|
| Makrera towards ? | North Western Railway zone Ahmedabad–Jaipur line | Lamana towards ? |
Location
- Interactive map

Mangaliyawas railway station is a railway station in located on Ahmedabad–Jaipur railway line operated by the North Western Railway under Ajmer railway division. It is situated at Mangliyawas in Ajmer district in the Indian state of Rajasthan.
