= Karjoda railway station =

Railway station in Gujarat, India

Karjoda

General information
- Location: Chhapi, Karjoda, Banaskantha district, Gujarat; India
- Coordinates: 24°13′06″N 72°27′20″E
- Elevation: 234 metres (768 ft)
- System: Indian Railways station
- Owner: Indian Railways
- Operator: North Western Railway
- Line: Ahmedabad–Jaipur line
- Platforms: 2
- Tracks: Double Electric-Line

Construction
- Structure type: Standard (on ground)

Other information
- Status: Functioning
- Station code: KRJD
- Zone(s): North Western Railway zone
- Division(s): Ajmer

Services
Preceding station	Indian Railways	Following station
Chitrasani towards ?	North Western Railway zone Ahmedabad–Jaipur line	Palanpur Junction towards ?
Location
- Interactive map

Karjoda railway station is a railway station in located on Ahmedabad–Jaipur railway line operated by the North Western Railway under Ajmer railway division. It is situated at Chhapi, Karjoda in Banaskantha district in the Indian state of Gujarat.
