= Kivarli railway station =

Railway station in Rajasthan, India

Kivarli

General information
- Location: Kivarli Road, Kivarli, Sirohi district, Rajasthan; India
- Coordinates: 24°32′26″N 72°50′33″E
- Elevation: 281 metres (922 ft)
- System: Indian Railways station
- Owner: Indian Railways
- Operator: North Western Railway
- Line: Ahmedabad–Jaipur line
- Platforms: 2
- Tracks: Double Electric-Line

Construction
- Structure type: Standard (on ground)

Other information
- Status: Functioning
- Station code: KWI
- Zone(s): North Western Railway zone
- Division(s): Ajmer

Services
Preceding station	Indian Railways	Following station
Bhimana towards ?	North Western Railway zone Ahmedabad–Jaipur line	Morthala towards ?
Location
- Interactive map

Kivarli railway station is a railway station in located on Ahmedabad–Jaipur railway line operated by the North Western Railway under Ajmer railway division. It is situated beside Kivarli Road at Kivarli in Sirohi district in the Indian state of Rajasthan.
