= Morthala railway station =

Railway station in Rajasthan, India

Morthala

General information
- Location: Banas Road, Morthala, Sirohi district, Rajasthan; India
- Coordinates: 24°30′09″N 72°48′12″E
- Elevation: 247 metres (810 ft)
- System: Indian Railways station
- Owner: Indian Railways
- Operator: North Western Railway
- Line: Ahmedabad–Jaipur line
- Platforms: 2
- Tracks: Double Electric-Line

Construction
- Structure type: Standard (on ground)

Other information
- Status: Functioning
- Station code: MXO
- Zone(s): North Western Railway zone
- Division(s): Ajmer

Services
Preceding station	Indian Railways	Following station
Kivarli towards ?	North Western Railway zone Ahmedabad–Jaipur line	Abu Road towards ?
Location
- Interactive map

Morthala railway station is a railway station in located on Ahmedabad–Jaipur railway line operated by the North Western Railway under Ajmer railway division. It is situated beside Banas Road at Morthala in Sirohi district in the Indian state of Rajasthan.
