= Bhimana railway station =

Railway station in Rajasthan, India

Bhimana

General information
- Location: Abu Road, Bhimana, Sirohi district, Rajasthan; India
- Coordinates: 24°35′44″N 72°53′11″E
- Elevation: 313 metres (1,027 ft)
- System: Indian Railways station
- Owner: Indian Railways
- Operator: North Western Railway
- Line: Ahmedabad–Jaipur line
- Platforms: 2
- Tracks: Double Electric-Line

Construction
- Structure type: Standard (on ground)

Other information
- Status: Functioning
- Station code: BMN
- Zone(s): North Western Railway zone
- Division(s): Ajmer

Services
Preceding station	Indian Railways	Following station
Swarupganj towards ?	North Western Railway zone Ahmedabad–Jaipur line	Kivarli towards ?
Location
- Interactive map

Bhimana railway station is a railway station in located on Ahmedabad–Jaipur railway line operated by the North Western Railway under Ajmer railway division. It is situated at Abu Road, Bhimana in Sirohi district in the Indian state of Rajasthan.
