= Kharwa railway station =

Railway station in Rajasthan, India

Kharwa

General information
- Location: Kharwa, Ajmer district, Rajasthan; India
- Coordinates: 26°12′16″N 74°25′36″E
- Elevation: 440 metres (1,440 ft)
- System: Indian Railways station
- Owner: Indian Railways
- Operator: North Western Railway
- Line: Ahmedabad–Jaipur line
- Platforms: 2
- Tracks: Double Electric-Line

Construction
- Structure type: Standard (on ground)

Other information
- Status: Functioning
- Station code: KRW
- Zone(s): North Western Railway zone
- Division(s): Ajmer

Services
Preceding station	Indian Railways	Following station
Lamana towards ?	North Western Railway zone Ahmedabad–Jaipur line	Piplaj towards ?
Location
- Interactive map

Kharwa railway station is a railway station in located on Ahmedabad–Jaipur railway line operated by the North Western Railway under Ajmer railway division. It is situated at Kharwa in Ajmer district in the Indian state of Rajasthan.
