= Banas railway station =

Railway station in Rajasthan, India

Banas

General information
- Location: JK Cement Factory Road, Banas, Sirohi district, Rajasthan; India
- Coordinates: 24°42′47″N 72°59′19″E
- Elevation: 347 metres (1,138 ft)
- System: Indian Railways station
- Owner: Indian Railways
- Operator: North Western Railway
- Line: Ahmedabad–Jaipur line
- Platforms: 2
- Tracks: Double Electric-Line

Construction
- Structure type: Standard (on ground)

Other information
- Status: Functioning
- Station code: BNS
- Zone(s): North Western Railway zone
- Division(s): Ajmer

Services
Preceding station	Indian Railways	Following station
Sirohi Road towards ?	North Western Railway zone Ahmedabad–Jaipur line	Swarupganj towards ?
Location
- Interactive map

Banas railway station is a railway station in located on Ahmedabad–Jaipur railway line operated by the North Western Railway under Ajmer railway division. It is situated beside JK Cement Factory Road at Banas in Sirohi district in the Indian state of Rajasthan.
