= Dhareshwar railway station =

Railway station in Rajasthan, India

Dhareshwar

General information
- Location: Dudor, Pali district, Rajasthan; India
- Coordinates: 25°46′39″N 73°40′04″E
- Elevation: 275 metres (902 ft)
- System: Indian Railways station
- Owner: Indian Railways
- Operator: North Western Railway
- Line: Ahmedabad–Jaipur line
- Platforms: 1
- Tracks: Double Electric-Line

Construction
- Structure type: Standard (on ground)

Other information
- Status: Functioning
- Station code: DRS
- Zone(s): North Western Railway zone
- Division(s): Ajmer

Services
Preceding station	Indian Railways	Following station
Bhesana towards ?	North Western Railway zone Ahmedabad–Jaipur line	Marwar Junction towards ?
Location
- Interactive map

Dhareshwar railway station is a railway station in located on Ahmedabad–Jaipur railway line operated by the North Western Railway under Ajmer railway division. It is situated at Dudor in Pali district in the Indian state of Rajasthan.
