= Jethi railway station =

Railway station in Gujarat, India

Jethi

General information
- Location: Jethi, Banaskantha district, Gujarat; India
- Coordinates: 24°17′31″N 72°30′26″E
- Elevation: 231 metres (758 ft)
- System: Indian Railways station
- Owner: Indian Railways
- Operator: North Western Railway
- Line: Ahmedabad–Jaipur line
- Platforms: 2
- Tracks: Double Electric-Line

Construction
- Structure type: Standard (on ground)

Other information
- Status: Functioning
- Station code: JTY
- Zone(s): North Western Railway zone
- Division(s): Ajmer

Services
Preceding station	Indian Railways	Following station
Iqbal Gadh towards ?	North Western Railway zone Ahmedabad–Jaipur line	Chitrasani towards ?
Location
- Interactive map

Jethi railway station is a railway station in located on Ahmedabad–Jaipur railway line operated by the North Western Railway under Ajmer railway division. It is situated at Jethi in Banaskantha district in the Indian state of Gujarat.
