= Makrera railway station =

Railway station in Rajasthan, India

Makrera

General information
- Location: Makrera, Peesangan tehsil, Ajmer district, Rajasthan; India
- Coordinates: 26°18′39″N 74°32′00″E
- Elevation: 446 metres (1,463 ft)
- System: Indian Railways station
- Owner: Indian Railways
- Operator: North Western Railway
- Line: Ahmedabad–Jaipur line
- Platforms: 1
- Tracks: Double Electric-Line

Construction
- Structure type: Standard (on ground)

Other information
- Status: Functioning
- Station code: MKRA
- Zone(s): North Western Railway zone
- Division(s): Ajmer

Services
Preceding station	Indian Railways	Following station
Saradhna towards ?	North Western Railway zone Ahmedabad–Jaipur line	Mangaliyawas towards ?
Location
- Interactive map

Makrera railway station is a railway station in located on Ahmedabad–Jaipur railway line operated by the North Western Railway under Ajmer railway division. It is situated at Makrera, Peesangan tehsil in Ajmer district in the Indian state of Rajasthan.
