= Piplaj railway station =

Railway station in Rajasthan, India

Piplaj

General information
- Location: Piplaj, Ajmer district, Rajasthan; India
- Coordinates: 26°09′53″N 74°22′39″E
- Elevation: 449 metres (1,473 ft)
- System: Indian Railways station
- Owner: Indian Railways
- Operator: North Western Railway
- Line: Ahmedabad–Jaipur line
- Platforms: 2
- Tracks: Double Electric-Line

Construction
- Structure type: Standard (on ground)

Other information
- Status: Functioning
- Station code: PPF
- Zone(s): North Western Railway zone
- Division(s): Ajmer

Services
Preceding station	Indian Railways	Following station
Kharwa towards ?	North Western Railway zone Ahmedabad–Jaipur line	Bangurgram Halt towards ?
Location
- Interactive map

Piplaj railway station is a railway station in located on Ahmedabad–Jaipur railway line operated by the North Western Railway under Ajmer railway division. It is situated at Piplaj in Ajmer district in the Indian state of Rajasthan.
