= Abu Road railway station =

Railway Station in Rajasthan, India

Abu Road
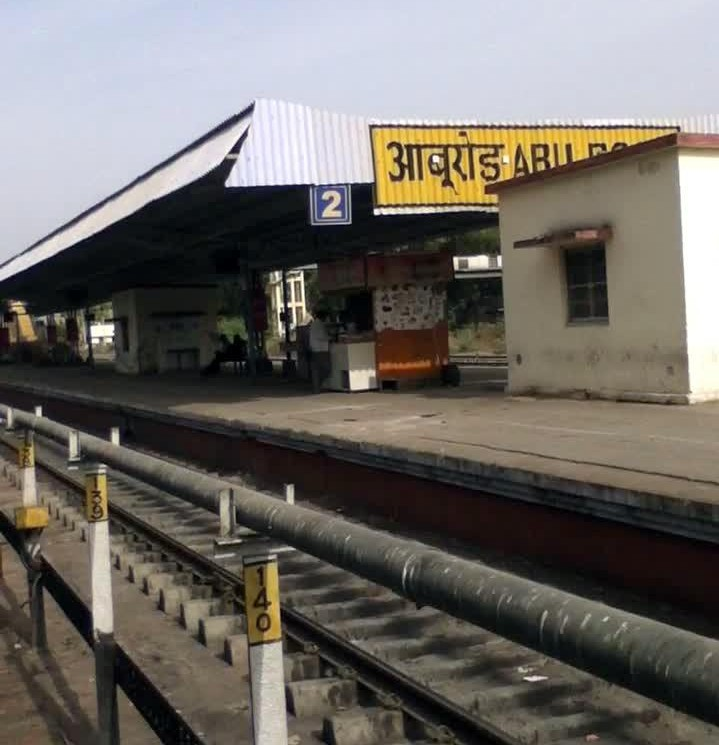
- Abu Road railway station

General information
- Location: Abu Road, Rajasthan; India
- Coordinates: 24°28′51″N 72°47′07″E
- Elevation: 262.430 metres (860.99 ft)
- System: Indian Railways
- Owner: Indian Railways
- Operator: North Western Railway
- Lines: Ahmedabad–Delhi main line Jaipur–Ahmedabad line
- Platforms: 3
- Tracks: 6

Construction
- Structure type: Standard on ground
- Parking: Yes
- Cycle facilities: No

Other information
- Status: Functioning
- Station code: ABR
- Division(s): Ajmer

History
- Opened: 1881
Location
- Location within Rajasthan

Abu Road railway station (station code: ABR) is a railway station located in Abu Road in the Indian state of Rajasthan. It serves the town of Abu Road and is a gateway to the popular hill station at Mount Abu.

== The railway station ==
Abu Road railway station is at an elevation of 262.430 metres (860.99 ft) and is assigned the code ABR.

== History ==
Rajputana State Railway opened the Delhi–Bandikui 1,000 mm (3 ft 3 3/8 in)-wide metre-gauge line in 1874, extending it to Ajmer in 1875 and to Ahmedabad in 1881. The Delhi–Ajmer metre-gauge line was converted to 5 ft 6 in (1,676 mm) broad gauge in 1994. The Ahmedabad–Ajmer sector was fully converted to broad gauge in 1997, while parts of it were converted earlier.

== Services ==
- New Delhi – Ahmedabad Swarna Jayanti Rajdhani Express
- Delhi Sarai Rohilla – Bandra Terminus Garib Rath Express
- Amrapur Aravali Express
- Ashram Express
- Haridwar Mail
- Ranakpur Express
- Suryanagri Express
- Mysore – Ajmer Express
- Dadar – Ajmer Superfast Express
- Bikaner – Dadar Superfast Express
- Chandigarh – Bandra Terminus Superfast Express
- Bandra Terminus – Jammu Tawi Vivek Express

== Diesel Loco Shed ==
The Diesel Loco Shed, Abu Road located here provides employment to a large number of people and holds an important place in town's economy. The Diesel Shed at Abu Road was commissioned by Indian Railways as a metre-gauge shed on 26 October 1966. It was then the largest MG shed of Western Railway with holdings of 112 locomotives. With broad gauge conversion, the shed was converted to a BG shed with holdings of 60 locomotives. There are 68 supervisors and 570 workers in the shed. It is the only Diesel shed in the Ajmer division and the 2nd in the North Western Railway zone of Indian Railways.

A diesel training center is located at the shed that conducts promotional, refresher and special courses for locomotive running staff as well as formal training of shed maintenance staff.

It currently houses 140+ diesel locomotives, like the WDM 3A, WDG 3A, WDG 4, WDP 4D, and the WDG 4D.

| Preceding station | Indian Railways | Following station |
|---|---|---|
| Morthala towards Marwar Junction | North Western Railway zone | Maval towards Palanpur Junction |
