= Tiloniya railway station =

Railway station in Rajasthan, India

Tiloniya

General information
- Location: Tiloniya, Ajmer district, Rajasthan; India
- Coordinates: 26°39′10″N 74°56′03″E
- Elevation: 428 metres (1,404 ft)
- System: Indian Railways station
- Owner: Indian Railways
- Operator: North Western Railway
- Line: Ahmedabad–Jaipur line
- Platforms: 2
- Tracks: Double Electric-Line

Construction
- Structure type: Standard (on ground)

Other information
- Status: Functioning
- Station code: TL
- Zone(s): North Western Railway zone
- Division(s): Jaipur

Services
Preceding station	Indian Railways	Following station
Gahlota towards ?	North Western Railway zone Ahmedabad–Jaipur line	Mandawariya towards ?
Location
- Interactive map

Tiloniya railway station is a railway station in located on Ahmedabad–Jaipur railway line operated by the North Western Railway under Jaipur railway division. It is situated at Tiloniya in Ajmer district in the Indian state of Rajasthan.
