= Marwar Ranawas railway station =

Railway Station in Rajasthan, India

General information
- Location: State Highway 61, Rajasthan; India
- Coordinates: 25.6682°N 73.7426°E
- Elevation: 310 metres (1,020 ft)
- System: Indian Railways station
- Owner: Indian Railways
- Operator: Ajmer railway division
- Line: Mavli-Marwar line (MG)
- Platforms: 1
- Tracks: 1,000 mm (3 ft 3 3/8 in) metre gauge
- Connections: Auto stand

Construction
- Structure type: Meter Gauge
- Parking: No
- Cycle facilities: No

Other information
- Status: Functioning
- Station code: MRWS
- Fare zone: North Western Railway
Location

Marwar Ranawas railway station is a small railway station in Pali district, Rajasthan. Its code is MRWS. It serves Ranawas town. The station consists of two platforms. The platforms are not well sheltered. It lacks many facilities including water and sanitation. It was converted to 1,676 mm (5 ft 6 in)-wide broad gauge in 1997.

== Major trains ==
- Mavli–Marwar MG Passenger
