= Khudala =

- neighbourhood
- Location in Rajasthan, India Khudala (India)
- Coordinates: 25.23°N 73.25°E
- Country: India
- State: Rajasthan
- District: Pali
- Talukas: Bali

Government
  - Body: Falna Municipality

Languages
  - Official: Hindi, Marwari
- Time zone: UTC+5:30 (IST)
- PIN: 306116
- Telephone code: 02938
- Vehicle registration: RJ-22
- Sex ratio: 918 ♂/♀
- Lok Sabha constituency: Pali (Lok Sabha Constituency)
- Vidhan Sabha constituency: Bali
- Civic agency: Falna Municipality
- Avg. annual temperature: 30 °C (86 °F)
- Avg. summer temperature: 44 °C (111 °F)
- Avg. winter temperature: 05 °C (41 °F)

Khudala is municipality Bali tehsil of Pali District in Rajasthan, India. It falls under the jurisdiction of the Falna Municipality. The area is known for its proximity to the town of Bali, which serves as the tehsil headquarters.

The official languages of Khudala are Hindi and Marwari. The region operates on Indian Standard Time (IST), which is UTC+5:30. The postal code for Khudala is 306116, and the area code is 02938. The vehicle registration code is RJ-22.

== Weather ==
The area experiences an average annual temperature of 30 °C (86 °F), with summer temperatures reaching up to 44 °C (111 °F) and winter temperatures dropping to around 5 °C (41 °F).

== Demographics ==
The primary languages spoken in Khudala are Hindi and Marwari. The local population is predominantly engaged in agriculture and related industries.

== Economy ==
The economy of Khudala is largely agricultural, with crops such as wheat, barley, and various pulses being cultivated in the region. The town also benefits from its proximity to Bali, which serves as a trade hub for the surrounding areas.

== Transportation ==
Khudala is well-connected by road to other major towns and cities in Pali District. The nearest railway station is located in Falna, which is approximately 15 kilometers away.

== Administration ==
Khudala falls under the jurisdiction of the Bali tehsil of Pali District. It is governed by the Falna Municipality, and its postal code is 306116.

== Education and health ==
Khudala has a number of schools and primary healthcare facilities serving the local population. The nearest hospital is located in Bali, offering more comprehensive healthcare services.

== See also ==
- Falna
