= Sakhun railway station =

Railway station in Rajasthan, India

Sakhun

General information
- Location: Sakhun, Jaipur district, Rajasthan; India
- Coordinates: 26°44′17″N 75°05′28″E
- Elevation: 393 metres (1,289 ft)
- System: Indian Railways station
- Owner: Indian Railways
- Operator: North Western Railway
- Line: Ahmedabad–Jaipur line
- Platforms: 2
- Tracks: Double Electric-Line

Construction
- Structure type: Standard (on ground)

Other information
- Status: Functioning
- Station code: SK
- Zone(s): North Western Railway zone
- Division(s): Jaipur

Services
Preceding station	Indian Railways	Following station
Dantra towards ?	North Western Railway zone Ahmedabad–Jaipur line	Sali towards ?
Location
- Interactive map

Sakhun railway station is a railway station in located on Ahmedabad–Jaipur railway line operated by the North Western Railway under Jaipur railway division. It is situated at Sakhun in Jaipur district in the Indian state of Rajasthan.
