= Kaiyal Sedhavi railway station =

Railway station in Gujarat, India

Kaiyal Sedhavi

General information
- Location: State Highway 217, Navi Sedhavi, Mehsana district, Gujarat; India
- Coordinates: 23°25′38″N 72°25′44″E
- Elevation: 85 metres (279 ft)
- System: Indian Railways station
- Owner: Indian Railways
- Operator: Western Railway
- Line: Ahmedabad–Jaipur line
- Platforms: 1
- Tracks: Double Electric-Line

Construction
- Structure type: Standard (on ground)

Other information
- Status: Functioning
- Station code: KYSD
- Zone(s): Western Railway zone
- Division(s): Ahmedabad

Services
Preceding station	Indian Railways	Following station
Ambliyasan Junction towards ?	Western Railway zone Ahmedabad–Jaipur line	Dangarwa towards ?
Location
- Interactive map

Kaiyal Sedhavi railway station is a railway station in located on Ahmedabad–Jaipur railway line operated by the Western Railway under Ahmedabad railway division. It is situated beside State Highway 217 at Navi Sedhavi in Mehsana district in the Indian state of Gujarat.
