= Bindayaka railway station =

Railway station in Rajasthan

Bindayaka

General information
- Location: Bindayaka, Jaipur, Rajasthan; India
- Coordinates: 26°55′27″N 75°39′34″E
- Elevation: 411 metres (1,348 ft)
- System: Indian Railways station
- Owner: Indian Railways
- Operator: North Western Railway
- Line: Ahmedabad–Jaipur line
- Platforms: 2
- Tracks: Double Electric-Line

Construction
- Structure type: Standard (on ground)

Other information
- Status: Functioning
- Station code: BDYK
- Zone(s): North Western Railway zone
- Division(s): Jaipur

Services
Preceding station	Indian Railways	Following station
Kanakpura towards ?	North Western Railway zone Ahmedabad–Jaipur line	Dhanakya towards ?
Location
- Interactive map

Bindayaka railway station is a railway station in located on Ahmedabad–Jaipur railway line operated by the North Western Railway under Jaipur railway division. It is situated at Bindayaka in Jaipur district in the Indian state of Rajasthan.
