= Shobhasan railway station =

Railway station in Gujarat, India

Shobhasan

General information
- Location: State Highway 41, Shobhasan, Mehsana district, Gujarat; India
- Coordinates: 23°32′32″N 72°23′39″E
- Elevation: 88 metres (289 ft)
- System: Indian Railways station
- Owner: Indian Railways
- Operator: Western Railway
- Line: Ahmedabad–Jaipur line
- Platforms: 1
- Tracks: Triple Electric-Line

Construction
- Structure type: Standard (on ground)

Other information
- Status: Functioning
- Station code: SXS
- Zone(s): Western Railway zone
- Division(s): Ahmedabad

Services
Preceding station	Indian Railways	Following station
Mahesana towards ?	Western Railway zone Ahmedabad–Jaipur line	Jagudan towards ?
Location
- Interactive map

Shobhasan railway station is a railway station in located on Ahmedabad–Jaipur railway line operated by the Western Railway under Ahmedabad railway division. It is situated beside State Highway 41 at Shobhasan in Mehsana district in the Indian state of Gujarat.
