= Dhanakya railway station =

Railway station in Rajasthan, India

Dhanakya

General information
- Location: Dhanakya Station Road, Nandgaon Barsana, Jaipur district, Rajasthan; India
- Coordinates: 26°55′05″N 75°36′20″E
- Elevation: 418 metres (1,371 ft)
- System: Indian Railways station
- Owner: Indian Railways
- Operator: North Western Railway
- Line: Ahmedabad–Jaipur line
- Platforms: 2
- Tracks: Double Electric-Line

Construction
- Structure type: Standard (on ground)

Other information
- Status: Functioning
- Station code: DNK
- Zone(s): North Western Railway zone
- Division(s): Jaipur

Services
Preceding station	Indian Railways	Following station
Bindayaka towards ?	North Western Railway zone Ahmedabad–Jaipur line	Sheo Singh Pura towards ?
Location
- Interactive map

Dhanakya railway station is a railway station in located on Ahmedabad–Jaipur railway line operated by the North Western Railway under Jaipur railway division. It is situated beside Dhanakya Station Road at Nandgaon Barsanaat in Jaipur district in the Indian state of Rajasthan.
