= Gahlota railway station =

Railway station in Rajasthan, India

Gahlota

General information
- Location: Kishangarh, Ajmer district, Rajasthan; India
- Coordinates: 26°40′21″N 74°58′03″E
- Elevation: 417 metres (1,368 ft)
- System: Indian Railways station
- Owner: Indian Railways
- Operator: North Western Railway
- Line: Ahmedabad–Jaipur line
- Platforms: 1
- Tracks: Double Electric-Line

Construction
- Structure type: Standard (on ground)

Other information
- Status: Functioning
- Station code: GLTA
- Zone(s): North Western Railway zone
- Division(s): Jaipur

Services
Preceding station	Indian Railways	Following station
Sali towards ?	North Western Railway zone Ahmedabad–Jaipur line	Tiloniya towards ?
Location
- Interactive map

Gahlota railway station is a railway station in located on Ahmedabad–Jaipur railway line operated by the North Western Railway under Jaipur railway division. It is situated at Kishangarh in Ajmer district in the Indian state of Rajasthan.
