= Sheo Singh Pura railway station =

Railway station in Rajasthan, India

Sheo Singh Pura

General information
- Location: Kanarpura, Khanga Ki Dhani, Jaipur district, Rajasthan; India
- Coordinates: 26°54′48″N 75°34′02″E
- Elevation: 409 metres (1,342 ft)
- System: Indian Railways station
- Owner: Indian Railways
- Operator: North Western Railway
- Line: Ahmedabad–Jaipur line
- Platforms: 2
- Tracks: Double Electric-Line

Construction
- Structure type: Standard (on ground)

Other information
- Status: Functioning
- Station code: SHNX
- Zone(s): North Western Railway zone
- Division(s): Jaipur

Services
Preceding station	Indian Railways	Following station
Dhanakya towards ?	North Western Railway zone Ahmedabad–Jaipur line	Bobas towards ?
Location
- Interactive map

Sheo Singh Pura railway station is a railway station in located on Ahmedabad–Jaipur railway line operated by the North Western Railway under Jaipur railway division. It is situated at Kanarpura, Khanga Ki Dhani in Jaipur district in the Indian state of Rajasthan.
