= Khimel =

Village in Rajasthan, India

Khimel is a village of Bali Tehsil in Pali District of Rajasthan, India. It belongs to Jodhpur Division. Khimel is located 60 km towards South from District headquarters Pali. 22 km from Bali. 362 km from State capital Jaipur.

Historically, the village is quite ancient. According to the inscriptions of in the Śvetāmbara Jain temple (fifty-two jinalayas), its ancient name was Sinhavalli. This village is more ancient than 11th century, based on a Śvetāmbara scripture Jain Tirtha Sarve Sangraksha.

== Demographics ==
According to Census 2011, Khimel has a population of 4,272, where male are 2000 and female are 2,272.

== Transport ==
Khimel railway station is situated in Ahmedabad–Jaipur line under Ajmer railway division.

== Places of interest ==
=== Temples ===
The Śvetāmbara Jain temple is one of the major attraction of Khimel. This temple was built in 1077 (1134 V.S.). The main deity of this temple is a white-colored 75-cm-tall statue of Shantinatha. This idol was consecrated by Acharya Shri Hemsurishwarji. There are Shree Panchmukhi Hanuman Ji Temple with 84 phare, Mata Temple, Lord Shiva Temple.
