= Dare (Satara) =

Village in Maharashtra

- village
- Location in Maharashtra, India Dare (India)
- Coordinates: 17.77°N 74.08°E
- Country: India
- State: Maharashtra
- District: Satara district

Languages
  - Official: Marathi
- Time zone: UTC+5:30 (IST)
- PIN: 415020
- Nearest city: Jawali taluka

Dare is a village in the Jawali taluka of Satara district in Maharashtra, India.
