= Bali, Rajasthan =

Bali
- Town
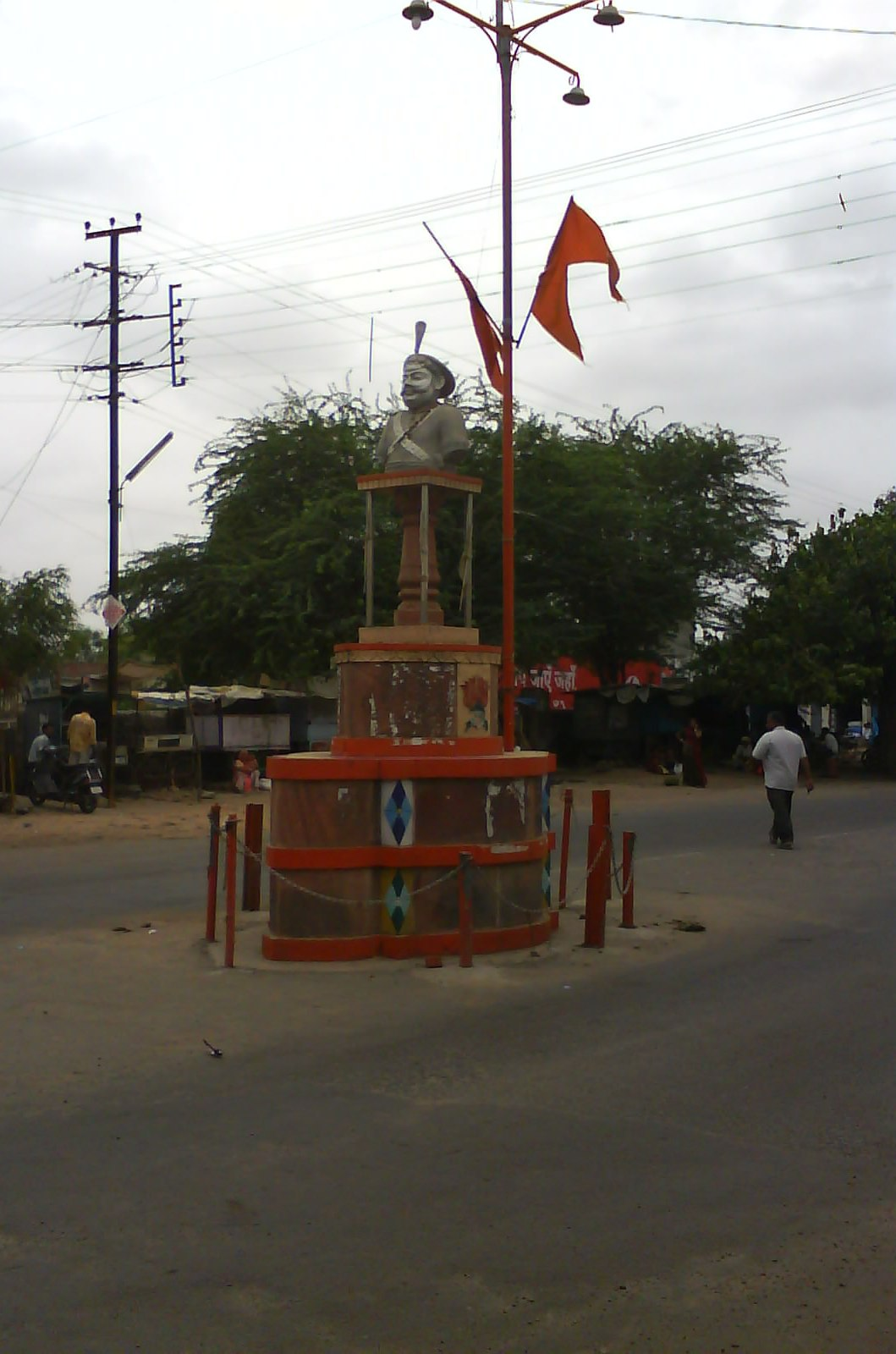
- Prithviraj Chauhan Chauk

- Location in Rajasthan, India Bali (India)
- Coordinates: 25.18°N 73.28°E
- Country: India
- State: Rajasthan
- District: Pali
- Established: 1231 AD
- Founder: maharao balaji balecha chouhan
- Named for: maharao balaji balecha chouhan

Government
  - Type: Municipal corporation
  - Body: Nagar Palika
- Elevation: 298 m (978 ft)

Population (2011)
  - Total: 19,880

Languages
  - Official: Godwari dialect (part of Marwari Language)
- Time zone: UTC+5:30 (IST)
- PIN: 306701
- Telephone code: 02938
- ISO 3166 code: RJ-IN
- Vehicle registration: RJ-22
- Sex ratio: 987 ♂/♀

SDM - DINESH BISHNOI

Bali is a town and a municipality in Pali district in the Indian state of Rajasthan, on the left bank of the Mithari River.

== Geography ==
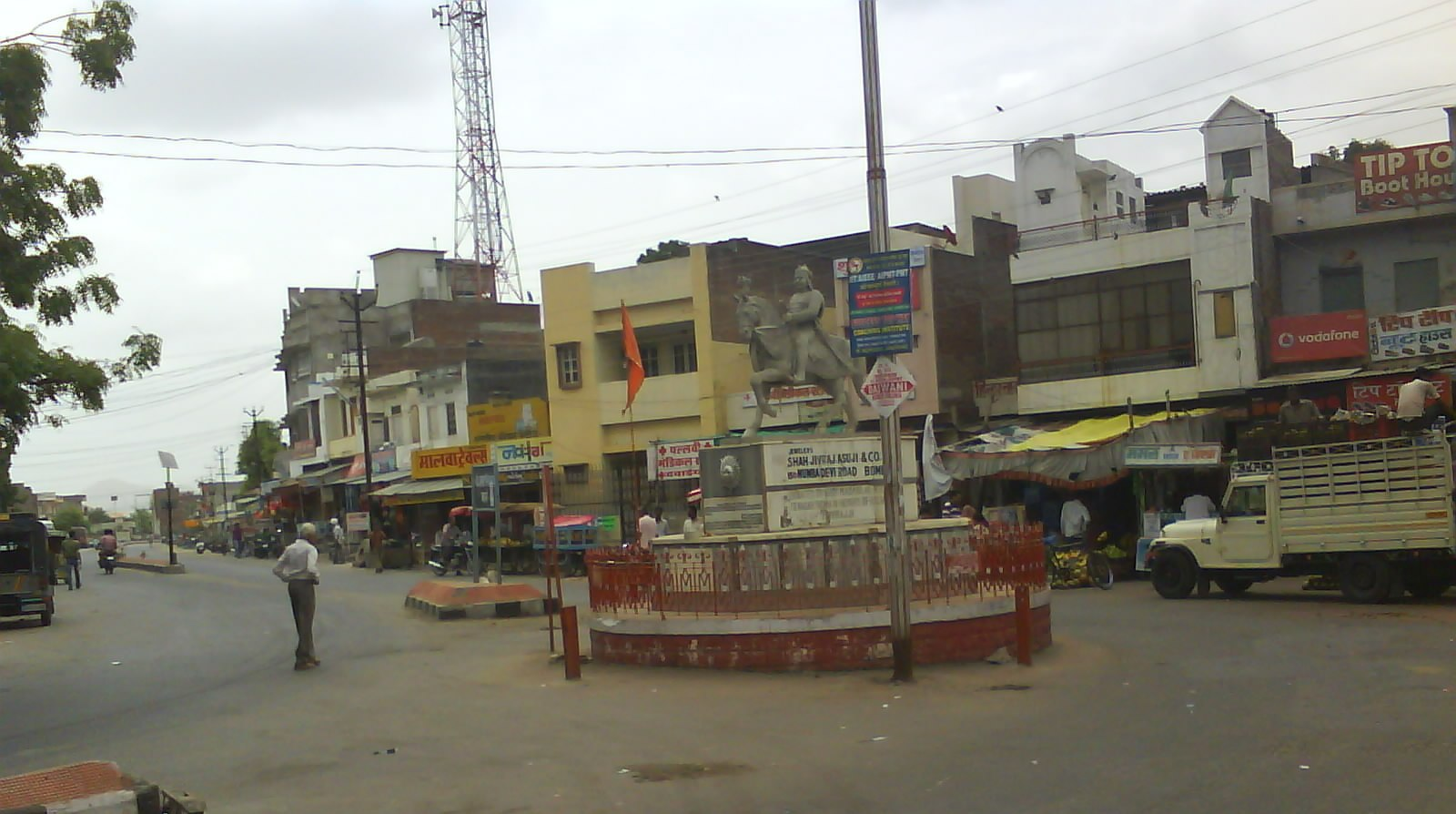
Maharana Pratap Chouk Bali

Bali is located at 25.18°N 73.28°E near the Aravalli Range. It is a constituency of Pali district. It has an average elevation of 298 metres (977 feet). In the easts 7 km from Bali. The nearest airport is Udaipur.

== Administration ==
Bali is represented nationally by the Pali constituency, and at the state level by the Bali constituency. There are 25 wards in the municipality.

== Demographics ==
As of 2011 India census, Bali had a population of 19,880. Males constitute 50.67% (10,007) of the population and females 49.33% (9,873). Bali has an average literacy rate of 64.28%, lower than the national average of 74.04%; with 74.51% of the males and 53.91% of females literate. 11.72% of the population is under 6 years of age. In 1897 its population was about 6000. The majority of population of Bali consists of Jain and Marwadi community, which is also the most prosperous community. However most members of this community have settled elsewhere in India, where they carry out business and visit their ancestral town mostly to perform marriages in the family.

The Bali Assembly constituency is one of the six Rajasthan Legislative Assembly constituencies in Pali district. In the past, it has also elected the former Chief Minister Bhairon Singh Shekhawat as their MLA in 1993 and 1998.

Demographic distribution of religions in Bali
| Hinduism | 82% |
| islam | 13% |
| Jainism | 3.7% |
| Others♦ | 1.3% |
♦Includes 0.4% Christians and 0.2% Sikhs

Population growth through the years
| Year | Population |
|---|---|
| 2014 | 35,000 |

== As a tehsil ==
Bali tehsil has 93 villages under 39 gram panchayats and two municipalities, Falna and itself. Gram Panchayats are Amaliya, Barwa, Bedal, Bera, Bhandar, Bhatund, Bheetwara, Bhimana, Bijapur, shri sela, Bisalpur, Boya, Chamunderi, Dhani-Shri Sela, Doodni, Falna Gaon, Goriya, Guralas, Kakardi, Khimel, Kotbaliyan, Kothar, Koyalwao, Kumtiya, sandla, Kuran, Latara, Lunawa, Lundara, Malnoo, Mirgeshwar, Mokampura, Mundara, Nana, Paderla, Peepla, Perwa, Sena, Sesli, Sewari and Shivtalao. The tehsil has an area of about 1304.26 square kilometres.

Population of the tehsil is 2,23,027 (2001 census). Out of which 1,83,802 is rural while 39,225 is urban. Male constitutes 1,11,572 and female population is 1,11,455.

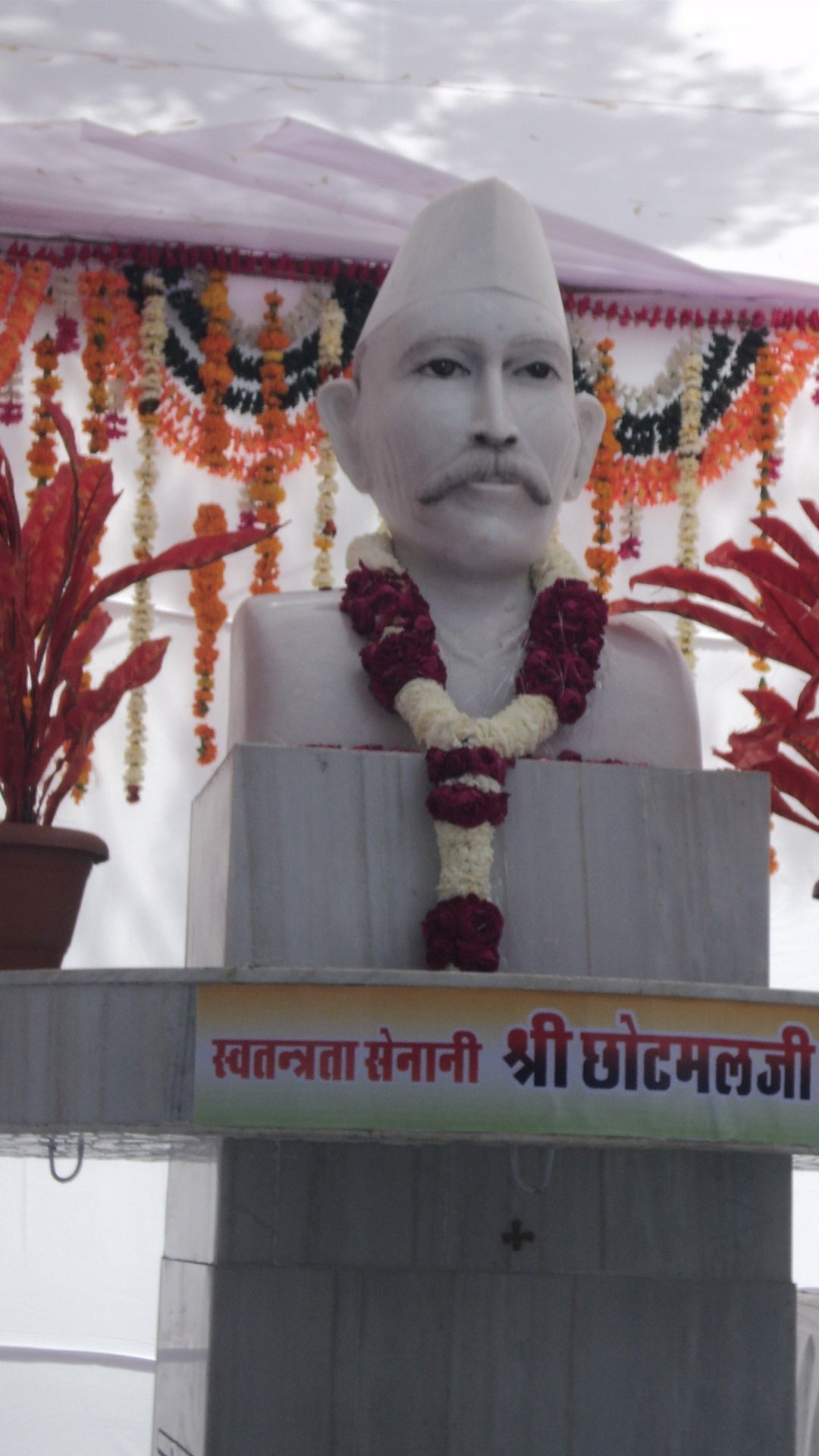
Chotmal Suraana Chowk
