= Ashram Express =

Train in India

Ashram Superfast Express

Overview
- Service type: Superfast Express
- Locale: Gujarat, Rajasthan, Haryana & Delhi
- First service: 1 April 1983; 43 years ago
- Current operator: Western Railway

Route
- Termini: Sabarmati (SBIB); Old Delhi (DLI)
- Stops: 18
- Distance travelled: 929.2 km (577 mi)
- Average journey time: 14 hours 45 minutes
- Service frequency: Daily

On-board services
- Classes: AC First Class, AC 2 Tier, AC 3 Tier, Sleeper Class, General Unreserved
- Seating arrangements: Yes
- Sleeping arrangements: Yes
- Catering facilities: On-board catering, E-catering
- Observation facilities: Large windows
- Entertainment facilities: Railink Wi-Fi
- Baggage facilities: Available
- Other facilities: Below the seats

Technical
- Rolling stock: LHB coach
- Track gauge: 1,676 mm (5 ft 6 in)
- Operating speed: 130 km/h (81 mph) maximum, 62.99 km/h (39.14 mph) average including halts.

The 12915 / 12916 Ashram Superfast Express is a Superfast Express train that runs between Sabarmati B.G In Gujarat and Old Delhi Junction in Delhi India. It is a daily service. It operates as train number 12915 from Sabarmati to Old Delhi and as train number 12916 in the reverse direction. It also gets 2nd Highest Priority in its route after Rajdhani Express.

== History ==
When introduced in 1983, Delhi Junction–Ahmedabad Junction Mainline was a Meter Gauge Line. Ashram Express ran as the 505-MG / 506-MG Ashram Express. This was the 2nd fastest train in the Meter Gauge Delhi Junction–Ahmedabad Junction Mainline. Since 1997, this train runs on Broad Gauge Delhi Junction–Ahmedabad Junction Mainline after Gauge Conversion. Timings in MG era were:- for 505-MG Delhi Junction 13.30; Jaipur Junction 19.40 pm; Ajmer Junction 22.25 pm; Marwar Junction 01.22 am; Abu Road 04.45 am; Ahmedabad Junction 08.40 am and for 506-MG Ahmedabad Junction 14.00 pm; Abu Road 18.05 pm; Marwar Junction 21.25 pm; Ajmer Junction 00.40 am; Jaipur Junction 03.25 am; Delhi Junction 09.10 am. It used to cover the distance in 19 hrs 10 mins running at 48.50 km/h (30.14 mph).

== Name ==
The train is named after the Sabarmati Ashram in Ahmedabad, which was one of the residences of Mahatma Gandhi.

== Coach composition ==
The 12915 / 12916 Ashram Express presently has 1 AC 1st Class, 1 AC 1st Class cum AC 2 tier, 1 AC 2 tier, 5 AC 3 tier, 7 Sleeper class, 2 General Unreserved & 2 EoG cum Luggage coaches, from which (1–40) seats of 1st general bogie are reserved for ladies and (41–50) seats are for person with disabilities. As with most train services in India, coach composition may be amended at the discretion of Indian Railways depending on demand.

== Current service ==
The 12915 Ashram Express covers the distance of 929.2 km (577.4 mi) in 14 hours 45 mins & 929.2 km (577.4 mi) in 14 hours 45 mins as 12916 Ashram Express.

As its average speed in both directions is above 55 km/h (34 mph) and maximum 60 km/h (37 mph), as per Indian Railways rules, its fare has a Superfast surcharge. In addition, it gets priority over local (commuter) trains, standard express, passenger trains and most freight trains. Nowadays, this train is 6th fastest train from Delhi to Ahmedabad City, after Rajdhani's and Sampark Kranti express, though GaribRath express is more slow than this train.

The Western Railway announced that the terminal station for the Ashram Express train, from 1 February 2024 would be Sabarmati station and it will not proceed to Ahmedabad Junction in Kalupur due to works of modernization & privatization of Ahmedabad Junction. Earlier, from 2003, the train had a two minute stop at Sabarmati.

== Route and halts ==
The train runs from Sabarmati via Mahesana Junction, Palanpur Junction, Abu Road, Falna, Beawar, Ajmer Junction, Jaipur Junction, Dausa, Bandikui Junction, Alwar, Khairthal, Rewari, Gurgaon, Delhi Cantonment to Old Delhi. In MG era, there was stop at Marwar Junction which was removed after BG era started.

== Traction ==
The route is now fully electrified, it is hauled by a Vadodara Loco Shed or Bhagat Ki Kothi Loco Shed-based WAP-7 electric locomotive on its entire journey.

== Time-table ==
- 12915 Ashram Express leaves Sabarmati B.G every day at 19:45 hrs IST and reaches Old Delhi at 10:30 hrs IST the next day.
- 12916 Ashram Express leaves Old Delhi every day at 15:10 hrs IST and reaches Sabarmati B.G at 05:55 am hrs IST the next day.

== Rake sharing ==
No more rake sharing. It was rake sharing with 22995/22996 Mandore Express.

== See also ==
- Mandore Express
- Indian Railways
