= Dangarwa railway station =

Railway station in Gujarat, India

Dangarwa

General information
- Location: Dangarwa, Mehsana district, Gujarat; India
- Coordinates: 23°22′52″N 72°26′56″E
- Elevation: 82 metres (269 ft)
- System: Indian Railways station
- Owner: Indian Railways
- Operator: Western Railway
- Line: Ahmedabad–Jaipur line
- Platforms: 2
- Tracks: Double Electric-Line

Construction
- Structure type: Standard (on ground)

Other information
- Status: Functioning
- Station code: DNW
- Zone(s): Western Railway zone
- Division(s): Ahmedabad

Services
Preceding station	Indian Railways	Following station
Kaiyal Sedhavi towards ?	Western Railway zone Ahmedabad–Jaipur line	Ghumasan Bg towards ?
Location
- Interactive map

Dangarwa railway station is a railway station in located on Ahmedabad–Jaipur railway line operated by the Western Railway under Ahmedabad railway division. It is situated at Dangarwa in Mehsana district in the Indian state of Gujarat.
