= Bobas railway station =

Railway station in Rajasthan, India

Bobas

General information
- Location: Sardarpura, Dhakawala, Jaipur district, Rajasthan; India
- Coordinates: 26°54′21″N 75°29′55″E
- Elevation: 394 metres (1,293 ft)
- System: Indian Railways station
- Owner: Indian Railways
- Operator: North Western Railway
- Line: Ahmedabad–Jaipur line
- Platforms: 2
- Tracks: Double Electric-Line

Construction
- Structure type: Standard (on ground)

Other information
- Status: Functioning
- Station code: BOBS
- Zone(s): North Western Railway zone
- Division(s): Jaipur

Services
Preceding station	Indian Railways	Following station
Sheo Singh Pura towards ?	North Western Railway zone Ahmedabad–Jaipur line	Asalpur Jobner towards ?
Location
- Interactive map

Bobas railway station is a railway station in located on Ahmedabad–Jaipur railway line operated by the North Western Railway under Jaipur railway division. It is situated at Sardarpura, Dhakawala in Jaipur district in the Indian state of Rajasthan.
