= Mandawariya railway station =

Railway station in Rajasthan, India

Mandawariya

General information
- Location: Harmara Road, Mandawariya, Ajmer district, Rajasthan; India
- Coordinates: 26°37′16″N 74°53′26″E
- Elevation: 446 metres (1,463 ft)
- System: Indian Railways station
- Owner: Indian Railways
- Operator: North Western Railway
- Line: Ahmedabad–Jaipur line
- Platforms: 1
- Tracks: Double Electric-Line

Construction
- Structure type: Standard (on ground)

Other information
- Status: Functioning
- Station code: MNDV
- Zone(s): North Western Railway zone
- Division(s): Jaipur

Services
Preceding station	Indian Railways	Following station
Tiloniya towards ?	North Western Railway zone Ahmedabad–Jaipur line	Kishangarh towards ?
Location
- Interactive map

Mandawariya railway station is a railway station in located on Ahmedabad–Jaipur railway line operated by the North Western Railway under Jaipur railway division. It is situated beside Harmara Road at Mandawariya in Ajmer district in the Indian state of Rajasthan.
