= Barawal, India =

Village in Rajasthan, India

Barawal is a small village in the Bali Tehsil in the Pali district of the Indian state of Rajasthan.
