= Jagudan railway station =

Railway station in Gujarat, India

Jagudan

General information
- Location: Kochva Road, Jagudan, Mehsana district, Gujarat; India
- Coordinates: 23°31′19″N 72°24′06″E
- Elevation: 89 metres (292 ft)
- System: Indian Railways station
- Owner: Indian Railways
- Operator: Western Railway
- Line: Ahmedabad–Jaipur line
- Platforms: 3
- Tracks: Triple Electric-Line

Construction
- Structure type: Standard (on ground)

Other information
- Status: Functioning
- Station code: JDN
- Zone(s): Western Railway zone
- Division(s): Ahmedabad

Services
Preceding station	Indian Railways	Following station
Shobhasan towards ?	Western Railway zone Ahmedabad–Jaipur line	Ambliyasan Junction towards ?
Location
- Interactive map

Jagudan railway station is a railway station in located on Ahmedabad–Jaipur railway line operated by the Western Railway under Ahmedabad railway division. It is situated beside Kochva Road at Jagudan in Mehsana district in the Indian state of Gujarat.
