= Kushal Singh of Auwa =

Indian rebel (died 1864)

Kushal Singh Champawat
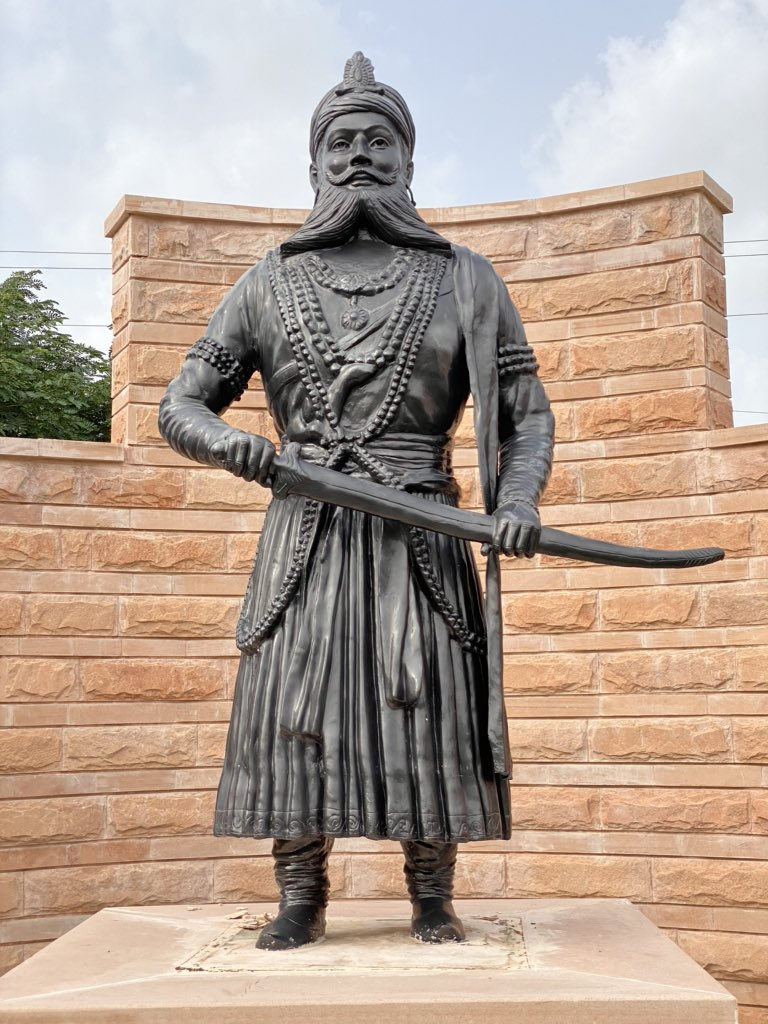
- Statue of Thakur Kushal Singh in Auwa
- Born: Auwa, Jodhpur State
- Died: 1864; Mewar
- Movement: Indian rebellion of 1857

Kushal Singh Rathore, also known as Kushal Singh Champawat, (died 1864) was the Thakur of a prominent Thikana of Auwa in Jodhpur State. During the Indian rebellion of 1857, he defeated the British army in the Battle of Bithoda and Chelawas.

== Role in Indian Rebellion of 1857 ==
Kushal Singh, who was in open rebellion, invited the rebel soldiers of Jodhpur region to Auwa who were marching from Mount Abu to Delhi. The Thakurs of Asop, Bajawas, Gular and Alaniawas also joined Thakur Kushal Singh at Auwa to put combined effort. The Agent of Governor General of Rajputana General Lawrence when hearing of the news of the rebellion asked Maharaja of Jodhpur to collect an army and march towards Auwa. The Jodhpur state army half-heartedly marched, furious General Lawrence sent Lt. Heathcote to encourage the men to attack Auwa.

== Battle of Bithoda ==
Kushaal Singh at the head of the rebel army marched to meet the state army near Bithoda, where a battle ensued and the state army fled along with Lt. Heathcote. The Auwa army became victorious.

== Battle of Chelawas ==
Highly disappointed General Lawrence personally marched from Nasirabad to subdue Kushal Singh, Jodhpur Political Agent Captain Monck Mason also joined him from Jodhpur with his army. Combined army led of Lawrence and Mason laid siege to Auwa fort.

The besieged sallied from the fort and a battle ensued near Chelawas where Captain Monck Mason was killed and later his head was hanged at the gate of Fort of Auwa. General Lawrence, being defeated, retreated and fell back to Nasirabad.

== Rebels Marched Towards Delhi ==
In October 1857 men of Jodhpur Legion departed from Auwa and went towards Delhi. The thakurs of Gular, Asop and Alaniawas also marched towards Delhi along with the rebels of Jodhpur legion.

== Siege of Auwa ==
Thakur Kushal Singh's strength got weakened after their departure. Governor-General sent an expeditionary force of 30,000 men under Brigadier Holmes which attacked and occupied Auwa after 5 days siege. Thakur Kushal Singh escaped with his men but the fort was destroyed and his Jagir confiscated along with Jagirs of the various chiefs who allied with him.

== Later life ==
After his escape from Auwa, he took shelter at Kotharia in neighbouring State. He was provided with monthly allowance of a thousand rupees by Maharana of Mewar. On 8 August 1860, he surrendered himself in front of britisher at Neemuch Cantonment nearby area of Mewar.

== Legacy ==
A Panorama cum museum was built and inaugurated by Vasundhara Raje, the Chief Minister of Rajasthan in 2018 at Auwa showcasing history of Rebellion of 1857 and Rajasthan's role in it. The Panorama also includes a statue of Kushal Singh and a small temple of Sugali Mata, the Chief deity of Auwa thakur. The original idol was broken and taken to Ajmer after the sack of Auwa in 1857.
