= Mundara =

- village
- Location in Rajasthan, India Mundara (India)
- Coordinates: 25.2°N 73.3833°E
- Country: India
- State: Rajasthan
- District: Pali, Rajasthan
- Elevation: 334 m (1,096 ft)

Population (2001)
  - Total: 7,737

Languages
  - Official: Hindi
- Time zone: UTC+5:30 (IST)
- PIN: 306705
- Telephone code: 02938
- ISO 3166 code: RJ-IN
- Vehicle registration: RJ-57
- Sex ratio: 1061 ♂/♀

Mundara is a village located in the Bali tehsil of Pali district of Rajasthan state. Before it was formally founded, other were various settlement in the area which fell under the Jagir of the Rajput Clan KARNOT RATHORE who still reside in the central part of the village at a location called KARNOT RAWLA.

== Demographics ==
Mundara village has lower literacy rate compared to Rajasthan. In 2011, literacy rate of Mundara village was 63.31% compared to 66.11% of Rajasthan. In Mundara Male literacy stands at 75.83% while female literacy rate was 52.47%.
