= Swarupganj =

Swarupganj (Swaroopganj)
- Village
- Location in Rajasthan, India Swarupganj (Swaroopganj) (India)
- Coordinates: 24°39′34″N 72°55′47″E
- Country: India
- State: Rajasthan
- District: Sirohi
- Tehsil: Pindwara
- Elevation: 334 m (1,096 ft)

Languages
  - Official: Hindi
- Time zone: UTC+5:30 (IST)
- Postal code: 307023
- Telephone code: 91-2971
- Vehicle registration: RJ-24/38

Swarupganj (Swaroopganj) is a village in Sirohi district in Rajasthan state in India. It is located about 45 km south of Sirohi and 20 km north of Abu Road. Swarupganj railway station is situated on Ahmedabad-Jaipur rail route.
