= Nana, Rajasthan =

Nana Virampura
- village
- Nickname: Nona
- Location in Rajasthan, India Nana (India)
- Coordinates: 24.916°N 73.133°E
- Country: India
- State: Rajasthan
- District: Pali
- Talukas: Bali, India

Government
  - Body: Gram Panchayat
- Elevation: 362 m (1,188 ft)

Population (2001)
  - Total: 10,298

Languages
  - Official: Hindi, Marwari
- Time zone: UTC+5:30 (IST)
- PIN: 306504
- Telephone code: 02933
- ISO 3166 code: RJ-IN
- Vehicle registration: RJ-22
- Sex ratio: 975 ♂/♀
- Lok Sabha constituency: Pali (Lok Sabha Constituency)
- Vidhan Sabha constituency: Bali, India
- Civic agency: Gram Panchayat
- Avg. annual temperature: 30 °C (86 °F)
- Avg. summer temperature: 44 °C (111 °F)
- Avg. winter temperature: 05 °C (41 °F)

Nana is a village in the Bali, tehsil of Pali District of the Rajasthan state in India. Nana just became sub-block division declared. Nana police station is also located at railway station just two km from town.

== Transport ==
Nana railway station is situated on the Ahmedabad-Ajmer railway line. Pindwada-Bali road is passing nearby Nana. Virampura is close to Nana just one km. Nearby city is Pindwara 20 km, Sumerpur 40 km, Sheoganj 40 km, Shirohi 42 km, Aburoad 70 km from Nana. Nearest airport is Udaipur 120 km away and Jodhpurs is 200 km. District headquarter Pali is 100 km from Nana.

== Demographics ==
Nana had a population of 12,298 according to the Census 2001. Males were 6288 of the population and females were 6010.
