= Mandore Express =

Train in India

Overview
- Service type: Superfast
- Locale: Delhi, Haryana & Rajasthan
- First service: 2 April 1983; 43 years ago
- Current operator: Western Railway

Route
- Termini: Old Delhi (DLI); Jodhpur (JU)
- Stops: 16
- Distance travelled: 619 km (385 mi)
- Average journey time: 10 hours 40 minutes
- Service frequency: Daily
- Train number: 22995 / 22996

On-board services
- Classes: AC First Class, AC 2 Tier, AC 3 Tier, Sleeper Class, General Unreserved
- Seating arrangements: Yes
- Sleeping arrangements: Yes
- Catering facilities: On-board catering, E-catering
- Observation facilities: Large windows
- Baggage facilities: Available
- Other facilities: Below the seats

Technical
- Rolling stock: Amrit Bharat rake (TBD)
- Track gauge: 1,676 mm (5 ft 6 in)
- Operating speed: 58 km/h (36 mph) average including halts.

The 22995 / 22996 Mandore Express is a superfast express train connecting Jodhpur in Rajasthan and Old Delhi in Delhi. It has distance of approximately 619 km. The train runs on Indian Railways broad-gauge line. The train is named after the historic town of Mandore, which is located near Jodhpur.

Total travel time is 10 hrs and 40 mins and the distance is 619 km on an avg speed of 58 km/h (36 mph) having max permissible speed of 130 km/h (81 mph) between Old Delhi and Jaipur Junction.

== History ==
When introduced in 1983, the train used to run on Meter Gauge Delhi Junction–Ahmedabad Junction Mainline between Old Delhi & Phulera Junction and Meter Gauge Phulera Junction - Jodhpur branch line. Covering the distance in 13 hrs 00 mins running at 47.55 km/h (30 mph) and was the 3rd fastest train in the route. The train used to share rake with the MG Suryanagri Express in MG era. This was changed in BG era & now Ashram Express shares rake with this train.

== Importance ==
In 1986, on a trip back from Jaipur to Delhi, both esteemed film directors Satyajit Ray & Subhash Ghai travelled together in this very train. Subhash Ghai was travelling to Dehradun to visit another legend, writer & novelist Ruskin Bond after finishing a movie shoot in Jaipur. Satyajit Ray was going back to Kolkata (then Calcutta) after meeting with Jaipur Royal Family as their guest.

== Rake sharing ==
No more rake sharing. It was sharing rake with 12915/12916 Ashram Express.

== Route & Halts ==
The train runs from Old Delhi via Delhi Cantonment, Palam, Gurgaon, Rewari, Alwar, Bandikui Junction, Dausa, Jaipur Junction, Phulera Junction, Kuchaman City, Makrana Junction, Degana Junction, Merta Road Junction, Gotan to Jodhpur.

== Traction ==
It is hauled by a Bhagat Ki Kothi Loco Shed-based WDP-4 / WDP-4B / WDP-4D diesel locomotive on its entire journey. Now it is hauled by a Bhagat Ki Kothi Loco Shed based WAP-7 electric locomotive.

== See also ==
- Indian Railways
