= Bagrinagar =

- village
- Location in Rajasthan, India
- Coordinates: 25.90°N 73.80°E
- Country: India
- State: Rajasthan
- District: Pali
- Talukas: Sojat

Government
  - Type: Sarpanch Bhundaram Choudhary
  - Body: Bagrinagar Gram Panchayat
- Elevation: 285 m (935 ft)

Population (2011)
  - Total: 10,509

Languages
  - Official: Hindi, Marwari
- Time zone: UTC+5:30 (IST)
- PIN: 306114
- Telephone code: 02960
- ISO 3166 code: RJ-IN
- Vehicle registration: RJ-22
- Sex ratio: 1,055 ♂/♀
- Vidhan Sabha constituency: Sojat
- Civic agency: Bagrinagar Gram Panchayat

Bagrinagar or Bagri is a village and gram Panchayat in Sojat tehsil of Pali district of Rajasthan state in India.

There is one district level District Institute of Education and Training (DIET) in the village which conducts the 8th Board exam in the district.

== Geography ==
Geographic location of Bagri is 25.8954N, 73.8064E. It is located at a distance of 7 km from Sojat Road town which is on state highway 62 of Rajasthan.

== Demographics ==
As per 2011 Census of India Bagri had a total population of 10,509 of which 5,115 (49%) were males and 5,394 (51%) were females. Population below 6 years was 1,257. The literacy rate was 64.73% of the population over 6 years. The sex ratio was 1,055 females per thousand males.

== Transportation ==
Bagri Nagar railway station on Marwar Junction-Ajmer line is located just west of Bagri village.
