= Marwar Junction railway station =

Railway Station in Rajasthan, India

Marwar Junction
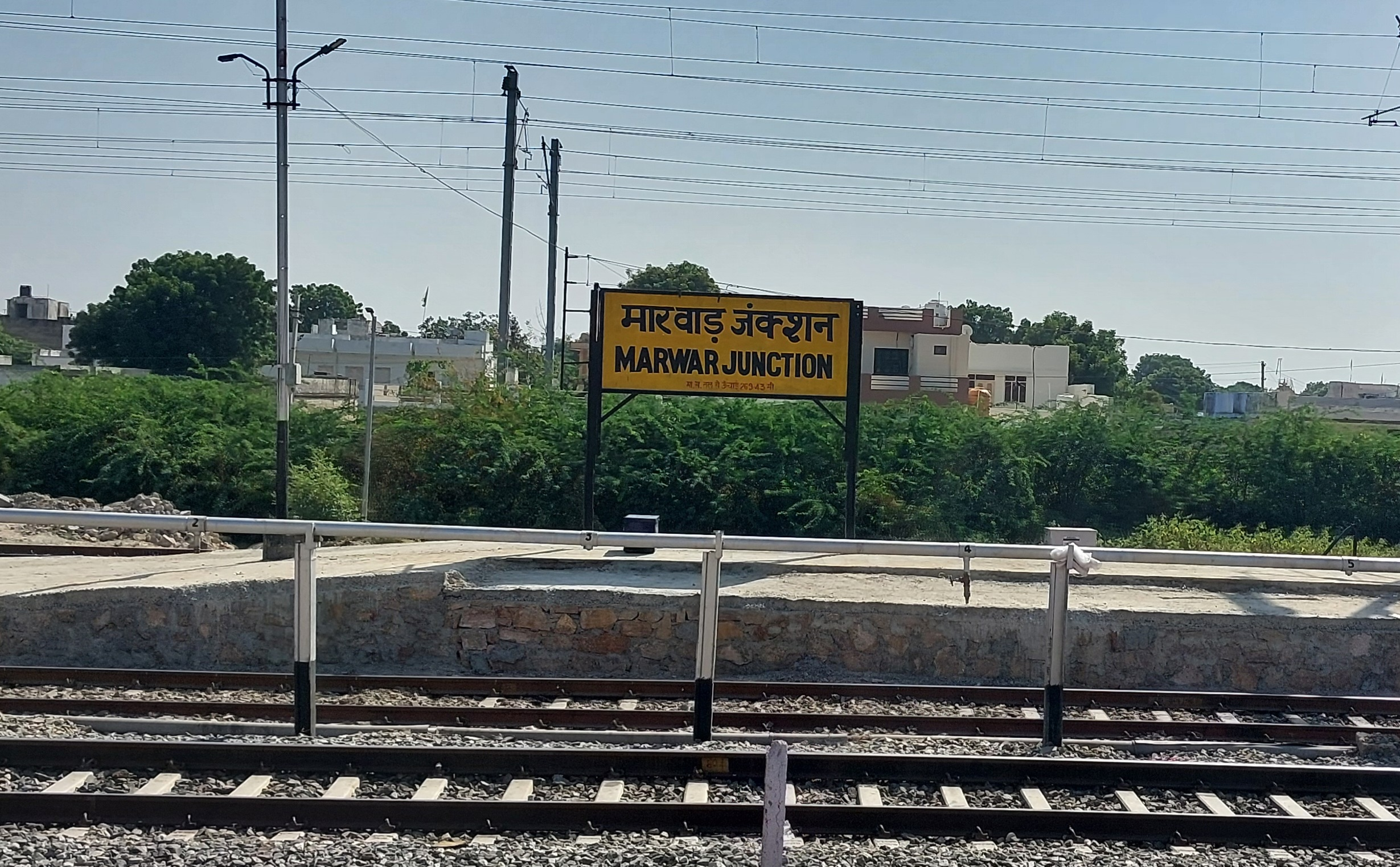
- hMarwar railway station platform

General information
- Location: State Highway 61, Marwar Junction, Rajasthan; India
- Coordinates: 25°43′14″N 73°36′33″E
- Elevation: 267 metres (876 ft)
- System: Indian Railways junction station
- Owner: Indian Railways
- Operator: North Western Railway
- Lines: New Delhi–Ahmedabad main line, Jaipur–Ahmedabad line, Marwar Junction–Munabao line, Mavli–Marwar line
- Platforms: 4 (3 broad gauge + 1 meter gauge)
- Tracks: 1,676 mm (5 ft 6 in) and 1,000 mm (3 ft 3 3/8 in) metre gauge

Construction
- Structure type: Standard on ground
- Parking: Yes
- Cycle facilities: No

Other information
- Status: Functioning
- Station code: MJ
- Division(s): Ajmer

History
- Opened: 1881
Location
- Location within Rajasthan

Marwar Junction railway station (station code MJ) is located in Pali district in the Indian state of Rajasthan. It serves the census town at Marwar Junction.

== The railway station ==
Marwar Junction railway station is at an elevation of 267 metres (876 ft) and was assigned the code – MJ.

== History ==
Rajputana State Railway extended the Delhi–Ajmer 1,000 mm (3 ft 3 3/8 in)-wide metre-gauge line to Ahmeabad in 1881. It was converted to 5 ft 6 in (1,676 mm) broad gauge in 1997.

The Rajputana–Malwa Railway built the metre-gauge line from Marwar Junction to Pali in 1882. Later, this section was extended to Jodhpur and formed the Jodhpur Railway. The line now runs up to Munabao on the India–Pakistan border and has been fully converted to broad gauge.

The Mavli–Marwar metre-gauge line was opened in 1936.

== Cultural references ==
=== In fiction ===
The station is mentioned in Chapter 1 of Rudyard Kipling's short story "The Man Who Would Be King" which was first published in The Phantom Rickshaw and other Eerie Tales (1888). It is the meeting place of the narrator, Kipling in all but name, and Daniel Dravot.

Preceding station	Indian Railways	Following station
Dhareshwar towards ?	North Western Railway zone Jaipur–Ahmedabad line	Auwa towards ?
Terminus	North Western Railway zone Marwar Junction–Munabao line	Rajakiawas towards ?
Terminus	North Western Railway zone Mavli–Marwar line	Marwar Ranawas towards ?
