= Lunawa, Rajasthan =

Village in Rajasthan, India

Lunawa
- Location in Rajasthan, India Lunawa (India)
- Coordinates: 25.1333°N 73.3167°E
- Country: India
- State: Rajasthan
- District: Pali

Government
  - Body: Gram panchayat
- Elevation: 320 m (1,050 ft)

Population (2001)
  - Total: 4,998

Languages
  - Official: Hindi
- Time zone: UTC+5:30 (IST)
- Telephone code: 02938
- ISO 3166 code: RJ-IN
- Vehicle registration: RJ-22

Lunawa is one of the largest villages in Bali Tehsil, in Pali district, Rajasthan, India. The Village is located in the Aravalli of Rajasthan.

Lunawa has more than 30 temples. There are many Jain temples, Hindu Temple like Jaleri Maa Temple, Kantheshwar Mahadev Temple, Shree Khodiyaar Maa Temple, Charbhuja Temple, Shree Thakur Ji Temple etc. The village is situated near Aravalli hills.
