= Barwa, Narkatiaganj (census code 216634) =

Barwa
- Village
- Location within Bihar Location within India
- Coordinates: 27.1012608°N 84.5517028°E
- Country: India
- State: Bihar
- District: West Champaran district
- Block: Narkatiaganj

Languages
  - Official: Hindi
- Time zone: UTC+5:30 (IST)
- ISO 3166 code: IN-BR
- 2011 census code: 216634

Barwa is a village in West Champaran district in the Indian state of Bihar. It is located in the Narkatiaganj block.

== Demographics ==
As of the 2011 census of India, Barwa had a population of 2,110 in 342 households. Males constitute 53.69% of the population and females 46.3%. Barwa has an average literacy rate of 46.58%, lower than the national average of 74%: male literacy is 58.59%, and female literacy is 41.4%. In Barwa, 17.86% of the population is under 6 years of age.
