= Ranawas =

- rural
- Location in Rajasthan, India Ranawas (India)
- Coordinates: 25°40′00″N 73°44′30″E
- Country: India
- State: Rajasthan
- District: Pali
- Elevation: 299 m (981 ft)

Population (2001)
  - Total: 5,241

Languages
  - Official: Hindi
- Time zone: UTC+5:30 (IST)
- PIN: 306023
- Telephone code: 02935
- ISO 3166 code: RJ-IN
- Vehicle registration: RJ-22
- Sex ratio: 958 ♂/♀

Ranawas is a village located in Kharci Tehsil of Pali district in Rajasthan state of India. It is also a railway station on Marwar Junction to Udaipur route.

There is one college for higher education Shri Jain Terapanth College established in 1975. Shri Jain Terapanth Teachers Training College For Women is the new college for women. This village called as Vidhya Nagari, because in this village a Higher Secondary school Sri Sumati Shiksha Sadan was established more than 75 ago years Founded in September 1944 and it was a very famous school in all Rajasthan and in India. Sri Keshari Mal Ji Surana popularly known as KAKASHA was the main architecture of this Vidhya Nagari.

== Demographics ==
Population of Ranawas is 5,241 according to census 2001. where male population is 2,677 while female population is 2,564. AND marudhar kesari s.s.h. school in village.a police station in village. and many more small school in village. exp. government school.and many temple main one temple is shree aai mataji temple in village center.and 4-5 villages main market.
