= Barwar =

Barwar may refer to:

- Barwar, Lakhimpur Kheri, a town in Uttar Pradesh, India
- Barwari or Barwar, a region in northern Iraq
- Barwar (caste)
