= Dhani-Sela =

Village in Rajasthan, India

Dhani is a village in Bali tehsil in the Pali district of the Indian state of Rajasthan, on state highway SH 62 in a valley on the western side of the Aravalli Range.
