= Beawar railway station =

Railway station in Rajasthan, India

Beawar

General information
- Location: Beawar, Beawar district, Rajasthan; India
- Coordinates: 26.107269°N 74.312862°E
- Elevation: 439 m (1,440 ft)
- System: Indian Railways station
- Owner: Indian Railways
- Operator: North Western Railway
- Line: Jaipur–Ahmedabad line
- Platforms: 3
- Tracks: 4

Construction
- Structure type: Standard (on ground station)
- Parking: Yes

Other information
- Status: Functioning
- Station code: BER
- Zone(s): North Western Railway
- Division(s): Ajmer

History
- Opened: 1896
- Electrified: 2021

Passengers
- 7000
Location
- Location within India Location within Rajasthan

Beawar railway station is a railway station in Beawar district of Rajasthan. Its code is BER. It serves Beawar city. The station consists of 3 platforms. Passenger, Express, and Superfast trains halt here.

Beawar is NSG-4 category station of Ajmer railway division of North Western Railway Zone. The Station is well connected to cities like Delhi, Mumbai, Bengaluru, Jaipur etc. Some Important trains which halt here are Ashram Express, Uttaranchal Express, Ranikhet Express, Yoga Express etc.

It is a B Category Railway Station. It is among the top 20 stations in Rajasthan.

== Facilities ==
The station offers the following amenities: Parking, ATM, foot overbridge, Coach indicator, Wifi, Dustbins, Booking windows, Waiting room and toilets.
