= Jawali, Rajasthan =

Village in Rajasthan, India

Coordinates: 25.462°N 73.395°E

Jawali is a village in Pali district of Rajasthan, India. It is located 40.1 km distance from its District headquarters, Pali

Jawali railway station is situated between Palanpur Junction and Marwar Junction. The station falls under Rani Station jurisdiction, which is located 15 km away.
