= Beerwah =

Beerwah may refer to:

- Beerwah, Queensland, a small town on the hinterland Sunshine Coast, Queensland, Australia, at the side of the Glass House Mountains National Park
- Mount Beerwah, the tallest of the Glass House Mountains
- Beerwah, Jammu and Kashmir, a town in India
