= Barwa, Rajasthan =

Barwa
- village
- Location in Rajasthan, India Barwa (India)
- Coordinates: 25.129977°N 73.304901°E
- Country: India
- State: Rajasthan
- District: Pali, Rajasthan

Government
  - Body: Gram panchayat
- Elevation: 282 m (925 ft)

Population (2011)
  - Total: 2,592

Languages
  - Main Language: Rajasthani
  - Govt Language: Hindi
- Time zone: UTC+5:30 (IST)
- PIN: 306706
- Telephone code: 02938
- ISO 3166 code: RJ-IN
- Vehicle registration: RJ-22

Barwa is a village located in the Bali tehsil of Pali district of Rajasthan state, in the Aravalli Range.

== Demographics ==
The population of Barwa was 2,592 according to the 2011 census.
