= Barwa, Nawanshahr =

Barwa
- Village
- Location in Punjab, India Barwa (India)
- Coordinates: 31.1314849°N 75.9025727°E
- Country: India
- State: Punjab
- District: Shaheed Bhagat Singh Nagar

Government
  - Type: Panchayat raj
  - Body: Gram panchayat
- Elevation: 251 m (823 ft)

Population (2011)
  - Total: 1,036
- Sex ratio 523/513 ♂/♀

Languages
  - Official: Punjabi
- Time zone: UTC+5:30 (IST)
- PIN: 144516
- Telephone code: 01823
- ISO 3166 code: IN-PB
- Post office: Langroya
- Website: nawanshahr.nic.in

Barwa is a village in Shaheed Bhagat Singh Nagar district of Punjab State, India. It is situated on Mehandpur-Bhagoran road and located 4.8 kilometres (3.0 mi) away from postal head office Langroya, 14.6 kilometres (9.1 mi) from Balachaur, 9.6 kilometres (6.0 mi) from district headquarter Shaheed Bhagat Singh Nagar and 84 kilometres (52 mi) from state capital Chandigarh. The village is administrated by Sarpanch an elected representative of the village.

== Demography ==
As of 2011, Barwa has a total number of 261 houses and population of 1140 of which 560 include are males while 580 are females according to the report published by Census India in 2011. The literacy rate of Barwa is 82.19%, higher than the state average of 75.84%. The population of children under the age of 6 years is 90 which is 7.89% of total population of Barwa, and child sex ratio is approximately 837 as compared to Punjab state average of 846.

Most of the people are from Schedule Caste which constitutes 57.98% of total population in Barwa. The town does not have any Schedule Tribe population so far.

As per the report published by Census India in 2011, 321 people were engaged in work activities out of the total population of Barwa which includes 285 males and 36 females. According to census survey report 2011, 73.85% workers describe their work as main work and 26.15% workers are involved in Marginal activity providing livelihood for less than 6 months.

== Education ==
The village has a Punjabi medium, co-ed upper primary school founded in 2004 The schools provide mid-day meal which prepared in school premises as per Indian Midday Meal Scheme. the school provide free education to children between the ages of 6 and 14 as per Right of Children to Free and Compulsory Education Act.

KC Engineering College and Doaba Khalsa Trust Group Of Institutions are the nearest colleges. Industrial Training Institute for women (ITI Nawanshahr) is 8 kilometres (5.0 mi) away from the village. The village is 54 kilometres (34 mi) from Lovely Professional University.

== Landmarks ==
Badwal Mata Mandir, Barwa Mata Mandir, Badwal Jathere and Gurudwara Singh Sabha are the religious sites in Barwa.

== Transport ==
Nawanshahr train station is the nearest train station however, Garhshankar Junction railway station is 16.6 kilometres (10.3 mi) away from the village. Sahnewal Airport is the nearest domestic airport which located 62 kilometres (39 mi) away in Ludhiana and the nearest international airport is located in Chandigarh also Sri Guru Ram Dass Jee International Airport is the second nearest airport which is 162 kilometres (101 mi) away in Amritsar.

== See also ==
- List of villages in India
