= Barwa, Narkatiaganj (census code 216656) =

Barwa
- Village
- Location within Bihar Location within India
- Coordinates: 27.0919118°N 84.46531534°E
- Country: India
- State: Bihar
- District: West Champaran district
- Block: Narkatiaganj

Languages
  - Official: Hindi
- Time zone: UTC+5:30 (IST)
- ISO 3166 code: IN-BR
- 2011 census code: 216656

Barwa is a village in West Champaran district in the Indian state of Bihar. It is located in the Narkatiaganj block.

== Demographics ==
As of the 2011 census of India, Barwa had a population of 1,943 in 345 households. Males constitute 52.7% of the population and females 47.2%. Barwa has an average literacy rate of 41.53%, lower than the national average of 74%: male literacy is 66%, and female literacy is 33%. In Barwa, 21.25% of the population is under 6 years of age.
