= Jawali taluka =

Jawali is name of a taluka in Satara district of Maharashtra. Taluka has 103 villages under it including a village of same name as taluka, Jawali.

Jawali taluka recently became the first taluka to become Maharashtra's liquor-free taluka.
