= Ajmer railway division =

Railway division of India

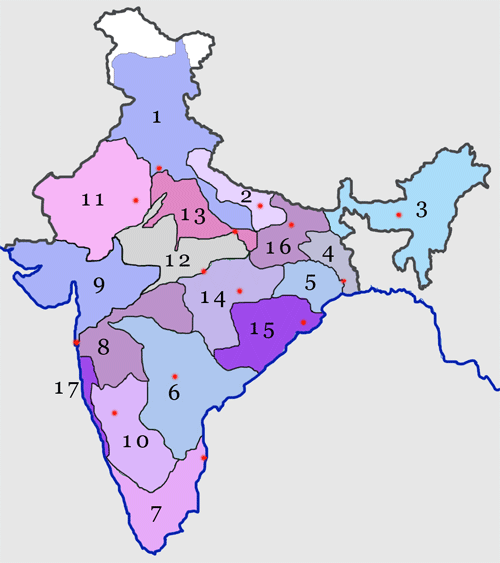
- 11-North Western Railway

Overview
- Headquarters: Ajmer Junction railway station
- Locale: Rajasthan
- Dates of operation: 1951; 74 years ago–

Technical
- Track gauge: Mixed

Other
- Website: NWR official website

Ajmer railway division is one of the four railway divisions under the jurisdiction of North Western Railway zone of the Indian Railways. This railway division was formed on 5 November 1951 and its headquarter is located at Ajmer in the state of Rajasthan of India.

Jaipur railway division, Bikaner railway division and Jodhpur railway division are the other three railway divisions under NWR Zone headquartered at Jaipur. This division is one of the key enabler of the Delhi Mumbai Industrial Corridor Project by virtue of running parts of the railways 1,500 km long network of Western Dedicated Freight Corridor.

== Rail transport infrastructure ==
The zone has the following types of locomotive engines:
(Legends: W - broad gauge, D - diesel, G - goods, M - mixed, P - passenger)

- Abu Road railway station (ABR) diesel sheds: WDM2s, WDM3s, WDG3A and WDG4s

== Medical facilities ==
For the employees and their families, the division also has the following healthcare facilities:

- Zonal hospitals
  - Jaipur Zonal Railway Hospital near Jaipur Junction railway station
- Divisional hospitals
  - Ajmer Divisional Railway Hospital near Ajmer Junction railway station
- Sub-divisional hospitals
  - Abu Road Sub-Divisional Railway Hospital near Abu Road railway station (Ajmer division)
- Health units, several (total 29 across the whole division, including 3 other zones)
- First aid posts, unknown (no more than a total of two across the whole zone)

== Training ==
The zone has the following training institutes:

- Zonal Railway Training Institute, Udaipur in Ajmer division
- Diesel Traction Training Centre, Abu Road in Ajmer division
- Divisional Training Centre (Engineering), Ajmer
- Supervisor's Training Centre, Ajmer
- Basic Training Centre (C&W), Ajmer
- Basic Training Centre (Loco), Ajmer
- Area Training Centre, Ajmer

== Route and track length ==
- North Western Railway zone
  - Route km: broad gauge 2,575.03 kilometres (1,600.05 mi), metre gauge 2,874.23 kilometres (1,785.96 mi), total 5,449.29 kilometres (3,386.03 mi)
  - Track km: broad gauge 6,696.36 kilometres (4,160.93 mi), metre gauge 733.44 kilometres (455.74 mi), total 7,329.80 kilometres (4,554.53 mi)
  - Ajmer railway division
    - Route km: broad gauge 732.56 kilometres (455.19 mi), metre gauge 442.29 kilometres (274.83 mi), total 1,174.85 kilometres (730.02 mi)
    - Track km: broad gauge 1,149.0 kilometres (714.0 mi), metre gauge 466.73 kilometres (290.01 mi), total 1,617.83 kilometres (1,005.27 mi)

== List of railway stations and towns ==
The list includes the stations under the AJMER railway division and their station category.

| Category of station | No. of stations | Names of stations |
|---|---|---|
| A-1 Category | 1 | Ajmer Junction |
| A Category | 6 | Bhilwara, Abu Road, Falna, Marwar Junction, Rani, Udaipur City |
| B Category | 3 | Beawar, Bijainagar, Pindwara, |
| C Category (Suburban station) | - | - |
| D Category | - | - |
| E Category | - | - |
| F Category; Halt Station | - | - |
| Total | - | - |

Stations closed for Passengers -
