= Jaipur–Ahmedabad main line =

Railway line in India

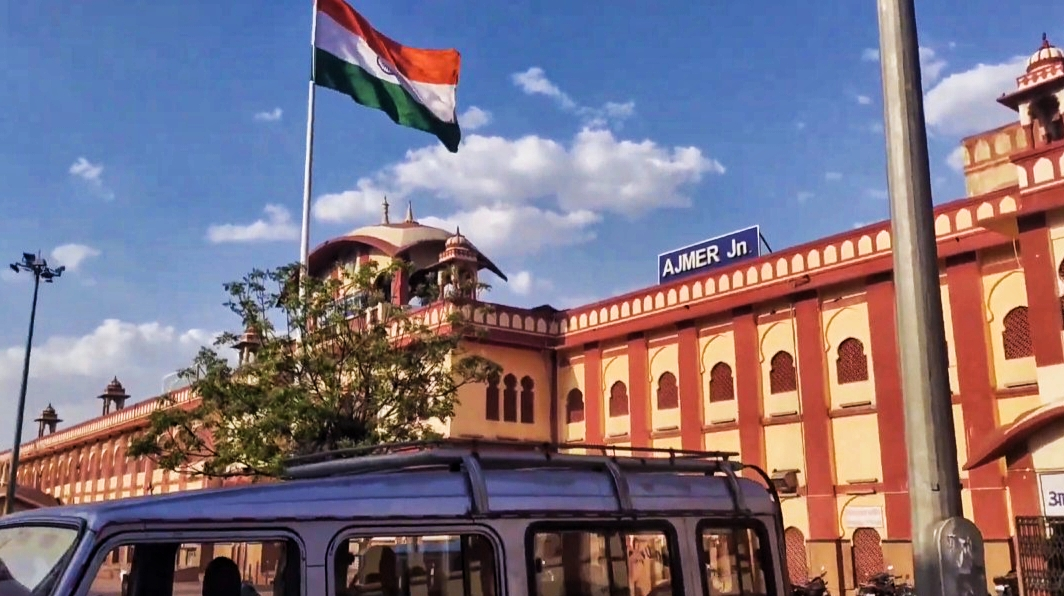
- Ajmer Junction railway station an important railway station on Jaipur–Ahmedabad main line

Overview
- Status: Operational
- Owner: Indian Railways
- Locale: Rajasthan, Gujarat
- Termini: Jaipur; Ahmedabad
- Website: wr.indianrailways.gov.in nwr.indianrailways.gov.in

Service
- Operator(s): North Western Railway, Western Railway

History
- Opened: 1881

Technical
- Track length: 630 km (391 mi)
- Track gauge: 1,676 mm (5 ft 6 in) broad gauge
- Electrification: Yes
- Operating speed: 130 km/h (81 mph)
- Highest elevation: Jaipur 428 m (1,404 ft), Ahmedabad 52.5 m (172 ft)

The Jaipur–Ahmedabad main line connects Jaipur, the capital of Rajasthan to Ahmedabad, the largest city of Gujarat in India. It is present on Ahmedabad–Delhi main line. Swarna Jayanti Rajdhani Express is the fastest train in this route.

== History ==
Rajputana State Railway opened the Delhi–Bandikui 1,000 mm (3 ft 3 3/8 in)-wide metre-gauge line in 1874, extended it to Ajmer in 1875 and to Ahmedabad in 1881.

The Delhi–Ajmer metre-gauge line was converted to 5 ft 6 in (1,676 mm) broad gauge in 1994. The Ahmedabad–Ajmer sector was fully converted to broad gauge in 1997.

Railway electrification work is now completed in Rewari–Alwar–Bandikui–Jaipur–Palanpur–Ahmedabad sector.

== Passenger movement ==
Ahmedabad, Jaipur and Ajmer on this line, are amongst the top hundred booking stations of Indian Railways.

== Sheds and workshops ==
Sabarmati earlier had a steam loco shed, now it has diesel loco shop. It holds 125+ WDG-4 locomotives. Ajmer has a diesel loco workshop and a carriage and wagon workshop. Opened in 1876, it is one of Indian Railway's premier workshops. It maintains Palace on Wheels rake. Abu Road has a diesel loco shed. Phulera has a diesel shed.

== See also ==
- List of railway lines in India
