= List of Regional Transport Office districts in India =

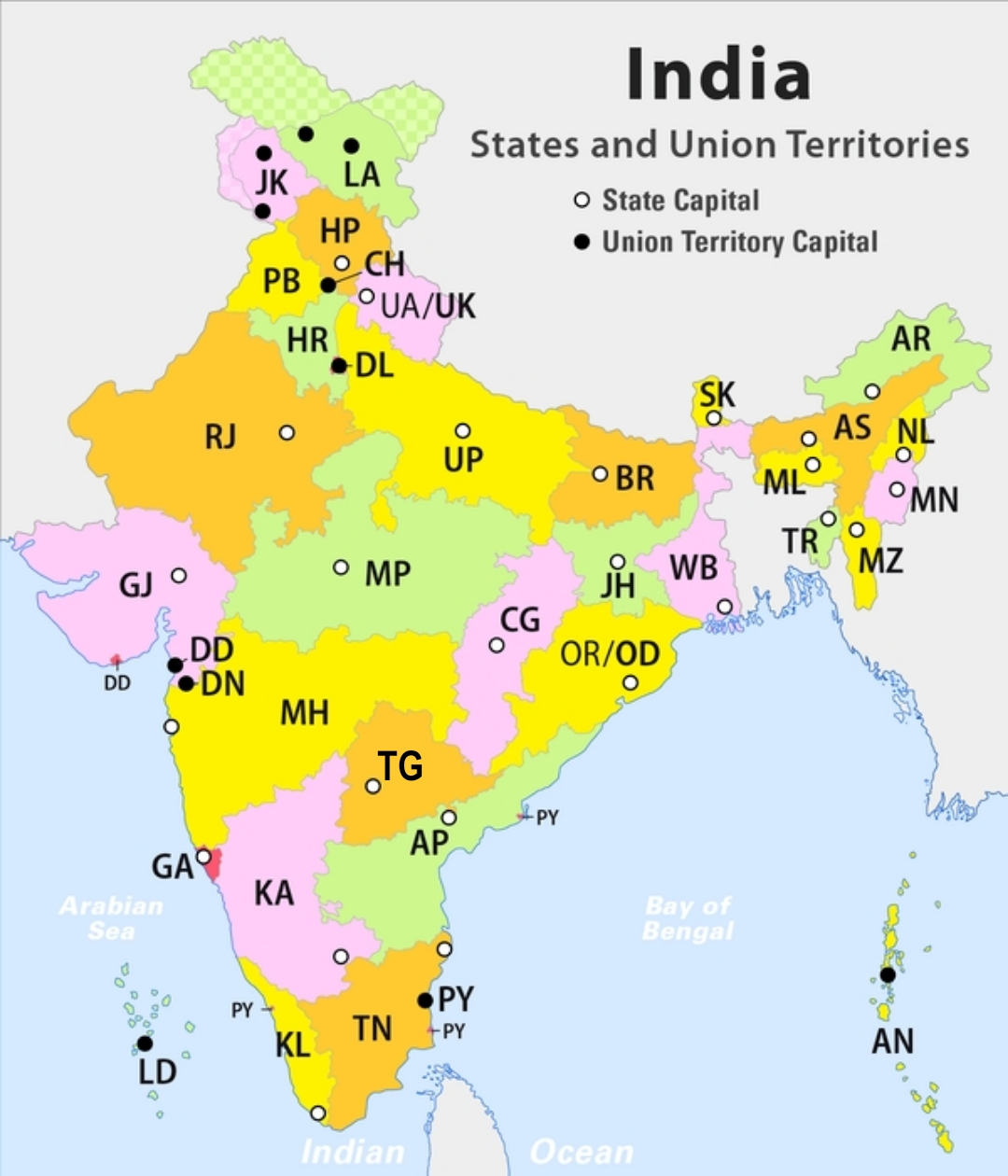
Two-letter state and union territory codes of India

This is a list of the Indian Regional Transport Offices and the assigned codes for vehicle registration. These are broken down to states or union territories and their districts. These RTO offices, governed by the respective state and union territory Transport Departments, are led by Regional Transport Officers (RTOs) and are tasked with enforcing the Motor Vehicles Act, 1988, and its associated rules.

== AP—Andhra Pradesh ==
The Andhra Pradesh state government has decided to issue uniform registration numbers for vehicles across Andhra Pradesh. Since February 2019, all new vehicles in Andhra Pradesh are registered with AP-39 code by default. Andhra Pradesh is the first state to implement the "one state-one code" policy.

In 2023, the state government has launched new series, AP-40.

| Code | Office location | Jurisdiction area | Annotations |
|---|---|---|---|
| AP-39, AP-40 | RTA | Tirupati district | |
| AP-39, AP-40 | RTA | Krishna district | |
| AP-39, AP-40 | RTA | NTR district | |
| AP-39, AP-40 | RTA | Vizianagaram district | |
| AP-39, AP-40 | RTA | Visakhapatnam district | |
| AP-39, AP-40 | RTA | Alluri Sitharama Raju district | |
| AP-39, AP-40 | RTA | Anakapalli district | |
| AP-39, AP-40 | RTA | Kakinada district | |
| AP-39, AP-40 | RTA | East Godavari | |
| AP-39, AP-40 | RTA | Konaseema district | |
| AP-39, AP-40 | RTA | Eluru district | |
| AP-39, AP-40 | RTA | West Godavari district | |
| AP-39, AP-40 | RTA | Palnadu district | |
| AP-39, AP-40 | RTA | Guntur district | |
| AP-39, AP-40 | RTA | Bapatla district | |
| AP-39, AP-40 | RTA | Polavaram district | |
| AP-39, AP-40 | RTA | Prakasam district | |
| AP-39, AP-40 | RTA | Sri Potti Sriramulu Nellore district | |
| AP-39, AP-40 | RTA | Kurnool district | |
| AP-39, AP-40 | RTA | Nandyal district | |
| AP-39, AP-40 | RTA | Anantapur district | |
| AP-39, AP-40 | RTA | Sri Sathya Sai district | |
| AP-39, AP-40 | RTA | YSR district | |
| AP-39, AP-40 | RTA | Annamayya district | |
| AP-39, AP-40 | RTA | Parvathipuram Manyam district | |
| AP-39, AP-40 | RTA | Srikakulam district | |
| AP-39, AP-40 | RTA | Chittoor district | |
| AP-39, AP-40 | RTA | | All series of Andhra Pradesh State Road Transport Corporation (APSRTC) vehicles start with ‘Z’. |
| AP-39, AP-40 | RTA | | All series of Andhra Pradesh state police vehicles start with 'P'. |

Specifics in the Andhra Pradesh series
| Scheme and/or example | Meaning |
|---|---|
| AP 01 A 1234 to AP 01 SZ 1234 | The letters A to S are reserved to passenger vehicles. |
| AP-01-Px : AP 01 P 1234, AP 01 PA 1234, AP 01 PB 1234, AP 01 PC 1234 | AP-01-P is specifically used for state police vehicles. |
| AP 01 T 1234 to AP 01 YZ 1234 | The letters T, U, V, W, X, Y are reserved for commercial vehicles. |
| AP-01-Z : AP 01 Z xxxx | The letter Z is reserved for the State Road Transport (APSRTC) buses. |

Older registrations of Andhra Pradesh till 2019 (Districts outside Telangana)
| Code | Jurisdiction | Annotations |
|---|---|---|
| AP 02 | Ananthapuramu District | |
| AP 03 | Chittoor District | |
| AP 04 | YSR Kadapa District | |
| AP 05 | East Godavari District | RTO was located in Kakinada, former district headquarters of undivided East Godavari District |
| AP 07 | Guntur district | |
| AP 16 | Krishna District | RTO was located in Vijayawada, former district headquarters of undivided Krishna District |
| AP 18 P | Andhra Pradesh Police | |
| AP 21 | Kurnool District | |
| AP 26 | Nellore District | |
| AP 27 | Prakasam District | |
| AP 30 | Srikakulam District | |
| AP 31 | Vishakhapatnam District | AP 32, AP 33, and AP 34 were also reserved for Vishakhapatnam, with only few vehicles getting these registrations. |
| AP 35 | Vizianagaram District | |
| AP 37 | West Godavari District | RTO was located in Eluru, former district headquarters of undivided West Godavari District |

== AR—Arunachal Pradesh ==
| Code | Office location | Jurisdiction area | Annotations |
|---|---|---|---|
| AR-01; AR-02 | Itanagar | Papum Pare district | |
| AR-03 | Tawang | Tawang district | |
| AR-04 | Bomdila | West Kameng district | |
| AR-05 | Seppa | East Kameng district | |
| AR-06 | Ziro | Lower Subansiri district | |
| AR-07 | Daporijo | Upper Subansiri district | |
| AR-08 | Along | West Siang district | |
| AR-09 | Pasighat | East Siang district | |
| AR-10 | Anini | Dibang Valley district | |
| AR-11 | Tezu | Lohit district | |
| AR-12 | Changlang | Changlang district | |
| AR-13 | Khonsa | Tirap district | |
| AR-14 | Yingkiong | Upper Siang district | |
| AR-15 | Koloriang | Kurung Kumey district | |
| AR-16 | Roing | Dibang Valley district | |
| AR-17 | Hawai | Anjaw district | |
| AR-19 | Palin | Kra Daadi district | |
| AR-20 | Namsai | Namsai district | On November 17, 2014, Namsai district was carved out from the erstwhile Lohit district. |
| AR-22 | Siji | Lower Siang district | On November 24, 2018, Lower Siang district was carved out from the erstwhile West Siang district. |

== AS—Assam ==
| Code | Office location | Jurisdiction area | Annotations |
|---|---|---|---|
| AS-01 | Guwahati | Kamrup district | |
| AS-02 | Nagaon | Nagaon district | |
| AS-03 | Jorhat | Jorhat district | |
| AS-04 | Sivasagar | Sivasagar district | |
| AS-05 | Golaghat | Golaghat district | |
| AS-06 | Dibrugarh | Dibrugarh district | |
| AS-07 | Lakhimpur | Lakhimpur district | |
| AS-08 | Haflong | Dima Hasao district | |
| AS-09 | Karbi Anglong | Karbi Anglong district | |
| AS-10 | Karimganj | Karimganj district | |
| AS-11 | Silchar | Cachar district | |
| AS-12 | Tezpur | Sonitpur district | |
| AS-13 | Darrang | Darrang district | |
| AS-14 | Nalbari | Nalbari district | |
| AS-15 | Barpeta | Barpeta district | |
| AS-16 | Kokrajhar | Kokrajhar district | |
| AS-17 | Dhubri | Dhubri district | |
| AS-18 | Goalpara | Goalpara district | |
| AS-19 | Bongaigaon | Bongaigaon district | |
| AS-20 | | entire Assam State | vehicles of Assam State Transport Corporation |
| AS-21 | Morigaon | Morigaon district | |
| AS-22 | Dhemaji | Dhemaji district | |
| AS-23 | Tinsukia | Tinsukia district | |
| AS-24 | Hailakandi | Hailakandi district | |
| AS-25 | Kamrup | Kamrup district | |
| AS-26 | Kajalgaon | Chirang district | |
| AS-27 | Udalguri | Udalguri district | |
| AS-29 | Majuli | Majuli district | |
| AS-30 | Assam Police | Assam Police | |
| AS-31 | Hojai | Hojai district | |
| AS-32 | Biswanath Chariali | Biswanath district | |
| AS-33 | Charaideo | Charaideo district | |
| AS-34 | Hatsingimari | South Salmara-Mankachar district | |

== BR—Bihar ==
| Code | Office location | Jurisdiction area | Annotations |
|---|---|---|---|
| BR-01 | Patna | Patna district | |
| BR-02 | Gaya | Gaya district | |
| BR-03 | Arrah | Bhojpur district | |
| BR-04 | Chhapra | Saran district | |
| BR-05 | Motihari | East Champaran district | |
| BR-06 | Muzaffarpur | Muzaffarpur district | |
| BR-07 | Darbhanga | Darbhanga district | |
| BR-08 | Munger | Munger district | |
| BR-09 | Begusarai | Begusarai district | |
| BR-10 | Bhagalpur | Bhagalpur district | |
| BR-11 | Purnia | Purnia district | |
| BR-19 | Saharsa | Saharsa district | |
| BR-21 | Bihar Sharif | Nalanda district | |
| BR-22 | Bettiah | West Champaran district | |
| BR-24 | Dehri | Rohtas district | |
| BR-25 | Jehanabad | Jehanabad district | |
| BR-26 | Aurangabad | Aurangabad district | |
| BR-27 | Nawada | Nawada district | |
| BR-28 | Gopalganj | Gopalganj district | |
| BR-29 | Siwan | Siwan district | |
| BR-30 | Sitamarhi | Sitamarhi district | |
| BR-31 | Hajipur | Vaishali district | |
| BR-32 | Madhubani | Madhubani district | |
| BR-33 | Samastipur | Samastipur district | |
| BR-34 | Khagaria | Khagaria district | |
| BR-37 | Kishanganj | Kishanganj district | |
| BR-38 | Araria | Araria district | |
| BR-39 | Katihar | Katihar district | |
| BR-43 | Madhepura | Madhepura district | |
| BR-44 | Buxar | Buxar district | |
| BR-45 | Bhabua | Kaimur district | |
| BR-46 | Jamui | Jamui district | |
| BR-50 | Supaul | Supaul district | |
| BR-51 | Banka | Banka district | |
| BR-52 | Sheikhpura | Sheikhpura district | |
| BR-53 | Lakhisarai | Lakhisarai district | |
| BR-55 | Sheohar | Sheohar district | |
| BR-56 | Arwal | Arwal district | |

== CG—Chhattisgarh ==
| Code | Office location | Jurisdiction area | Annotations |
|---|---|---|---|
| CG-01 | | entire Chhattisgarh | Governor of Chhattisgarh vehicles |
| CG-02 | | entire Chhattisgarh | Chhattisgarh Government vehicles |
| CG-03 | | entire Chhattisgarh | Chhattisgarh Police vehicles |
| CG-04 | Raipur | Raipur district | |
| CG-05 | Dhamtari | Dhamtari district | |
| CG-06 | Mahasamund | Mahasamund district | |
| CG-07 | Durg | Durg district | |
| CG-08 | Rajnandgaon | Rajnandgaon district | |
| CG-09 | Kawardha | Kabirdham district | |
| CG-10 | Bilaspur | Bilaspur district | |
| CG-11 | Janjgir | Janjgir–Champa district | |
| CG-12 | Korba | Korba district | |
| CG-13 | Raigarh | Raigarh district | |
| CG-14 | Jashpur Nagar | Jashpur district | |
| CG-15 | Ambikapur | Surguja district | |
| CG-16 | Baikunthpur | Koriya district | |
| CG-17 | Jagdalpur | Bastar district | |
| CG-18 | Dantewada | Dantewada district | |
| CG-19 | Kanker | Kanker district | |
| CG-20 | Bijapur | Bijapur district | |
| CG-21 | Narayanpur | Narayanpur district | |
| CG-22 | Baloda Bazar | Baloda Bazar district | |
| CG-23 | Gariaband | Gariaband district | |
| CG-24 | Balod | Balod district | |
| CG-25 | Bemetara | Bemetara district | |
| CG-26 | Sukma | Sukma district | |
| CG-27 | Kondagaon | Kondagaon district | |
| CG-28 | Mungeli | Mungeli district | |
| CG-29 | Surajpur | Surajpur district | |
| CG-30 | Balrampur | Balrampur district | |

== CH—Chandigarh ==
| Code | Office location | Jurisdiction area | Annotations |
|---|---|---|---|
| CH-01; CH-02; CH-03; CH-04 | Chandigarh | Chandigarh district | |

== DD—Dadra and Nagar Haveli and Daman and Diu ==
| Code | Office location | Jurisdiction area | Annotations |
|---|---|---|---|
| DD-01 | Silvassa | Dadra and Nagar Haveli district | Previously DN-09, before the merger of UT of Daman & Diu and UT of Dadra & Nagar Haveli |
| DD-02 | Diu | Diu district | |
| DD-03 | Daman | Daman district | |

== DL—Delhi ==
| Code | Office location | Jurisdiction area | Annotations |
|---|---|---|---|
| DL-1 | Mall Road, Vishwavidyalaya | North Delhi District: Civil Lines, Pratap Bagh, Kotwali, Bela Road, Andha Mugal, Mori Gate, Majnu Ka Tila, Gulabi Bagh, Red Fort, Sant Nagar, Sarai Rohilla, Yamuna Bazar, Roop Nagar, Inder Lok, Lahori Gate, Maurice Nagar, Sadar Bazar, Church Mission, Shakti Nagar, Ahata Kedara, Town Hall, Subzi Mandi, Bara Hindu Rao, Nai Sarak, Tis Hazari, Kashmere Gate, Chandni Chowk | |
| DL-2 | Indraprastha Depot | New Delhi District: Tilak Marg, R.M.L.Hospital, Chanakya Puri, Parliament St., Sucheta Kriplani Hospital, Tughlaq Road, Boat Club, Mandi House, North Avenue Panchkuian Road, Kali Bari Marg, South Avenue, Gole Market, Rabinder Nagar, Malcha Marg, Connaught Place, Kaka Nagar | |
| DL-3 | DDA Market, Sheikh Sarai | South Delhi District: Hauz Khas, Amar Colony, C.R Park, Malviya Nagar, Garhi, Ambedkar Nagar, Saket, Okhla, Madangir, Pushp Vihar, Sunlight Colony, Sainik Farm, Mehrauli, New Friends Colony, Kalkaji, Defence Colony, Nehru Place, Gulmohar Park, Sukhdev Vihar, Badarpur, AIIMS, Bharat Nagar, Sarita Vihar, Lodhi Colony, Hz.Nizammudin, Sangam Vihar, Pragati Vihar, Jangpura, East Kidwai Nagar, Khan Pur, Sarai Kale Khan, Lajpat Nagar, Greater Kailash, Panchsheel | |
| DL-4 | Janakpuri | West Delhi District I: Janakpuri, Vikaspuri, Keshopur, TilakNagar, Uttam Nagar, Mohan Garden, Nawada, Kakrola, Paschim Vihar, Meera Bagh, New Multan Nagar, Nangloi, Tikri Border, Nilothi, Nangloi Jat, Mundka, Baprola, Hari Nagar, Ashok Nagar, Prem Nagar, Subhash Nagar | |
| DL-5 | Loni Road, Shahdara | North East Delhi District: Seelampur, Gamri, Nand Nagari, Gokalpuri, Shahdara, Ashok Nagar, Khazuri Khas, Welcome Colony, Sunder Nagar, Karawal Nagar, Mansarover Park, Harsh Vihar, Bhajanpura, Seemapuri, Yamuna Vihar, G.T.B. Nagar | |
| DL-6 | ISBT Sarai Kale Khan | Central Delhi District: Daryaganj, Lalkuan, Prasha Nagar, Chandni Mahal, I.P. Estate, Rajender Nagar, Turkmangate, LNJP Hospital, Pusa Road, Jama Masjid, Pahar Ganj, Sita Ram Bazar, Kamla Market, DBG Road, Sangtrashan, Shahganj, Shidipura, Nabi Karim, Hauz Qazi, Govt. Qr. Devnagar, Ballimaran, Karol Bagh | |
| DL-7 | DTC Depot, Mayur Vihar | East Delhi District-I: KalyanPuri, Laxmi Nagar, PreetVihar, New Ashok Nagar, Patparganj, Shakarpur, Trilokpuri, Mayur Vihar-I&II, Karkardooma | |
| DL-8 | DTC Depot, Wazirpur | North West Delhi District-I: Model Town, Jahangirpuri, Sangam Park, Adarsh Nagar, Vijay Nagar, Keshav Puram, Ashok Vihar, Shalimar Bagh, Wazirpur, Saraswati Vihar, Kingsway Camp, Pitampura, Mukherjee Nagar, Rani Bagh, Azadpur, Rampura, Tri Nagar, Gujrawalan | |
| DL-9 | Sector-10, Dwarka | South West Delhi District-I: Inderpuri, Naraina, Mayapuri, Najafgarh, Kapashera, Jafarpur Kalan, Dwarka, Palam, Matiala, Mahavir Enclave, Bijwasan, Qutub Vihar, Chhawla, Dabri, Sagarpur | |
| DL-10 | Raja Garden | West Delhi District-II: Anand Parbat, Moti Nagar, Patel Nagar, Punjabi Bagh, Kirti Nagar Rajouri Garden | also DL-4CC to DL-4CM, DL4-CNA and onwards, DL-4SL, DL-4SN, DL-4SP, DL-4SR, DL-4SNA |
| DL-11 | DTC Depot, Rohini | North West Delhi District-II: Sultanpuri, Mangolpuri, Samaypur Badli, Prasant Vihar, Auchandi Border, Bawana, Alipur, Rohini, Kanjhavala, Narela, Kirari, Aman Vihar, Mubarakpur, Qutab Garh, Jonti, Mungeshpur, Mukandpur, Khera Kalan | also DL-8CE to DL-8CX, DL-8SAA to DL-8SAY |
| DL-12 | DTC Depot, Vasant Vihar | South West Delhi District-II: Vasant Vihar, Vasant Kunj, Delhi Cantt., Moti Bagh, RK Puram, Munirka, Sarojini Nagar, Safdarjung Enclave, Green Park, Ghitorni, Mahipalpur, Rajokri, Mehrauli, Sultanpur, Chhatarpur | |
| DL-13 | CBD Ground, Surajmal Vihar | East Delhi District-II: Gazipur, GandhiNagar, Krishna Nagar, Anand Vihar, Old Seelampur, Mandawali, New Shahdara, Geeta Colony, VivekVihar, Jheel | also DL-7C (up to 8705), DL-7CH (0632 onwards), DL-7CG, DL-7CF (3543 onwards), DL-7S to DL-7SQ, DL-7SY (up to 7773), DL-7SAF (up to 5122), DL-7SAG, DL-7SAY (up to 1494) |

Note: RTO offices from DL10 to DL13 usually register private vehicles with letters like 'A', 'P', 'D', etc. after the core registration series of C and S are exhausted. This is because the 10-digit registration series cannot accommodate CAA or SAA onwards like the other codes. Currently, most public service and first responder vehicles (except e-rickshaws) are registered under the DL1 series.

Specifics in the Delhi series
| Example or scheme | Meaning |
|---|---|
| DL −1 A | The letter A is reserved for ambulances. |
| DL-1B | The letter B is reserved for DMRC feeder buses. |
| DL −*C; CA - CZ; CAA... | The letter C is reserved for fuel powered/electric cars. |
| DL −1 D | The letter D is reserved for two/four wheeled private vehicles driven by handicapped drivers. |
| DL-*ER,ERA and so on | The letter series ER is reserved for electric rickshaws. |
| DL-2F | The letter F is reserved for vanity (VIP) series numbers for passenger vehicles. |
| DL-1G | The letter G is reserved for heavy trucks. |
| DL-1K | The letter K is reserved for school vans. |
| DL-1L | The letter L is reserved for light trucks. |
| DL-1M | The letter M is reserved for midsize trucks. |
| DL-1N | The letter N is reserved for self-drive vehicles (comes under commercial vehicle category). |
| DL-1P | The letter P is reserved for buses, including DTC, DIMTS, tourist and even heavy school buses. |
| DL-1Q | The letter Q is reserved for phatphat seva or rural service share taxis. |
| DL-1R, | The letter R is reserved for auto rickshaws. |
| DL-1RT, DL-1RTA and so on | The letter series RT is reserved for radio/app taxis. |
| DL −*S; SA - SZ; SAA... | The letter S is reserved for fuel powered/electric scooters and motorcycles. |
| DL-1T | The letter T is reserved for taxis. |
| DL-1V | The letter V is reserved for light buses. |
| DL-1W, DL-2W | The letter W is reserved for rural service share taxis. |
| DL-1Y | The letter Y is reserved for commercial private taxis. |
| DL-1Z | The letter Z is reserved for commercial private taxis. |
| DL-*CNA, CNB and so on, DL-*SNA, SNB and so on | These letter series are used for vehicles registered in sub-RTOs. These areas now have newer RTOs under which their records are now available. |

== GA—Goa ==
| Code | Office location | Jurisdiction area | Annotations |
|---|---|---|---|
| GA-01 | Panaji | North Goa district | Not in use |
| GA-02 | Margao | South Goa district | Not in use |
| GA-03 | Mapusa | Bardez taluka | |
| GA-04 | Bicholim | Bicholim taluka, Sattari taluka | |
| GA-05 | Ponda | Ponda taluka | |
| GA-06 | Vasco da Gama | Mormugao taluka | |
| GA-07 | Panaji | Tiswadi taluka | |
| GA-08 | Margao | Salcette taluka | |
| GA-09 | Quepem | Quepem taluka, Sanguem taluka | |
| GA-10 | Canacona | Canacona taluka | |
| GA-11 | Pernem | Pernem taluka | |
| GA-12 | Dharbandora | Dharbandora taluka | |

== GJ—Gujarat ==
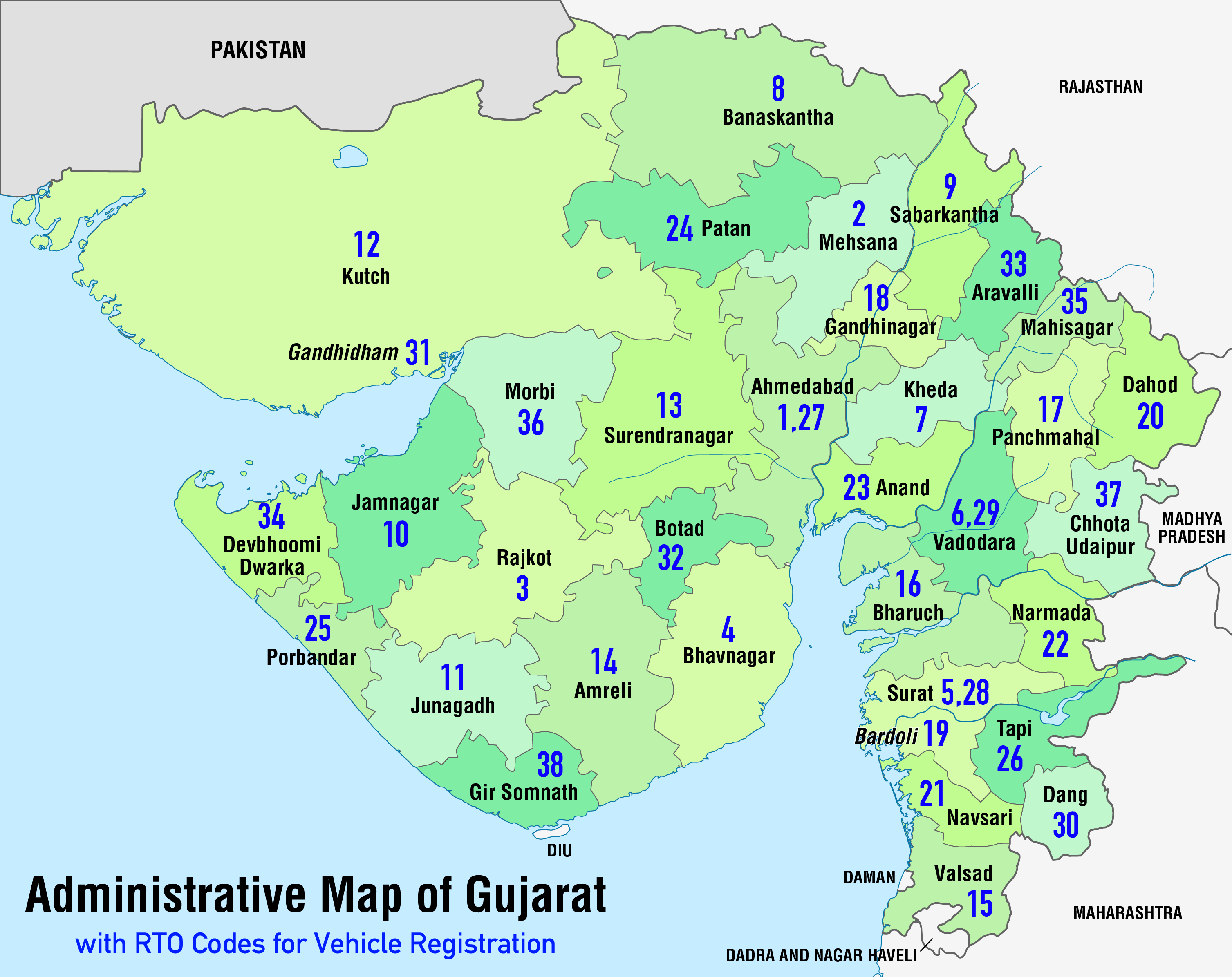
Administrative map of Gujarat with RTO codes for vehicle registration

| Code | Office location | Jurisdiction |
|---|---|---|
| GJ-01 | Ahmedabad (West), Subhash Bridge | Covers parts of Ahmedabad City on the western bank of the Sabarmati River, over Vejalpur, Sabarmati, Ghatlodiya and parts of Daskroi Taluks of Western Ahmedabad District |
| GJ-02 | Mehsana | Covers entire Mehsana District |
| GJ-03 | Rajkot | Covers entire Rajkot District |
| GJ-04 | Bhavnagar | Covers entire Bhavnagar District |
| GJ-05 | Surat | Covers Surat City, Olpad, Chorasi, Kamrej and Palsana Taluks of Western Surat District |
| GJ-06 | Vadodara | Covers entire Vadodara District |
| GJ-07 | Nadiad, Kheda District | Covers entire Kheda District |
| GJ-08 | Palanpur, Banaskantha District | Covers Banaskantha District and Vav-Tharad District |
| GJ-09 | Himmatnagar, Sabarkantha District | Covers entire Sabarkantha District |
| GJ-10 | Jamnagar | Covers entire Jamnagar District |
| GJ-11 | Junagadh | Covers entire Junagadh District |
| GJ-12 | Bhuj, Kutch District (West) | Covers Bhuj, Mundra, Mandvi, Nakhtarana, Abdasa and Lakhpat Taluks of Western Kutch District |
| GJ-13 | Surendranagar | Covers entire Surendranagar District |
| GJ-14 | Amreli | Covers entire Amreli District |
| GJ-15 | Valsad | Covers entire Valsad District |
| GJ-16 | Bharuch | Covers entire Bharuch District |
| GJ-17 | Godhra, Panchmahal District | Covers entire Panchmahal District |
| GJ-18 | Gandhinagar | Covers entire Gandhinagar District (Note: All GSRTC buses are registered here.) |
| GJ-19 | Bardoli, Surat District (East) | Covers Bardoli, Mahuva, Mandvi, Mangrol, Ambika, Areth and Umarpada Taluks of Eastern Surat District |
| GJ-20 | Dahod | Covers entire Dahod District |
| GJ-21 | Navsari | Covers entire Navsari District |
| GJ-22 | Rajpipla, Narmada District | Covers entire Narmada District |
| GJ-23 | Anand | Covers entire Anand District |
| GJ-24 | Patan | Covers entire Patan District |
| GJ-25 | Porbandar | Covers entire Porbandar District |
| GJ-26 | Vyara, Tapi District | Covers entire Tapi District |
| GJ-27 | Ahmedabad (East), Vastral | Covers parts of Ahmedabad City on the eastern bank of the Sabarmati River, over Maninagar, Asarwa, Vatva and parts of Daskroi Taluks of Eastern Ahmedabad District |
| GJ-28 | Not Allocated | Reserved for Surat |
| GJ-29 | Not Allocated | Reserved for Vadodara |
| GJ-30 | Ahwa, Dang District | Covers entire Dang District |
| GJ-31 | Modasa, Aravalli District | Covers entire Aravalli District |
| GJ-32 | Veraval, Gir Somnath District | Covers entire Gir Somnath District |
| GJ-33 | Botad | Covers entire Botad District |
| GJ-34 | Chhota Udaipur | Covers entire Chhota Udaipur District |
| GJ-35 | Lunawada, Mahisagar District | Covers entire Mahisagar District |
| GJ-36 | Morbi | Covers entire Morbi District |
| GJ-37 | Khambhaliya, Devbhoomi Dwarka District | Covers entire Devbhoomi Dwarka District |
| GJ-38 | Bavla, Ahmedabad District (Rural) | Covers Bavla, Sanand, Viramgam, Detroj-Rampura, Mandal, Dholka, Dhandhuka, Dholera and parts of Daskroi Taluks of Rural Ahmedabad District |
| GJ-39 | Anjar, Kutch District (East) | Covers Anjar, Gandhidham, Bhachau and Rapar Taluks of Eastern Kutch District |
| GJ-40 | Tharad | Covers Vav-Tharad District, reviously under GJ-08 (Palanpur) |

== HP—Himachal Pradesh ==
| Code | Office location | Jurisdiction area | Annotations |
|---|---|---|---|
| HP-01 & HP-02 | | Statewide (Tourist buses & Taxis) | |
| HP-03 | Shimla (Urban) | | |
| HP-04 | Kangra, Dharamsala | | |
| HP-05 | Mandi | | |
| HP-06 | Rampur Bushahr | | |
| HP-07 | Shimla (Urban) | | |
| HP-08 | Chaupal | | |
| HP-08AA | Kupvi | | |
| HP-09 | Theog | | |
| HP-10 | Rohru | | |
| HP-11 | Arki | | |
| HP-12 | Nalagarh | | |
| HP-12AA | Baddi | | |
| HP-13 | Kandaghat | | |
| HP-14 | Solan | | |
| HP-15 | Parwanoo | | |
| HP-16 | Rajgarh | | |
| HP-16AA | Pachhad, Sirmaur | | |
| HP-17 | Paonta Sahib | | |
| HP-18 | Nahan | | |
| HP-19 | Amb | | |
| HP-19AA | Gagret, Una | | |
| HP-20 | Una | | |
| HP-21 | Barsar, Hamirpur | | |
| HP-22 | Hamirpur | | |
| HP-23 | Ghumarwin | | |
| HP-24 | Bilaspur | | |
| HP-25 | Kalpa | | |
| HP-26 | Nichar, Bhaba Nagar | | |
| HP-27 | Pooh | | |
| HP-28 | Sarkaghat | | |
| HP-29 | Jogindernagar | | |
| HP-30 | Karsog | | |
| HP-31 | Sundernagar | | |
| HP-32 | Gohar, Mandi | | |
| HP-33 | Mandi | | |
| HP-33AA | Kotli | | |
| HP-34 | Kullu | | |
| HP-35 | Anni, Kullu | | |
| HP-35AA | Nirmand | | |
| HP-36 | Dehra | | |
| HP-37 | Palampur | | |
| HP-38 | Nurpur | | |
| HP-39 | Dharamshala | | |
| HP-40 | Kangra | | |
| HP-41 | Kaza | | |
| HP-42 | Keylong | | |
| HP-43 | Udaipur, Lahaul and Spiti | | |
| HP-44 | Churah, Chamba | | |
| HP-45 | Pangi | | |
| HP-46 | Bharmour | | |
| HP-47 | Dalhousie | | |
| HP-48 | Chamba | | |
| HP-49 | Banjar | | |
| HP-50 | Shimla | Auto-rickshaws | |
| HP-51 & HP-52 | Shimla (Rural) | | |
| HP-52AA | Sunni Shimla | | |
| HP-53 | Baijnath | | |
| HP-54 | Jawali | | |
| HP-55 | Nadaun | | |
| HP-56 | Jaisinghpur | | |
| HP-57 | Chowari | | |
| HP-58 | Manali | | |
| HP-59 | Solan | | |
| HP-60 | Hamirpur | | |
| HP-61 | Kullu | | |
| HP-62 | Shimla | | |
| HP-63 | Shimla | | |
| HP-64 | Solan | | |
| HP-65 | Mandi | | |
| HP-66 | Kullu | | |
| HP-67 | Hamirpur | | |
| HP-68 | Kangra, Dharmsala | | |
| HP-69 & HP-70 | Bilaspur | | |
| HP-71 | Nahan | | |
| HP-72 | Una | | |
| HP-73 | Chamba | | |
| HP-74 | Bhoranj, Hamirpur | | |
| HP-75 | Jubbal | | |
| HP-76 | Paddhar, Mandi | | |
| HP-77 | Dodra Kawar, Shimla | | |
| HP-78 | Bangana, Una | | |
| HP-79 | Sangrah, Sirmaur | | |
| HP-80 | Haroli, Una | | |
| HP-81 | Salooni | | |
| HP-82 | Balh, Mandi | | |
| HP-83 | Jawalaji, Kangra | | |
| HP-84 | Sujanpur Tihra, Hamirpur | | |
| HP-85 | Shillai, Sirmaur | | |
| HP-85AA | Kaffota, Sirmaur | | |
| HP-86 | Dharampur, Mandi | | |
| HP-87 | Janjehli, Mandi | | |
| HP-87AA | Bali Chowki, Mandi | | |
| HP-88 | Fatehpur, Kangra | | |
| HP-89 | Jhandutta, Bilaspur | | |
| HP-90 | Shahpur, Kangra | | |
| HP-91 | Naina Devi, Swarghat, Bilaspur | | |
| HP-92 | Rampur Bushahr | | |
| HP-93 | Nalagarh | | |
| HP-94 | Nagrota Bagwan | | |
| HP-95 | Kumarsain | | |
| HP-96 | Dheera, Kangra | | |
| HP-97 | Indora | | |
| HP-98 | Kasauli | | |
| HP-99 | Kotkhai | | |

== HR—Haryana ==
| Code | Office location | Jurisdiction area | Superordinate division | Annotations |
|---|---|---|---|---|
| HR-01 | Ambala | Ambala | Ambala district | |
| HR-02 | Jagadhari | Yamunanagar | Yamunanagar district | |
| HR-03 | Panchkula | Panchkula | Panchkula district | |
| HR-04 | Naraingarh | Naraingarh | Ambala district | |
| HR-05 | Karnal | Karnal | Karnal district | |
| HR-06 | Panipat | Panipat | Panipat district | |
| HR-07 | Thanesar | Thanesar | Kurukshetra district | |
| HR-08 | Kaithal | Kaithal | Kaithal district | |
| HR-09 | Guhla | Guhla | Kaithal district | |
| HR-10 | Sonipat | Sonipat | Sonipat district | |
| HR-11 | Gohana | Gohana | Sonipat district | |
| HR-12 | Rohtak | Rohtak | Rohtak district | |
| HR-13 | Bahadurgarh | Bahadurgarh | Jhajjar district | |
| HR-14 | Jhajjar | Jhajjar | Jhajjar district | |
| HR-15 | Meham | Meham | Rohtak district | |
| HR-16 | Bhiwani | Bhiwani | Bhiwani district | |
| HR-17 | Siwani | Siwani | Bhiwani district | |
| HR-18 | Loharu | Loharu | Bhiwani district | |
| HR-19 | Charkhi Dadri | Charkhi Dadri | Charkhi Dadri district | |
| HR-20 | Hisar | Hisar | Hisar district | |
| HR-21 | Hansi | Hansi | Hisar district | |
| HR-22 | Fatehabad | Fatehabad | Fatehabad district | |
| HR-23 | Tohana, Jakhal Mandi | Tohana | Fatehabad district | |
| HR-24 | Sirsa | Sirsa | Sirsa district | |
| HR-25 | Mandi Dabwali | Mandi Dabwali | Sirsa district | |
| HR-26 | Gurugram (Gurugram North) | Old Gurgaon City (Northern Parts) | Gurugram district | |
| HR-27 | Nuh | Nuh | Mewat district | |
| HR-28 | Ferozepur Jhirka | Ferozepur Jhirka | Mewat district | |
| HR-29 | Ballabgarh (Faridabad South) | Ballabgarh | Faridabad district | |
| HR-30 | Palwal | Palwal | Palwal district | |
| HR-31 | Jind | Jind | Jind district | |
| HR-32 | Narwana | Narwana | Jind district | |
| HR-33 | Safidon | Safidon | Jind district | |
| HR-34 | Mahendragarh | Mahendragarh | Mahendragarh district | |
| HR-35 | Narnaul | Narnaul | Mahendragarh district | |
| HR-36 | Rewari | Rewari | Rewari district | |
| HR-37 | Ambala | Ambala | Ambala district | commercial vehicles only |
| HR-38 | Faridabad | Faridabad district | Faridabad district | commercial vehicles only |
| HR-39 | Hisar | Hisar district | Hisar district | commercial vehicles only |
| HR-40 | Assandh | Assandh | Karnal district | |
| HR-41 | Pehowa | Pehowa | Kurukshetra district | |
| HR-42 | Ganaur | Ganaur | Sonipat district | |
| HR-43 | Kosli | Kosli | Rewari district | |
| HR-44 | Ellenabad | Ellenabad | Sirsa district | |
| HR-45 | Karnal | Karnal district | Karnal district | commercial vehicles only |
| HR-46 | Rohtak | Rohtak district | Rohtak district | commercial vehicles only |
| HR-47 | Rewari | Rewari district | Rewari district | commercial vehicles only |
| HR-48 | Tosham | Tosham, Bawani Khera | Bhiwani district | |
| HR-49 | Kalka | Kalka | Panchkula district | |
| HR-50 | Hodal | Hodal | Palwal district | |
| HR-51 | Faridabad (Faridabad North) | Faridabad | Faridabad district | |
| HR-52 | Hathin | Hathin | Palwal district | |
| HR-53 | Adampur | Adampur | Hisar district | |
| HR-54 | Barara | Barara | Ambala district | |
| HR-55 | Gurugram | Gurugram district | Gurugram district | commercial vehicles only |
| HR-56 | Jind | Jind, Julana | Jind district | commercial vehicles only |
| HR-57 | Sirsa | Sirsa district | Sirsa district | commercial vehicles only |
| HR-58 | Yamunanagar | Yamunanagar district | Yamunanagar district | commercial vehicles only |
| HR-59 | Ratia | Ratia | Fatehabad district | |
| HR-60 | Samalkha | Samalkha | Panipat district | |
| HR-61 | Bhiwani | Bhiwani district | Bhiwani district | commercial vehicles only |
| HR-62 | Fatehabad | Fatehabad district | Fatehabad district | commercial vehicles only |
| HR-63 | Jhajjar | Jhajjar, Bahadurgarh | Jhajjar district | commercial vehicles only |
| HR-64 | Kaithal | Kaithal district | Kaithal district | commercial vehicles only |
| HR-65 | Kurukshetra | Kurukshetra district | Kurukshetra district | commercial vehicles only |
| HR-66 | Narnaul | Mahendragarh district | Mahendragarh district | commercial vehicles only |
| HR-67 | Panipat | Panipat district | Panipat district | commercial vehicles only |
| HR-68 | Panchkula | Panchkula district | Panchkula district | commercial vehicles only |
| HR-69 | Sonipat | Sonipat district | Sonipat district | commercial vehicles only |
| HR-70 | Chandigarh | Chandigarh | | This series belongs to the Transport Commissioner in Chandigarh. It is meant for special out of turn VIP or special demand numbers. Also re-registered vehicles whose original number was from 1 to 100 (now retained by the original buyer for his new vehicle) or government auctioned vehicles and others are getting numbers from this series. |
| HR-71 | Bilaspur | Bilaspur | Yamunanagar district | |
| HR-72 | Sohna | Sohna | Gurugram district | |
| HR-73 | Palwal | Palwal district | Palwal district | commercial vehicles only |
| HR-74 | Nuh | Mewat district | Mewat district | commercial vehicles only |
| HR-75 | Indri | Indri | Karnal district | |
| HR-76 | Pataudi | Pataudi, Farrukhnagar | Gurugram district | |
| HR-77 | Beri | Beri | Jhajjar district | |
| HR-78 | Shahabad Markanda | Shahabad Markanda | Kurukshetra district | |
| HR-79 | Kharkhoda | Kharkhoda | Sonipat district | |
| HR-80 | Barwala | Barwala | Hisar district | |
| HR-81 | Bawal | Bawal | Rewari district | |
| HR-82 | Kanina | Kanina | Mahendragarh district | |
| HR-83 | Kalayat | Kalayat | Kaithal district | |
| HR-84 | Charkhi Dadri | Charkhi Dadri district | Charkhi Dadri district | commercial vehicles only |
| HR-85 | Ambala Cantt | Ambala Cantt | Ambala district | |
| HR-86 | Narnaund | Narnaund | Hisar district | |
| HR-87 | Badkhal (Faridabad West) | Badkhal Tehsil | Faridabad district | |
| HR-88 | Badhra | Badhra | Charkhi Dadri district | |
| HR-89 | Badli | Badli | Jhajjar district | |
| HR-90 | Uchana | Uchana | Jind district | |
| HR-91 | Gharaunda | Gharaunda | Karnal district | |
| HR-92 | Radaur | Radaur | Yamunanagar district | |
| HR-93 | Punhana | Punhana | Mewat district | |
| HR-94 | Kalanwali | Kalanwali | Sirsa district | |
| HR-95 | Sampla | Sampla | Rohtak district | |
| HR-96 | Taoru | Taoru | Mewat district | |
| HR-97 | Ladwa | Ladwa | Kurukshetra | |
| HR-98 | Badshahpur (Gurugram South) | New Gurgaon City (southern parts) including Badshahpur & Wazirabad | Gurugram district | |
| HR-99 | | entire Haryana | | Temporary numbers for new vehicles |

== JH—Jharkhand ==
| Code | Office location | Jurisdiction area | Annotations |
|---|---|---|---|
| JH-01 | Ranchi | Ranchi district | |
| JH-02 | Hazaribagh | Hazaribagh district | |
| JH-03 | Daltonganj | Palamu district | |
| JH-04 | Dumka | Dumka district | |
| JH-05 | Jamshedpur | East Singhbhum district | |
| JH-06 | Chaibasa | West Singhbhum district | |
| JH-07 | Gumla | Gumla district | |
| JH-08 | Lohardaga | Lohardaga district | |
| JH-09 | Bokaro | Bokaro district | |
| JH-10 | Dhanbad | Dhanbad district | |
| JH-11 | Giridih | Giridih district | |
| JH-12 | Koderma | Koderma district | |
| JH-13 | Chatra | Chatra district | |
| JH-14 | Garhwa | Garhwa district | |
| JH-15 | Deoghar | Deoghar district | |
| JH-16 | Pakur | Pakur district | |
| JH-17 | Godda | Godda district | |
| JH-18 | Sahibganj | Sahebganj district | |
| JH-19 | Latehar | Latehar district | |
| JH-20 | Simdega | Simdega district | |
| JH-21 | Jamtara | Jamtara district | |
| JH-22 | Seraikela Kharsawan | Seraikela Kharsawan district | |
| JH-23 | Khunti | Khunti district | |
| JH-24 | Ramgarh | Ramgarh district | |

== JK—Jammu and Kashmir ==
| Code | Office location | Jurisdiction area | Annotations |
|---|---|---|---|
| JK-01 | Srinagar | Srinagar District | |
| JK-02 | Jammu | Jammu District | |
| JK-03 | Anantnag | Anantnag District | |
| JK-04 | Budgam | Budgam District | |
| JK-05 | Baramulla | Baramulla District | |
| JK-06 | Doda | Doda District | |
| JK-08 | Lakhanpur, Kathua | Kathua District | |
| JK-09 | Kupwara | Kupwara District | |
| JK-11 | Rajouri | Rajouri District | |
| JK-12 | Poonch | Poonch district, India | |
| JK-13 | Pulwama | Pulwama District | |
| JK-14 | Udhampur | Udhampur District | |
| JK-15 | Bandipora | Bandipora District | |
| JK-16 | Ganderbal | Ganderbal District | |
| JK-17 | Kishtwar | Kishtwar District | |
| JK-18 | Kulgam | Kulgam District | |
| JK-19 | Ramban | Ramban District | |
| JK-20 | Reasi | Reasi District | |
| JK-21 | Samba | Samba District | |
| JK-22 | Shopian | Shopian District | |

== KA—Karnataka ==
| Code | Office location | Office address | Jurisdiction area | Annotations |
|---|---|---|---|---|
| KA-01 | Bengaluru Central, HSR Layout (Previously located in Koramangala) | 21st Main Road, Agara, HSR Layout 1st Sector, Bengaluru (KA), 560102 | Bengaluru Urban District | Covers Central Bengaluru |
| KA-02 | Bengaluru West, Rajajinagar | 12th Main Road, Rajajinagara 2nd Block, Bengaluru - 560010 | Bengaluru Urban District | Covers Western Bengaluru |
| KA-03 | Bengaluru East, Kasturinagar (Previously located in Indiranagar) | 3rd D Main Road, east of NGEF Layout, Kasturinagara, Bengaluru - 560016 | Bengaluru Urban District | Covers Eastern Bengaluru |
| KA-04 | Bengaluru North, Yeshwantpur | Subedarchatram Road, Dr. Ambedkar Nagara, Yeshwanthpura, Bengaluru - 560022 | Bengaluru Urban District | Covers Northern Bengaluru |
| KA-05 | Bengaluru South, Jayaprakash Nagara (Previously located in Jayanagar) | 3rd Main Road, Royal Park Residency Layout 2, Jayaprakash Nagara 9th Phase, Bengaluru - 560108 | Bengaluru Urban District | Covers Southern Bengaluru |
| KA-06 | Tumakuru | Bengaluru - Honnavara Road, Ashok Nagara, Tumakuru - 572103 | Tumakuru District | Covers Tumkur Town and Taluk, Kunigal and Gubbi Taluks |
| KA-07 | Kolar | Rahmat Nagara Main Road, Kanakanapalya, Kolar - 563101 | Kolar District | Covers Kolar Town and Taluk, Srinivasapura and Mulbagal Taluks |
| KA-08 | Kolar (KGF region) | DK Halli Main Road, Henry Colony, Kolar Gold Fields, Kolar District (KA) - 563120 | Kolar District | Covers K.G.F. Town, Bangarpet and Malur Taluks |
| KA-09 | Mysuru West | MG Road, Chamarajapura, Lakshmipura, Mysuru - 570004 | Mysuru District | Covers Western Mysuru City Suburbs, Western parts of Mysuru Taluk and Nanjangud Taluk |
| KA-10 | Chamarajanagar | Chamarajanagara Bypass Road, Mallayanapura, Chamarajanagara - 571313 | Chamarajanagara District | Covers entire Chamarajanagar District |
| KA-11 | Mandya | RTO Road, Subash Nagara, Mandya - 571401 | Mandya District | Covers Mandya Town and Taluk, Malavalli, Maddur, Srirangapatna and Pandavapura Taluks |
| KA-12 | Madikeri | Abbey Falls Road, Madikeri, Kodagu District (KA) - 571201 | Kodagu District | Covers entire Kodagu District |
| KA-13 | Hassan | Arsikere - Hassan Road, Sri Rama Nagara, Hassan - 573202 | Hassan District | Covers Hassan Town and Taluk, Arasikere, Holenarasipura, Channarayapatna and Arakalgud Taluks |
| KA-14 | Shivamogga | Savlanga Road, Basavanagudi, Shivamogga - 577201 | Shivamogga District | Covers Shivamogga Town and Taluk, Bhadravathi and Tirthahalli Taluks |
| KA-15 | Sagara | Ikkeri Road, Sagara, Shivamogga District (KA) - 577401 | Shivamogga District | Covers Sagara Town and Taluk, Soraba, Shikaripura, and Hosanagar Taluks |
| KA-16 | Chitradurga | NH Service Road, Maniyuru, Chitradurga - 577501 | Chitradurga District | Covers entire Chitradurga District |
| KA-17 | Davanagere | Kondajji Road, Devaraj Urs Layout B Block, Davanagere - 577004 | Davanagere District | Covers entire Davanagere District |
| KA-18 | Chikkamagaluru | KM Road, Chikkamagaluru - 577101 | Chikkamagaluru District | Covers Chikkamagaluru, Mudigere, Sringeri as well as parts of Narsimharaja and Koppa Taluks |
| KA-19 | Mangaluru | Maidan Road, Attavara, Mangaluru, Dakshina Kannada District (KA) - 575001 | Dakshina Kannada District | Covers Mangaluru City and Taluk |
| KA-20 | Udupi | Dr. VS Acharya Road, Saralebettu, Manipal, Udupi District (KA) - 576104 | Udupi District | Covers entire Udupi District |
| KA-21 | Puttur | RTO Road, Bannur, Puttur, Dakshina Kannada District (KA) - 574203 | Dakshina Kannada District | Covers Puttur and Sullia Taluks |
| KA-22 | Belagavi | Bachi - Raichur Road, Khade Bazar, Raviwar Peth, Belagavi - 590016 | Belagavi District | Covers Belgaum Town and Taluk and Khanapur Taluk |
| KA-23 | Chikkodi | Nippani Road, Chikkodi, Belagavi District (KA) - 591201 | Belagavi District | Covers Chikkodi, and parts of Hukkeri and Raibag Taluks |
| KA-24 | Bailhongal | Devalapura Road, Bailhongal, Belagavi District (KA) - 591102 | Belagavi District | Covers Bailhongal, Kittur and parts of Saundatti Taluk |
| KA-25 | Dharwad | Hubballi - Dharwad Road, Navanagara, Hubballi, Dharwad District (KA) - 580025 | Dharwad District | Covers Northern suburbs of Hubli-Dharwad City, Dharwad and parts of Navalgund and Kalghatgi Taluks |
| KA-26 | Gadag | Mulgund Road, Malasamudra, Gadag - 582103 | Gadag District | Covers entire Gadag District |
| KA-27 | Haveri | PB Road, Haveri - 581110 | Haveri District | Covers Haveri Town and Taluk, Hanagal, Shiggaon and Savanoor |
| KA-28 | Vijayapura | Bagalkote Road, Bammanajogi, Vijayapura - 586109 | Vijayapura District | Covers entire Vijayapura District |
| KA-29 | Bagalkote | Navanagara Bypass Road, Vidyagiri, Bagalkote - 587103 | Bagalkote District | Covers Bagalkot Town and Taluk, Hunagund, Bilagi and Badami Taluks |
| KA-30 | Karwar | Bypass Road, Kodibag, Karwar, Uttara Kannada District (KA) - 581301 | Uttara Kannada District | Covers Karwar Town and Taluk, Ankola and parts of Supa Taluks |
| KA-31 | Sirsi | Bashettikere Road, Basaveshwara Nagara, Sirsi, Uttara Kannada District (KA) - 581402 | Uttara Kannada District | Covers Sirsi, Siddapura, Yellapura, and Mundagod Taluks |
| KA-32 | Kalaburagi | Sedam Road, Badepura Colony, Kalaburagi - 585101 | Kalaburagi District | Covers entire Kalaburagi District |
| KA-33 | Yadgir | Yadgir - Chittapura Road, Yadgir - 585202 | Yadgir District | Covers entire Yadgir District |
| KA-34 | Ballari | Old Trunk Road, Cantonment, Ballari - 583104 | Ballari District | Covers entire Ballari District |
| KA-35 | Hosapete | Hosapete - Harihara Road, Vivekananda Nagara, Hosapete, Vijayanagara District (KA) - 583201 | Vijayanagara District | Covers entire Vijayanagara District |
| KA-36 | Raichur | Mantralayam Road, Ashok Nagara, Raichur - 584103 | Raichur District | Covers entire Raichur District |
| KA-37 | Koppal | Ballari - Hubballi Road, Kidadhal, Koppal - 583231 | Koppal District | Covers entire Koppal District |
| KA-38 | Bidar | Naubad Road, Naubad, Bidar - 585402 | Bidar District | Covers Bidar Town and Taluk, as well as Aurad Taluk |
| KA-39 | Bhalki | Udgir - Bidar Road, Gunj, Bhalki, Bidar District (KA) - 585328 | Bidar District | Covers Bhalki and Humnabad Taluks |
| KA-40 | Chikkaballapura | Chitravathi Road, Honnenahalli, Chikkaballapura - 562101 | Chikkaballapura District | Covers Chikkaballapura Town and Taluk, Gauribidanur, Gudibande and parts of Sidlaghatta and Bagepalli Taluks |
| KA-41 | Jnana Bharathi (Bengaluru Western Suburbs) | Ullal Main Road, Jnana Bharathi, Ullal, Bengaluru - 560091 | Bengaluru Urban District | Covers Greater Bengaluru's western suburbs |
| KA-42 | Ramanagara | Mysuru Road, Vijayanagara, Ramanagara - 562159 | Ramanagara District | Covers entire Ramanagara District |
| KA-43 | Devanahalli | Nandi Hills Road, Kurubarakunte, Devanahalli, Bengaluru Rural District (KA) - 562110 | Bengaluru Rural District | Covers Devanahalli and Doddaballapura Taluks |
| KA-44 | Tiptur | Halepalya Road, Krishnaraja Extension, Tiptur, Tumakuru District (KA) - 572201 | Tumakuru District | Covers Tiptur, Turuvekere and Chikkanayakanahalli Taluks |
| KA-45 | Hunsur | RTO Road, Housing Board Colony, Hunsur, Mysuru District (KA) - 571105 | Mysuru District | Covers Hunsur, Piriyapatna, H.D. Kote and K.R. Nagar Taluks |
| KA-46 | Sakleshpura, Hassan District | Bengaluru - Mangaluru Road, Kollahalli, Sakleshpura, Hassan District (KA) - 573127 | Hassan District | Covers Sakleshpura, Alur and Belur Taluks |
| KA-47 | Honnavar, Uttara Kannada District | Honnavar - Areangadi Road, Rama Tirtha, Honnavar, Uttara Kannada District (KA) - 581341 | Uttara Kannada District | Covers Honnavara, Bhatkal and Kumta Taluks |
| KA-48 | Jamkhandi, Bagalkote District | Mudhol Road, Jamakhandi, Bagalkote District (KA) - 587301 | Bagalkote District | Covers Jamkhandi and Mudhol Taluks |
| KA-49 | Gokak, Belagavi District | Gokak Main Road, Gokak, Belagavi District (KA) - 591307 | Belagavi District | Covers Gokak and parts of Hukkeri Taluk |
| KA-50 | Yelahanka, Bengaluru (Bengaluru Northern Suburbs) | Singanayakanahalli Road, Singanayakanahalli, Yelahanka, Bengaluru - 560064 | Bengaluru Urban District | Covers Bengaluru's northern suburbs |
| KA-51 | Electronic City, Bengaluru (Bengaluru Southern Suburbs) | 5th Main Road, BTM Layout 4th Stage, Bengaluru - 560076 | Bengaluru Urban District | Covers Bengaluru's southern suburbs |
| KA-52 | Nelamangala, Bengaluru Rural District | Rahuthnahalli Main Road, Harokyathanahalli, Nelamangala, Bengaluru Rural District (KA) - 562162 | Bengaluru Rural District | Covers Nelamangala Taluk |
| KA-53 | Krishnarajapuram, Bengaluru (Bengaluru Eastern Suburbs) | Old Madras Road, Hosabasavanapura, Krishnarajapuram, Bengaluru - 560049 | Bengaluru Urban District and parts of Bengaluru Rural District | Covers Bengaluru's eastern suburbs and Hoskote Taluk in Bengaluru Rural District |
| KA-54 | Nagamangala, Mandya District | Basaveshwara Nagara Road, Nagamangala, Mandya District (KA) - 571432 | Mandya District | Covers Nagamangala & K.R. Pet Taluks |
| KA-55 | Mysuru East | Mysuru Ring Road, Hale Kesare, Mysuru - 570019 | Mysuru District | Covers Eastern Mysuru Suburbs, Eastern parts of Mysuru Taluk and T. Narasipura Taluk |
| KA-56 | Basavakalyan, Bidar District | Basavakalyan Main Road, Morkhandi, Basavakalyan, Bidar District (KA) - 585327 | Bidar District | Covers Basavakalyana Taluk |
| KA-57 | Shantinagara, KSRTC and BMTC buses | BMTC Depot Road, Shanthinagara, Bengaluru - 560027 | Bengaluru Urban District | Only for "KA-57 F" series exclusively for KSRTC and BMTC buses. Autorickshaw permits are also available here, although registration has to be done from Bengaluru's other RTOs. |
| KA-59 | Chandapura, Bengaluru Urban District | Anekal Road, Byagadadenahalli, Chandapura, Bengaluru Urban District (KA) - 562107 | Bengaluru Urban District | Covers Anekal Taluk, including Kudlu Ward of Bengaluru South City Corporation, which is the only ward within the Greater Bengaluru Area under this RTO. |
| KA-63 | Dharwad East | Hubballi - Dharwad Road, Gabbur, Hubballi, Dharwad District (KA) - 580028 | Dharwad District | Covers Southern suburbs of Hubli-Dharwad City, Hubli, Kundgol and parts of Navalgund and Kalghatgi Taluks |
| KA-64 | Madhugiri, Tumkur District | Gauribidanuru Road, Madhugiri, Tumakuru District (KA) - 572132 | Tumakuru District | Covers Madhugiri, Sira, Koratagere and Pavagada Taluks |
| KA-65 | Dandeli, Uttara Kannada District | DFA Road, Dandeli, Uttara Kannada District (KA) - 581325 | Uttara Kannada District | Covers Dandeli, Supa and Haliyal Taluks |
| KA-66 | Tarikere, Chikkamagaluru District | Bengaluru - Shivamogga Road, Tarikere, Chikkamagaluru District (KA) - 577228 | Chikkamagaluru District | Covers Tarikere, Kadur as well as parts of Narsimharaja and Koppa Taluks |
| KA-67 | Chintamani, Chikkaballapura District | Hosakote - Chintamani Road, Kanampalli Layout, Chintamani, Chikkaballapura District (KA) - 563125 | Chikkaballapura District | Covers Chintamani and parts of Sidlaghatta and Bagepalli Taluks |
| KA-68 | Ranebennur, Haveri District | PB Road, Sangolli Rayanna Nagara, Ranebennuru, Haveri District (KA) - 581115 | Haveri District | Covers Ranebennur Town and Taluk, Hirekerur and Byadagi Taluks |
| KA-69 | Ramdurg, Belagavi District | Belagavi Road, Radhapurapete, Ramdurga, Belagavi District (KA) - 591123 | Belagavi District | Covers Ramdurg and parts of Saundatti Taluks |
| KA-70 | Bantwal, Dakshina Kannada District | Bengaluru - Mangaluru Road, Melkar, Bantwal, Dakshina Kannada District (KA) - 574231 | Dakshina Kannada District | Covers Bantwal and Belthangady Taluks |
| KA-71 | Athani, Belagavi District | Gokak Road, Haluvalli, Athani, Belagavi District (KA) - 591304 | Belagavi District | Covers Athnani and Raibag taluks |

Specifics in the KA series
| Alphabets | Meaning |
|---|---|
| (No alphabet) Example: KA 09 2418 | This series is reserved for all types of commercial vehicles. (Yellow Board) |
| A, B, C, D | These four letters are reserved for all types of commercial vehicles. (Yellow Board) |
| E, H, J, K, L, Q, R, S, U, V, W, X, Y | These letters are reserved for private two wheelers. |
| F, FA | The letter F is reserved for KSRTC, KKRTC, NWKRTC and BMTC buses. |
| G | The letter G is reserved for all Karnataka government vehicles including police vehicles, ambulances, legislative assembly vehicles, municipal corporation vehicles, etc. |
| M, N, P, Z | These letters are reserved for private passenger vehicles. Excavators, bulldozers and boring rigs also use these registrations. |
| T | The letter T is reserved for tractors and trailers. |
| I, O | These two letters are not offered as they can lead to confusion with 1 (one) and 0 (zero). |

== KL—Kerala ==
| Code | Office location | Jurisdiction area | Annotations |
|---|---|---|---|
| KL-01 | Thiruvananthapuram | Thiruvananthapuram Corporation wards 12-101, Kalliyoor | Most Kerala Government vehicles, including Police are registered here. |
| KL-02 | Kollam | Kollam Municipal Corporation, Paravur, Adichanalloor, Chathannoor, Chirakkara, Elampalloor, Kalluvathukkal, Kottamkara, Kundara, Mayyanad, Munroe Island, Nedumpana, Panayam, Perayam, Perinad, Poothakkulam, Thrikkaruva, Thrikkovilvattom | |
| KL-03 | Pathanamthitta | Pathanamthitta Town, Kaipattoor, Omallur, Malayalapuzha, Mylapra, Naranganam, Sabarigiri, Aranmula, Kozhencherri | |
| KL-04 | Alappuzha | Alappuzha Town, Ambalappuzha, Aryad, Komalapuram, Kommadi, Polathai, Thumboli, Punnapra, Kalavur, Ananthanarayanapuram | |
| KL-05 | Kottayam | Kottayam Town, Kodimatha, Manarcaud, Pampady, Tirunnakara, Nattakom, Tiruvarppu, Tiruvathikkal, Sankranthi, Vijayapuram, Pallickathodu, Ettumanoor | |
| KL-06 | Idukki | Idukki Twp, Painavu | |
| KL-07 | Kochi, Ernakulam District. | Areas of Greater Kochi covered by the Kochi Municipal Corporation, Kalamassery Municipality, Infopark Phase 2, Thrikkakara Municipality, Cheranallur Grama Panchayat | Covers parts of Greater Kochi, including those outside Kochi Corporation limits |
| KL-08 | Thrissur | Thrissur Corporation, Pananchery, Cherpu, Paralam, Kolazhy, Nadathara, Madakkathara, Adat, Avinissery, Avanur, Mulamkunnathukavu | |
| KL-09 | Palakkad | Palakkad municipality,Parli,Pirayiri,Kongad,Mankara,Mundur,Malampuzha,Puduppariyaram,Keralasseri Grama Panchayat areas | |
| KL-10 | Malappuram (part of Ernad, Perintalmanna & Tirur Taluks) | Malappuram, Manjeri, Anakkayam, Pookkoottor, Kavanur, Pulpetta, Edavanna, Pandikkad, Thrikkalangode, Koottilangadi, Kodur, Ponmala | |
| KL-11 | Kozhikode | Kozhikode Municipal Corporation, Feroke, Ramanattukara, Chathamangalam, Chelannur, Kadalundi, Kakkodi, Kakkur, Karassery, Kunnamangalam, Kuruvattur, Mavoor, Mukkam, Nanmanda, Olavanna, Perumanna, Peruvayal, Thalakulathur, | |
| KL-12 | Kalpetta, Wayanad District | Kalpetta Township, Chitragiri, Vythiri | |
| KL-13 | Kannur | Kannur Municipal Corporation limits, Valapattanam, Papinnisheri, Kannapuram, Dharmadam, Parashinikadavu | |
| KL-14 | Kasaragod | Kasaragod, Chandragiri, Manjeshwaram, Uppala, Mogral Puttur, Kumbla | |
| KL-15 | Nationalised Sector I, Thiruvananthapuram | Used exclusively for KSRTC and KURTC buses | Kerala State Road Transport Corporation |
| KL-16 | Attingal, Thiruvananthapuram District | Chirayinkeezhu Taluk | |
| KL-17 | Muvattupuzha, Ernakulam District | Muvattupuzha, Vazhakulam, Koothattukulam, Piravom | |
| KL-18 | Vadakara, Kozhikode District | Vadakara, Nadapuram | |
| KL-19 | Parassala, Thiruvananthapuram District | Padmanabhapuram, Tiruvattar, Tiruparappu, Kulasekaram, Amaravilla, Dhanuvachapuram, Marthandam Poovaar | |
| KL-20 | Neyyattinkara, Thiruvananthapuram District | Neyyattinkara, Balaramapuram, Vedivachankovil, Pravachambalam, Pallichal | |
| KL-21 | Nedumangad, Thiruvananthapuram District | Nedumangad, Arruvikara, Bhartheeswaram, Palode, Vithura, Ponmudi, Karakulam, Perrorkada | |
| KL-22 | Kazhakkoottam, Thiruvananthapuram | Thiruvananthapuram Corporation, Thiruvananthapuram Taluk Northern Areas (Andoorkonam, Kadinamkulam, Mangalapuram, Pothencode Panchayats) | |
| KL-23 | Karunagappalli, Kollam District | Karunagapalli, Oachira, Mynagapalli, Chavara, Amrithapuri, Thazhava, Paavumba | |
| KL-24 | Kottarakkara, Kollam District | Kottarakara, Malanada, Enathu, Pavitreeswaram, Chengamanad. Mavadi | |
| KL-25 | Punalur, Kollam District | Punalur, Thenmala, Aryankavu, Bhagavathipuram, Anchal, Kulathuppuzha, Achankovil | |
| KL-26 | Adoor, Pathanamthitta District | Adoor Taluk | |
| KL-27 | Tiruvalla, Pathanamthitta District | Tiruvalla, Tirumoolapuram, Othera, Manjadi, Parumala, Valanjavattom | |
| KL-28 | Mallappally, Pathanamthitta District | Mallappally, Kaviyoor | |
| KL-29 | Kayamkulam, Alappuzha District | Karthikapalli, Kayankulam Town, Krishnapuram, Harippad, Shaktipuram, Karuvatta, Manarssala | |
| KL-30 | Chengannur, Alappuzha District | Chengannur, Cheriyanad, Budhannur, Pandanad, Venmani-kalyathra | |
| KL-31 | Mavelikkara, Alappuzha District | Mavelikara, Chettikulangara, Kattanam, Mannar, Charummod, Adhikattukulangara, Aakanattukara, Vallikonam, Vathukonam, Vettiyar | |
| KL-32 | Cherthala, Alappuzha District | Cherthala, Tiruvizha, Pattanakkad, Vayalar, Turavur, Aroor, Eramalloor, Varanad, Mannancherry, Panavally, Varanam | |
| KL-33 | Changanassery, Kottayam District | Changanassery, Nalukodi, Kurichi, Chingavanam, Karukachal, Perunna, Vazhoor, Kangazha, Vellavoor | |
| KL-34 | Kanjirapalli, Kottayam District | Kanjirapalli, Erumelli, Mundakayam, Ponkunnam, Chirrakadavu, Anchillappa, Anakkal, Koottickal | |
| KL-35 | Pala, Kottayam District | Meenachil, Erattupetta, Poonjar, Bharananganam, Kadanad, Kidangoor, Mutholi, Poovarani, Melukavu, Thalanad, Teekoi, Moonnilavu, Thalappulam, Thidanad | |
| KL-36 | Vaikom, Kottayam District | Vaikom, Talayolaparambu, Udayanapuram, Vadayar, Kaduthuruthi, Vechoor | |
| KL-37 | Vandiperiyar, Idukki District | Peerumed, Elappara, Kuttikanam, Vandiperiyar, Kumili, Kattappana, Kambammedu, Mangaladevi | |
| KL-38 | Thodupuzha, Idukki District | Thodupuzha, Kumaramangalam .Vengannur, Muttum, Uravvappara, Malankara, Moolamattam | |
| KL-39 | Thripunithura, Ernakulam District | Thripunithura, Udayamperoor, Cheppanam-Chattamma, Kanjiramattom, Mulanthuruthy, Chottanikkara | Covers parts of Greater Kochi outside Kochi Corporation limits |
| KL-40 | Perumbavoor, Ernakulam District | Kunnathunad, Nellad, Valayanchirangara, Chellamattom, Thottuva, Rayamangalam, Pattimattam | |
| KL-41 | Aluva, Ernakulam District | Aluva Municipality limits, Edathala Grama Panchayat limits, Vazhakulam Grama Panchayat, Choornikkara Grama Panchayat | Covers parts of Greater Kochi outside Kochi Corporation limits |
| KL-42 | North Paravur, Ernakulam District | North Paravur, Munambam, Cherrai, Vypin, Puthuvype | Covers parts of Greater Kochi outside Kochi Corporation limits |
| KL-43 | Fort Kochi & Mattancherry, Ernakulam District | Kochi Corporation Area, Pallurthi, Kumbalangi | Covers parts of Greater Kochi, including those outside Kochi Corporation limits |
| KL-44 | Kothamangalam, Ernakulam District | Kothamangalam Taluk, Odakkali, Neriyamangalam, Bhootathankettu | |
| KL-45 | Irinjalakuda, Thrissur District | Mukundapuram Taluk, Ashtamichira, Annammanada, Mala, Cherppu, Kandassamkadavu | |
| KL-46 | Guruvayur, Thrissur District | Guruvayur Taluk, Chhavakad, Chettuva, Pavaratti | |
| KL-47 | Kodungallur, Thrissur District | Kodungallur, Methala, Sringapuram | |
| KL-48 | Wadakkancherry, Thrissur District | Wadakkancherry, Thiruvilwamala, Pazhayannur, Chelakkara, Anthimahal, Uthralikavu, Mulangunathukavu, Deshamangalam, Chittada, Malakha, Akamalavaram | |
| KL-49 | Alathur, Palakkad District | Alathur, Vadakkenchery, Kavassery, Kuzhalmannam, Thenkurissi, Kottayi, Mathur, Peringottukurissi | |
| KL-50 | Mannarkkad, Palakkad District | Mannarkkad municipality, Attappady Taluk comprising Agali,Pudur and Sholaiyur Panchayats,Karimba, Kanhirappuzha,Thachampara,Kumarampathur,Kottopadam,Alanellur,Thachanattukara,Thenkara,Karakurissy Panchayats. | |
| KL-51 | Ottapalam, Palakkad District | Ottapalam and Shoranur Municipalities, Ambalapara,Cherpulasseri municipality,Sreekrishnapuram,Karimpuzha,Pookkottukave,Trikkaderi,Katambazhipuram,Karimpuzha,Ananganadi,Vaniyamkulam and Chalavara Grama Panchayats of Ottapalam Taluk. | |
| KL-52 | Pattambi, Palakkad District | Pattambi Municipality, Thrithala, Nagalassery, Vallapuzha, Koppam,Vilayur,Tiruvegappura,Paruthur,Thirumittakode,Pattithara,Chalissery,Muthuthala,Kulukkallur and Ongallur Grama Panchayats. | |
| KL-53 | Perinthalmanna, Malappuram District | Perinthalmanna, Edappatta, Keezhattur, Aliparamba, Elamkulam, Thazhekode, Vettathur, Pulamanthole, Melattur, Angadippuram, Kuruva, Mankada, Puzhakkattiri, Moorkkanad, Makkaraparamba | |
| KL-54 | Ponnani, Malappuram District | Ponnani, Edappal, Alankode, Marancheri, Nannammukku, Perumpadappu, Veliynakode, Thavanur, Kaladi, Vattamkulam | |
| KL-55 | Tirur, Malappuram District | Tirur, Tirunnavaya, Tanur, Valancheri, Kalapancheri, Valavannur, Vettam, Thalakkad, Athavanad, Ponmundam, Cheriyamundam, Ozhur, Nirmaruthur, Thanalur, Edayur, Irimbiliyma, Marakkara, Kuttippuram, Purathur, Mangalam, Thrippangode | |
| KL-56 | Koyilandy, Kozhikode District | Koyilandy, Payyoli, Chemancheri | |
| KL-57 | Koduvally, Kozhikode District | Mukkam, Kunnamangalam, Koduvally, Thamarasseri, Elettiyil, Vattoli, Mavoor, Thiruvambadi, Kattangal | |
| KL-58 | Thalassery, Kannur District | Thalassery, Anjarakandy, Koothuparamba, Gopalpet, Chokli, Pinarayi, Pathirayad, Sivapuram | |
| KL-59 | Taliparamba, Kannur District | Taliparamba, Sreekandapuram, Alakkode, Karthikapuram, Payyavoor, Irikkur, Chemperi, Mayyil | |
| KL-60 | Kanhangad, Kasargod District | Hosdurg, Balla, Nileshwaram, Trikkarippur, Cheruvathur | |
| KL-61 | Kunnathur, Kollam District | Sasthamkotta, Bharanikkavu, Kallada, Anayadi | |
| KL-62 | Ranni, Pathanamthitta District | Ranni Perinad, Kuravamoozhi, Mandamaruthi | |
| KL-63 | Angamaly, Ernakulam District | Angamaly, Karukutti, Tirumoozhikulam, Malayathur, Kodannad, Yordhanapuram | |
| KL-64 | Chalakkudy, Thrissur District | Chalakkudy, Athirapalli, Malakkapara, Poringu, Potta, Kodakara | |
| KL-65 | Tirurangadi, Malappuram District | Tirurangadi, Thenhipalam, Parappanangadi, Kottakkal, Edarikode, Parappur, Othukkungal, Oorakam, Vengara, Kannamangalam, Peruvalloore, AR Nagar, Perumanna Klari, Thennala, Nannambra, Moonniyur, Vallikkunnu | Covers the entirety of Tirurangadi taluk & parts of Tirur taluk |
| KL-66 | Kuttanad, Alappuzha District | Champakulam, Kainakari, Puthukari, Mithrakari, Ramankari, Champakulam, Thayankary, Nedumudi, Takazhi, Vezhapra, Edathua, Thalavadi, Mancompu, Pulincunnoo, Koduppunna, Kavalam, Neelamperoor, Veliyanad, Veeyapuram, Muttar, Chennamkary, Kidangara | |
| KL-67 | Uzhavoor, Kottayam District | Uzhavur, Ramapuram, Njeezhoor, Kuravilangad, Monipalli, Aandoor, Kuruppanthara | |
| KL-68 | Devikulam, Idukki District | Devikulam, Munnar, Marayur, Chinnar, Boddimettu, Mattupetti, Vatavada, Kanthaloor, Chinnakanal | |
| KL-69 | Udumbanchola, Idukki District | Udumbancholla, Nedumkandam, Rajakumari, Rajakkad, Bison Valley, Chithirapuram, Vellathooval | |
| KL-70 | Chittur, Palakkad District | Chittur-Thathamangalam Municipality,Meenakshipuram, Gopalapuram, Govindapuram, Kollengode, Koduvayur, Pudunagaram, Nenmara, Neliyampathy areas of Chittur Taluk | |
| KL-71 | Nilambur, Malappuram District | Nilambur, Wandoor, Chaliyar, Vazhikkadavu, Edakakra, Pothukkallu, Chungathara, Mothedam, Amarambalam, Karulai, Thiruvali, Mampad, Porur, Kalikavu, Chokkad, Karuvarakundu, Thuvvoor | |
| KL-72 | Mananthavady, Wayanad District | Manathawadi, Ambalavayal, Kottiyur, Tirunelli, Tholpetti, Bramhagiri | |
| KL-73 | Sulthan Bathery, Wayanad District | Sulthan Bathery, Muthanga, Meenangadi | |
| KL-74 | Kattakada, Thiruvananthapuram District | Kattakada, Malayankeezh, Vilappil, Otasekharamangalam, Amboori, Vellarda, Vilvoorkal | |
| KL-75 | Thriprayar, Thrissur District | Thriprayyar, Vadannapalli, Valappad, Nattikka | |
| KL-76 | Nanmanda, Kozhikode District | Balusseri, Atholli, Chelannur, Kakkodi, Kuruvattur | |
| KL-77 | Perambra, Kozhikode District | Perambra, Kuttiyadi | |
| KL-78 | Iritty, Kannur District | Iritty, Padiyoor, Ulikkal, Aralam, Payam, Ayyankunnu, Mattannur, Peravoor, Kottiyoor, Kelakam, Kanichar, Muzhakkunnu, Thillenkery | |
| KL-79 | Vellarikundu, Kasargod District | Vellarikundu, Chittarikkal, Rajapuram, Ranipuram, Bandadukka, Cheruppuzha, Parappa, Konnakkad, Bovikanam | |
| KL-80 | Pathanapuram, Kollam District | Pathanapuram, Manchaloor, Pattazhi, Pakalkuri, Avaneeswaram | |
| KL-81 | Varkala, Thiruvananthapuram District | Varkala, Sivagiri, Anchuthengu, Edavai | |
| KL-82 | Chadayamangalam, Kollam District | Chadayamangalam, Elamadu, Velinallur, Ittiva, Kottukkal, Nilamel, Kadakkal, Chithara, Mankode, Kummil | |
| KL-83 | Konni, Pathanamthitta District | Konni, Koodal-Rajagiri, Gavi | |
| KL-84 | Kondotty, Malappuram District | Karippur, Kondotty, Pallikkal, Chelembra, Kuzhimanna, Cherukavu, Muthuvallore, Vazhayur, Vazhakkad, Pulikkal, Chekkode, Morayur, Keezhuparmab, Areekode, Orgnatteeri | Covers the entirety of Kondotty taluk & parts of Eranad taluk |
| KL-85 | Ramanattukara-Feroke, Kozhikode District | Feroke, Ramanattukara, Kadalundi Beypore, Nallalam, Olavanna, Perumanna | |
| KL-86 | Payyannur, Kannur District | Payyannur, Ramanthali, Cherupuzha, Peringome, Kankole, Kadannappally-Panapuzha, Eramam-Kuttoor, Karivellur | |
| KL-90 | Nationalised Sector II Thiruvananthapuram | Used exclusively for Government Vehicle's | KL-90A: Kerala Government, KL-90B: Central Government, KL-90C: Local body, KL-90D: Public sector undertakings |
| KL-99 | Thiruvananthapuram | Used exclusively for State Transport Authority vehicles | Limited in circulation |

== LA—Ladakh ==
| Code | Office location | Jurisdiction | Annotations |
|---|---|---|---|
| LA-01 | Kargil | Kargil district | Previously JK-07 |
| LA-01 | Padum | Zanskar district | still now |
| LA-01 | Dras | Drass district | still now |
| LA-02 | Leh | Leh district | Previously JK-10 |
| LA-02 | Nyoma | Changthang district | still now |
| LA-02 | Diskit | Nubra district | still now |
| LA-02 | Khalatse | Sham district | still now |

== LD—Lakshadweep ==
| Code | Office location | Jurisdiction area | Annotations |
|---|---|---|---|
| LD-01 | Kavaratti | Kavaratti | |
| LD-02 | Agatti | Agatti | |
| LD-03 | Amini | Amini | |
| LD-04 | Androth | Androth | |
| LD-05 | Kadmat | Kadmat | |
| LD-06 | Kiltan | Kiltan | |
| LD-07 | Kalpeni | Kalpeni | |
| LD-08 | Kalpeni | Kalpeni | |
| LD-09 | Minicoy | Minicoy | |

== MH—Maharashtra ==
| Code | Location | Office location | Jurisdiction area | Annotations |
|---|---|---|---|---|
| MH-01 | Mumbai Central (Tardeo) | Location: Tardeo, Mumbai City district | Jurisdiction: Nariman Point, Colaba to Mahim, Sion, Wadala in Mumbai City district, Kurla (parts) in Mumbai Suburban district and Elephanta (Raigad district) | BEST buses (BMC Owned), BMC, Government vehicles serving Mumbai jurisdiction are also registered here. |
| MH-02 | Mumbai West (Andheri) | Location: Versova Road, Andheri (W), Mumbai Suburban district | Jurisdiction: Bandra to Jogeshwari in Mumbai Suburban district | This RTO also included the northern suburbs of Goregaon to Dahisar until 2015, after which they came under the jurisdiction of the MH47 RTO |
| MH-03 | Mumbai East (Wadala) | Location: Wadala Truck Terminal, Mumbai City district | Jurisdiction: Kurla to Mulund, Mankhurd in Mumbai Suburban district | |
| MH-04 | Thane | Location: near Central Jail, Thane | Jurisdiction: Talukas of Thane, Bhiwandi and Shahapur | This RTO also covered present-day Palghar district until 2014 |
| MH-05 | Kalyan | Location: Sahyadri Nagar, Kalyan West, Thane district | Jurisdiction: Talukas of Kalyan (Kalyan-Dombivli), Murbad, Ulhasnagar (Town and Taluka), Ambernath (Town and Taluka, including Badlapur Town) | |
| MH-06 | Raigad | Location: Utkarsh Nagar, Pen (Town and Taluka) | Jurisdiction: Taluks of Pen, Alibag, Roha, Murud, Shrivardhan, Mangaon, Mhasala, Poladpur, Tala, Mahad, Sudhagad | |
| MH-07 | Sindhudurg | Location: Oros, Kudal taluka | Jurisdiction: Entire Sindhudurg district | |
| MH-08 | Ratnagiri | Location: Kuwarbav, Ratnagiri district | Jurisdiction: Entire Ratnagiri district | |
| MH-09 | Kolhapur | Location: Tarabai Park, Kolhapur | Jurisdiction: Entire Kolhapur district | |
| MH-10 | Sangli | Location: Madhav Nagar Road, Sangli | Jurisdiction: Entire Sangli district except Jat Taluka | |
| MH-11 | Satara | Location: Camp, Satara | Jurisdiction: Entire Satara district | |
| MH-12 | Pune | Location: Sangam Bridge, Raja Bahadur Mills Road, Pune | Jurisdiction: Pune City and Talukas of Haveli, Bhor, Velhe, Purandar, Shirur. Parts of Mulshi Taluka are also covered by this RTO | All codes in this series have been allocated, and this RTO is the first in India that has been completely exhausted. MH61 has been allocated as the new RTO code for the same jurisdiction. |
| MH-13 | Solapur | Location: Vijapur Road, Solapur | Jurisdiction: Talukas of North Solapur, Solapur South, Mangalwedha, Barshi, Mohol, Pandharpur, Akkalkot | |
| MH-14 | Pimpri-Chinchwad | Location: Sector 6, Pradhikaran, Nigdi, Pimpri-Chinchwad, Pune district | Jurisdiction: Pimpri-Chinchwad Municipal Corporation and Hinjawadi, parts of Mulshi Taluka, Talukas of Junnar, Khed, Maval, Ambegaon | |
| MH-15 | Nashik | Location: Panchavati, Nashik | Jurisdiction: Talukas of Nashik, Dindori, Trimbakeshwar, Surgana, Yeola, Chandvad, Niphad, Sinnar, Peth, Igatpuri | |
| MH-16 | Ahmednagar | Location: Wambori Road, Ahmednagar | Jurisdiction: Talukas of Nagar, Jamkhed, Shrigonda, Pathardi, Parner, Karjat, Shevgaon | |
| MH-17 | Shrirampur | Location: Nevasa Road, Shrirampur, Ahmednagar district | Jurisdiction: Talukas of Shrirampur, Nevasa, Rahuri, Rahta, Kopargaon, Sangamner, Akole | |
| MH-18 | Dhule | Location: Mumbai Agra Road, Dhule | Jurisdiction: Entire Dhule District | |
| MH-19 | Jalgaon | Location: Adarsh Nagar, Jalgaon | Jurisdiction: Talukas of Jalgaon, Bhusawal, Jamner, Yaval, Bodwad, Muktainagar and Raver | |
| MH-20 | Chhatrapati Sambhajinagar | Location: Railway Station Road, Chhatrapati Sambhajinagar | Jurisdiction: Entire Chhatrapati Sambhajinagar district | |
| MH-21 | Jalna | Location: Nagewadi, Jalna | Jurisdiction: Entire Jalna District | |
| MH-22 | Parbhani | Location: Manvat Road, Parbhani | Jurisdiction: Entire Parbhani District | |
| MH-23 | Beed | Location: Jalna Road, Beed | Jurisdiction: Talukas of Beed, Ashti, Gevrai, Patoda, Shirur Kasar | |
| MH-24 | Latur | Location: Babhalgaon Road, Latur | Jurisdiction: Talukas of Latur, Ausa, Nilanga, Renapur and Chakur | |
| MH-25 | Dharashiv | Location: MIDC, Osmanabad | Jurisdiction: Entire Dharashiv District | |
| MH-26 | Nanded | Location: CIDCO, Nanded | Jurisdiction: Entire Nanded District | |
| MH-27 | Amravati | Location: Collectorate Camp, Amaravati | Jurisdiction: Entire Amaravati District | |
| MH-28 | Buldhana | Location: Malkapur Road, Buldhana | Jurisdiction: Tehsil including Buldhana, Motala, Chikhali, Mehkar, Lonar, Sindkhed Raja and Deulgaon Raja | |
| MH-29 | Yavatmal | Location: Nagpur Road, Yavatmal | Jurisdiction: Entire Yavatmal District | |
| MH-30 | Akola | Location: Murtijapur Road, Akola | Jurisdiction: Entire Akola District | |
| MH-31 | Nagpur West | Location: opposite Giripeth Post Office, Nagpur | Jurisdiction: Western Suburbs of Nagpur City | |
| MH-32 | Wardha | Location: Sevagram Road, Wardha | Jurisdiction: Entire Wardha District | |
| MH-33 | Gadchiroli | Location: near Collector Office, Gadchiroli | Jurisdiction: Entire Gadchiroli District | |
| MH-34 | Chandrapur | Location: Jal Nagar Ward, Chandrapur | Jurisdiction: Entire Chandrapur District | |
| MH-35 | Gondia | Location: Fulchurtola, Gondia | Jurisdiction: Entire Gondia District | |
| MH-36 | Bhandara | Location: National Highway 6, Bhandara | Jurisdiction: Entire Bhandara District | |
| MH-37 | Washim | Location: Lakhala, Washim | Jurisdiction: Entire Washim District | |
| MH-38 | Hingoli | Location: Limbala Matka, Hingoli | Jurisdiction: Entire Hingoli District | |
| MH-39 | Nandurbar | Location: Sakri Road, Nandurbar | Jurisdiction: Entire Nandurbar District | |
| MH-40 | Nagpur Rural | Location: Indora, Nagpur district | Jurisdiction: Entire Nagpur District except Nagpur Urban Taluka | |
| MH-41 | Malegaon | Location: Camp, Malegaon, Nashik district | Jurisdiction: Talukas of Malegaon, Satana, Kalwan, Deola, Nandgaon | |
| MH-42 | Baramati | Location: Bhigwan Road, Baramati, Pune district | Jurisdiction: Talukas of Baramati, Indapur, Daund | |
| MH-43 | Navi Mumbai | Location: SBI Colony, Sector 13, Nerul, Navi Mumbai | Jurisdiction: Airoli to CBD Belapur and surrounding areas in Thane Taluka | |
| MH-44 | Ambajogai | Location: Morewadi, Ambajogai, Beed district | Jurisdiction: Talukas of Ambajogai, Kaij, Vadvani, Majalgaon, Parli, Dharur | |
| MH-45 | Akluj | Location: Anand Nagar, Akluj, Malshiras Taluka, Solapur district | Jurisdiction: Talukas of Malshiras, Madha, Sangola, Karmala | |
| MH-46 | Panvel | Location: Kalamboli, Panvel, Raigad district | Jurisdiction: Kharghar to Panvel suburbs in Navi Mumbai, Talukas of Panvel, Uran, Khalapur, Karjat | |
| MH-47 | Mumbai North (Borivali) | Location: Dahisar West, Mumbai Suburban district | Jurisdiction: Goregaon to Dahisar in Mumbai Suburban District | |
| MH-48 | Vasai | Location: Bhatpara, Virar East, Palghar district | Jurisdiction: Vasai-Virar City Limits and whole of Palghar District | |
| MH-49 | Nagpur East | Location: Chikhali Layout, Nagpur | Jurisdiction: Eastern Suburbs of Nagpur City | |
| MH-50 | Karad | Location: Supane, Karad, Satara district | Jurisdiction: Karad and Patan Talukas | |
| MH-51 | Ichalkaranji | Location: Vikash Nagar, Ichalkaranji, Kolhapur district | Jurisdiction: Ichalkaranji Town and Talukas of Hatkanangle and Shirol | |
| MH-52 | Chalisgaon | Location: Shastri Nagar, Bhadgaon Road, Chalisgaon, Jalgaon district | Jurisdiction: Chalisgaon Taluka | |
| MH-53 | Phaltan | Location: Sanmati Nagar, Shinganpur Road, Phaltan, Satara district | Jurisdiction: Talukas of Phaltan and Man | |
| MH-54 | Bhadgaon | Location: Mauje Tongaon, Bhadgaon - Pachora Marg, Opp. Ashirwad Jining, Bhadgaon, Jalgaon district | Jurisdiction: Talukas of Bhadgaon, Pachora, Parola, Amalner, Chopada, Erandol, Dharangaon | |
| MH-55 | Udgir | Location: Venkatesh Nagar, Ramchandra Nagar, Udgir, Latur district | Jurisdiction: Talukas of Udgir, Deoni, Jalkot, Shirur Anantpal and Ahmadpur | |
| MH-56 | Khamgaon | Location: Near JV Mehta New Era High School, Khamgaon, Buldhana district | Jurisdiction: Talukas of Khamgaon, Nandura, Shegaon, Malkapur, Jalgaon Jamod and Sangrampur | |
| MH-57 | Vaijapur | Location: Valmik Nagar, Vaijapur, Aurangabad district | Jurisdiction: Talukas of Vaijapur and Gangapur | |
| MH-58 | Mira-Bhayandar | Location: Ghodbunder Rd, Kashimira, Mira-Bhayandar, Thane district | Jurisdiction: Mira Road-Bhayandar Municipal Limits in Thane Taluka | |
| MH-59 | Jat | Location: Jat, Sangli district | Jurisdiction: | |
| MH-60 | Palghar | Location: Umroli, Boisar, Palghar district (Speculative) | Jurisdiction: Entire Palghar District excluding Vasai Taluka (Speculative) | |
| MH-61 | Pune (New) | Location: Sangam Bridge, Raja Bahadur Mills Road, Pune | Jurisdiction: Pune City and Talukas of Haveli, Bhor, Velha, Indapur, Purandar, Shirur. Parts of Mulshi Taluka are also covered by this RTO | |

== ML—Meghalaya ==
| Code | Office location | Jurisdiction area | Annotations |
|---|---|---|---|
| ML-01 | Meghalaya Government vehicles | N/A | |
| ML-02 | Meghalaya Police vehicles | N/A | |
| ML-04 | Jowai | Jaintia Hills | |
| ML-05 | Shillong | Shillong | |
| ML-06 | Nongstoin | West Khasi Hills | |
| ML-07 | William Nagar | East Garo Hills | |
| ML-08 | Tura | West Garo Hills | |
| ML-09 | Baghmara | South Garo Hills | |
| ML-10 | Nongpoh | Ri-Bhoi | |

== MN—Manipur ==
| Code | Office location | Jurisdiction area | Annotations |
|---|---|---|---|
| MN-01 | Imphal West | Imphal West | |
| MN-02 | Churachandpur | Churachandpur | |
| MN-03 | Kangpokpi | Kangpokpi | |
| MN-04 | Thoubal | Thoubal | |
| MN-05 | Bishnupur | Bishnupur | |
| MN-06 | Imphal East | Imphal East | |
| MN-07 | Ukhrul | Ukhrul | |
| MN-08 | Senapati | Senapati | |

== MP—Madhya Pradesh ==
| Code | Office location | Jurisdiction area | Annotations |
|---|---|---|---|
| MP-01 | Bhopal | entire Madhya Pradesh | Governor of Madhya Pradesh vehicles |
| MP-02 | Bhopal | entire Madhya Pradesh | MP Government vehicles |
| MP-03 | Bhopal | entire Madhya Pradesh | MP Police vehicles |
| MP-04 | Bhopal | Bhopal | |
| MP-067oshangabad]] | | | |
| MP-06 | Morena | Morena | |
| MP-07 | Gwalior | Gwalior | |
| MP-08 | Guna | Guna | |
| MP-09 | Indore | Indore | |
| MP-10 | Khargone | Khargone | |
| MP-11 | Dhar | Dhar | |
| MP-12 | Khandwa | Khandwa | |
| MP-13 | Ujjain | Ujjain | |
| MP-14 | Mandsaur | Mandsaur | |
| MP-15 | Sagar | Sagar | |
| MP-16 | Chhatarpur | Chhatarpur | |
| MP-17 | Rewa | Rewa | |
| MP-18 | Shahdol | Shahdol | |
| MP-19 | Satna | Satna | |
| MP-20 | Jabalpur | Jabalpur | |
| MP-21 | Katni | Katni | |
| MP-22 | Seoni | Seoni | |
| MP-28 | Chhindwara | Chhindwara | |
| MP-30 | Bhind | Bhind | |
| MP-31 | Sheopur | Sheopur | |
| MP-32 | Datia | Datia | |
| MP-33 | Shivpuri | Shivpuri | |
| MP-34 | Damoh | Damoh | |
| MP-35 | Panna | Panna | |
| MP-36 | Tikamgarh | Tikamgarh | |
| MP-37 | Sehore | Sehore | |
| MP-38 | Raisen | Raisen | |
| MP-39 | Rajgarh | Rajgarh | |
| MP-40 | Vidisha | Vidisha | |
| MP-41 | Dewas | Dewas | |
| MP-42 | Shajapur | Shajapur | |
| MP-43 | Ratlam | Ratlam | |
| MP-44 | Neemuch | Neemuch | |
| MP-45 | Jhabua | Jhabua | |
| MP-46 | Barwani | Barwani | |
| MP-47 | Harda | Harda | |
| MP-48 | Betul | Betul | |
| MP-49 | Narsinghpur | Narsinghpur | |
| MP-50 | Balaghat | Balaghat | |
| MP-51 | Mandla | Mandla | |
| MP-52 | Dindori | Dindori | |
| MP-53 | Sidhi | Sidhi | |
| MP-54 | Umaria | Umaria | |
| MP-65 | Anuppur | Anuppur | |
| MP-66 | Singrauli | Waidhan | |
| MP-67 | Ashoknagar | Ashoknagar | |
| MP-68 | Burhanpur | Burhanpur | |
| MP-69 | Alirajpur | Alirajpur | |
| MP-70 | Agar | Agar Malwa | |
| MP-71 | Niwari | Niwari | |
| MP-79 | Mauganj | Mauganj | |
| MP-73 | Maihar | Maihar | |
| MP-74 | Pandhurna | Pandhurna | |

== MZ—Mizoram ==
| Code | Office location | Jurisdiction area | Annotations |
|---|---|---|---|
| MZ-01 | Aizawl | | |
| MZ-02 | Lunglei | | |
| MZ-03 | Saiha | | |
| MZ-04 | Champhai | | |
| MZ-05 | Kolasib | | |
| MZ-06 | Serchhip | | |
| MZ-07 | Lawngtlai | | |
| MZ-08 | Mamit | | |

== NL—Nagaland ==
| Code | Office location | Jurisdiction area | Annotations |
|---|---|---|---|
| NL-01 | Kohima | Kohima District | |
| NL-02 | Mokokchung District | Mokokchung District | |
| NL-03 | Tuensang District | Tuensang District | |
| NL-04 | Mon District | Mon District | |
| NL-05 | Wokha District | Wokha District | |
| NL-06 | Zünheboto District | Zünheboto District | |
| NL-07 | Chümoukedima District; Dimapur District; Niuland District | Chümoukedima District; Dimapur District; Niuland District | |
| NL-08 | Phek District | Phek District | |
| NL-09 | entire Nagaland | entire Nagaland | Government of Nagaland vehicles (Non-Transport) |
| NL-10 | entire Nagaland | entire Nagaland | Government of Nagaland vehicles (Transport) |

== OD—Odisha ==
Due to the official respelling of the state name in English (from "Orissa" to "Odisha"), the Transport Department modified the state letter on the plates with OD substituting OR on 1 September 2012.

| Code | Office location | Jurisdiction area | Annotations |
|---|---|---|---|
| OD-01 | Balasore | Balasore district | |
| OD-02 | Bhubaneswar | Khurda district | |
| OD-03 | Bolangir | Bolangir district | |
| OD-04 | Chandikhol | Jajpur district | |
| OD-05 | Cuttack | Cuttack district | |
| OD-06 | Dhenkanal | Dhenkanal district | |
| OD-07 | Chatrapur | Ganjam district | |
| OD-08 | Bhawanipatna | Kalahandi district | |
| OD-09 | Keonjhar | Keonjhar district | |
| OD-10 | Koraput | Koraput district | |
| OD-11 | Baripada | Mayurbhanj district | |
| OD-12 | Phulbani | Kandhamal district | |
| OD-13 | Puri | Puri district | |
| OD-14 | Rourkela | Sundargarh district | |
| OD-15 | Sambalpur | Sambalpur district | |
| OD-16 | Sundargarh | Sundargarh district | |
| OD-17 | Bargarh | Bargarh district | |
| OD-18 | Rayagada | Rayagada district | |
| OD-19 | Angul | Angul district | |
| OD-20 | Paralakhemundi | Gajapati district | |
| OD-21 | Jagatsinghpur | Jagatsinghpur district | |
| OD-22 | Bhadrak | Bhadrak district | |
| OD-23 | Jharsuguda | Jharsuguda district | |
| OD-24 | Nabarangpur | Nabarangpur district | |
| OD-25 | Nayagarh | Nayagarh district | |
| OD-26 | Nuapada | Nuapada district | |
| OD-27 | Boudh | Boudh district | |
| OD-28 | Debagarh | Debagarh district | |
| OD-29 | Kendrapara | Kendrapara district | |
| OD-30 | Malkangiri | Malkangiri district | |
| OD-31 | Subarnapur | Subarnapur district | |
| OD-32 | Bhanjanagar | Ganjam district | |
| OD-33 | Bhubaneswar-II | Khurda district | |
| OD-34 | Jajpur | Jajpur district | |
| OD-35 | Talcher | Angul district | |

== PB—Punjab ==
| Code | Office location | Jurisdiction area | Annotations |
|---|---|---|---|
| PB-01 | Rented cars, self drive cars in Chandigarh & taxi vehicles from Punjab | | |
| PB-02 | Amritsar (1) | | |
| PB-03 | Bathinda | | |
| PB-04 | Faridkot | | |
| PB-05 | Ferozpur | | |
| PB-06 | Gurdaspur | | |
| PB-07 | Hoshiarpur | | |
| PB-08 | Jalandhar (1) | | |
| PB-09 | Kapurthala | | |
| PB-10 | Ludhiana (West) | | |
| PB-11 | Patiala | | |
| PB-12 | Rupnagar | | |
| PB-13 | Sangrur | | |
| PB-14 | Ajnala | | |
| PB-15 | Abohar | | |
| PB-16 | Anandpur Sahib | | |
| PB-17 | Baba Bakala | | |
| PB-18 | Batala | | |
| PB-19 | Barnala | | |
| PB-20 | Balachaur | | |
| PB-21 | Dasuya | | |
| PB-22 | Fazilka | | |
| PB-23 | Fatehgarh Sahib | | |
| PB-24 | Garhshankar | | |
| PB-25 | Jagraon | | |
| PB-26 | Khanna | | |
| PB-27 | Kharar | | |
| PB-28 | Malerkotla | | |
| PB-29 | Moga | | |
| PB-30 | Muktsar | | |
| PB-31 | Mansa | | |
| PB-32 | Nawanshahar | | |
| PB-33 | Nakodar | | |
| PB-34 | Nabha | | |
| PB-35 | Pathankot | | |
| PB-36 | Phagwara | | |
| PB-37 | Phillaur | | |
| PB-38 | Patti | | |
| PB-39 | Rajpura | | |
| PB-40 | Rampura Phul | | |
| PB-41 | Sultanpur Lodhi | | |
| PB-42 | Samana | | |
| PB-43 | Samrala | | |
| PB-44 | Sunam | | |
| PB-45 | Talwandi Sabo | | |
| PB-46 | Tarn Taran | | |
| PB-47 | Zira | | |
| PB-48 | Amloh | | |
| PB-49 | Khamanon | | |
| PB-50 | Budhlada | | |
| PB-51 | Sardulgarh | | |
| PB-52 | Bassi Pathana | | |
| PB-53 | Malout | | |
| PB-54 | Mukerian | | |
| PB-55 | Payal | | |
| PB-56 | Raikot | | |
| PB-57 | Bhulath | | |
| PB-58 | Dera Baba Nanak | | |
| PB-59 | Dhuri | | |
| PB-60 | Gidderbaha | | |
| PB-61 | Jalalabad | | |
| PB-62 | Jaitu | | |
| PB-63 | Khadoor Sahib | | |
| PB-64 | Moonak | | |
| PB-65 | Mohali | | |
| PB-66 | Nihal Singh Wala | | |
| PB-67 | Shahkot | | |
| PB-68 | Dhar Kalan | | |
| PB-69 | Bagha Purana | | |
| PB-70 | Dera Bassi | | |
| PB-71 | Chamkaur Sahib | | |
| PB-72 | Pattran | | |
| PB-73 | Tappa Mandi | | |
| PB-74 | Nangal | | |
| PB-75 | Lehragaga | | |
| PB-76 | Dharamkot | | |
| PB-77 | Guru Har Sahai | | |
| PB-78 | Banga | | |
| PB-79 | Kotkapura | | |
| PB-80 | Maur | | |
| PB-81 | Majitha | | |
| PB-82 | Ahmedgarh | | |
| PB-83 | Dudhan Sadhan | | |
| PB-84 | Bhawanigarh | | |
| PB-85 | Kalanaur | | |
| PB-86 | Dirba | | |
| PB-87 | Morinda | | |
| PB-88 | Bhikhiwind | | |
| PB-89 | Amritsar (2) | | |
| PB-90 | Jalandhar (2) | | |
| PB-91 | Ludhiana (East) | | |
| PB-92 | Amargarh | | |
| PB-93 | Lopoke | | |
| PB-99 | Dinanagar | | |

== PY—Puducherry ==
| Code | Office location | Jurisdiction area | Annotations |
|---|---|---|---|
| PY-01 | Puducherry | | |
| PY-02 | Karaikal | | |
| PY-03 | Mahe | | |
| PY-04 | Yanam | | |
| PY-05 | Oulgaret | | |

== RJ—Rajasthan ==
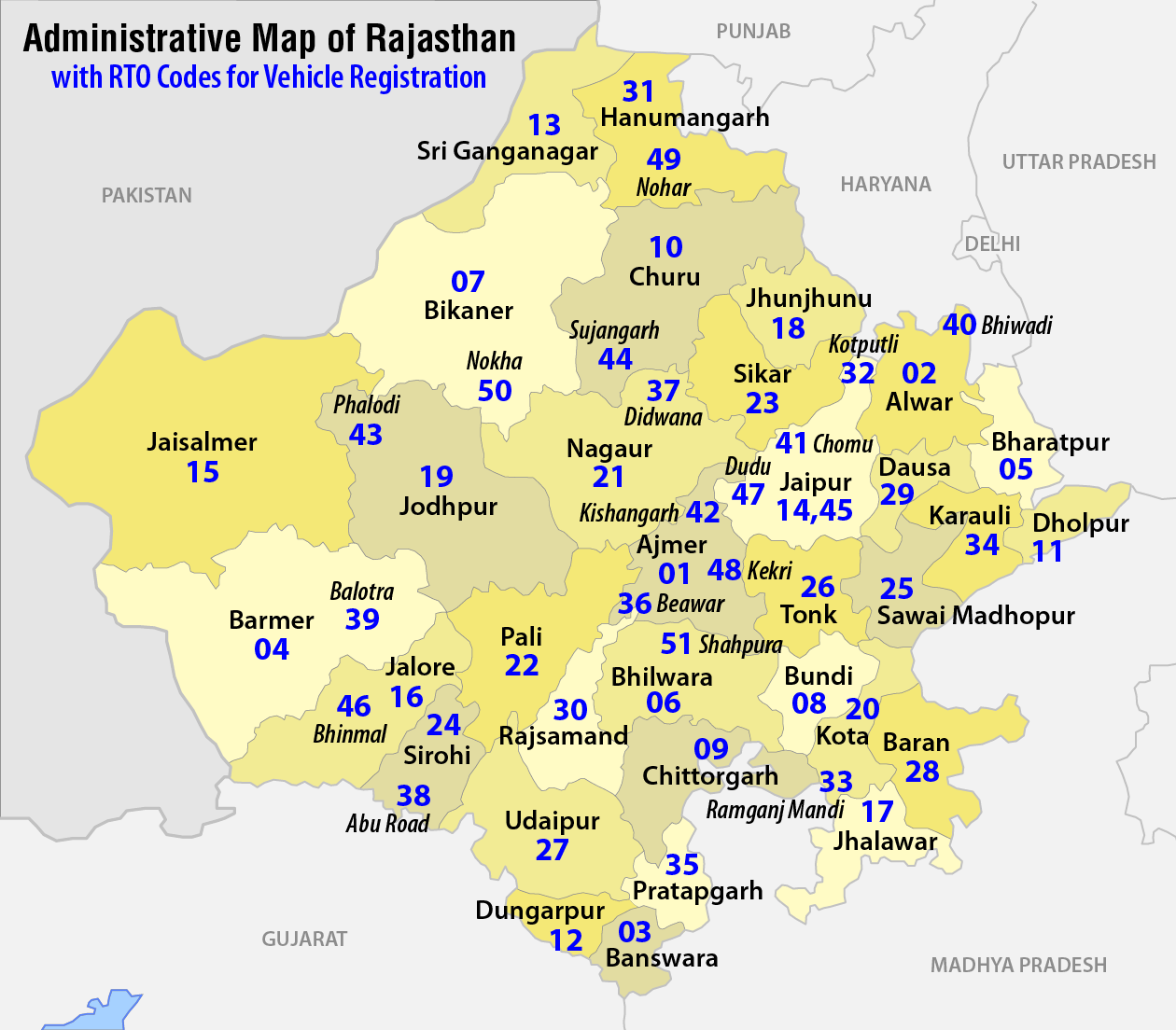
Districts of Rajasthan with RTO codes

| Code | DTO/RTO(Office) (Location & Name) | District | Old Code(s), Pre 1989 | Old Taxi Series, Pre 1989 |
|---|---|---|---|---|
| RJ-01 | Ajmer | Ajmer district | RJZ, RSZ, RRZ, RNW, RNZ, RPZ | RRT (7001-8000) |
| RJ-02 | Alwar | Alwar district | RJA, RSA, RRA, RNA, RPD | RST (1-500) |
| RJ-03 | Banswara | Banswara district | RJB, RPB | RST (501-750) |
| RJ-04 | Barmer | Barmer district | RJC | RST (751-1000) |
| RJ-05 | Bharatpur | Bharatpur district | RJD, RSD, RRD | RST (1001-1500) |
| RJ-06 | Bhilwara | Bhilwara district | RJE, RSE, RRE | RST (1501-2000) |
| RJ-07 | Bikaner | Bikaner district | RJF, RSF, RRF | RST (2001-2250) |
| RJ-08 | Bundi | Bundi district | RJG | RST (2251-2500) |
| RJ-09 | Chittorgarh | Chittorgarh district | RJH, RSH, RRH | RST (2501-3000) |
| RJ-10 | Churu | Churu district | RJI, RSI, RPI | RST (3001-3250) |
| RJ-11 | Dholpur | Dholpur district | RNT | RRT (8001-9000) |
| RJ-12 | Dungarpur | Dungarpur district | RJJ | RST (3251-3500) |
| RJ-13 | Sri Ganganagar | Sri Ganganagar district | RJK, RSK, RRK, RSC, RRC, RNC, RNK, RNU | RST (3501-4500) |
| RJ-14 | Jaipur (South) | Jaipur district | Goods vehicles - RJL, RSL, RRL, RSM, RRM, RSG, RRG, RSB, RRB, RNB, RND, RNE, RNH, RNI, RNL, RNV, RNX, RNG, Others vehicles - RNP, RPE, RPH, RPI, TPG, RPP | RST (1-4000) |
| RJ-15 | Jaisalmer | Jaisalmer district | RJM | RRT (4501-4750) |
| RJ-16 | Jalore | Jalore district | RJN | RRT (4751-5000) |
| RJ-17 | Jhalawar | Jhalawar district | RJO | RRT (5000-5250) |
| RJ-18 | Jhunjhunu | Jhunjhunu district | RJP, RSP, RRP | RRT (5251-5500) |
| RJ-19 | Jodhpur | Jodhpur district | RJQ, RSQ, RRQ, RSN, RRN, RNJ, RNM, RNN, RNQ, RNS, RPK, RPL | RST (4001-5000) |
| RJ-20 | Kota | Kota district | RJR, RSR, RRR, RSO, RRQ, RNO, RNR, RPF, RPM, RPN | RST (5001-6000) |
| RJ-21 | Nagaur | Nagaur district | RJS, RSS | RRP (5501-6000) |
| RJ-22 | Pali | Pali district | RJT, RPA, RPC | RRT (6001-6500) |
| RJ-23 | Sikar | Sikar district | RJB, RSB, RRB | RRT (6751-7000),(7751-8200) |
| RJ-24 | Sirohi | Sirohi district | RJW, RSW, RRW | RRT (7001-7500) |
| RJ-25 | Sawai Madhopur | Sawai Madhopur district | RJU, RSU, RRU | RRT (6501-6750) |
| RJ-26 | Tonk | Tonk district | RJX, RSX | RRT (7501-7750) |
| RJ-27 | Udaipur | Udaipur district | RJY, RSY, RRY, RSJ, RRJ, RNY, RPJ, RPO | RST (6001-7000) |
| RJ-28 | Baran | Baran district | - | - |
| RJ-29 | Dausa | Dausa district | - | - |
| RJ-30 | Rajsamand | Rajsamand district | - | - |
| RJ-31 | Hanumangarh | Hanumangarh district | - | - |
| RJ-32 | Kotputli | Kotputli-Behror district | - | - |
| RJ-33 | Ramganj Mandi | Kota district | - | - |
| RJ-34 | Karauli | Karauli district | - | - |
| RJ-35 | Pratapgarh | Pratapgarh district | - | - |
| RJ-36 | Beawar | Beawar District | - | - |
| RJ-37 | Didwana | Didwana-Kuchaman district | - | - |
| RJ-38 | Abu Road | Sirohi district | - | - |
| RJ-39 | Balotra | Balotra district | - | - |
| RJ-40 | Bhiwadi | Khairthal-Tijara district | - | - |
| RJ-41 | Chomu | Jaipur district | - | - |
| RJ-42 | Kishangarh | Ajmer district | - | - |
| RJ-43 | Phalodi | Phalodi district | - | - |
| RJ-44 | Sujangarh | Churu district | - | - |
| RJ-45 | Jaipur (North) | Jaipur district | - | - |
| RJ-46 | Bhinmal | Jalore district | - | - |
| RJ-47 | Dudu | Jaipur district | - | - |
| RJ-48 | Kekri | Ajmer district | - | - |
| RJ-49 | Nohar | Hanumangarh district | - | - |
| RJ-50 | Nokha | Bikaner district | - | - |
| RJ-51 | Shahpura | Bhilwara district | - | - |
| RJ-52 | Shahpura | Jaipur district | - | - |
| RJ-53 | Khetri | Jhunjhunu district | - | - |
| RJ-54 | Piparcity | Jodhpur district | - | - |
| RJ-55 | Pokhran | Jaisalmer district | - | - |
| RJ-56 | Sadulshahar | Sri Ganganagar district | - | - |
| RJ-57 | Sumerpur | Pali district | - | - |
| RJ-58 | Salumbar | Salumbar district | - | - |
| RJ-59 | Shahpura | Jaipur district | - | - |
| RJ-60 | Jaipur(Additional) | Jaipur district | - | - |

== SK—Sikkim ==
| Code | Office location | Jurisdiction area | Annotations |
|---|---|---|---|
| SK-01 | Gangtok | Gangtok | |
| SK-02 | Gyalshing | Gyalshing district | |
| SK-03 | Mangan | Mangan | |
| SK-04 | Jorethang | Namchi district | |
| SK-05 | Namchi | Namchi district | |
| SK-06 | Soreng | Soreng district | |
| SK-07 | Pakyong | Pakyong district | |
| SK-08 | Singtam | | |

== TG—Telangana ==
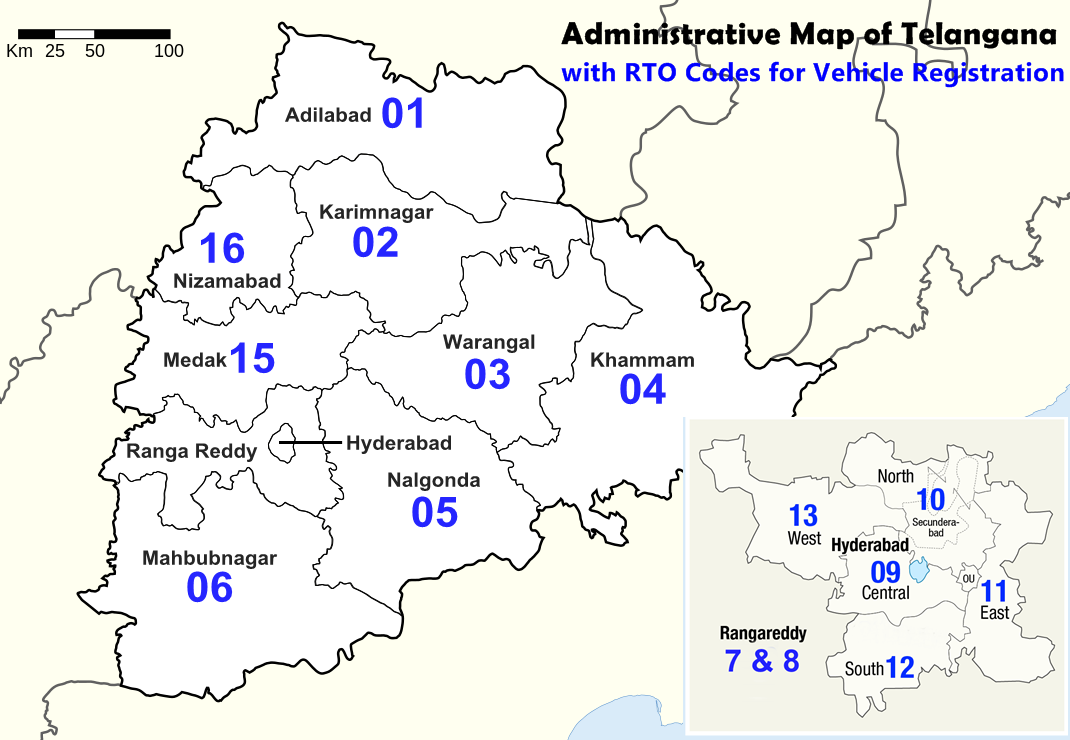
Telangana RTO codes before the reorganization of districts

| Code | Office location | Jurisdiction area | Annotations |
|---|---|---|---|
| TG-01 | Adilabad | Adilabad district | |
| TG-02 | Karimnagar | Karimnagar district | Sub-agencies: Huzurabad (MVI) |
| TG-03 | Warangal | Hanamkonda district | |
| TG-04 | Khammam | Khammam district | Sub-agencies: Sathupalli (AMVI), Wyra (MVI) |
| TG-05 | Nalgonda | Nalgonda district | Sub-agencies: Miryalaguda (MVI) |
| TG-06 | Mahbubnagar | Mahbubnagar district | |
| TG-07 | Attapur (Hyderabad)* | Ranga Reddy | Sub-agencies: Ibrahimpatnam (RTO), Shadnagar (MVI) |
| TG-08 | Medchal (Hyderabad)* | Medchal-Malkajgiri District | Sub-agencies: Uppal Kalan (Hyderabad)* (RTO), Kukatpally (Hyderabad)* (MVI) |
| TG-09 | Khairtabad (Hyderabad) | Hyderabad Central | |
| TG-10 | Secunderabad (Hyderabad) | Hyderabad North | |
| TG-11 | Malakpet (Hyderabad) | Hyderabad East | |
| TG-12 | Kishanbagh (Hyderabad) | Hyderabad South | |
| TG-13 | Tolichowki (Hyderabad) | Hyderabad West | |
| TG-14 | Hyderabad | Reserved for Hyderabad | |
| TG-15 | Sangareddy | Sangareddy district | Sub-agencies: Patancheru (Hyderabad)* (MVI), Zaheerabad (MVI) |
| TG-16 | Nizamabad | Nizamabad district | Sub-agencies: Armoor (MVI), Bodhan (MVI) |
| TG-17 | Kamareddy | Kamareddy district | |
| TG-18 | Nirmal | Nirmal district | |
| TG-19 | Mancherial | Mancherial district | |
| TG-20 | Asifabad | Komaram Bheem district | |
| TG-21 | Jagtial | Jagtial district | Sub-agencies: Koratla (MVI) |
| TG-22 | Peddapalli | Peddapalli district | Sub-agencies: Ramagundam (MVI) |
| TG-23 | Sircilla | Sircilla district | |
| TG-24 | Warangal | Warangal district | |
| TG-25 | Bhupalpalle | Jayashankar Bhupalpally district | |
| TG-26 | Mahabubabad | Mahabubabad district | |
| TG-27 | Jangaon | Jangaon district | |
| TG-28 | Kothagudem | Bhadradri Kothagudem district | Sub-agencies: Bhadrachalam (MVI) |
| TG-29 | Suryapet | Suryapet district | Sub-agencies: Kodad (MVI) |
| TG-30 | Bhuvanagiri | Yadadri Bhuvanagiri district | |
| TG-31 | Nagarkurnool | Nagarkurnool district | Sub-agencies: Kalwakurthy (MVI) |
| TG-32 | Wanaparthy | Wanaparthy district | Sub-agencies: Pebbair (MVI) |
| TG-33 | Gadwal | Jogulamba Gadwal district | |
| TG-34 | Vikarabad | Vikarabad district | Sub-agencies: Parigi (MVI) |
| TG-35 | Medak | Medak district | |
| TG-36 | Siddipet | Siddipet district | |
| TG-37 | Mulugu | Mulugu district | |
| TG-38 | Narayanpet | Narayanpet district | |

Note * Part of 3 Municipal Corporations of Hyderabad but not part of Hyderabad Dist.

The two-letter state code for Telangana Region in Andhra Pradesh was AP until the State Bifurcation and after the formation of Telangana State, the state was chosen as TS. It continued up to May 2024 before it was changed to TG. The AP and TS codes, however, remain valid.

Specifics in the Telangana series
| Scheme and/or example | Meaning |
|---|---|
| TG XX A 1234 to TG XX SZ 1234 | The letters A to S are reserved for passenger vehicles. |
| TG-09-Px : TG 09 PA 1234, TG 09 PB 1234 | TG-09-P of Hyderabad Central RTO is specifically used for Telangana Police vehicles. |
| TG XX T 1234 to TG XX YZ 1234 | The letters T, U, V, W, X, Y are reserved for commercial vehicles. |
| TG-xx-Z : TG XX Z 1234 to TG XX ZZ 1234 | The letter Z is reserved for the State Road Transport (TGSRTC) buses.. |

Older Registrations of Telangana till 2014 (Before Bifurcation from Andhra Pradesh)
| Code | Jurisdiction |
|---|---|
| AP 01 | Adilabad District |
| AP 09 | Hyderabad Central (Khairatabad) |
| AP 10 | Hyderabad North (Secunderabad) |
| AP 11 | Hyderabad East (Malakpet) |
| AP 12 | Hyderabad South (Kishanbagh) |
| AP 13 | Hyderabad West (Mehdipatnam) |
| AP 15 | Karimnagar District |
| AP 20 | Khammam District |
| AP 22 | Mahabubnagar District |
| AP 23 | Medak District |
| AP 24 | Nalgonda District |
| AP 25 | Nizamabad District |
| AP 28 | Rangareddy District (Attapur, Hyderabad)* |
| AP 29 | Rangareddy District (Uppal, Hyderabad)* |
| AP 36 | Warangal District |

== TN—Tamil Nadu ==
In Tamil Nadu, specific series are exclusively used for certain type of vehicles

- All State Transport Corporation vehicles start the series with 'N' or 'AN'
- All Government owned vehicles start the series with 'G', 'AG', 'BG', 'CG' or 'DG', Etc., (all Combination of G)

No RTO is assigned with number that would add up to '8'. There is no 08, 17, 26, 35, 44, 53, 62, 71, 80, 89, 98.

| Code | Location | District | Zone | Annotations |
|---|---|---|---|---|
| TN-01 | Chennai (Central): Ayanavaram | Chennai | Chennai North | SETC & MTC buses are registered here under TN 01 N XXXX. |
| TN-02 | Chennai (North West): Anna Nagar | Chennai | Chennai North | |
| TN-03 | Chennai (North East): Tondiarpet | Chennai | Chennai North | |
| TN-04 | Chennai (East): Royapuram | Chennai | Chennai North | |
| TN-05 | Chennai (North): Kolathur | Chennai | Chennai North | |
| TN-06 | Chennai (South East): Mandavelli | Chennai | Chennai South | |
| TN-07 | Chennai (South): Adyar | Chennai | Chennai South | |
| TN-09 | Chennai (West): K. K. Nagar | Chennai | Chennai South | |
| TN-10 | Chennai (South West): Virugambakkam | Chennai | Chennai South | |
| TN-11 | Tambaram | Chengalpattu | Chennai South | |
| TN-12 | Poonamallee | Tiruvallur | Chennai North | |
| TN-13 | Ambattur | Chennai | Chennai North | |
| TN-14 | Sholinganallur | Chengalpattu | Chennai South | |
| TN-15 | Ulundurpet | Kallakurichi | Villupuram | |
| TN-15M | Kallakurichi | Kallakurichi | Villupuram | Shared series with Ulunderpettai |
| TN-16 | Tindivanam | Villupuram | Villupuram | |
| TN-16Z | Gingee | Villupuram | Villupuram | Unit office of the RTO |
| TN-18 | Red Hills | Tiruvallur | Chennai North | |
| TN-18Y | Gummidipoondi | Tiruvallur | Chennai North | Unit office of the RTO |
| TN-19 | Chengalpattu | Chengalpattu | Chennai South | |
| TN-19Y | Thirukazhugundram | Chengalpattu | Chennai South | Unit office of the RTO |
| TN-19Z | Madurantakam | Chengalpattu | Chennai South | Unit office of the RTO |
| TN-20 | Tiruvallur | Tiruvallur | Chennai North | TNSTC-Villupuram / Thiruvallur Region buses are registered here under TN 20 N XXXX. |
| TN-20X | Thiruthani | Tiruvallur | Chennai North | Unit office of the RTO |
| TN-21 | Kanchipuram | Kanchipuram | Chennai South | TNSTC-Villupuram / Kanchipuram Region buses are registered here under TN 21 N XXXX. |
| TN-22 | Meenambakkam | Chennai | Chennai South | |
| TN-23 | Vellore | Vellore | Vellore | TNSTC-Villupuram / Vellore Region buses are registered here under TN 23 N XXXX. |
| TN-23T | Gudiyatham | Vellore | Vellore | Unit office of the RTO |
| TN-24 | Krishnagiri | Krishnagiri | Vellore | |
| TN-25 | Thiruvannamalai | Thiruvannamalai | Villupuram | TNSTC-Villupuram / Thiruvannamalai Region buses are registered here under TN 25 N XXXX. |
| TN-27 | Salem | Salem | | Not in use |
| TN-28 | Namakkal (North) | Namakkal | Erode | |
| TN-28Z | Rasipuram | Namakkal | Erode | Unit office of the RTO |
| TN-29 | Dharmapuri | Dharmapuri | Salem | TNSTC-Salem / Dharmapuri Region buses are registered here under TN 29 N XXXX. |
| TN-29W | Palacode | Dharmapuri | Salem | Unit office of the RTO |
| TN-29Z | Harur | Dharmapuri | Salem | Unit office of the RTO |
| TN-30 | Salem (West) | Salem | Salem | TNSTC-Salem / Salem Region buses are registered here under TN 30 N XXXX. |
| TN-30W | Omalur | Salem | Salem | Unit office of the RTO |
| TN-31 | Cuddalore | Cuddalore | Villupuram | TNSTC-Villupuram / Cuddalore Region buses are registered here under TN 31 N XXXX. |
| TN-31Y | Neyveli | Cuddalore | Villupuram | Unit office of the RTO |
| TN-31Z | Panruti | Cuddalore | Villupuram | Unit office of the RTO |
| TN-32 | Villupuram | Villupuram | Villupuram | TNSTC-Villupuram / Villupuram Region buses are registered here under TN 32 N XXXX. |
| TN-33 | Erode (East) | Erode | Erode | TNSTC-Coimbatore / Erode Region buses are registered here under TN 33 N XXXX. |
| TN-34 | Tiruchengode | Namakkal | Erode | |
| TN-34M | Kumarapalayam | Namakkal | Erode | Shared series with Tiruchengode |
| TN-36 | Gobichettipalayam | Erode | Erode | |
| TN-36W | Bhavani | Erode | Erode | Unit office of the RTO |
| TN-36Z | Sathyamangalam | Erode | Erode | Unit office of the RTO |
| TN-37 | Coimbatore (South) | Coimbatore | Coimbatore | |
| TN-37Z | Sulur | Coimbatore | Coimbatore | Unit office of the RTO |
| TN-38 | Coimbatore (North) | Coimbatore | Coimbatore | TNSTC-Coimbatore / Coimbatore Region buses are registered here under TN 38 N XXXX. |
| TN-39 | Tirupur (North) | Tirupur | Coimbatore | TNSTC-Coimbatore / Tirupur Region buses are registered here under TN 39 N XXXX. |
| TN-39Z | Avinashi | Tirupur | Coimbatore | Unit office of the RTO |
| TN-40 | Mettupalayam | Coimbatore | Coimbatore | |
| TN-41 | Pollachi | Coimbatore | Coimbatore | |
| TN-41W | Valparai | Coimbatore | Coimbatore | Unit office of the RTO |
| TN-42 | Tirupur (South) | Tirupur | Coimbatore | |
| TN-42Y | Kangayam | Tirupur | Coimbatore | Unit office of the RTO |
| TN-43 | Ooty | Nilgiris | Coimbatore | TNSTC-Coimbatore / Ooty Region buses are registered here under TN 43 N XXXX. |
| TN-43Z | Gudalur | Nilgiris | Coimbatore | Unit office of the RTO |
| TN-45 | Tiruchirapalli (West) | Tiruchirapalli | Tiruchirapalli | Tnstc-Kumbakonam / Tiruchirapalli Region buses are registered here under TN 45 N XXXX. |
| TN-45Z | Manapparai | Tiruchirapalli | Tiruchirapalli | Unit office of the RTO |
| TN-46 | Perambalur | Perambalur | Tiruchirapalli | |
| TN-47 | Karur | Karur | Tiruchirapalli | |
| TN-47X | Manmangalam | Karur | Tiruchirapalli | Unit office of the RTO |
| TN-47Y | Aravakurichi | Karur | Tiruchirapalli | Unit office of the RTO |
| TN-47Z | Kulithalai | Karur | Tiruchirapalli | Unit office of the RTO |
| TN-48 | Srirangam | Tiruchirapalli | Tiruchirapalli | |
| TN-48X | Lalgudi | Tiruchirapalli | Tiruchirapalli | Unit office of the RTO |
| TN-48Y | Musiri | Tiruchirapalli | Tiruchirapalli | Unit office of the RTO |
| TN-48Z | Thuraiyur | Tiruchirapalli | Tiruchirapalli | Unit office of the RTO |
| TN-49 | Thanjavur | Thanjavur | Thanjavur | |
| TN-49Y | Pattukottai | Thanjavur | Thanjavur | Unit office of the RTO |
| TN-50 | Tiruvarur | Tiruvarur | Thanjavur | |
| TN-50Y | Thiruthuraipoondi | Tiruvarur | Thanjavur | Unit office of the RTO |
| TN-50Z | Mannargudi | Tiruvarur | Thanjavur | Unit office of the RTO |
| TN-51 | Nagapattinam | Nagapattinam | Thanjavur | |
| TN-52 | Sankagiri | Salem | Salem | |
| TN-54 | Salem (East) | Salem | Salem | |
| TN-55 | Pudukottai | Pudukottai | Thanjavur | TNSTC-Kumbakonam / Pudukottai Region buses are registered here under TN 55 N XXXX. |
| TN-55BQ | Alangudi | Pudukottai | Thanjavur | Unit office of the RTO |
| TN-55Y | Iluppur | Pudukottai | Thanjavur | Unit office of the RTO |
| TN-55Z | Aranthangi | Pudukottai | Thanjavur | Unit office of the RTO |
| TN-56 | Perundurai | Erode | Erode | |
| TN-57 | Dindigul | Dindigul | Madurai | TNSTC-Madurai / Dindigul region buses are registered here under TN 57 N XXXX. |
| TN-57W | Natham | Dindigul | Madurai | Unit office of the RTO |
| TN-57V | Vedasandur | Dindigul | Madurai | Unit office of the RTO |
| TN-57W | Batlagundu | Dindigul | Madurai | Unit office of the RTO |
| TN-58 | Madurai (South) | Madurai | Madurai | TNSTC-Madurai / Madurai region buses are registered here under TN 58 N XXXX. |
| TN-58Y | Usilampatti | Madurai | Madurai | Unit office of the RTO |
| TN-58Z | Thirumangalam | Madurai | Madurai | Unit office of the RTO |
| TN-59 | Madurai (North) | Madurai | Madurai | |
| TN-59V | Vadipatti | Madurai | Madurai | Unit office of the RTO |
| TN-59Z | Melur | Madurai | Madurai | Unit office of the RTO |
| TN-60 | Theni | Theni | Madurai | |
| TN-60Z | Uthamapalayam | Theni | Madurai | Unit office of the RTO |
| TN-61 | Ariyalur | Ariyalur | Tiruchirapalli | |
| TN-63 | Sivaganga | Sivaganga | Virudhunagar | |
| TN-63Z | Karaikudi | Sivaganga | Virudhunagar | Unit office of the RTO. TNSTC-Kumbakonam / Karaikudi region buses are registered here under TN 63 N XXXX. |
| TN-64 | Madurai (Central) | Madurai | Madurai | |
| TN-65 | Ramanathapuram | Ramanathapuram | Virudhunagar | |
| TN-65Z | Paramakudi | Ramanathapuram | Virudhunagar | Unit office of the RTO |
| TN-66 | Coimbatore (Central) | Coimbatore | Coimbatore | |
| TN-67 | Virudhunagar | Virudhunagar | Virudhunagar | TNSTC-Madurai / Virudhunagar Region buses are registered here under TN 67 N XXXX. |
| TN-67W | Aruppukottai | Virudhunagar | Virudhunagar | Unit office of the RTO |
| TN-68 | Kumbakonam | Thanjavur | Thanjavur | TNSTC-Kumbakonam / Kumbakonam Region buses are registered here under TN 68 N XXXX. |
| TN-69 | Thoothukudi | Thoothukudi | Tirunelveli | |
| TN-70 | Hosur | Krishnagiri | Vellore | |
| TN-72 | Tirunelveli | Tirunelveli | Tirunelveli | TNSTC-Tirunelveli / Tirunelveli Region buses are registered here under TN 72 N XXXX. |
| TN-72V | Valliyur | Tirunelveli | Tirunelveli | Unit office of the RTO |
| TN-73 | Ranipet | Ranipet | Vellore | |
| TN-73Z | Arakkonam | Ranipet | Vellore | Unit office of the RTO |
| TN-74 | Nagercoil | Kanniyakumari | Tirunelveli | TNSTC-Tirunelveli / Nagercoil region buses are registered here under TN 74 N XXXX. |
| TN-75 | Marthandam | Kanniyakumari | Tirunelveli | |
| TN-76 | Tenkasi | Tenkasi | Tirunelveli | |
| TN-76Y | Ambasamudram | Tirunelveli | Tirunelveli | Unit office of the RTO |
| TN-77 | Attur | Salem | Salem | |
| TN-77Z | Vazhapadi | Salem | Salem | Unit office of the RTO |
| TN-78 | Dharapuram | Tirupur | Coimbatore | |
| TN-78M | Udumalpet | Tirupur | Coimbatore | Shared series with Dharapuram |
| TN-79 | Sankarankovil | Tenkasi | Tirunelveli | |
| TN-81 | Tiruchirapalli (East) | Tiruchirapalli | Tiruchirapalli | |
| TN-81Z | Thiruverumbur | Tiruchirapalli | Tiruchirapalli | Unit office of the RTO |
| TN-82 | Mayiladuthurai | Mayiladuthurai | Thanjavur | |
| TN-82Z | Sirkazhi | Mayiladuthurai | Thanjavur | Unit office of the RTO |
| TN-83 | Vaniyambadi | Thirupattur | Vellore | |
| TN-83M | Thirupattur | Thirupattur | Vellore | Shared series with Vaniyambadi |
| TN-83Y | Ambur | Thirupattur | Vellore | Unit office of the RTO |
| TN-84 | Srivilliputhur | Virudhunagar | Virudhunagar | |
| TN-84U | Rajapalayam | Virudhunagar | Virudhunagar | Unit office of the RTO |
| TN-85 | Kundrathur | Kanchipuram | Chennai South | |
| TN-86 | Erode (West) | Erode | Erode | |
| TN-87 | Sriperumbudur | Kanchipuram | Chennai South | |
| TN-88 | Namakkal (South) | Namakkal | Erode | |
| TN-88Z | Paramathi Velur | Namakkal | Erode | Unit office of the RTO |
| TN-90 | Salem (South) | Salem | Salem | |
| TN-91 | Chidambaram | Cuddalore | Villupuram | |
| TN-91Z | Virudhachalam | Cuddalore | Villupuram | Unit office of the RTO |
| TN-92 | Thiruchendur | Thoothukudi | Tirunelveli | |
| TN-93 | Mettur | Salem | Salem | |
| TN-94 | Palani | Dindigul | Madurai | |
| TN-94Z | Oddanchatram | Dindigul | Madurai | Unit office of the RTO |
| TN-95 | Sivakasi | Virudhunagar | Virudhunagar | |
| TN-96 | Kovilpatti | Thoothukudi | Tirunelveli | |
| TN-97 | Arani | Tiruvannamalai | Villupuram | |
| TN-97Z | Cheyyar | Tiruvannamalai | Villupuram | Unit office of the RTO |
| TN-99 | Coimbatore (West) | Coimbatore | Coimbatore | |

== TR—Tripura ==
| Code | Office location | Jurisdiction area | Annotations |
|---|---|---|---|
| TR-01 | Agartala | West Tripura | |
| TR-02 | Kailasahar | Unakoti | |
| TR-03 | Udaipur | Gomati | |
| TR-04 | Ambassa | Dhalai | |
| TR-05 | Dharmanagar | North Tripura | |
| TR-06 | Teliamura | Khowai | |
| TR-07 | Bishramganj | Sipahijala | |
| TR-08 | Santirbazar | South Tripura | |

== UK—Uttarakhand ==
| Code | Office location | Jurisdiction area | Annotations |
|---|---|---|---|
| UK-01 | Almora | Almora district | |
| UK-02 | Bageshwar | Bageshwar district | |
| UK-03 | Champawat | Champawat district | |
| UK-04 | Haldwani | Nainital district | |
| UK-05 | Pithoragarh | Pithoragarh district | |
| UK-06 | Rudrapur | Udham Singh Nagar district | |
| UK-07 | Dehradun | Dehradun district | |
| UK-08 | Haridwar | Haridwar district | |
| UK-09 | Tehri | Tehri Garhwal district | |
| UK-10 | Uttarkashi | Uttarkashi district | |
| UK-11 | Gopeshwar | Chamoli district | |
| UK-12 | Pauri | Pauri Garhwal district | |
| UK-13 | Rudraprayag | Rudraprayag district | |
| UK-14 | Rishikesh | Dehradun district | |
| UK-15 | Kotdwar | Pauri Garhwal district | |
| UK-16 | Vikasnagar | Dehradun district | |
| UK-17 | Roorkee | Haridwar district | |
| UK-18 | Kashipur | Udham Singh Nagar district | |
| UK-19 | Ramnagar | Nainital District | |
| UK-20 | Ranikhet | Almora District | |

== UP—Uttar Pradesh ==
| Code | Office location | Jurisdiction area | Annotations |
|---|---|---|---|
| UP-1 to UP-10 | Defunct | Defunct | Codes were allocated to districts which are now part of Uttarakhand. |
| UP-11 | Saharanpur | Saharanpur district | |
| UP-12 | Muzaffarnagar | Muzaffarnagar district | |
| UP-13 | Bulandshahr | Bulandshahr district | |
| UP-14 | Ghaziabad | Ghaziabad district | |
| UP-15 | Meerut | Meerut district | |
| UP-16 | Noida | Gautam Buddha Nagar district | |
| UP-17 | Baghpat | Bagpat district | |
| UP-19 | Shamli | Shamli district | |
| UP-20 | Bijnor | Bijnor district | |
| UP-21 | Moradabad | Moradabad district | 21G for government vehicles, 21N for commercial vehicles |
| UP-22 | Rampur | Rampur district | 22G for government vehicles, 22T for commercial vehicles |
| UP-23 | Amroha | Amroha district | |
| UP-24 | Badaun | Badaun district | |
| UP-25 | Bareilly | Bareilly district | |
| UP-26 | Pilibhit | Pilibhit district | |
| UP-27 | Shahjahanpur | Shahjahanpur district | |
| UP-30 | Hardoi | Hardoi district | |
| UP-31 | Lakhimpur | Lakhimpur Kheri district | |
| UP-32 | Lucknow | Lucknow district | Trans Gomti Vistar Patal Lucknow |
| UP-33 | Raebareli | Raebareli district | |
| UP-34 | Sitapur | Sitapur district | |
| UP-35 | Unnao | Unnao district | |
| UP-36 | Amethi | Amethi district | |
| UP-37 | Hapur | Hapur district | |
| UP-38 | Bahjoi | Sambhal district | |
| UP-40 | Bahraich | Bahraich district | |
| UP-41 | Barabanki | Barabanki district | |
| UP-42 | Ayodhya | Ayodhya district | |
| UP-43 | Gonda | Gonda district | |
| UP-44 | Sultanpur | Sultanpur district | |
| UP-45 | Akbarpur | Ambedkar Nagar | |
| UP-46 | Shravasti | Shravasti district | |
| UP-47 | Balrampur | Balrampur district | |
| UP-50 | Azamgarh | Azamgarh district | |
| UP-51 | Basti | Basti district | |
| UP-52 | Deoria | Deoria district | |
| UP-53 | Gorakhpur | Gorakhpur district | |
| UP-54 | Mau | Mau district | |
| UP-55 | Siddharthnagar | Siddharth Nagar | |
| UP-56 | Maharajganj | Maharajganj district | |
| UP-57 | Padrauna | Kushinagar district | |
| UP-58 | Khalilabad | Sant Kabir Nagar | |
| UP-60 | Ballia | Ballia district | |
| UP-61 | Ghazipur | Ghazipur district | |
| UP-62 | Jaunpur | Jaunpur district | |
| UP-63 | Mirzapur | Mirzapur district | |
| UP-64 | Robertsganj | Sonbhadra district | |
| UP-65 | Varanasi | Varanasi district | |
| UP-66 | Gyanpur | Bhadohi district | |
| UP-67 | Chandauli | Chandauli district | |
| UP-70 | Prayagraj | Prayagraj district | |
| UP-71 | Fatehpur | Fatehpur district | |
| UP-72 | Pratapgarh | Pratapgarh district | |
| UP-73 | Manjhanpur | Kaushambi | |
| UP-74 | Kannauj | Kannauj district | |
| UP-75 | Etawah | Etawah district | |
| UP-76 | Farrukhabad | Farrukhabad district | |
| UP-77 | Akbarpur | Kanpur Dehat district | |
| UP-78 | Kanpur | Kanpur Nagar district | |
| UP-79 | Auraiya | Auraiya district | |
| UP-80 | Agra | Agra district | |
| UP-81 | Aligarh | Aligarh district | |
| UP-82 | Etah | Etah district | |
| UP-83 | Firozabad | Firozabad district | |
| UP-84 | Mainpuri | Mainpuri district | |
| UP-85 | Mathura | Mathura district | |
| UP-86 | Hathras | Hathras district | |
| UP-87 | Kasganj | Kasganj district | |
| UP-90 | Banda | Banda district | |
| UP-91 | Hamirpur | Hamirpur district | |
| UP-92 | Jalaun | Jalaun district | |
| UP-93 | Jhansi | Jhansi district | |
| UP-94 | Lalitpur | Lalitpur district | |
| UP-95 | Mahoba | Mahoba district | |
| UP-96 | Chitrakoot Dham | Chitrakoot district | |

== WB—West Bengal ==
| Code | Office location | Jurisdiction area | Annotations |
|---|---|---|---|
| WB-01 | Beltala (two Wheelers) | Kolkata district | however series starting from WB-01BB is new series for both Commercial and Private vehicles under One RTO One Code initiative |
| WB-02 | Beltala (four Wheelers private vehicles) | Kolkata district | Discontinued, as WB-01BB is new code for all types of Commercial and Private vehicles under Beltala RTO |
| WB-03 | Beltala (commercial goods carriages) | Kolkata district | Discontinued, as WB-01BB is new code for all types of Commercial and Private vehicles under Beltala RTO |
| WB-04 | Beltala (commercial passenger vehicles) | Kolkata district | WB-01BB is new code for all types of Commercial and Private vehicles under Beltala RTO |
| WB-05 | Kasba (commercial vehicles) | Kolkata district | however, WB-05B is the new code for both Commercial and Private vehicles under One RTO One Code initiative |
| WB-06 | Kasba (private vehicles) | Kolkata district | series starts from (WB-06K); however, from WB-06 until WB-06J registered in Beltala RTO as private four-wheelers; series discontinued after WB-06AC WB-05B is the new code for both Commercial and Private vehicles under One RTO One Code initiative |
| WB-07 | Salt Lake (commercial vehicles) | Kolkata district | series starts from (WB-07J); however, from WB-07 until WB-07H registered in Kolkata RTO as two-wheelers; series discontinued after WB-07K as it has been replaced by WB-07V |
| WB-08 | Salt Lake (private vehicles) | Kolkata district | Series replaced by WB-07V (after WB-08S) as WB-07V is the new code for both Commercial and Private vehicles; some government vehicles have been registered under WB-08T |
| WB-09 | Behala (commercial vehicles) | Kolkata district | however, series replaced by WB-09B under One RTO One Code initiative of WB Transport Department |
| WB-10 | Behala (private vehicles) | Kolkata district | however, series replaced by WB-09B under One RTO One Code initiative of WB Transport Department |
| WB-11 | Howrah (commercial vehicles) | Howrah district | however, series replaced by WB-11H under One RTO One Code initiative of WB Transport Department |
| WB-12 | Howrah (private vehicles) | Howrah district | however, series replaced by WB-11H under One RTO One Code initiative of WB Transport Department |
| WB-13 | Uluberia (commercial vehicles) | Howrah district | however, series replaced by WB-13B under One RTO One Code initiative of WB Transport Department |
| WB-14 | Uluberia (private vehicles) | Howrah district | series starts from (WB14K); however from WB-14E until WB-14L Two-wheelers are registered under Howrah RTO however, series replaced by WB-13B under One RTO One Code initiative of WB Transport Department |
| WB-15 | Chinsurah (commercial vehicles) | Hooghly district | Replaced by series starting with WB-15E under One RTO One Code initiative |
| WB-16 | Chinsurah (private vehicles) | Hooghly district | discontinued and replaced by series starting with WB-15E under One RTO One Code initiative |
| WB-17 | Serampore (commercial vehicles) | Hooghly district | From WB17N it is Arambagh ARTO |
| WB-18 | Serampore (private vehicles) | Hooghly district | series starts from (WB18K); however from WB-18 until WB-18G registered in Chinsurah RTO as private vehicles. WB-18 series discontinued after WB-18AM and replaced by series starting with WB-17B under One RTO One Code initiative. Series from WB-18TA registered in Arambagh arto as private vehicles WB-18TA series discontinued after WB-18TF and replaced by WB-17N under One RTO One Code initiative |
| WB-19 | Alipore (commercial vehicles) | South 24 Parganas district | however, series starting with WB-19P is now used for both Private and Commercial vehicles under One RTO One Code initiative of WB Transport Department |
| WB-20 | Alipore (private vehicles) | South 24 Parganas district | Discontinued and replaced by series starting with WB-19P |
| WB-21 | Basirhat (commercial vehicles) | North 24 Parganas district | Common series for private and commercial vehicles starts from WB-21A under One RTO One Code initiative of WB Transport Department |
| WB-22 | Basirhat (private vehicles) | North 24 Parganas district | Common series for private and commercial vehicles starts from WB-21A under One RTO One Code initiative of WB Transport Department, however WB-22U registered in Alipore RTO as private vehicle |
| WB-23 | Barrackpore (commercial vehicles) | North 24 Parganas district | series starting from WB-23H applies for both Private and Commercial vehicles |
| WB-24 | Barrackpore (private vehicles) | North 24 Parganas district | Now discontinued and replaced by series starting from WB-23H |
| WB-25 | Barasat (commercial vehicles) | North 24 Parganas district | however, series replaced by WB-25N for both Commercial and Private vehicles under One RTO One Code initiative of WB Transport Department |
| WB-26 | Barasat (private vehicles) | North 24 Parganas district | however, series replaced by WB-25N for both Commercial and Private vehicles (after WB-26CC) under One RTO One Code initiative of WB Transport Department |
| WB-27 | Bangaon (commercial vehicles) | North 24 Parganas district | |
| WB-28 | Bangaon (private vehicles) | North 24 Parganas district | |
| WB-29 | Tamluk (commercial vehicles) | Purba Medinipur district | |
| WB-30 | Tamluk (private vehicles) | Purba Medinipur district | |
| WB-31 | Contai (commercial vehicles) | Purba Medinipur district | However series starts from WB-31N are registered under Haldia ARTO as commercial vehicles; WB-31 discontinued in Contai and replaced by WB-32 for both Private and Commercial vehicles |
| WB-32 | Contai (private vehicles) | Purba Medinipur district | However series starts from WB-32N are registered under Haldia ARTO as private vehicles; WB-32 now applies for both Private and Commercial vehicles under One RTO One Code initiative |
| WB-33 | Medinipur (commercial vehicles) | Paschim Medinipur district | |
| WB-34 | Medinipur (private vehicles) | Paschim Medinipur district | |
| WB-35 | Kharagpur (commercial vehicles) | Paschim Medinipur district | |
| WB-36 | Kharagpur (private vehicles) | Paschim Medinipur district | |
| WB-37 | Asansol (commercial vehicles) | Paschim Bardhaman district | |
| WB-38 | Asansol (private vehicles) | Paschim Bardhaman district | |
| WB-39 | Durgapur (commercial vehicles), also SBSTC buses are registered here. | Paschim Bardhaman district | |
| WB-40 | Durgapur (private vehicles) | Paschim Bardhaman district | |
| WB-41 | Bardhaman (commercial vehicles) | Purba Bardhaman district | |
| WB-42 | Bardhaman (private vehicles) | Purba Bardhaman district | |
| WB-43 | Kalna (commercial vehicles) | Purba Bardhaman district | |
| WB-44 | Kalna (private vehicles) | Purba Bardhaman district | However WB44-44D is registered at Asansol ARTO. |
| WB-45 | Rampurhat (commercial vehicles) | Birbhum district | |
| WB-46 | Rampurhat (private vehicles) | Birbhum district | |
| WB-47 | Bolpur (commercial vehicles) | Birbhum district | |
| WB-48 | Bolpur (private vehicles) | Birbhum district | |
| WB-49 | Jhargram (commercial vehicles) | Jhargram district | However series starts from WB-49N are registered under Ghatal arto as commercial vehicles |
| WB-50 | Jhargram (private vehicles) | Jhargram district | However series starts from WB-50N are registered under Ghatal as private vehicles |
| WB-51 | Krishnanagar (commercial vehicles) | Nadia district | |
| WB-52 | Krishnanagar (private vehicles) | Nadia district | However series starts from WB-52JA is registered at Tehatta ARTO |
| WB-53 | Birbhum (commercial vehicles) | Birbhum district | |
| WB-54 | Birbhum (private vehicles) | Birbhum district | |
| WB-55 | Purulia (commercial vehicles) | Purulia district | |
| WB-56 | Purulia (private vehicles) | Purulia district | |
| WB-57 | Murshidabad (commercial vehicles) | Murshidabad district | |
| WB-58 | Murshidabad (private vehicles) | Murshidabad district | |
| WB-59 | Raiganj (commercial vehicles) | Uttar Dinajpur district | |
| WB-60 | Raiganj (private vehicles) | Uttar Dinajpur district | |
| WB-61 | Balurghat (commercial vehicles) | Dakshin Dinajpur district | |
| WB-62 | Balurghat (private vehicles) | Dakshin Dinajpur district | |
| WB-63 | Cooch Behar (commercial vehicles), also NBSTC buses are registered here. | Cooch Behar district | |
| WB-64 | Cooch Behar (private vehicles) | Cooch Behar district | |
| WB-65 | Malda City (commercial vehicles) | Malda district | |
| WB-66 | Malda City (private vehicles) | Malda district | |
| WB-67 | Bankura (commercial vehicles) | Bankura district | |
| WB-68 | Bankura (private vehicles) | Bankura district | |
| WB-69 | Alipurduar (commercial vehicles) | Alipurduar district | |
| WB-70 | Alipurduar (private vehicles) | Alipurduar district | |
| WB-71 | Jalpaiguri (commercial vehicles) | Jalpaiguri district | |
| WB-72 | Jalpaiguri (private vehicles) | Jalpaiguri district | |
| WB-73 | Siliguri (commercial vehicles) | Darjeeling district | Replaced by series starting with WB-73K under One RTO One Code initiative |
| WB-74 | Siliguri (private vehicles) | Darjeeling district | Replaced by series starting with WB-73K under One RTO One Code initiative |
| WB-75 | Katwa (private and commercial vehicles) | Purba Bardhaman district | |
| WB-76 | Darjeeling (commercial vehicles) | Darjeeling district | |
| WB-77 | Darjeeling (private vehicles) | Darjeeling district | |
| WB-78 | Kalimpong (commercial vehicles) | Kalimpong district | |
| WB-79 | Kalimpong (private vehicles) | Kalimpong district | |
| WB-80 | Manbazar (private and commercial vehicles) | Purulia district | |
| WB-81 | Raghunathpur (commercial vehicles) | Purulia district | |
| WB-82 | Raghunathpur (private vehicles) | Purulia district | |
| WB-83 | Chanchal (commercial vehicles) | Malda district | |
| WB-84 | Chanchal (private vehicles) | Malda district | |
| WB-85 | Mathabhanga (commercial vehicles) | Cooch Behar district | |
| WB-86 | Mathabhanga (private vehicles) | Cooch Behar district | |
| WB-87 | Bishnupur (commercial vehicles) | Bankura district | |
| WB-88 | Bishnupur (private vehicles) | Bankura district | |
| WB-89 | Kalyani (commercial vehicles) | Nadia district | |
| WB-90 | Kalyani (private vehicles) | Nadia district | |
| WB-91 | Islampur (commercial vehicles) | Uttar Dinajpur district | |
| WB-92 | Islampur (private vehicles) | Uttar Dinajpur district | |
| WB-93 | Jangipur (commercial vehicles) | Murshidabad district | |
| WB-94 | Jangipur (private vehicles) | Murshidabad district | |
| WB-95 | Baruipur (commercial vehicles) | South 24 Parganas district | Common series for private and commercial vehicles starts from WB-95C under One RTO One Code initiative of WB Transport Department |
| WB-96 | Baruipur (private vehicles) | South 24 Parganas district | Common series for private and commercial vehicles starts from WB-95C under One RTO One Code initiative of WB Transport Department |
| WB-97 | Diamond Harbour (commercial vehicles) | South 24 Parganas district | Common series for private and commercial vehicles starts from WB-97B under One RTO One Code initiative of WB Transport Department |
| WB-98 | Canning (All vehicles) | South 24 Parganas district | Series start from WB-98AA registered under Canning ARTO From July 2025 |
| WB-99 | Kandi (Private and Commercial vehicles) | Murshidabad district | |

== Sources ==
- for India as whole: Ministry of Road Transport and Highways (click on "List of RTO's in a State")
- for Andhra Pradesh: Government of Andhra Pradesh – Transport Department
- for Delhi: Department of Transport
- for Gujarat: Transport Department Gujarat
- for Himachal Pradesh: Transport Department
- for Karnataka: Government of Karnataka – Transport Department
- for Kerala: Motor Vehicles Department, Newspaper article in the Hindu: "New Registering Authority Codes from July 1"
- for Madhya Pradesh: RTO Offices in MP
- for Maharashtra: Motor Vehicle Department
- for Orissa: Orissa Commerce & Transport Department
- for Punjab: Government of Punjab – Department of Transport
- For Rajasthan: transport.Rajasthan.gov
- for Tamil Nadu: Department of Transport, State Transport Authority, GIS representation
- for Telangana: Telangana Transport Information Portal
- for Uttarakhand: Uttarakhand Transport Department.
