= Pilibanga Assembly constituency =

Constituency of the Rajasthan legislative assembly in India

Coordinates: 29.49°N 74.07°E

Pilibanga
- Constituency No. 9 for the Rajasthan Legislative Assembly

Constituency details
- Country: India
- Region: North India
- State: Rajasthan
- District: Hanumangarh district
- Established: 1977
- Reservation: SC

Member of Legislative Assembly
- 16th Rajasthan Legislative Assembly
- Incumbent Vinod Gothwal
- Party: Indian National Congress
- Elected year: 2023

Pilibanga Assembly constituency is one of constituencies of Rajasthan Legislative Assembly in the Ganganagar Lok Sabha constituency.

Pilibanga constituency covers all voters from Pilibanga tehsil; parts of Rawatsar tehsil, which include ILRC Rawatsar including Rawatsar Municipal Board, ILRC Khoda, ILRC Gandheli; and part of Hanumangarh tehsil, which includes ILRC Dablirathan.

== Members of Assembly ==
Year	Name	Party
1977	Harchand Singh Sidhu	Janata Party
1980	Jeev Raj Singh	Indian National Congress
1985	Jeev Raj Singh	Indian National Congress
1990	Ram Pratap Kasaniya	Independent
1993	Ram Pratap Kasaniya	Bharatiya Janata Party
1998	Harchand Singh Sidhu	Indian National Congress
2003	Ram Pratap Kasaniya	Independent politician
2008	Aad Ram	Indian National Congress
2013	Dropati	Bharatiya Janata Party
2018	Dharmendra Kumar	Bharatiya Janata Party
2023	Vinod Kumar Gothwal	Indian National Congress

== Election results ==
=== 2023 ===
2023 Rajasthan Legislative Assembly election: Pilibanga
Party	Candidate	Votes	%	±%
INC	Vinod Kumar	143,091	57.84	+10.92
BJP	Dharmendra Kumar	87,818	35.5	−11.54
RLP	Sunil Kumar	10,525	4.25	
NOTA	None of the above	1,553	0.63	−0.45
Majority		55,273	22.34	+22.22
Turnout		247,404	83.3	−1.3
INC gain from BJP		Swing		

=== 2018 ===
2018 Rajasthan Legislative Assembly election: Pilibanga
Party	Candidate	Votes	%	±%
BJP	Dharmendra Kumar	106,414	47.04	
INC	Vinod Kumar	106,136	46.92	
BSP	Sushil Kumar	3,523	1.56	
CPI(M)	Mani Ram	2,659	1.18	
NOTA	None of the above	2,441	1.08	
Majority		278	0.12	
Turnout		226,217	84.6	
BJP gain from		Swing		

== See also ==
- Member of the Legislative Assembly (India)
