= Dhaban =

Dhaban 6 BGP-A
- Village
- Country: India
- State: Rajasthan
- District: Hanumangarh

Population (2011)
  - Total: 7,671

Languages
  - Official: Hindi Bagri punjabi
- Time zone: UTC+5:30 (IST)
- PIN: 335063
- Telephone code: 01499280
- ISO 3166 code: RJ-IN
- Vehicle registration: RJ-31
- Coastline: 0 kilometres (0 mi)
- Nearest city: Sangaria

Dhaban is a village in Sangaria Tehsil in Hanumangarh District of Rajasthan State, India. It belongs to Bikaner Division . It is located 39 km towards North from District headquarters Hanumangarh. 12 km from Sangaria. 413 km from State capital Jaipur. Co-ordinates of village main bus stand 29°52'34.8"N 74°30'33.3"E.
