= Chhani Bari =

- Village
- Location in Rajasthan, India Chhani Bari (India)
- Coordinates: 29°11′0″N 75°20′0″E
- Country: India
- State: Rajasthan
- District: Hanumangarh

Languages
  - Official: Hindi
- Time zone: UTC+5:30 (IST)
- PIN: 335511
- Telephone code: 01504
- Nearest city: Hisar

Chhani Bari is a village in the Hanumangarh district of Rajasthan state in India. It is in the Bhadra mandal and is a sub-tehsil in Bhadra Tehsil. Chhani Bari is situated at a distance of about 18.7 km from its mandal headquarters Bhadra, 148 km from the district headquarters of Hanumangarh and 336 km away from the state capital of Jaipur. Hisar is the closest commercial center.

== Transportation ==
Chhani Bari can be reached by a number of bus routes. Some long route buses start from Chhani Bari for Jaipur, Bikaner, Suratgarh and Hanumangarh. The village has become a small commercial hub in the nearby area after Bhadra because of internal markets being developed.

Due to the village's large population of over 2000+ homes, there are three bus stops: Tehsil, Village Center and Main Bus Stand.

There is an Army Radar in the village. Many telecommunication companies have installed towers across the town.

== Language ==
The official language of Chhani Bari is Hindu, but the regional language in Chhani Bari is Bagri. Chhani Bari is home to a wide array of accents not native to the village.

== Agriculture ==
Crops like wheat, cotton, and vegetables are grown on the farms. To assist with farming, a canal handles the irrigation supply

 In Chhani Bari here a manufacturer unit of biomass briquettes which are made from mustard husk and name of manufacturer unit is SRP GREENTECH which is located between Sarswati school and Chanduram college distance from village is less than 1 km

== Location ==
The village is located on the Bhadra-Mandi Adampur route in the Hanumangarh district of Rajasthan state in India. Chhani Bari is situated at a distance of about 18.7 km from its mandal headquarters Bhadra, 148 km from the district headquarters of Hanumangarh and 336 km away from the state capital of Jaipur.

== Villages ==
Some neighbouring villages include; Janana, Jhansal, Biran, Sherda, Bhirani, Sherpura, Chuli kalan, Ninan, Sagra, Ramgadhiya, Swai chhani, Bharun chhani, Ber Garhi Chhani, Bhadra, Ajeet Pura, Mehrana and Ber.

== Educational Institutions ==
Nearby schools include:

- Government Senior Secondary School
- Government Girl's Secondary School
- Arya Sen. Secondary school
- Bal Bharti Sen. Secondary school
- Dev Public School
- Mother Care Secondary School
- Saraswati Senior Secondary School
- Bright Children Secondary School (English Medium)

Nearby colleges include:

- Jaharveer Goga Ji Girls College
- Chanduram Suthar Memorial
- Sarswati Girl's College
- Suraj Computer Technical Institute
- Rotash Bansakl
