= Deengarh =

Deengarh is a village under Sangaria tehsil in Hanumangarh District, Rajasthan, India. It belongs to Bikaner Division. It is 416 km from the state capital at Jaipur, 39 km north of the district headquarters at Hanumangarh and 10 km from Sangaria. Nearby railway stations are Dhaban and Sangaria.

== Nearby places ==
- Haripura- 6 km
- Bolanwali- 8 km
- Sangaria- 10 km
- Mala Rampura- 11 km
- Nathwana- 12 km

Deengarh is about 13 km from the state border with Haryana.

== Education ==
=== Schools and colleges (in nearby Sangaria) ===
- Gramotthan Vidyapeeth College of Education
- Manav Mangal College Of Education
- Meera Kanya P.g. Mahavidyalaya
- GV Home Science College
- Khalsa Public Senior Secondary School (in Morjand Sikhan)
- Saraswati Vidya Niketan Girls College (in Hanumangarh)
