= Birkali =

- Village
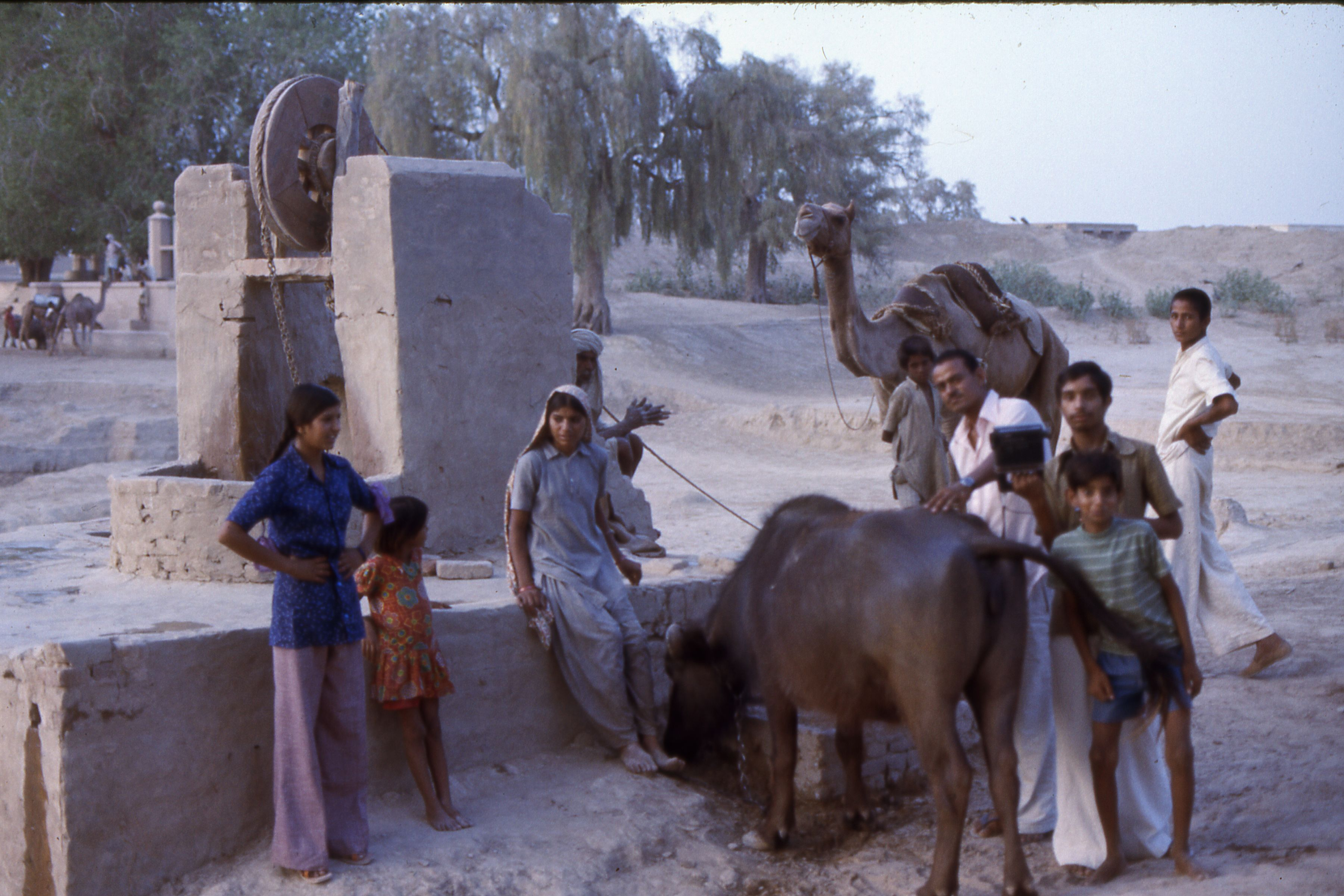
- Birkali village water well, 1977

- Location in Rajasthan, India Birkali (India)
- Coordinates: 29.1500°N 74.5833°E
- Country: India
- State: Rajasthan
- District: Hanumangarh
- Elevation: 184 m (604 ft)

Population (2011)
  - Total: 5,100

Languages
  - Official: Hindi Bagri
- Time zone: UTC+5:30 (IST)
- Postal code: 335523

Birkali is a village in the state of Rajasthan, India.

Birkali was established by Sultan Singh Ji of Bhukarka in 1758 as a "Ek lari jageer". It is inhabited by over 5,000 residents with many from the Bika Rajput clan. Birkali is approximately 14 miles west of Nohar and 50 miles south of Hanumangarh. Birkali is an agricultural community with no industry to speak of. The main crops in the summer months are Bajari, Moath, and Guar. The main crops in the winter months are Sarson (Mustard oil, Mustard seed), and Channe.

== Geography ==
Birkali is located at 29.15°N 74.58°E. It has an average elevation of 184 metres (606 feet).

To the north of Birkali is Gandheli, Laalpura, Sardarpura, Kanwani, Thalarka, Chayia, Ellenabad. To the west of Birkali is, Munsari, Nolkhi, Purabsar, Baramsar, Pallu. To the south is Nannau, Chilasari, Mandarpura. To the east is Asarjaana, Sonri, Maaliya, Nohar, Deeplana, Jasaana, Phephaana, Gogameri, Ramgarh, Bhaadra.

== Climate ==
Birkali is at the north eastern edge of the Thar Desert, the surrounding area is predominantly covered with sand dunes.

Birkali

Climate chart (precipitation, max. and min. temperature)
J	F	M	A	M	J	J	A	S	O	N	D
9 14 3	9 18 5	8 24 12	2 35 19	10 41 26	20 36 27	92 36 27	97 34 26	49 35 22	12 30 15	4 26 11	4 13 5
- █ Average max. and min. temperatures in °C
- █ Precipitation totals in mm
Imperial conversion
J	F	M	A	M	J	J	A	S	O	N	D
0.4 57 38	0.4 64 41	0.3 75 53	0.1 95 66	0.4 106 79	0.8 97 80	3.6 96 81	3.8 92 79	1.9 96 72	0.5 86 59	0.2 78 51	0.2 56 41
- █ Average max. and min. temperatures in °F
- █ Precipitation totals in inches

== Wildlife ==
Birkali has many exotic animals in its realm such as the Camel, Peacock, and Nilgai.

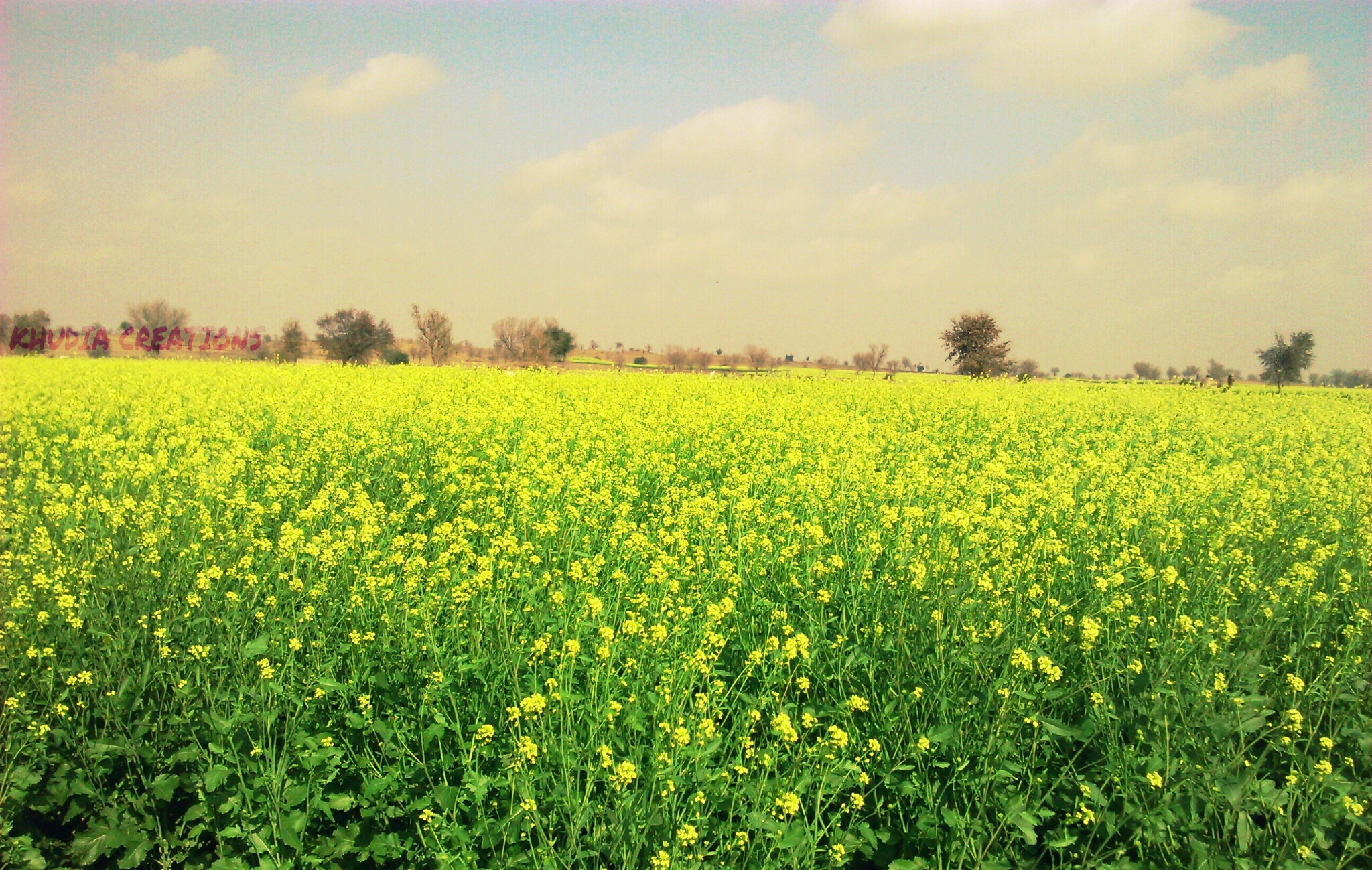
Harvest of Mustard

== People ==
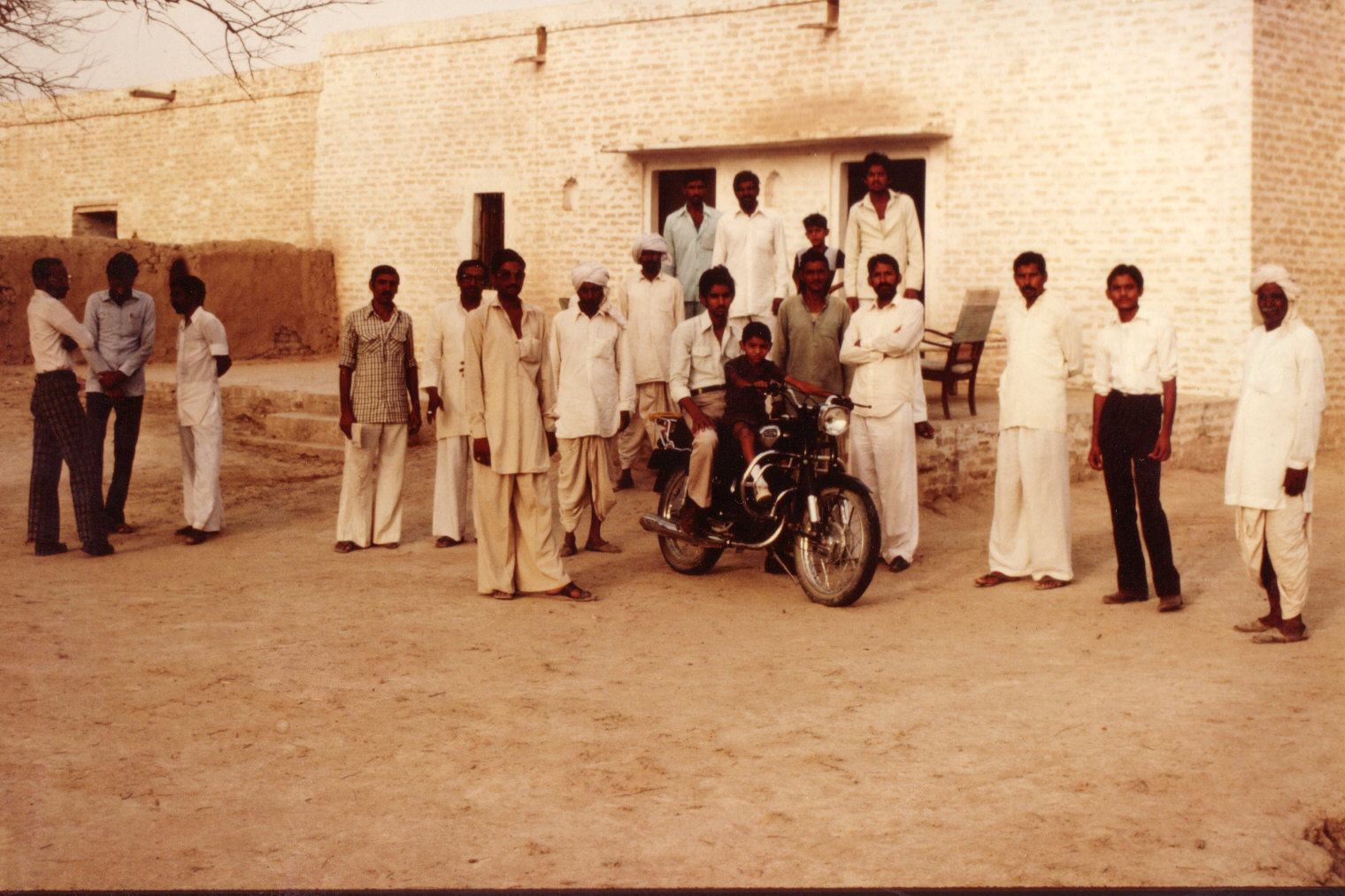
Birkali 1985

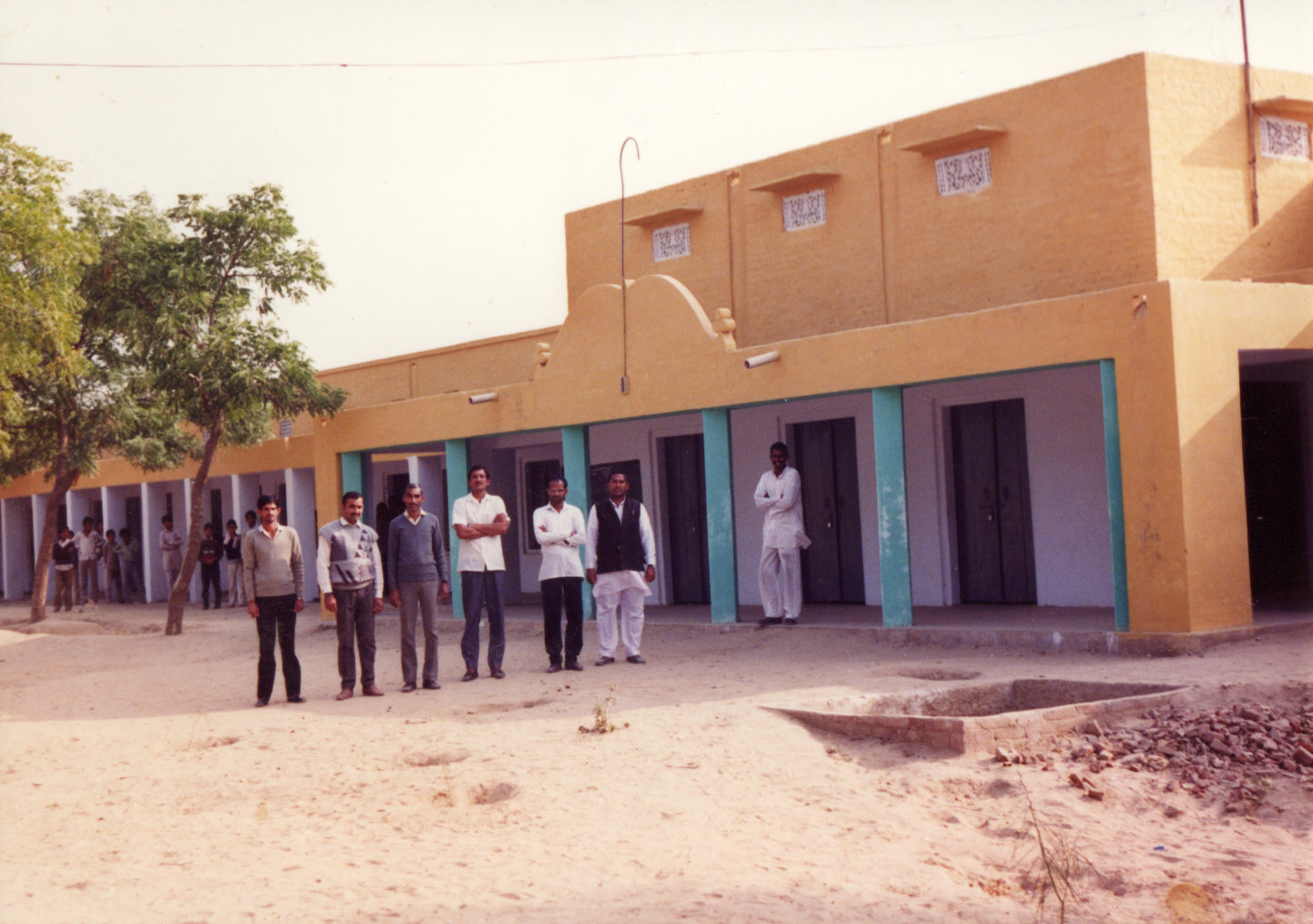
High School Staff 1991

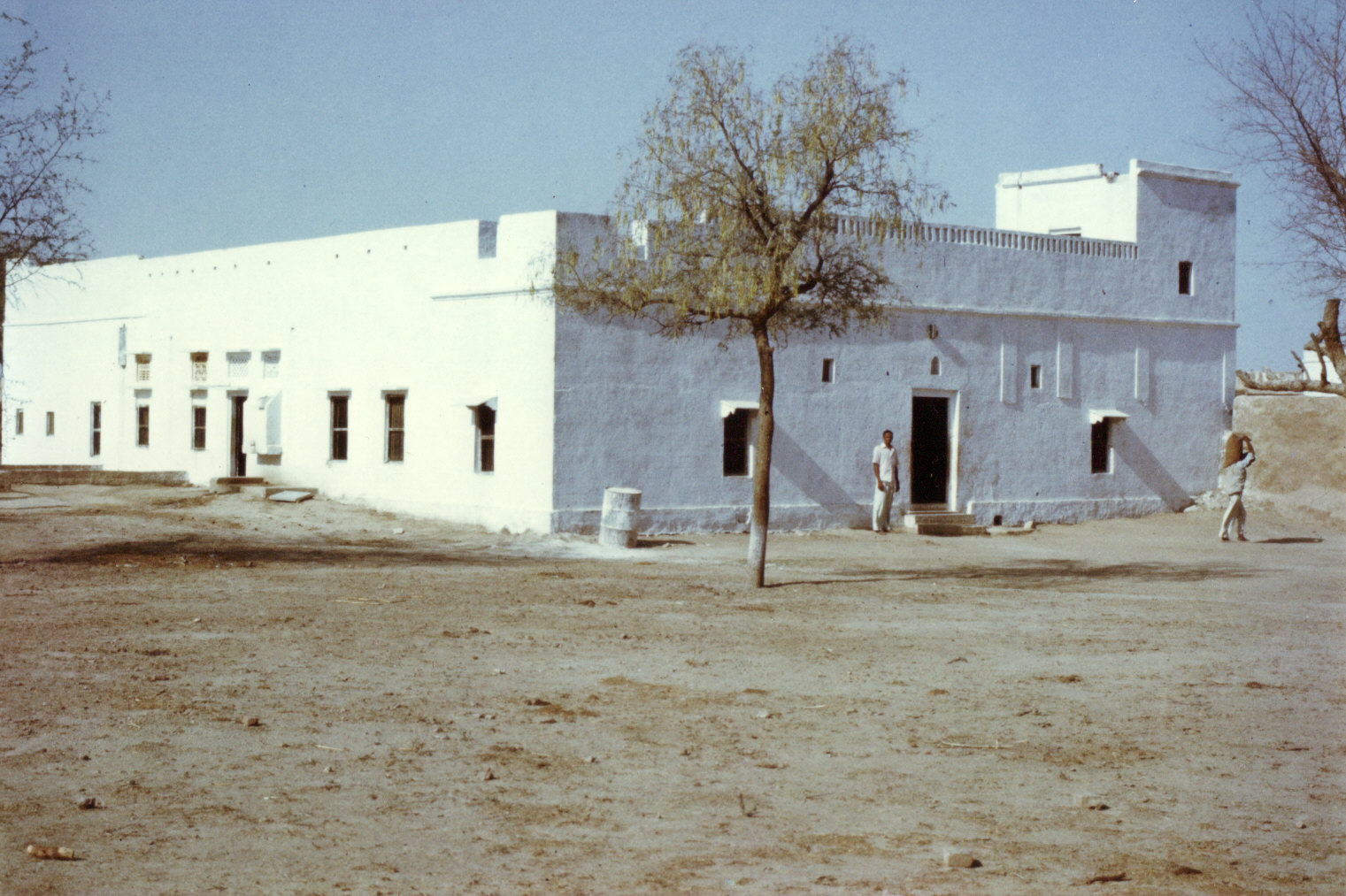
Haveli

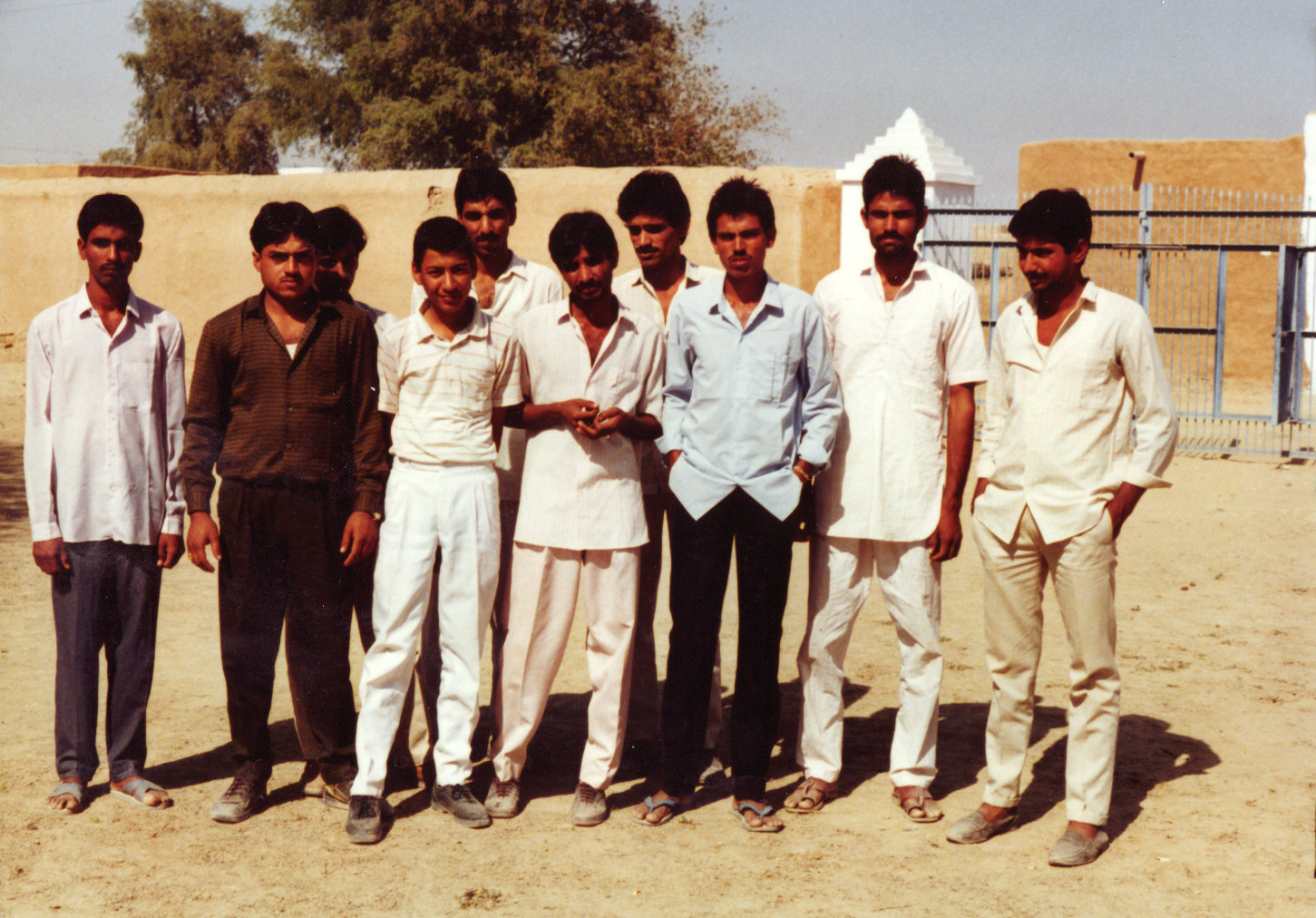
High School Students

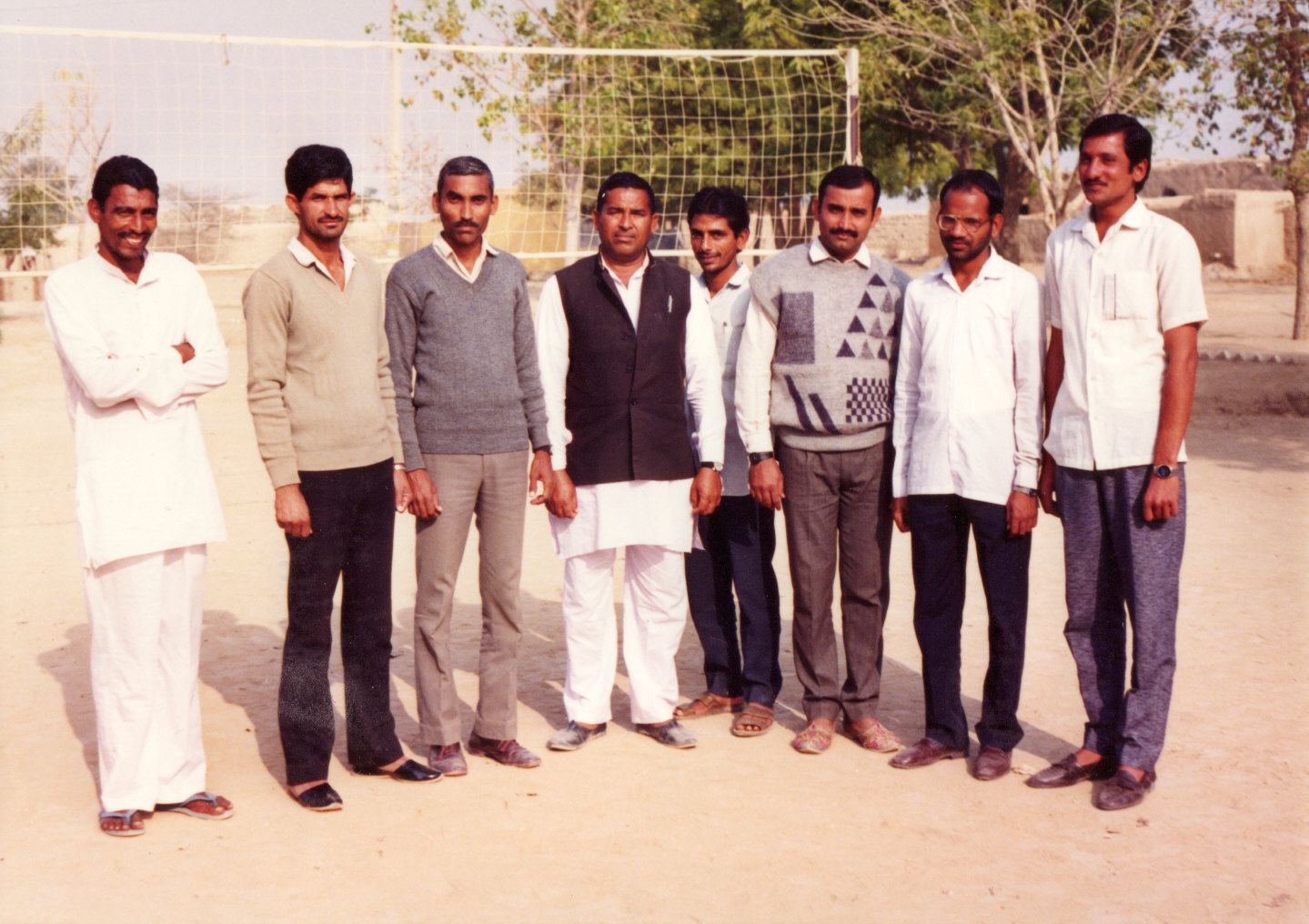
High School Staff 1991

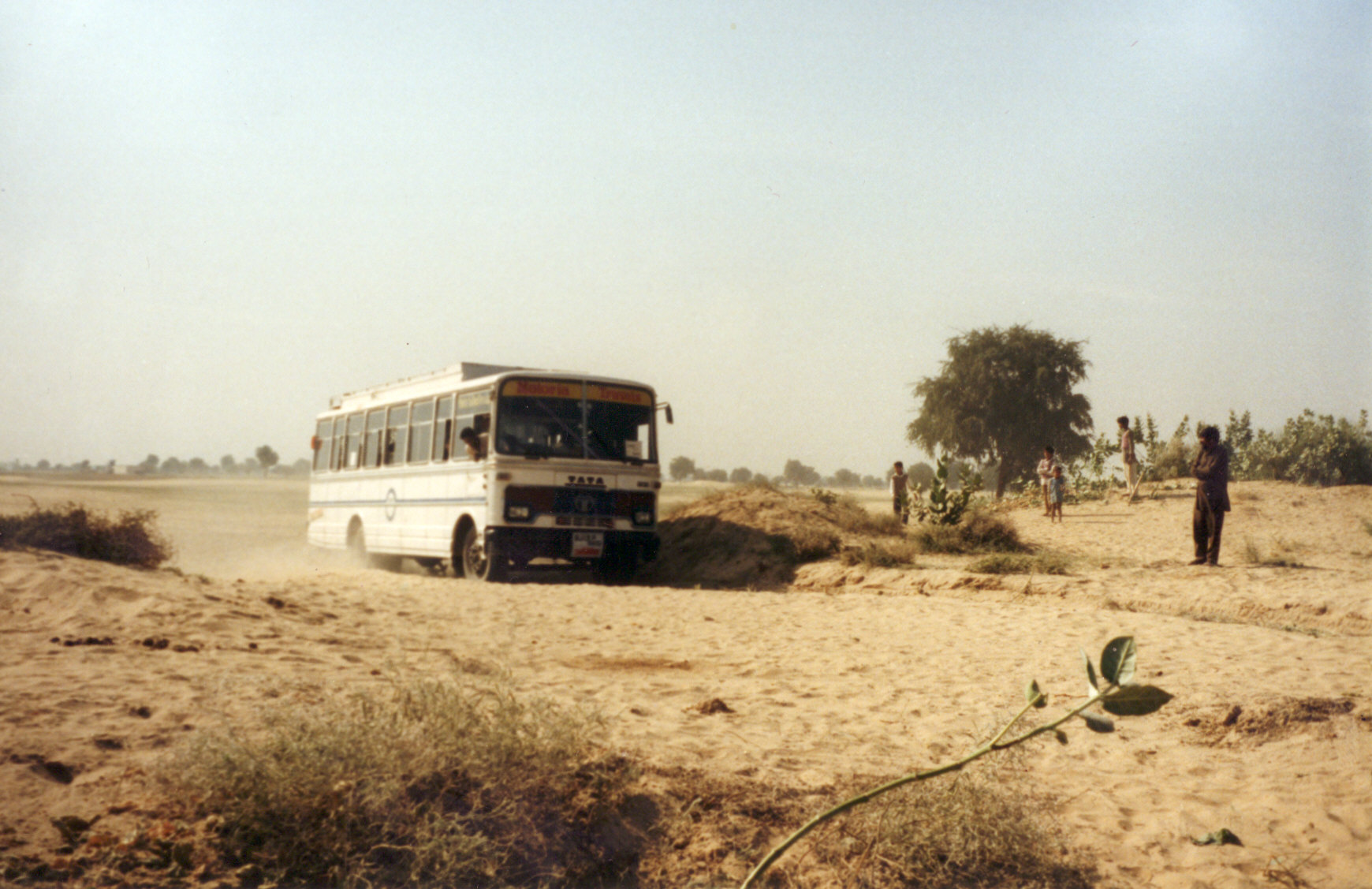
Bus

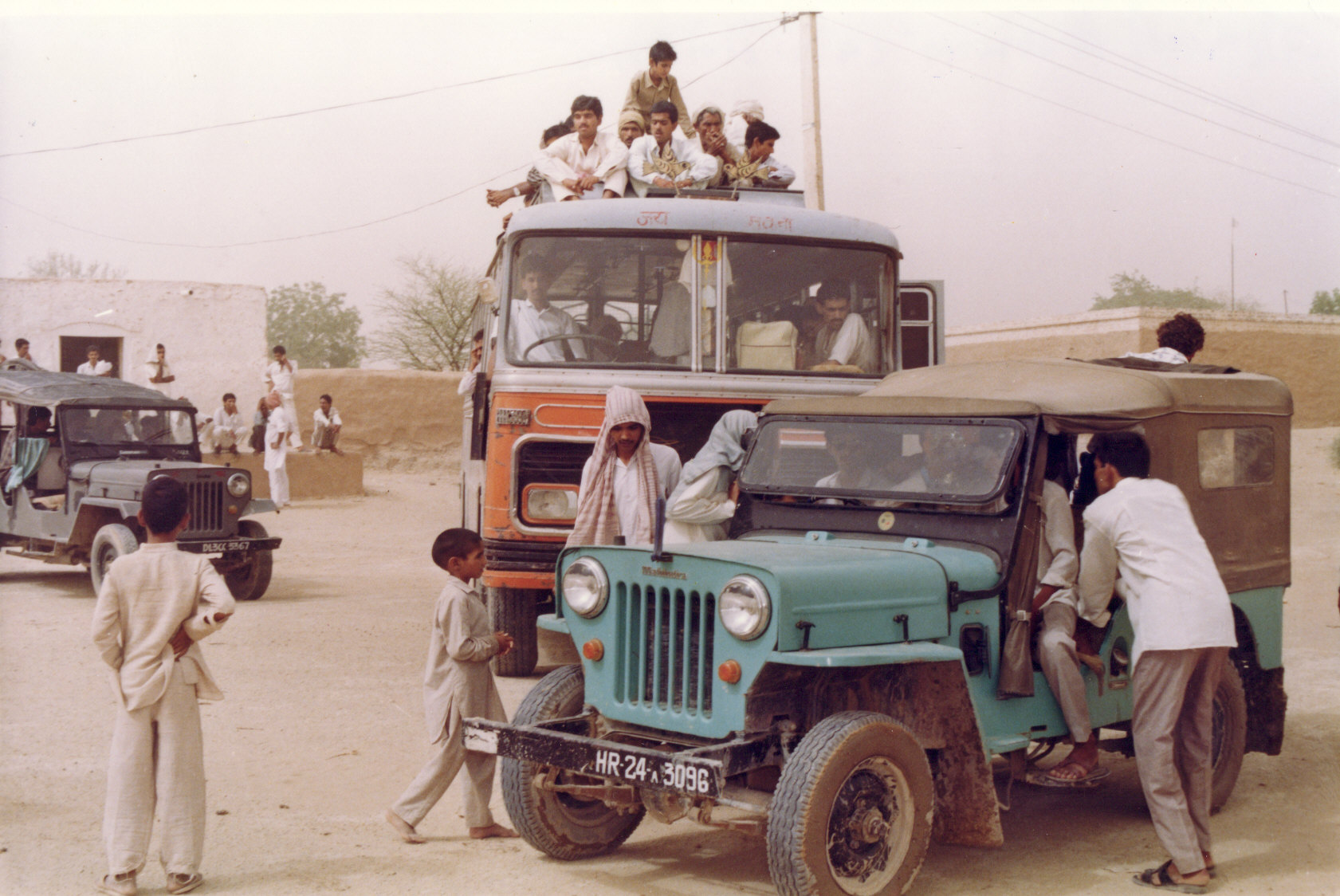
Bus Stand

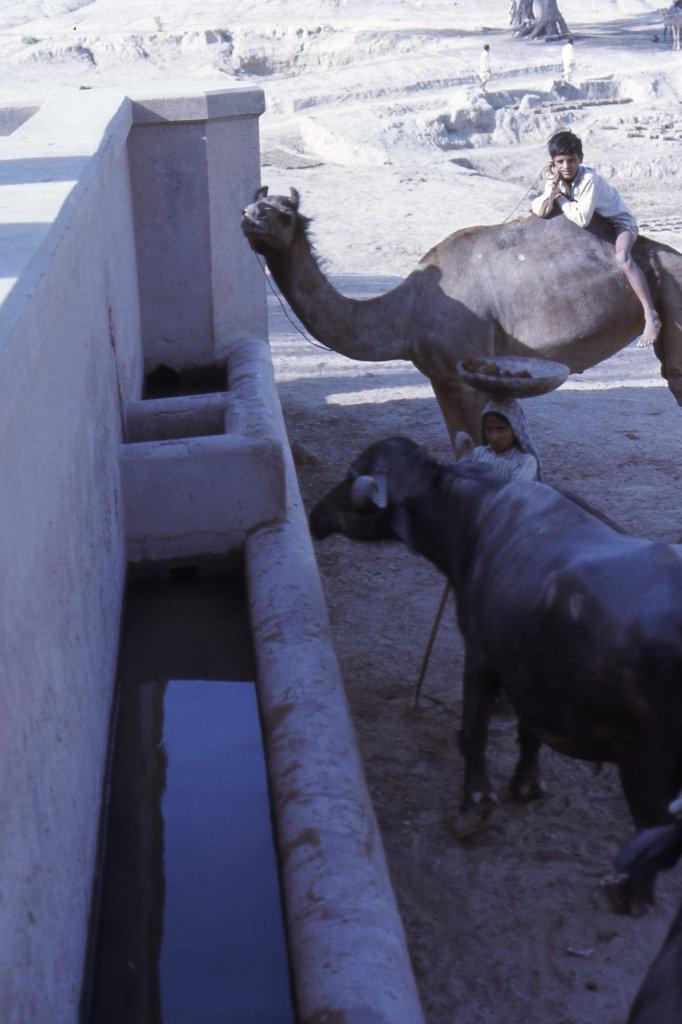
Animal Trough - 1977

== Language ==
People speak Bagri a dialect of Rajasthani language of Indo-Aryan family, spoken by about five million speakers in Hanumangarh and Sriganganagar districts of Rajasthan, Sirsa and Hissar districts of Haryana, Firozpur and Muktsar districts of Punjab of India and Bahawalpur and Bahawalnagar areas of Punjab of Pakistan. Bagri is a typical Indo-Aryan language having SOV word order.
