= Sahuwala =

Village in Rajasthan

- Village
- 9 AMS
- Location in Hanumangarh Rajasthan, India Sahuwala (India)
- Coordinates: 29.22°N 75.26°E
- country: India
- State (polity): Rajasthan
- District: Hanumangarh
- Division: 9 AMS, 13 AMS, 1 BBM, 2 BBM

Area
  - Total: 0.4 km^{2} (0.15 sq mi)

Dimensions
  - Length: 0.750 km (0.466 mi)
  - Width: 0.550 km (0.342 mi)
- Elevation: 207 m (679 ft)

Population
  - Total: 4,303(2011)

Language
  - Official: Hindi
- Time zone: [[UTC+5:30 ]] (IST)
- PINs: 335 511

Sahuwala is a village located in Bhadra Tehsil, within the Hanumangarh district in the state of Rajasthan, India. It is located near Haryana in the northern part of Rajasthan. It belongs to the Bikaner Division. Sahuwala has a few schools which are well rated and utilized by locals. The Sahuwala pincode is 335511.

== Geography ==
The village has two division, largest and minor division has 7 and 2 wards, respectively known as Sahuwala and Bambalwas. Diameter of Sahuwala is 750 meter of length and 550 of width, covers about 400,000 square meter area.

== Culture ==
Majority of population practices Hinduism, few hundreds people adheres Islam. Holi and Deepawali are celebrated by both religions. People used to wear traditional Rajasthani dresses such as Dhoti and Kurta.

== Economy ==
Agriculture contribute highest in economy. There are mainly two crop seasons Kharif and Rabi; source of irrigation is wells, rainfall and canal water. Wheat and barley are cultivated in large areas, as are pulses, sugarcane, and oilseeds. Cotton and tobacco are cash crops.
