= Jhansal =

- village
- Country: India
- State: Rajasthan

Population (2001)
  - Total: 5,389

Languages Haryanvi / bagdi
- Time zone: UTC+5:30 (IST)
- Postal code: 335511
- Telephone code: 01504
- ISO 3166 code: RJ-IN
- Nearest city: Adampur Hisar

Jhansal is an ancient village in Bhadra tehsil of Hanumangarh district in Rajasthan, India. It is located in the northeastern corner of the district, adjoining the Haryana border. It is about 27 km north-east of Bhadra (Hanumangarh) on Bhadra-Hisar road. As of the 2001 census its population was 5389, with 1419 in scheduled castes.

Savita Punia, Indian field hockey player, was born in this village.

This village is largely inhabited by poonia or punia Jats.
