= Ararki =

Village in Hanumangarh district, Rajasthan State, India

Coordinates: 29°06′N 74°44′E

- Village
- Interactive map of Ararki
- Location in Rajasthan, India Ararki (India)
- Country: India
- State: Rajasthan
- District: Hanumangarh

Languages
- Time zone: UTC+5:30 (IST)

Ararki is a village in Hanumangarh district of Rajasthan State, India. Ararki is 9 km away from Nohar Tahsil.
