= Bhirani =

- Town
- Location in Rajasthan, India Bhirani (India)
- Coordinates: 29.076851°N 75.368621°E
- Country: India
- State: Rajasthan
- District: Hanumangarh
- Founder: Moman Beniwal

Government
  - Type: Democratic
  - Body: Gram Panchayat
  - Sarpanch: Sh.Ramniwash verma

Area
  - Total: 2.5 km^{2} (0.97 sq mi)

Population (2021)
  - Total: 13,000
  - Density: 5,200/km^{2} (13,000/sq mi)

Languages
  - Official: Hindi
- Time zone: UTC+5:30 (IST)
- PIN: 335503
- Telephone code: 01504
- ISO 3166 code: +91
- Vehicle registration: RJ49

Bhirani is a Sub Tehsil of Hanumangarh district in the Indian state of Rajasthan. Bhirani is situated at a distance of about 22.1 km from its block headquarters Bhadra, 160.5 km from the district headquarters of Hanumangarh and 353.5 km away from the state capital of Jaipur. It is 200 km from national capital New Delhi. Hisar is the nearest Haryana district only 30 km

== Hospitial ==
Government Veterinary Hospital, Bhirani

Civil Hospital, bhirani

== Educational institutions ==
Schools

- Government senior secondary School
- Government Sanskrit School
- M.R.M Public Seniors Secondary school
- Shanti Niketan Secondary school
- Kids Heaven English Medium School
- Holy Angel English Medium School
- Govt Girls school
- URM public school

Nearby colleges include :

- Arya B.Ed. College
- S.G.L.D College for Higher education
- CSC computer technical institute

== Demographics ==
Rajasthani is the local language. Haryanvi tone mixup with Rajasthani (madhur language). This type of language generally used in Bhirani.
