= Pichkarain =

Pichkarain is a village of Nohar, Hanumangarh district, Rajasthan, India and is located 12 km from Nohar.
