= Tibbi =

- Town
- Location in Rajasthan, India Tibbi (India)
- Coordinates: 29.56°N 74.52°E
- Country: India
- State: Rajasthan
- District: Hanumangarh

Government
  - Body: Municipality Tibbi

Population (2011)
  - Total: 11,553

Languages
  - Official: Hindi, Bagri, Rajasthani
- Time zone: UTC+5:30 (IST)
- PIN: 335526
- Telephone code: 01539
- ISO 3166 code: RJ-IN
- Vehicle registration: 17 KM.
- Nearest city: Hanumangarh
- Sex ratio: 918:1000 ♀:♂
- Literacy: 54.8%
- Lok Sabha constituency: Sri Ganganagar
- Vidhan Sabha constituency: Sangaria
- Civic agency: Tibbi

Tibbi is a town and one of the seven tehsil headquarters of Hanumangarh district of Rajasthan state in India. It is nearby Hanumangarh city. It is at the junction of Haryana, Punjab, and Rajasthan states. The total population of Tibbi as of 2011 is 11,553 .

== Geography ==
It is also called the "Rice Belt of Rajasthan". Indira Gandhi Canal enters Rajasthan, from Punjab, at Masitawali and Talwara Jheel head village of Tibbi. Tibbi is situated on the bank of Ghaggar River which is the present form of the last mythological river Saraswati. Ghaggar River, which is also called as ‘Nali’ in local dialect. The Ghaghar river (paleochannel of sacred Sarasvati River), which originates at Adi Badri, Haryana in Sivalik Hills in Haryana, also enter in Tibbi from Haryana, and it flows to Pakistan via Anupgarh and Ganganagar.

== Demography ==
As per 2011 census, Tibi tehsil had a population of 165,217, of which 86,128 were males and 79,089 were females across 31,401 families with an average sex ratio of 918 female per 1000 male. The whole population live in Rural areas. The average literacy rate is 54.8% overall, 63.4% male and 45.4% female.

== History ==
Thakur Parasaram Singh Gahlot (sisodiya) came from Kuchera to Tibbi village in 1769 during the rule of Maharaja Gaj Singh of the princely state of Bikaner.At that time, Nagaur King Bakht Singh and Bikaner Maharaja Gaj Singh were jointly fighting with Jodhpur Maharaja Ram Singh in Nagaur.After defeating the Medtiyas, Gaj Singh gave villages as a reward to the assistant Thakurs. Thakur Parsaram Singh got the Bhomiyat of Tibi pargana by Gaj Singh in 1769 and they shared tibbi's bhomiyat with DHAKA'S who were already residing here. Thakur Parasram Singh ended the Terror and Robbery of Mushlim Akranta Sher Khan here. The village of Sherekan near Tibbi is named after the same robber. The "Gaddi" here was constructed by Bikaner Maharaj Surat Singh in 1801, which is currently the Tibbi police station.

Talwara lake in tibbi tehsil is also known for Taraian war (1191-1192) between Prithviraj Chauhan and Mohammad Gauri . In his invasion of India in 1398-99 CE, Timur encamped at the banks of this lake after overpowering Bhatner fort in modern-day Hanumangarh.

The first elected Sarpanch of Tibbi village, under the Panchayati Raj System after Independence, was Thakur Kesari Singh Gahlot/Sisodiya. His son, Rajendra Singh Gahlot/Sisodiya, was also elected to the same post in the succeeding years.
