= Roranwali =

Coordinates: 30°34′N 77°16′E

Roranwali is a village in Hanumangarh district, Rajasthan state of western India. The town of Hanumangarh is the district headquarters. It is about 5 km (3.1 mi) north of Hanumangarh on Hanumangarh-Abohar road.

== Profile ==
The village is located in the extreme north of Rajasthan. The major occupation is farming; major crops include mustard, bajra, cotton, wheat, and vegetables.

Earlier it was in Sri Ganganagar district and became part of Hanumangarh when Hanumangarh became a separate district on 12 July 1994.

== Education ==
The village has one Government Senior Secondary School for Boys and Girls and two Government Primary and Middle Schools. There are also a number of private Schools for Middle, and Secondary Education.

== Language ==
Bagri, a dialect of Rajasthani language, is spoken by most villagers. Hindi, Punjabi, Urdu are also spoken.

== How to reach ==
Roranwali is located 7 km (4.3 mi) from Hanumangarh. RSRTC provides Public Transit. The nearest Interstate Bus Terminus is in Hanumangarh. The nearest local railway station is at Jorkiyan and the Interstate Railway Station is in Hanumangarh. Private autoriksha also provide transportation.
