= Sangaria railway station =

Railway station in Rajasthan, India

Sangaria

General information
- Location: Sangaria, Hanumangarh district, Rajasthan; India
- Coordinates: 29.7931°N 74.4665°E
- System: Indian Railways station
- Owner: Indian Railways
- Operator: North Western Railway
- Line: Hanumangarh–Bathinda line
- Platforms: 1
- Tracks: 1

Construction
- Structure type: Standard (on ground station)
- Parking: Yes

Other information
- Status: Functioning
- Station code: SGRA
- Zone(s): North Western Railway
- Division(s): Bikaner
Location
- Location within India Location within Rajasthan

Sangaria railway station is a railway station in Hanumangarh district, Rajasthan. Its code is SGRA. It serves Sangaria town. The station consists of a single platform. Passenger, Express, and Superfast trains halt here.

== Trains ==
The following trains halt at Sangaria railway station in both directions:

- Ahmedabad–Jammu Tawi Express
- Avadh Assam Express
- Kalka–Barmer Express
- Hazur Sahib Nanded–Shri Ganganagar Express
