= Khothanwali =

Khothanwali 31 MOD
- Village
- Location in Rajasthan, India Khothanwali (India)
- Coordinates: 29.63°N 73.92°E
- Country: India
- State: Rajasthan
- District: Hanumangarh

Government
  - Type: Rural India
  - Body: Gram Panchayat
- Elevation: 176 m (577 ft)

Population (2011)
  - Total: 2,522

Languages
  - Official: Hindi
- Time zone: UTC+5:30 (IST)
- PIN: 335802
- Telephone code: 911508
- Vehicle registration: RJ-31

Khothanwali is a village in Hanumangarh district of Rajasthan, India. It belongs to Bikaner division. It is 48 km west of Hanumangarh. Suratgarh is the nearest railway station. It is 3 km from National Highway NH-62 (15)and 440 km from state capital Jaipur.
