= 29 DWD =

- Village
- Location in Rajasthan 29 DWD (India)
- Coordinates: 29.197156°N 74.402387°E
- Country: India
- State: Rajasthan
- District: Hanumangarh
- Subdistrict: Rawatsar

Population (2011)
  - Total: 969
- Time zone: UTC+05:30 (IST)
- Pincode: 33552
- Telephone code: 01539
- ISO 3166 code: RJ-IN

29 DWD is a village in Rawatsar tehsil in Hanumangarh district in the Indian state of Rajasthan.

== Demographics ==
As of 2011 India census, 29 DWD had a population of 969 in 173 households. Males constitute 53.8% of the population and females 46.1%. 29 DWD has an average literacy rate of 34.7%, lower than the national average of 74%, male literacy is 38.27%, and female literacy is 61.71%. In 29 DWD, 12% of the population is under 6 years of age.
