= Rawatsar =

Rawatsar Baba Khetarpal ji ki Nagri
- City
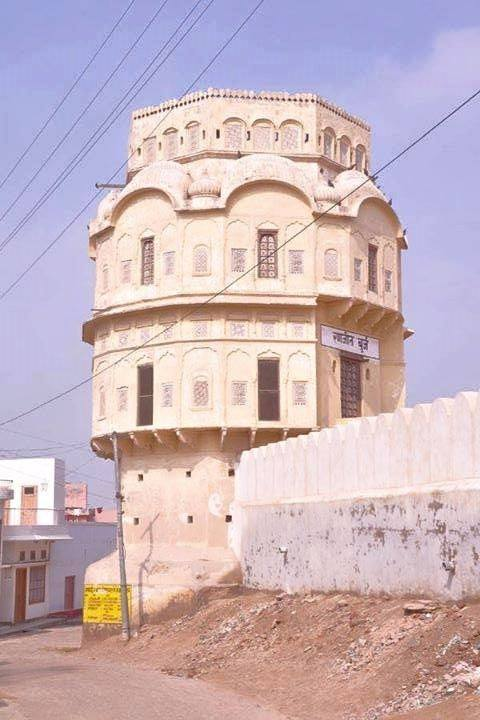
- Ranjeet Burj Rawatsar

- Location in Rajasthan, India Rawatsar (India)
- Coordinates: 29.28°N 74.38°E
- Country: India
- State: Rajasthan
- District: Hanumangarh
- Elevation: 176 m (577 ft)

Population (2011)
  - Total: 35,102

Languages
  - Official: Hindi
- Time zone: UTC+5:30 (IST)
- PIN: 335524
- Telephone code: +91-1537
- Sex ratio: 950 ♂/♀

Rawatsar is a city, a municipality, and one of the seven tehsils in Hanumangarh district in the Indian state of Rajasthan. It is divided into 35 wards for which elections are held every five years.

== History ==
=== Establishment by Raghodas ===
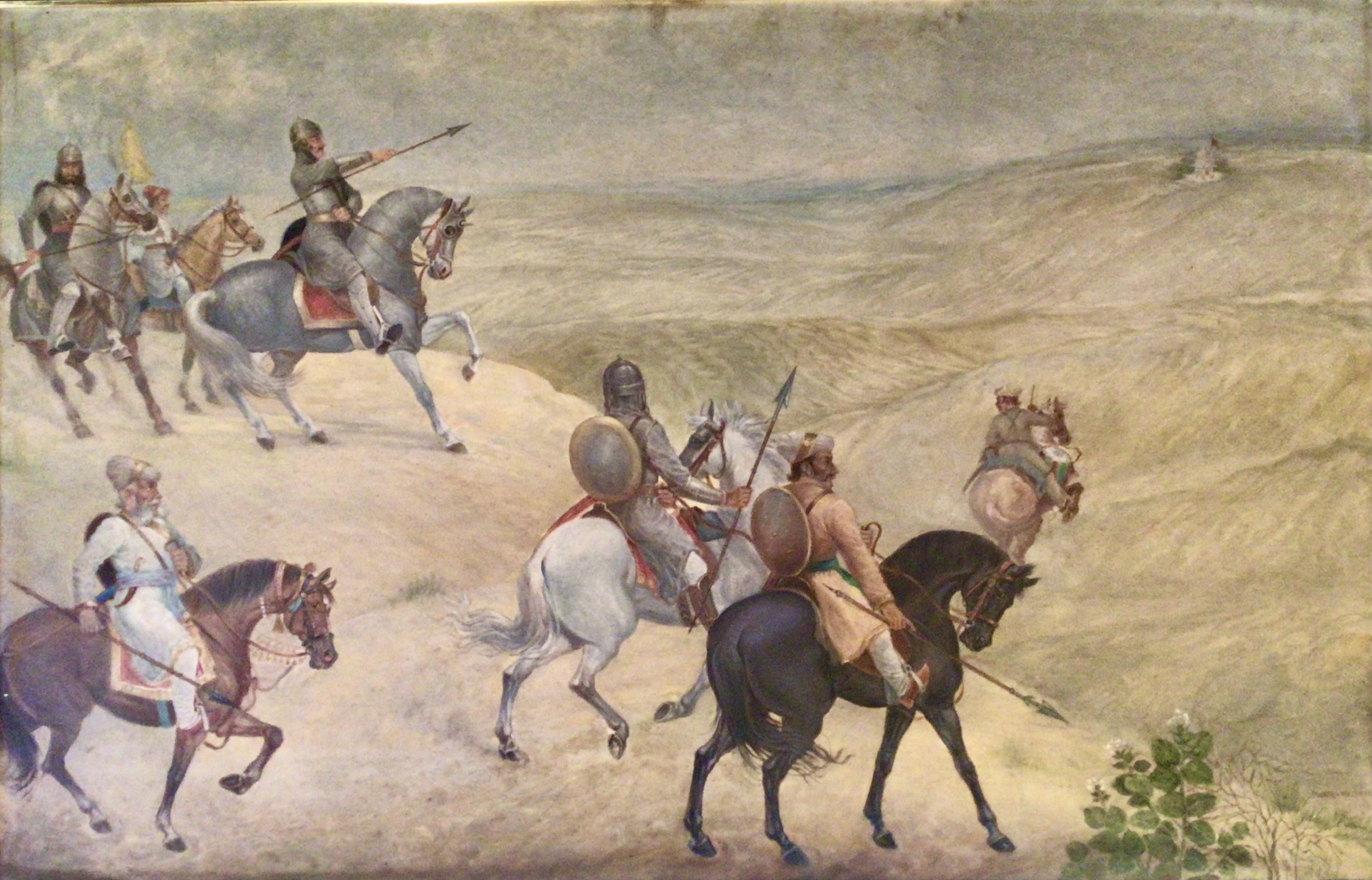
Rawat Raghodas with his followers at Sihagoti establishing Rawatsar.

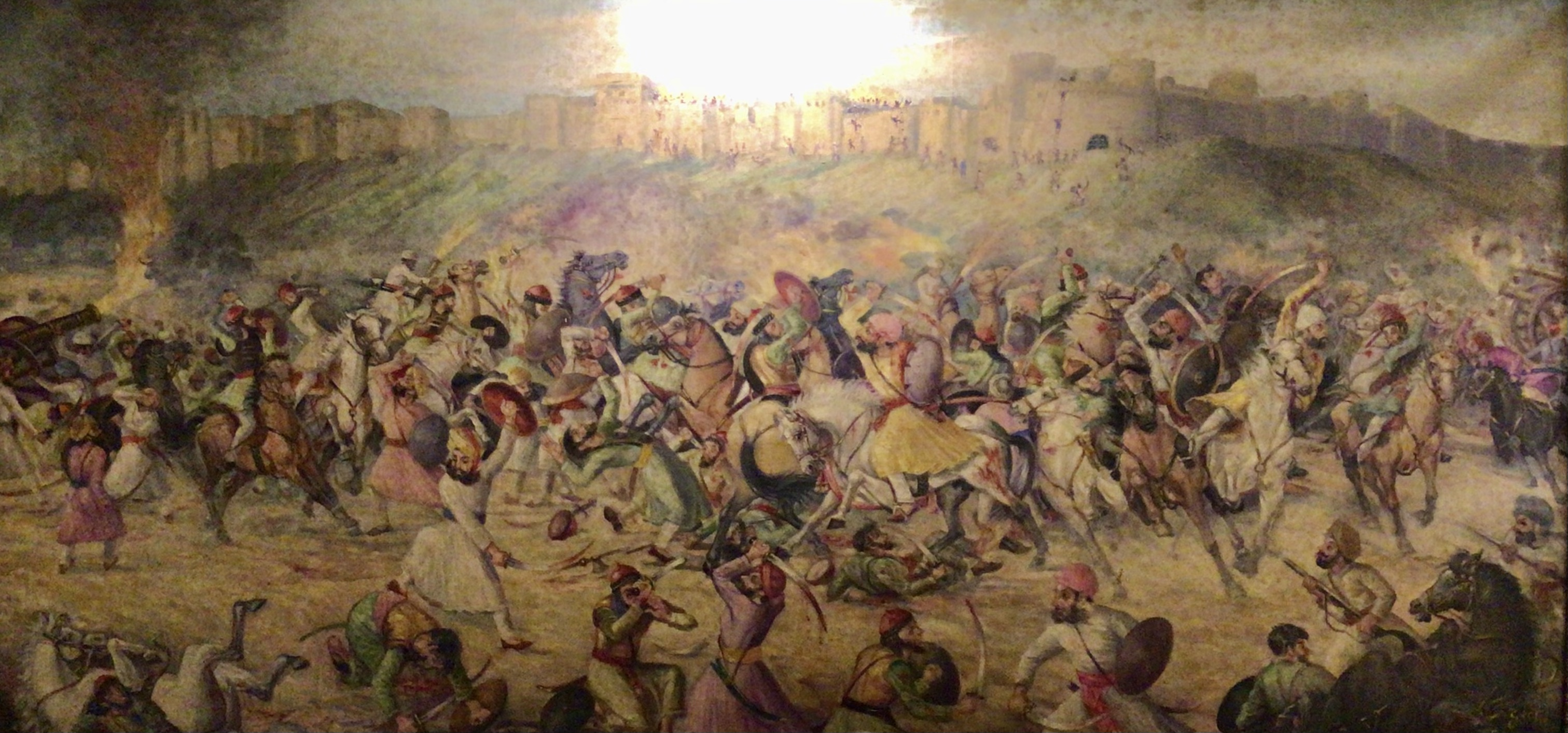
Battle of Hanumangarh, fought by Rawat Vijay Singh in 1804

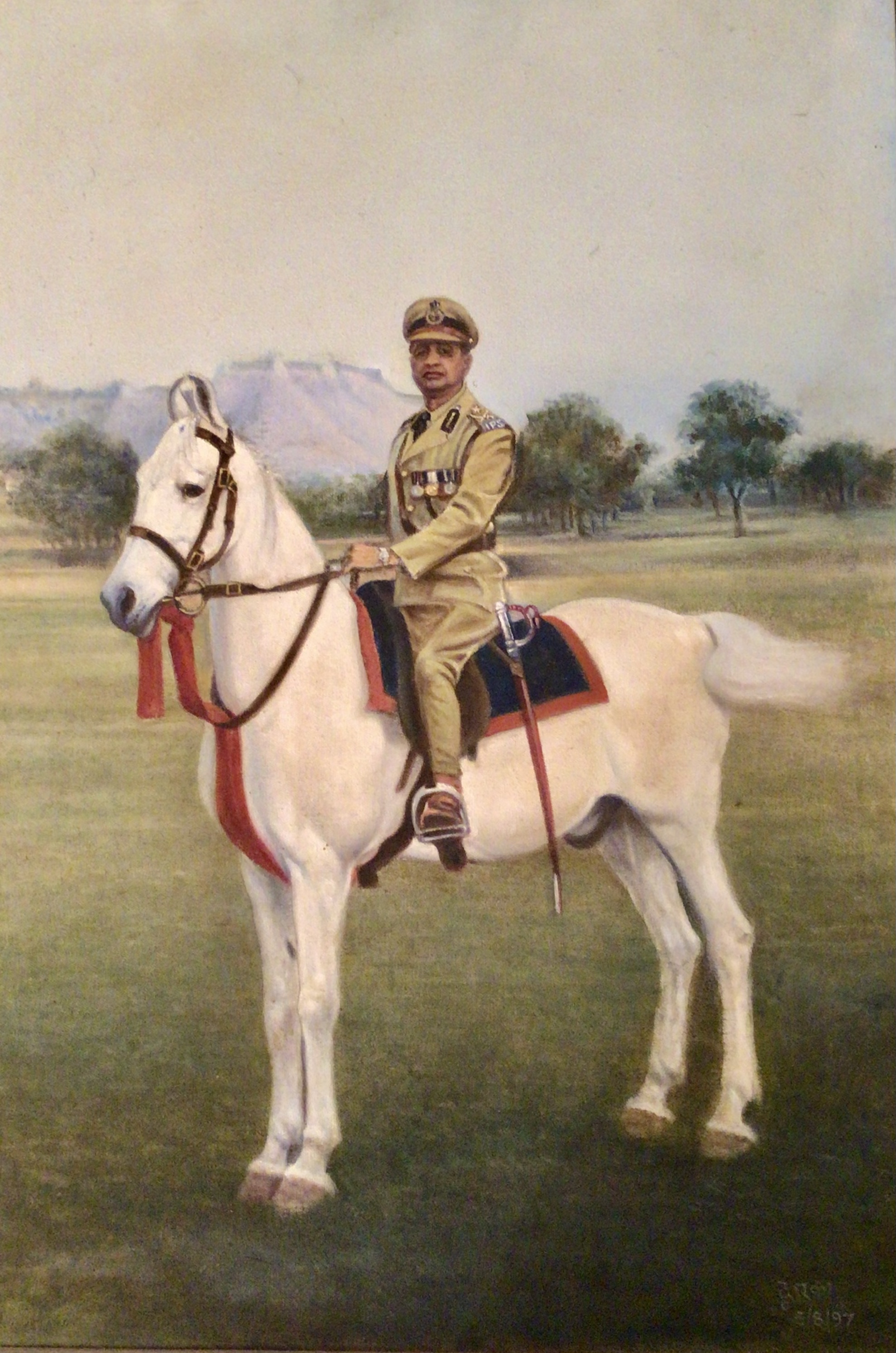
Painting of IPS Balbhadra Singh

Rawatsar was established in 1584 by Raghodas through conquest. Were also ruled by Guhilot. They had a common oppressor, the Nawab of Rania, who raided and pillaged the area. Raghodas defeated him, and he established the thikana of Rawatsar. He earned the title of Rawat, which carries prestige along with the headseat of the Kandhalot clan (descendants of Rawat Kandhal) for contributions in battles in the Deccan, South India, Gujarat and Sultanpur. The headseat of the clan shifted to Rawatsar from Jaitpur. Raghodas also constructed the Khetarpal ji Temple.

Rawatsar later on became a sirayat from a thikana, which made it one of the four major thikanas of Bikaner.

=== Bahadur Singh of Rawatsar ===
The Bhatner fort is 24 miles from Rawatsar, and the Rawats were involved in its annexation. In 1799, the Maharaja Surat Singh of Bikaner sent a force of 2,000 under the leadership of Bahadur Singh (the fourth son of Rawat Anand Singh) to reclaim Bhatner, which had been occupied by Bhatti Muslims, Thakur Madan Singh of Bhukarka, and Rawat Padam Singh of Jaitpur. The Bhattis led by Ahmad Khan were defeated at Dabli and the Bikaner Forces erected a fortification known as Fatehgarh. The Bikaner forces lost against George Thomas of Hissar, who took Fatehgarh in 1799 with the Bhatti. Bahadur Singh temporarily recaptured it in a blitz attack, but Fatehgarh was seized again and Bahadur Singh was killed.

== Geography ==
Rawatsar is located at 29.28°N 74.38°E. It has an elevation of 176 meters (577 feet).

== Demographics ==
As of the 2011 Indian census, Rawatsar had a population of 35,102. Males constituted 18,308 (52%) of the population and females 16,794 (48%). Rawatsar had an average literacy rate of 69.16%, higher than the state average of 66.11%: male literacy is around 78.91%, and female literacy is 58.66%.

== Language ==
Bagri, a dialect of the Rajasthani language, is spoken by a majority of the population.

== Khetapal Ji temple and fair ==
When Raghodas went to Burhapur, the army's supplies of food and water had depleted due to a drought. Due to the pressure he faced, he thought it was better to kill himself rather than to fail his followers. While he was trying to kill himself, it is said that Bhairava appeared in front of him and guided him to go to a certain place where he would find rations for the entire army and an idol. He did so and this idol was placed in the Khetarpal ji Temple. Every year, a large fair is held here. It is known as Ramdevji and KhetarPalji Mela. In the temple, devotees make a darshan of Baba Ramdev Ji and Baba Khetarpal Ji. In Rawtsar tehsil, Kinkriya is another fair that is held every year several times for Kesranath ji, who is considered a deity for treatment of snake bites.

== Economy ==
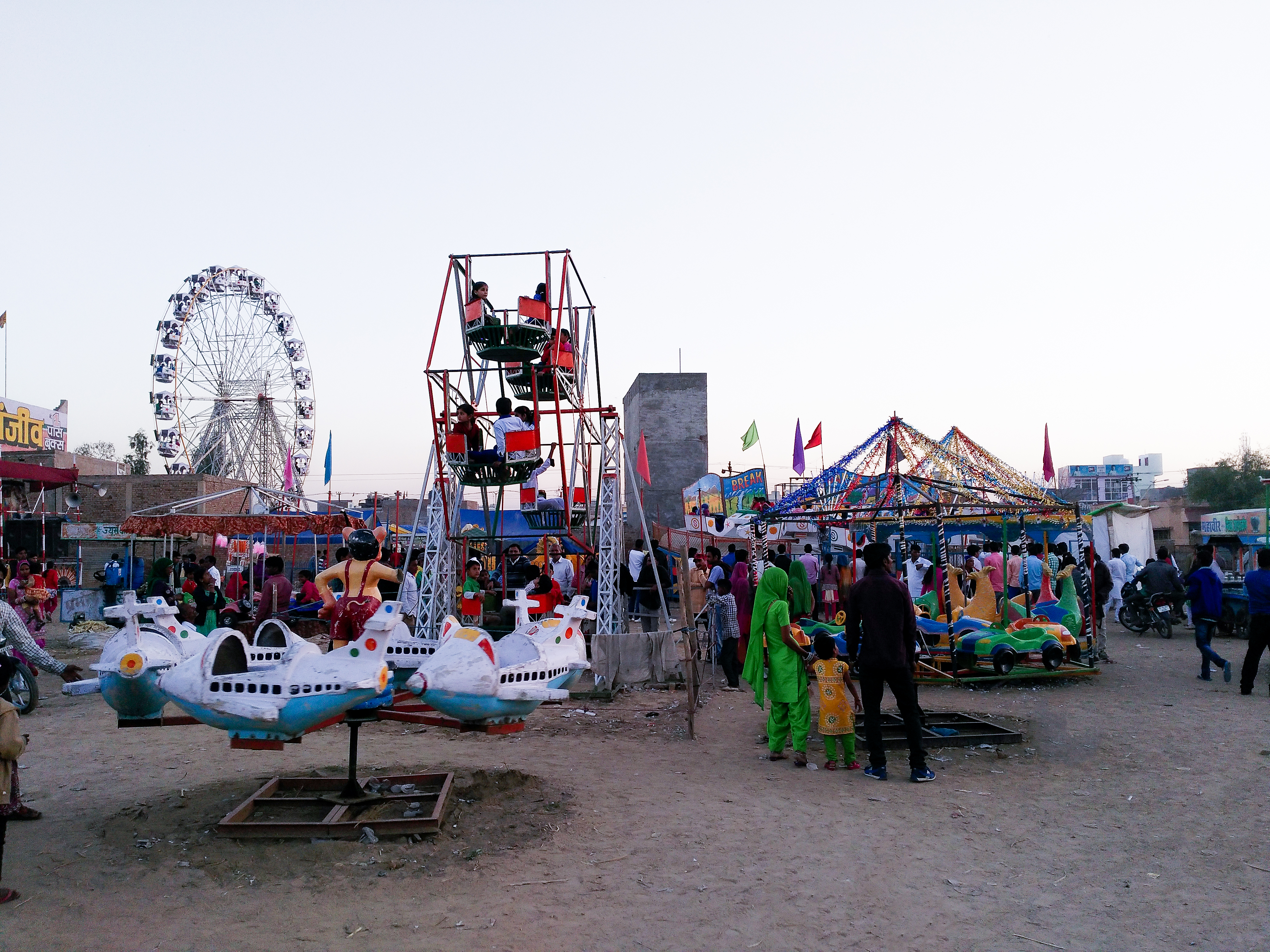
Rawatsar Ramdev Ji Khetarpal Ji Mela

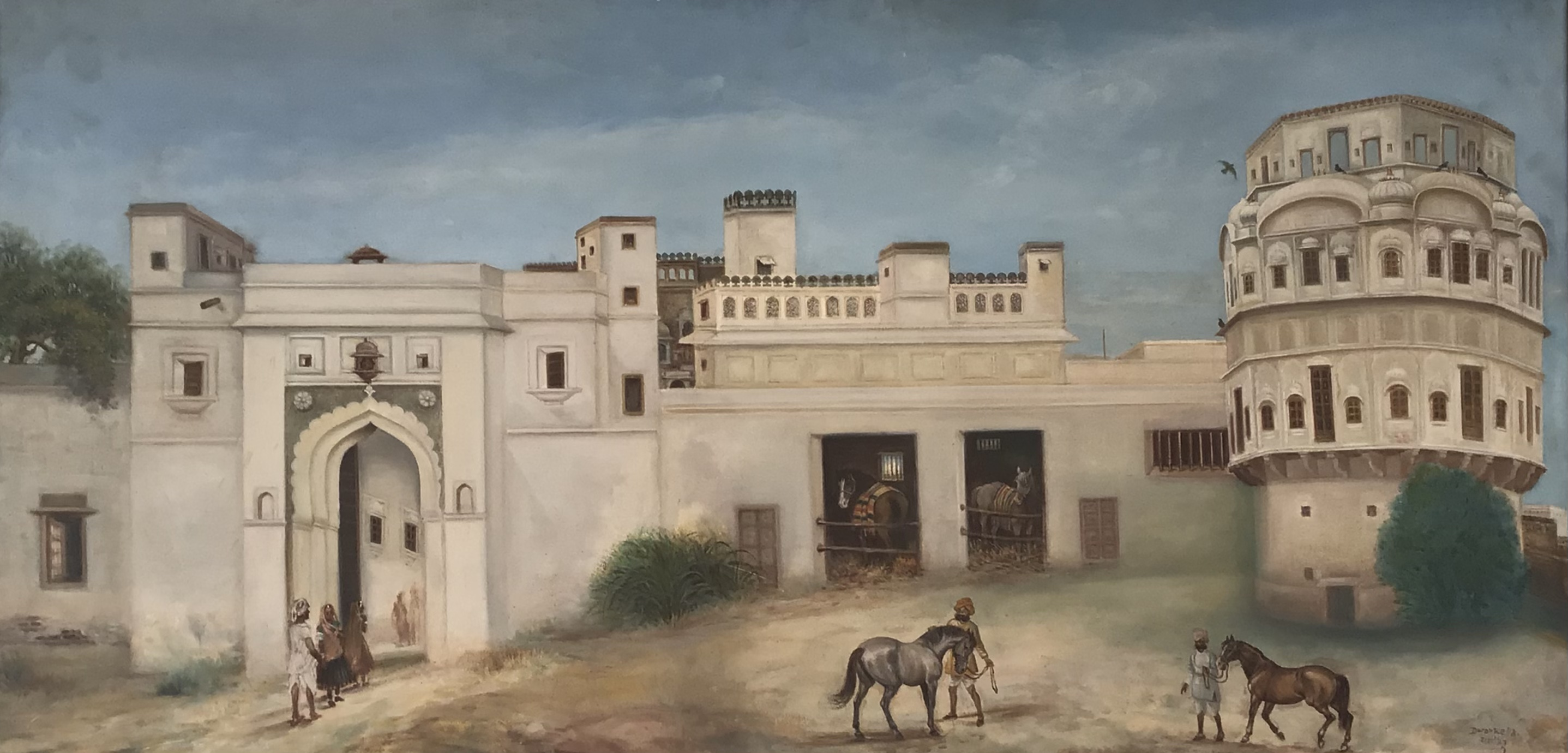
Painting of the Rawatsar Fort with Ranjeet Burj on the right.

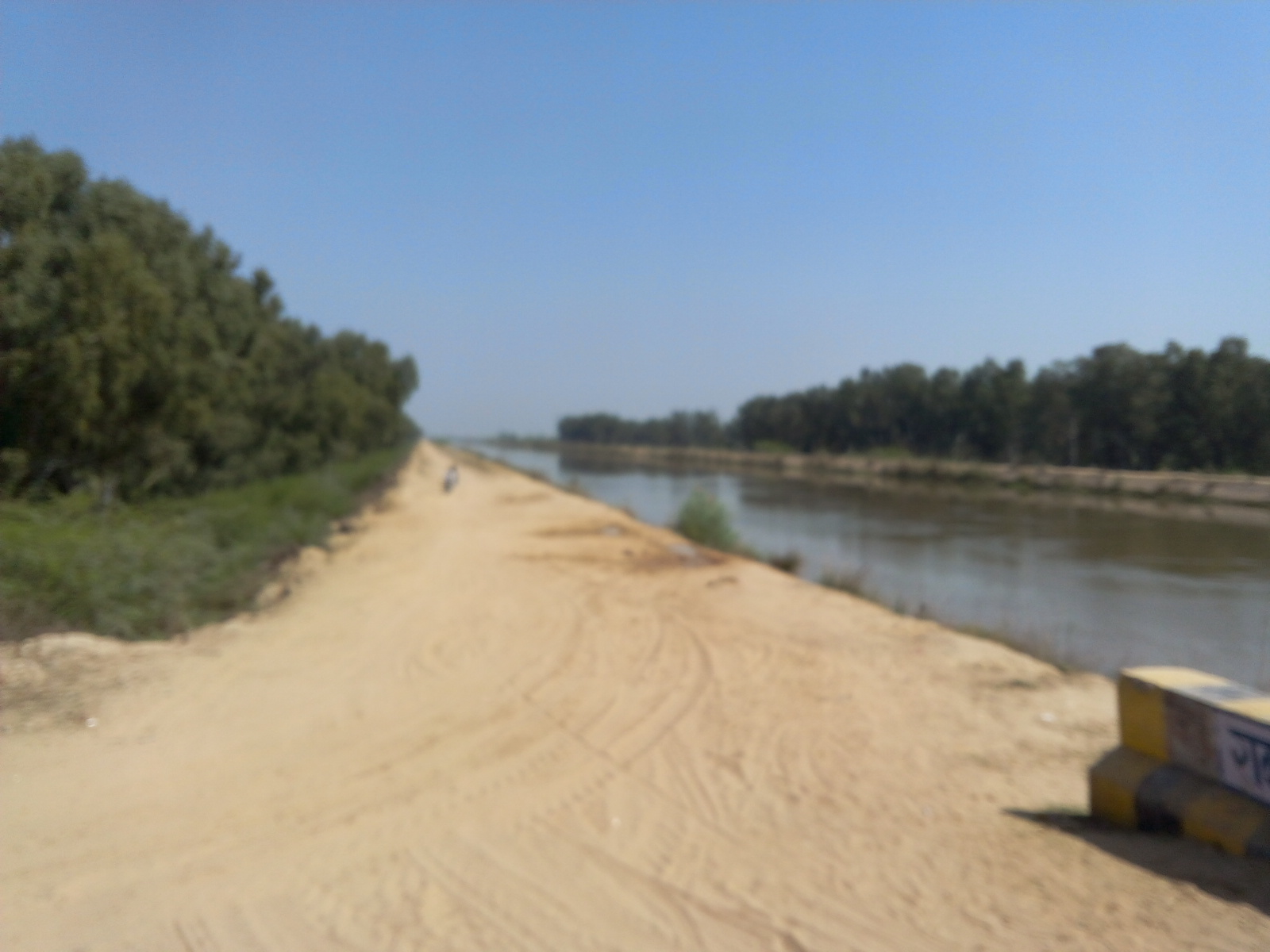
Indira Gandhi Canal near Rawatsar

The primary source of income for Rawatsar is agriculture, dairy farming and growing local market. The local grain market (mandi) serves as a trading hub for nearby villages. Wheat, Cotton, Mustard and Guar are the major crops whose trade fuels the economy of city. Farmers easily know about crop prices of rawatsar mandi on live auction held daily at APMC yard.

15 Cotton Mills are currently working under Rawatsar APMC including Shree Shyam Cotton, Ramachander Cotton Ginning & Pressing Factory, Kanaram Surjaram Cotton Ginning & Pressing Factory, Matoriya Cotton Factory, Sidhi Vinayak Agro Industry, Shree Jagdamba Cotton, Thakar Industries, Choudhary Cotton Ginning & Pressing Factory.
