= Deeplana =

Village in India

Deeplana is known as village of doctors. It is situated in Nohar tehsil in the Hanumangarh district in the Indian state of Rajasthan. "However, despite being highly educated and known as a village of doctors, the residents are forced to drink salty, fluoride-rich water because canal water never reaches the local waterworks. This exposes the true face of the Bhadra constituency MLA, who only shows up to seek votes during elections and disappears afterward. Deeplana village continues to remain underdeveloped."
