= Lalana =

Lalana is a village in Nohar, Hanumangarh, Rajasthan, India. Lalana is a large village so it is divided into five sub-villages or bas. These five bas are Uttrada, Dhikhanada, Shyopura, Nathwaniya, and Jaitasari.

As of 2011 the population of Lalana is approximately 10,000. Around 3,300 people live in Dikhnada, 700 in Jetasari, 1,700 in Nathwaniya, 1,400 in Sheopura, and 2,900 in Utrada.
