= Barwali =

Coordinates: 27°7′31.49″N 74°46′15.64″E

- Village
- Interactive map of Barwali
- Country: India
- State: Rajasthan
- Division: ajmer
- Elevation: 197 m (646 ft)
- Time zone: IST
- Pincode: 335504

Barwali is a village in Hanumangarh district of the Indian state of Rajasthan.

== Area ==
Ramgarh 6 km, Parlika 6 km, Rajpuria 5 km, Jamal 10 km, Nethrana 5 km are the nearest villages to Barwali (11 Ntr (b) ). Barwali (11 Ntr (b) ) is bordered by Nohar Tehsil to its west, Bhadra Tehsil to its east, and Sirsa Tehsil to its north.
