= Pilibanga railway station =

Railway station in Rajasthan, India

Pilibanga

General information
- Location: Pilibanga, Hanumangarh district, Rajasthan; India
- Coordinates: 29.483830°N 74.078805°E
- Elevation: 177 metres (581 ft)
- System: Indian Railways station
- Owner: Indian Railways
- Operator: North Western Railway
- Line: Hanumangarh–Suratgarh line
- Platforms: 2
- Tracks: 2

Construction
- Structure type: Standard (on ground station)
- Parking: Yes

Other information
- Status: Single diesel line
- Station code: PGK
- Zone(s): North Western Railway
- Division(s): Bikaner
Location
- Location within India Location within Rajasthan

Pilibanga railway station is a railway station in Hanumangarh district, Rajasthan. Its code is PGK. It serves Pilibanga town. The station consists of 2 platforms. Passenger, Express, and Superfast trains halt here.

== Trains ==
The following trains halt at Pilibanga railway station in both directions:

- Ahmedabad–Jammu Tawi Express
- Avadh Assam Express
- Kota–Shri Ganganagar Superfast Express
- Kalka–Barmer Express
- Bhavnagar Terminus–Udhampur Janmabhoomi Express
