= Tahsil Bhadra railway station =

Railway station in Rajasthan, India

Tahsil Bhadra

General information
- Location: Tahsil Bhadra, Hanumangarh district, Rajasthan; India
- Coordinates: 29.101623°N 75.161360°E
- System: Indian Railways station
- Owner: Indian Railways
- Operator: North Western Railway
- Line: Hanumangarh–Sadulpur line
- Platforms: 3
- Tracks: 3

Construction
- Structure type: Standard (on ground station)
- Parking: Yes

Other information
- Status: Functioning
- Station code: TSD
- Zone(s): North Western Railway
- Division(s): Bikaner
Location
- Location within India Location within Rajasthan

Tahsil Bhadra railway station is a railway station in Hanumangarh district, Rajasthan. Its code is TSD. It serves Tahsil Bhadra city. The station consists of 3 platforms. Passenger, Express, and Superfast trains halt here.

== Trains ==
The following trains halt at Tahsil Bhadra railway station in both directions:

- Bikaner–Bilaspur Antyodaya Express
