= Bhukarka =

Village in Nohar Tehsil, Hanumangarh district, Rajasthan, India

Coordinates: 29.237°N 74.744°E

Bhukarka is a village in Nohar Tehsil in Hanumangarh district of Rajasthan, India. It belongs to Bikaner division.
