= Karanpura =

- Interactive map of Karanpura
- 29.046840°N 75.090044°E
- Type: Archaeological site
- Periods: Early Harappan (3300-2600 BCE) to Mature Harappan (2600-1900 BCE) periods
- Location: Near Bhadra city, Hanumangarh district, Rajasthan, India
- Region: Thar Desert

Site notes
- Condition: Excavated
- Owner: ASI

Karanpura is an archeological site near Bhadra city of Hanumangarh district in Rajasthan, India. It belongs with ancient Indus Valley civilization. Harappan pottery has been found after excavation.

== Location ==
Karanpura is located on Nohar-Bhadra road near Bhadra city of Hanumangarh district of Rajasthan, India. Administrationally Karanpura is in Bhadra tehsil of Hanumangarh district of Rajasthan. It is 8 km in the west from Bhadra and 125 km in the south-east from district headquarters Hanumangarh. Other famous Harappan site of this district Kalibangan is about 120 km in the west from Karanpura.

== Excavation ==
The excavation was done by a team under archeologist V N Prbhakar, archeological department of India, New Delhi.

The archeologists have found pottery and articles of Harappan period. Excavations discovered many mud brick houses from early Harappan (3300-2600 BCE) to mature Harappan (2600-1900 BCE) periods.

Within the site, Harappan pottery, terracotta bangles, grinding stone fragments, beads of agate, and a terracotta figurine have been excavated. Using the artifacts discovered at the site, trade routes have been linked that reach as far as Afghanistan during the Harappan civilization. Despite being small in size compared to other Harappan sites, the ancient city was a major long-distance trading hub.

Within the site, a rare discovery of 4 complete rhino bones was found, suggesting that the surrounding area was inhabitable with rhino.

A copper mirror was also found at the site, a rarity in Harappan culture, but more evidence of their extensive trading.

Pottery preceding Harappan culture has also been found within the site. Continuous findings within the site for up to 3 meters suggest a continuous occupation roughly since 2800 BCE.

Early Harappan findings of copper and lapis lazuli indicate long-standing acquisition and trade of raw materials up to the mature Harappan period. Steatite seals and an abundance of graffiti was also discovered within the mature Harappan portion of the site.

Terracota like pottery and bangles which are similar with findings at other Harappan sites were found. In January 2013 a skeleton of child has been found. Seals similar to other Harppan sites also has been found in 2013–2014.

== See also ==
- Balu, Haryana Indus Valley Civilization site
- Banawali Indus Valley Civilization site
- Baror Indus Valley Civilization site
- Bhirrana Indus Valley Civilization site
- Ganeriwala Indus Valley Civilization site
- Kalibangan Indus Valley Civilization site
- Kunal, Haryana Indus Valley Civilization site
- Mitathal Indus Valley Civilization site
- Rakhigarhi Indus Valley Civilization site
- Sothi Indus Valley Civilization site
