= Goluwala =

- Town
- Location in Rajasthan, India
- Coordinates: 29.63°N 74.06°E
- Country: India
- State: Rajasthan
- District: Hanumangarh
- Established: 1910

Government
  - Type: Gram Panchayat (Old), Municipality (2025)

Area
  - Total: 4 km^{2} (1.5 sq mi)
- Elevation: 177 m (581 ft)

Population (2011)
  - Total: 16,000 estm (9,753{24JRK}+5,207{22JRK}+1,032{23JRK-B)
  - Density: 4,000/km^{2} (10,000/sq mi)

Languages
  - Official: Hindi, Bagri (Rajasthani Language)
- Time zone: UTC+5:30 (IST)
- PIN: 335802
- 01508: 911508
- Vehicle registration: RJ-31
- Website: https://www.mhers.in

Goluwala is a city in Hanumangarh district of Rajasthan, India. It belongs to Bikaner division. It is divided into two suburbs– Niwadan and Sihagan. It is an industrial town located some 31 km west of Hanumangarh. The total population was about 16000 in the 2011 census.

== Demographics ==
At the 2011 India census, Goluwala ( 24 Jrk, 22 Jrk & 23 Jrk-B) has a population of around 20000+ in 2024. The first election of Goluwala as municipality is hold in 2026. The majority of the population is Hindu, Jain, and Sikh. males constituted around 51% of the population and females around 49%. Goluwala had an average literacy rate of around 78.32%, higher than the national average of 73.0%: male literacy is around 85.42%, and female literacy is around 70.42%. The main caste resides here are Hindu, Sikh, and Jain.

== Languages ==
Bagri (Rajasthani) is the major language in Hanumangarh. Punjabi is also used.

== Climate ==
The average maximum temperature in the summer is around 41.2 °C (106.2 °F) and the average minimum temperature in winter is around 6 °C (43 °F). The average annual rainfall is 200 millimetres (7.9 in).
