= Mirjawali Mair =

- village
- Country: India
- State: Rajasthan
- District: Hanumangarh

Languages
  - Official: Hindi
- Time zone: UTC+5:30 (IST)
- ISO 3166 code: RJ-IN
- Vehicle registration: RJ-
- Coastline: 0 kilometres (0 mi)

Mirjawali Mair is a village in Hanumangarh district of Rajasthan, India.
