= Dhadhela =

- village
- Country: India
- State: Rajasthan

Languages
  - Official: Hindi
- Time zone: UTC+5:30 (IST)
- ISO 3166 code: RJ-IN
- Vehicle registration: RJ-

'Dhandhela' is a village in northern Rajasthan state in western India, located 60 km from Hanumangarh.Prior to independence, it was located in the kingdom of Bikaner and its nearest railway station is Nohar on Sri Ganganagar–Jaipur Railway Line.

The village is located in the extreme northern fringes of Thar Desert in Rajasthan.

The village has an agrarian economy.
