= Dholipal =

Coordinates: 29°45′N 74°16′E

Dholipal is a small village in the district of Hanumangarh district of Rajasthan, India. The village has a population of 102 people according to the 2011 Indian census.
