= Ajeetpura =

- Village
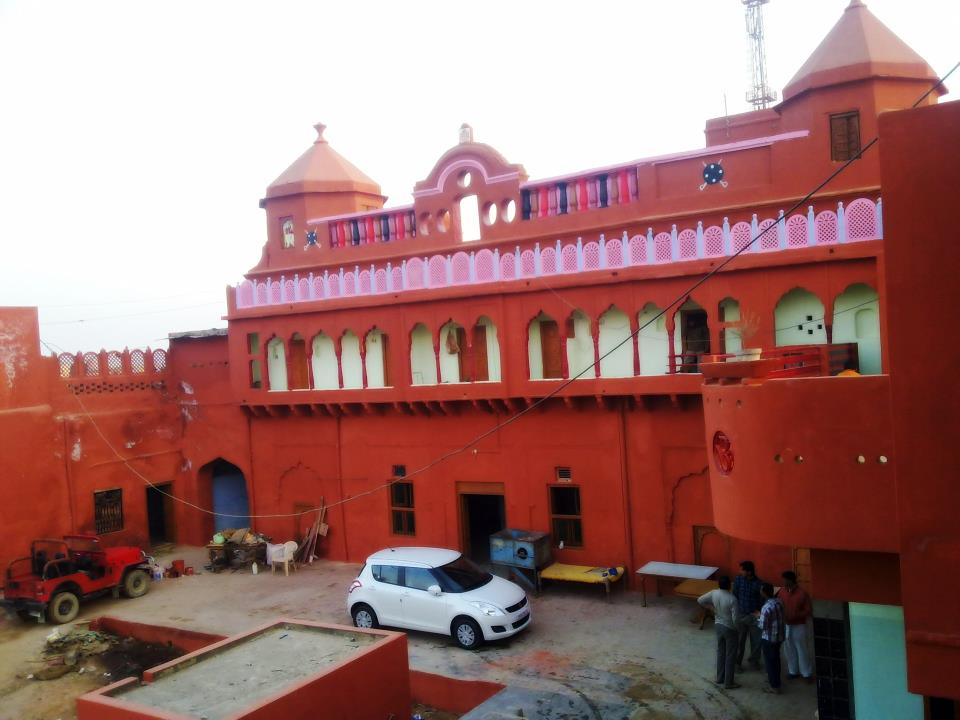
- Ajeetpura

- Location in Rajasthan, India Ajeetpura (India)
- Coordinates: 29.02°N 75.32°E
- Country: India
- State: Rajasthan
- District: Hanumangarh
- Tehsil: Bhadra

Area
  - Total: 16 km^{2} (6.2 sq mi)
- Elevation: 191 m (627 ft)

Population (2011)
  - Total: 7,529
  - Density: 470/km^{2} (1,200/sq mi)

Languages
  - Official: Hindi
- Time zone: UTC+5:30 (IST)
- PIN: 335501
- Telephone code: 01504
- Vehicle registration: RJ-31

Ajeetpura is a village in the Hanumangarh district, Rajasthan state in India. It falls under the Bhadra tehsil of the district. The PIN code of Ajeetpura is 335501.

== Demographics ==
As per the 2011 Census of India, Ajeetpura has a total population of 7,529, comprising 3,798 males and 3,731 females. The village has an average sex ratio of 982 females per 1,000 males, higher than the Rajasthan state average of 928.

== Geography ==
Ajeetpura is located in the north-western region of Rajasthan. The area has an arid to semi-arid climate with hot summers and cool winters.

== Administration ==
Ajeetpura is administered under Bhadra tehsil in Hanumangarh district. The village follows the local panchayati raj system for governance.

== Economy ==
The economy of Ajeetpura is primarily based on agriculture, with crops such as wheat, mustard and cotton being commonly cultivated in the region.

== Transport ==
Ajeetpura is connected to nearby towns by local road networks. The nearest town, Bhadra, provides access to broader transportation facilities in the region.

== See also ==
- Hanumangarh district
- Bhadra
- Rajasthan
