= Vinod Gothwal =

Indian politician

Member of Rajasthan Legislative Assembly
- Incumbent
- Assumed office 3 December 2023
- Preceded by: Dharmendra Kumar
- Constituency: Pilibanga

Personal details
- Political party: Indian National Congress

Vinod Gothwal is an Indian politician, and he is currently representing Pilibanga Assembly constituency as a Member of Rajasthan Legislative Assembly. He is a member of Indian National Congress.
