= Delhi–Multan road =

Route across the Indian subcontinent

The Delhi–Multan road was an ancient route which existed since the times of Ashoka or earlier, later renovated by Sher Shah Suri (1486–1545) in order to improve transit in the areas between Delhi and Multan. From Multan it led to Kandahar and Herat and eventually to Mashhad, the capital of Khorasan in modern-day Iran, providing access to Ashgabat, the capital of Turkmenistan.

Evolution of Indian trade networks, showing the routes since Mughal times, Inset A: the major pre-historical cultural currents, B: pre-Mauryan routes, C: Mauryan routes, D: routes c. 1st century CE, and E: the Z-shaped region of developed roads.

== Messaging system ==
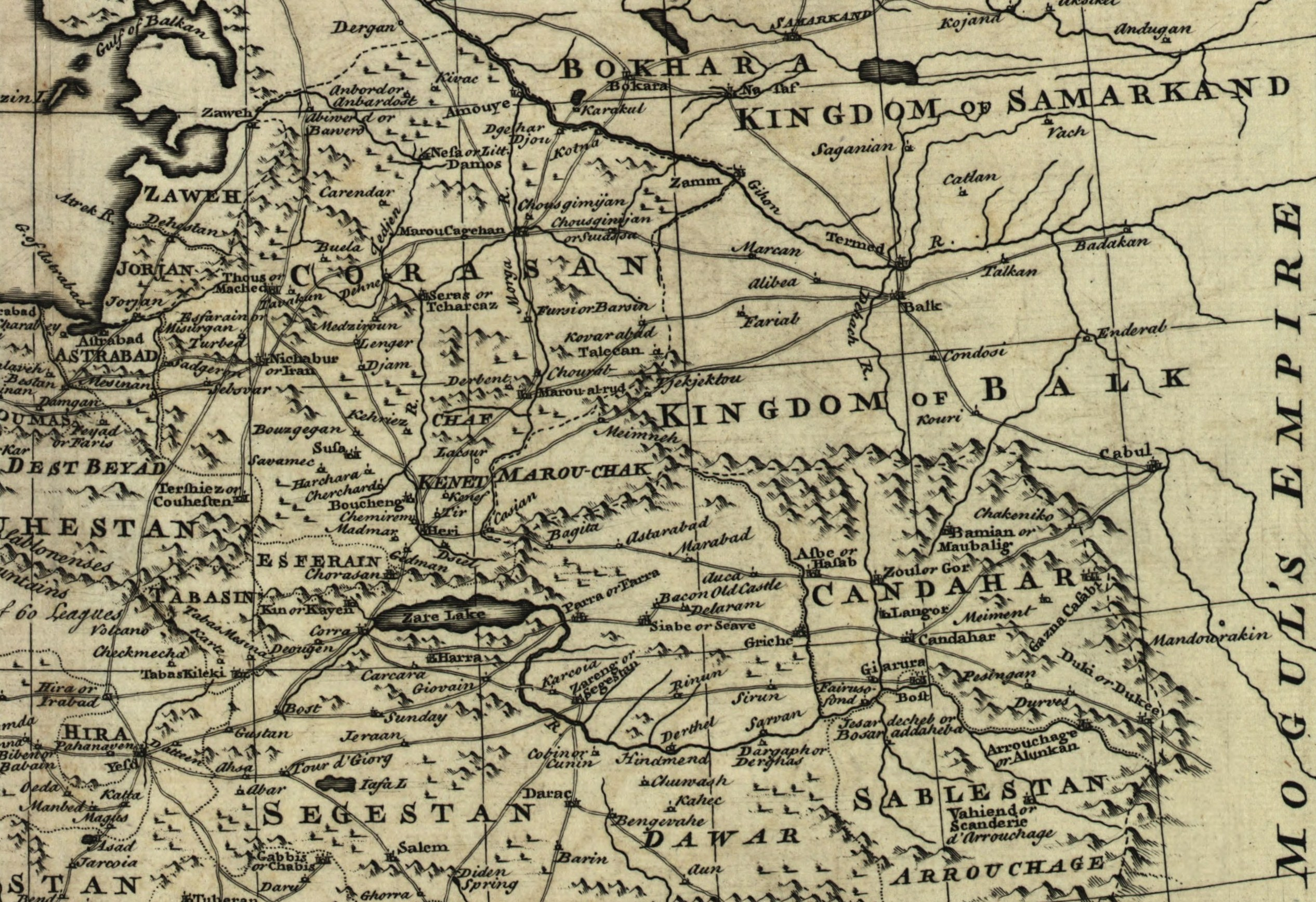
A map of Persia by Emanuel Bowen showing the names of territories during the Safavid Empire and Mughal Empire (ca. 1500–1747)

There were small posts every few miles where horses were ready to receive messages to send from one post to another. Messages from the Delhi court were reaching Multan, which was around 500 miles away, within days.

== Route ==
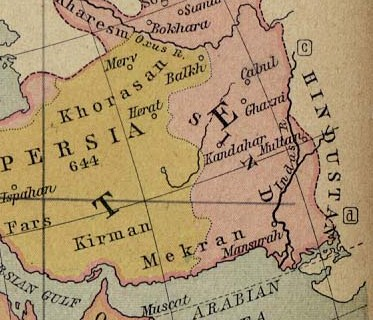
Eastern territories of the Caliphate in 750 CE.

In India, it passed through the cities of Rohtak, Panipat, Karnal, Kurukshetra, Ambala, Rajpura, Sirhind, Ludhiana, Firozpur, and Hussainiwala. Part from Delhi to Ludhiana falls under National Highway 44 of India. Distance traversed in India is 500 kilometres (310 mi).

In Pakistan, the road went through the cities of Kasur, Raiwind, Lahore, Nankana Sahib, Harapa, Chichawatni, Tulamba, Makhdumpur, Kabirwala and finally Multan. Sher Shah also built a fort in Tulamba to make a strong communication path from Multan to Delhi. Distance traversed in Pakistan is 589 kilometres (366 mi).

Then from Multan it led to Kandahar in Afghanistan, and then on to Herat, traversing another 599 kilometres (372 mi).

Again from Herat it led to Mashhad in Khorasan province of Iran, traversing another 576 kilometres (358 mi).

Finally from Mashhad, it led to modern-day capital of Turkmenistan, Ashgabat, traversing final 652 kilometres (405 mi).

From Delhi to Ashgabat, the road traversed for 2,916 kilometres (1,812 mi), and was an important roadway of Asia during medieval period.

== See also ==
- Grand Trunk Road
