= Dablirathan =

Coordinates: 29.5513582°N 74.191060°E

Dabli Rathan Ratha Ali
- Village
- Interactive map of Dabli Rathan
- Country: India
- State: Rajasthan
- District: Hanumangarh

Population
  - Total: 15,149
  - Rank: 1st (in Hanumangarh District)

Languages
  - Official: Hindi
- Time zone: UTC+5:30 (IST)
- Postal code: 335801
- ISO 3166 code: RJ-IN
- Vehicle registration: RJ-31
- Coastline: 0 kilometres (0 mi)
- Website: http://www.dablirathan.com

Dabli Rathan is the largest village of the Hanumangarh District, in the state of Rajasthan in India. It is surrounded by canals on three sides and the Gaghar river on the fourth side. It is divided into two suburbs, or panchayats, named Dabli bas Molvi (1 Dbl-A) and Dabli bas Kutub. In the 2011 census, its population was 15,149. Dabli Rathan is 13 km from district headquarters. It has a large market.
