= Bhadra, Rajasthan =

Bhadra Rajasthan
- Tehsil
- Nickname: The Aryan City
- Location in Hanumangarh Rajasthan, India Bhadra Rajasthan (India)
- Coordinates: 29.12°N 75.17°E
- Country: India
- State: Rajasthan
- District: Hanumangarh
- Elevation: 192 m (630 ft)

Population (2011)
  - Total: 40,662

Languages
  - Official: Bagri, Rajasthani, Hindi
- Time zone: UTC+5:30 (IST)
- PIN: 335501
- Area code: 01504
- ISO 3166 code: RJ-IN
- Vehicle registration: RJ49

Bhadra is a city and a municipality in Hanumangarh district in the state of Rajasthan, India.

Bhadra in Bagri means "The City of Grace". This name comes from the river Raslana Vithrika. Bhadra was founded by Bhadrak community on the Sangam of Varshvati and Swarnabhadra rivers which were a Janpad/Gantantra. Bhadra's history can be traced from the time of Mahabharata where it was mentioned that Bhadra is in Kurupradesh. Labanas after being defeated by Mohmed Gazni in the year 1027 came to Jangal Pradesh and rebuilt Bhadra. Traces of Saraswati River were also found in Bhadra. Some traces of Haddapa kalin sabhayata were also found in Karanpura village located near Bhadra.

In the medieval era it was ruled Beniwal Jats. It is also mentioned in Ain-i-akbari of 1595 AD.

As the Tehsil is also known as top Education Hub in Hanumangarh district.

The town is well connected through a railroad on the Sri Ganganagar-Sadulpur (Rajgarh)-Jaipur line, and through state highways to Hisar and Sirsa in the neighbouring state of Haryana. Bhadra is also famous for its Tiles market .

== Administration ==
Area-wise, Nethrana is the largest village of the Bhadra subdistrict. There are 215 villages under Bhadra Tehsil.

== Demographics ==
As of the 2011 Indian census, Bhadra has a population of 40,662. Males constitute 53% (21,215) of the population and females 47% (19,447). Bhadra has an average literacy rate of 75%, higher than the national average of 74%; with 81% of the males and 67% of females literate. 15% of the population is under 6 years of age.

=== Language ===
Bagri, a dialect of the Rajasthani language, is spoken by a majority of the population.

== Places of interest ==
Bhadra Market is famous for clothes and textiles imported from Haryana. The main market is located near Bapu Walo Ki Dharamsala at Murti Chowk.

Gogamedi (Hindi: गोगामेड़ी) is a village of religious importance in the Hanumangarh district of Rajasthan, India, 350 km from Jaipur. A grand fair is held in Gogamedi in August in memory of Gogaji (a Chauhan Rajput from Dadrewa village in Churu district) which runs for one month from the Poornima of Sharvan to the Poornima of Bhadrapad every year. Gogamedi is accessible on NH 65 from Chandigarh.

== Sports ==
The Govt. College Ground cricket stadium has a seating capacity of 3,185 and has hosted State and District Cricket or Football matches. Indoor Stadium and Railway Cricket Ground are the other sporting areas in the city.

== Transport ==
=== Road ===
Bhadra is located on National Highway No. 8, connecting Delhi and Jaipur. RJ Sh 37 links Jaipur with Kota and National Highway 8 links Bikaner. The HRTC and RSRTC operates bus service to major cities in Rajasthan, New Delhi, Uttar Pradesh, Haryana, Madhya Pradesh, Maharashtra, Punjab, and Gujarat. The service operates more than 400 regular and low-floor buses. Major bus depots are located at Main Bus Stand, Ambedkar chock (night buses only), and Sahwa Bus Stand.

=== Rail ===
Tahsil Bhadra railway station (North Western Railway zone, Bikaner division) is well connected to major cities and towns like Bathinda, Jaipur, Sikar, Sadulpur, Churu, Gogameri, Nohar, Hanumangarh, Sri Ganganagar and Ellenabad including Sidhmukh, Talwara and Tibbi. Other cities ininclud New Delhi, Mumbai and Ahmedabad.

== Education ==
DM Smart School and SNPS are some of the prestigious educational institutes working for uplifting of education in the area. There are many government and private schools for high school education providing education in all streams like arts, science and commerce affiliated to CBSE as well as BSER.

== Banks ==
There are several nationalized, scheduled, and rural banks in the city.

Nationalized banks include the Punjab National Bank, Bank of Baroda, Canara Bank, Oriental Bank of Commerce, State Bank of India, State Bank of Bikaner & Jaipur, and State Bank of Patiala.

Other scheduled banks include ICICI Bank, HDFC Bank, AXIS Bank, and Rajasthan Marudhara Bank.

== Media ==
Major daily newspapers in Bhadra include Rajasthan Patrika, Samachar Jagat, Dainik Bhaskar, Dainik Navajyoti, and The Times of India. The state-owned All India Radio is broadcast both on the medium wave and FM band in the city. FM stations Gyan Vani (105.6 MHz). The city has a community FM channel in FM Radio 7 (90.4 MHz) by India International School Institutional Network. The public broadcaster Doordarshan (Prasar Bharati) provides a regional channel in addition to the private broadcasters.
