= Pilibanga =

- Town
- Location in Rajasthan, India
- Coordinates: 29.488802°N 74.074802°E
- Country: India
- State: Rajasthan
- District: Hanumangarh

Population (2011)
  - Total: 37,288
- Time zone: UTC+5:30 (IST)
- PIN: 335803
- Telephone code: 01508

Pilibanga (also spelt as Pilibangan) is a town and a municipality in Hanumangarh district in the Indian state of Rajasthan.

== Geography ==
Pilibanga is located at 29.45°N 74.08°E. It has an average elevation of 173 m (568 ft).

== Demographics ==
As of 2001 India census, Pilibanga had a population of 33,607. Males constituteted 53% of the population and females 47%. Pilibanga has an average literacy rate of 58%, lower than the national average of 59.5%: male literacy is 66%, and female literacy is 48%. In Pilibanga, 15% of the population is under six years of age.

== Transport ==
Auto rickshaws And Cycle rickshaws are majorly used for internal transport.

Pilibangan is well connected with road and is linked directly to Delhi, Jaipur, Ludhiana, Chandigarh, Sikar, Karnal, Haridwar, Bathinda, Ambala, Jodhpur and many other cities. Nation Highway 15 passes through Pilibangan. Pilibanga railway station has daily train services to Delhi via Bhatinda, Ahmedabad via Jodhpur and Jaipur via Bikaner.

Nearest Airport to Pilibangan is 145 km away in Bhatinda which as direct flight to New Delhi operated by Alliance Air (India).
