= Bhatner fort =

Ancient Indian fortress

- Hanumangarh in India
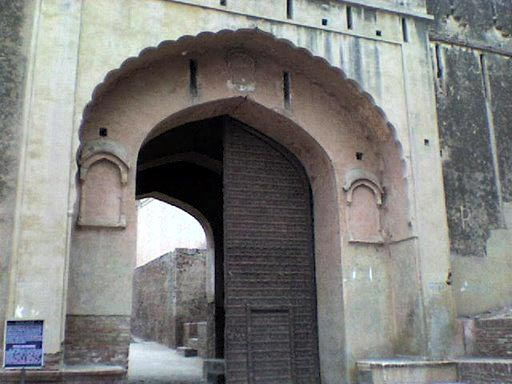
- Entrance to the fort

Site information
- Type: Fort
- Owner: S Parmar

Location
- Coordinates: 29.5863°N 74.3254°E
- Area: 52 bighas

Site history
- Built: 295
- Built by: Bhupat
- Materials: Bricks

The Bhatner Fort was built by son of Rao Bhati, about 419 km northwest of Jaipur along the old Delhi–Multan road and 230 km north-east of Bikaner. Another name of Hanumangarh was Bhatner, which means "fortress of the Bhati". Believed to be 1700 years old, it is considered to be one of the oldest forts of India. Today, this fort is a protected monument under the Archaeological Survey of India.3

== History ==
The ancient fort situated on the bank of River Ghaggar, was built in 295 AD by the King Bhupat of Bhati Dynasty, in memory of his father, Rao Bhatti. There he constructed a safe castle for himself which came to be known as Bhatner. The entire fort is built of bricks, covering an area of 52 bighas. It is in the shape of a parallelogram, with a dozen bastions on each side. Painted Grey Ware (circa 1100-800 BCE) and Rang-Mahal Ware (1st-3rd century CE) have been found in wells situated along the wall.

Bhatner was wrested by Timur by defeating Bhatti King Rai Dul Chand. A mention has been made in "Tuzuk-e-Timuri" (Autobiography of Timur) about this fort and he stated this fort one of the strongest and secured fort of India. Timur invaded India in 1398, when he held a vast empire in the Middle East and Central Asia. He suffered tough resistance in India only from the Bhati ruler, Rai Dul Chand of Bhatner. Rajputs and Muslims fought together against Timur under him but the Bhatner fort was ultimately sacked with the city burnt and laid waste. Also Akbar described it in his book "Ain-I-Akbari". Subsequently, the fort appears to have been held by Bhatis, Johiyas and Chayals until 1527 when it was taken by Rao Jet Singh of Bikaner state. After that, it came twice under Mughal control as well, in addition to being the possession of the royal families of Chayals and Bikaner. Researchers believe that the famous Second Battle of Tarain fought between Mohammad Ghori and Prithviraj Chauhan is the present Talwara Jheel area of the district. This fort stands in the path of invasion of India from Central Asia and had acted as a strong barricade against the attack of enemies. Finally in the year of 1805, it was captured by Soorat Singh of Bikaner and remained with it until the formation of Rajasthan. Since the day of victory was Tuesday (known as day of the Hindu God Hanuman), so he named Bhatner as Hanumangarh.

== See also ==
- Sack of Delhi (1398)
