= Sangaria, India =

City in Rajasthan, India

Sangaria is a town and municipality in the Hanumangarh district of the Indian state of Rajasthan. It is situated near the northern border of Rajasthan adjoining Haryana and Punjab states.

== Demographics ==
At the time of the India census in 2011, Sangaria had a population of 36,436. Males made up 19,111 of the total population and females 17,325. Sangaria has an average literacy rate of 56.34, lower than the state average of 67.06%. Male literacy was 64.40% and female literacy was 47.41%. In Sangaria, 12.09% of the population was under the age of 6 years.

Tehsils include 26 Gram Panchayats, 188 villages and 177 developed villages.

== Geography and climate ==
Sangaria, situated at 29°5′N to 30°6′N and 74°3′E to 75°3′E, shares its boundaries with Haryana state to the east, Sriganganagar district to the west, Punjab state to the north and Churu district to the south. The geographical area of the district is 9,656.09 km^{2} (3,728 sq mi). The climate of the district is semi-dry, extremely hot during the summer and extremely cold during winter. The maximum average temperature varies between 18 and 48 °C and the minimum averages between 0 and 28 °C. The average rainfall during the year is 225 to 300 mm
