= Nohar =

Nohar [City of Regars]
- City
- Location in Rajasthan, India Nohar [City of Regars] (India)
- Coordinates: 29.18°N 74.77°E
- Country: India
- State: Rajasthan
- District: Hanumangarh

Government
  - Type: Municipal Council
- Elevation: 186 m (610 ft)

Population (2011)
  - Total: 49,835
- Time zone: UTC+5:30 (IST)
- Postal code: 335523
- Vehicle registration: RJ 49

Nohar is a city and a municipality in Hanumangarh district in the Indian state of Rajasthan India

== Geography ==
Nohar is at 29.18°N 74.77°E. It has an average elevation of 186 metres (610 feet). Nohar is a semi-arid area and experiences very low rainfall. Summer in Nohar is full of sandstorms and low rainfall owing to poor monsoon. Sometimes, it gets rainfall in winter due to western disturbances. Summer temperature is approximate 49 and in winter 2 to 3 degrees Celsius.
