= Hanumangarh =

City in Rajasthan, India

- City
- Hanumangarh
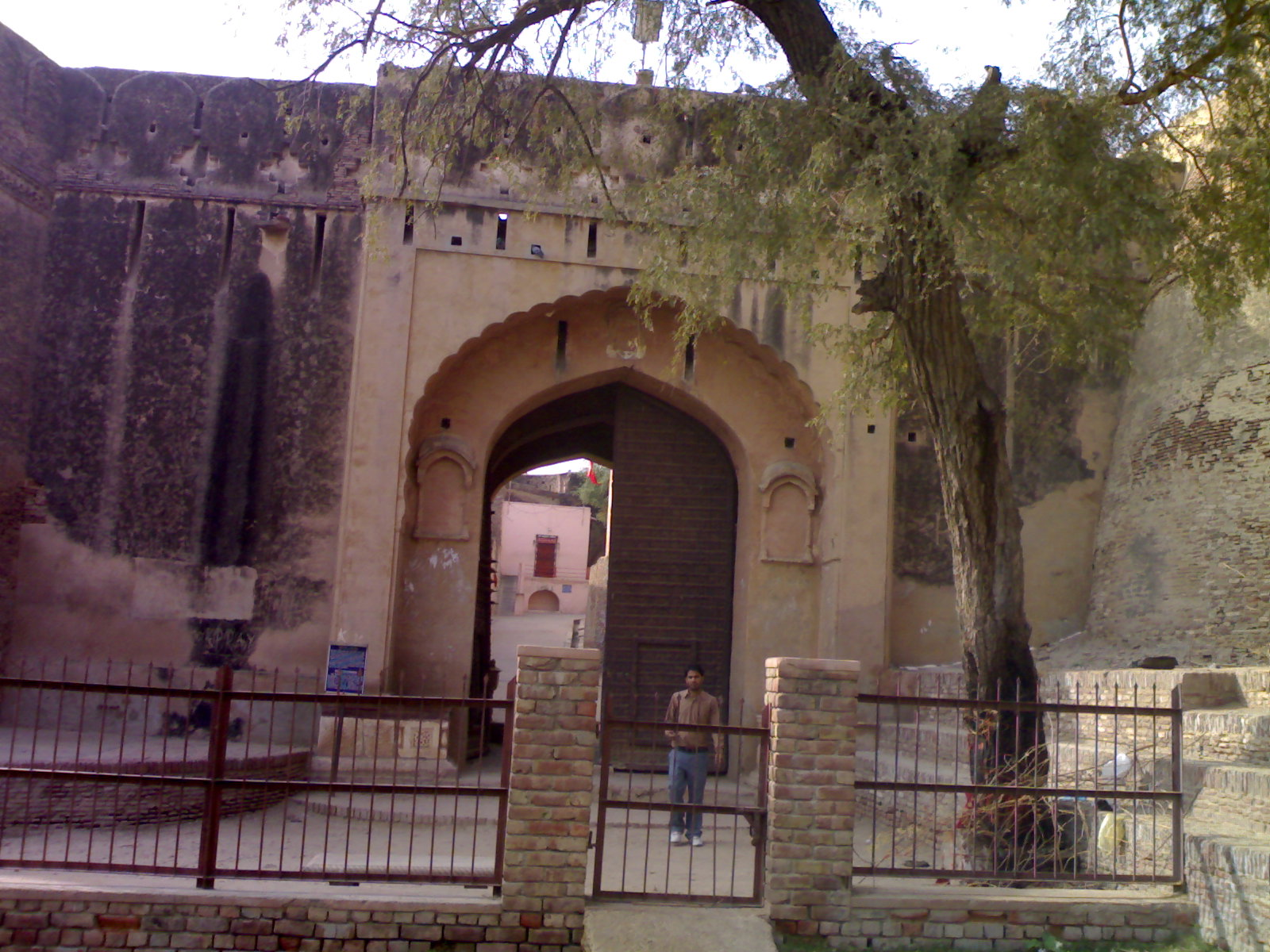
- Bhatner fort

- Location within Rajasthan Location within India Location within Asia
- Coordinates: 29.58°N 74.32°E
- Country: India
- State: Rajasthan
- District: Hanumangarh
- Established: 200; 1826 years ago
- Founder: Bhupat Singh Bhati
- Named for: Hanuman

Government
  - Body: Municipal Council
- Elevation: 177 m (581 ft)

Population (2011)
  - Total: 150,958

Language
  - Official: Hindi
  - Additional official: English
  - Commonly spoken: See § Language
- Time zone: UTC+5:30 (IST)
- PIN: 335512(Hanumangarh Junction) 335513(Hanumangarh Town)
- Telephone code: 01552
- Vehicle registration: RJ-31
- Website: hanumangarh.rajasthan.gov.in

Hanumangarh is a city and municipal council in the Indian state of Rajasthan, situated on the banks of the river Ghaggar, located about 400 km from Delhi. It is the administrative headquarter of Hanumangarh district. The city was once called Bhatner (alternatively spelled Bhatnair) because it was founded by king Bhupat in 255 AD. It remained in the control of the Rajputs of Bhati clan and faced a historic siege by Timur in 1391, during which the Bhati Raput king Dulachand lost the fort for a short time. The fort was later occupied by Rao Jetsa of Bikaner.

== History ==
=== Indus Valley Civilisation ===
Indus Valley Civilisation sites in the district number over 100 villages along Ghaggar-Hakra River (Palaeochannel of Saraswati River), such as Karanpura. Remains found at Kalibangan and Pilibanga in 1951 reveal that this area was a part of nearly 5,000 years old civilisation. The remains of human skeleton, unknown scripts, stamps, coins, utensils, jewellery, toys, statues, wells, bathrooms, fort, streets, markets, etc. were found. The remains found at these places have been kept at Museum at Kalibangan and National Museum of India.

Between 1940 and 1943, Aurel Stein undertook two expeditions to along the Ghaggar-Hakra River to find physical evidence of the Saraswati River described in the Rigveda. His work significantly advanced Indian archaeology. Surveying from Hanumangarh to Bahawalpur, he identified approximately 100 prehistoric and historical sites, conducting exploratory excavations at some.

=== Medieval ===
It has yielded a number of terracotta decorative tiles in the late Kushan Empire style along with a number of coins. Two terracotta capitals at the depth of 15' from the top of the mound with stepped pyramids along their edges have been discovered. In 1398, Timur invaded the Delhi Sultanate and on his way he attacked Hanumangarh Fort (Bhatner at that time) defended by its ruler Rao Daljit and his cousin with only 10,000 men. Timur wrestled the fortifications, slayed all the men and enslaved all of the women and children of the Garrison along with their citizens.

=== Early modern period ===
Hanumangarh was the kingdom of Bhati Rajputs and hence its earlier name was Bhatner. Maharaja Surat Singh Rathore (b.1787 – d.1828) of Bikaner State won this fort on Tuesday. Since Tuesday is the auspicious day of the Hindu deity Hanuman, Surat Singh renamed Bhatner to "Hanumangarh" - the Fort of Hanuman the Hindu-deity. The 1700-year-old Bhatner fort is situated in the middle of Hanumangarh Town, the description of which can be found in Ain-i-Akbari. A famous Bhadrakali temple is situated near the town on the banks of Ancient Saraswati River(Ghaggar river).

== Demographics ==
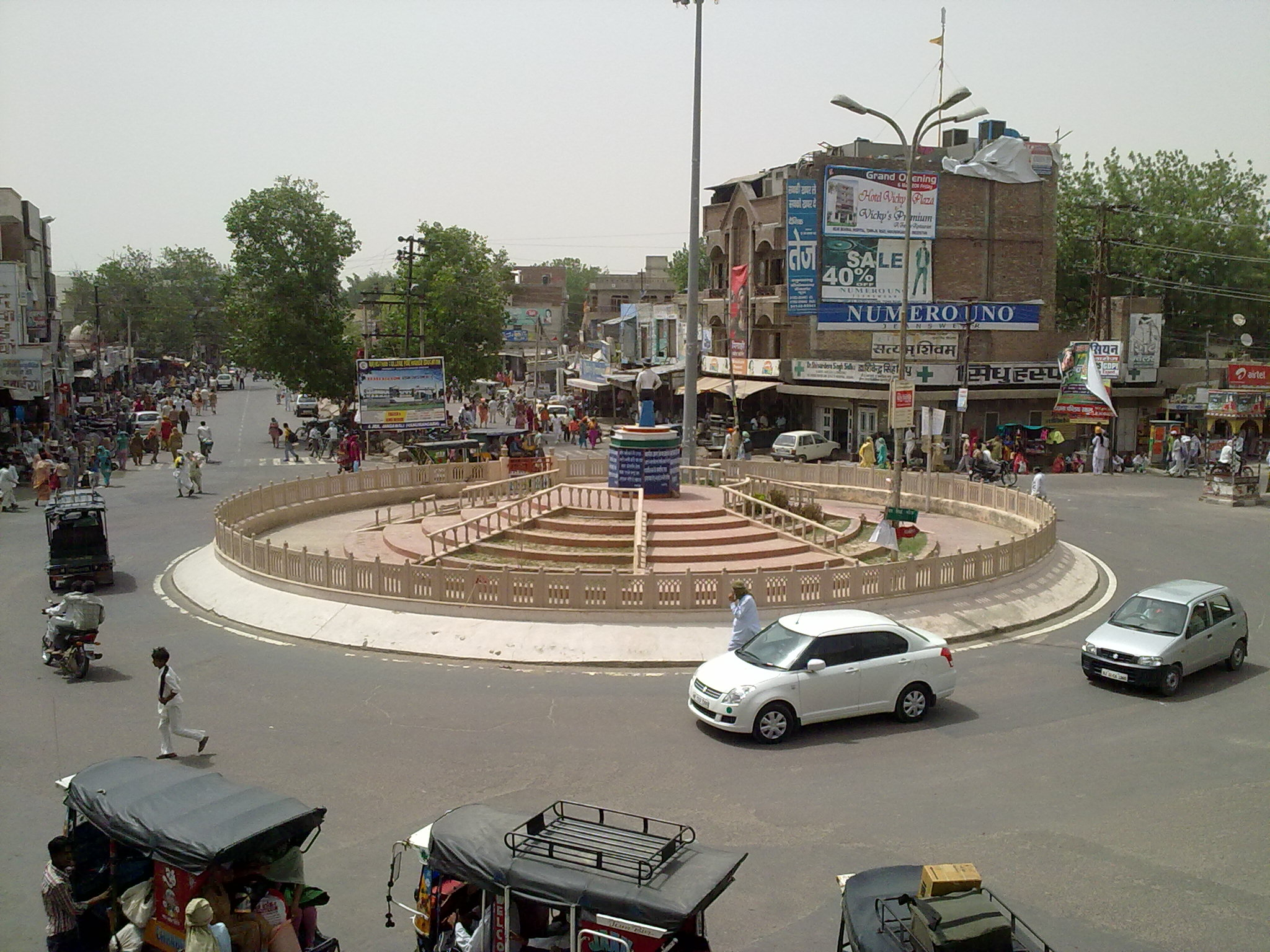
A view of Bhagat Singh Chowk at Hanumangarh Junction.

According to 2011 census of India, Hanumangarh had a total population of 150,958, of which 79,709 were males and 71,249 were females. Population within the age group of 0 to 6 years was 18,094. The total number of literates in Hanumangarh was 102,149, which constituted 67.7% of the population with male literacy of 73.6% and female literacy of 61.1%. The effective literacy rate of 7+ population of Hanumangarh was 76.9%, of which male literacy rate was 83.8% and female literacy rate was 69.28%. The Scheduled Castes and Scheduled Tribes population was 25,486 and 2,463 respectively. Hanumangarh had 30022 households in 2011.

As of 2001 India census, Hanumangarh had a population of 129,654. Males constitute 69,583 of the population and females 60,071. The sex ratio was 863 females to 1,000 males. Population in the age range of 0–6 years was 18,669. 83,923 people were literates in Hanumangarh which is 64.7% of the total population. The effective literacy of people 7 years and over of age was 75.6%.

=== Language ===
Hindi is the official language and English is the additional official language. Rajasthani language is the most commonly spoken language in Hanumangarh, followed by Punjabi, Bagri and Hindi.

== Transportation ==
=== Railway junction ===
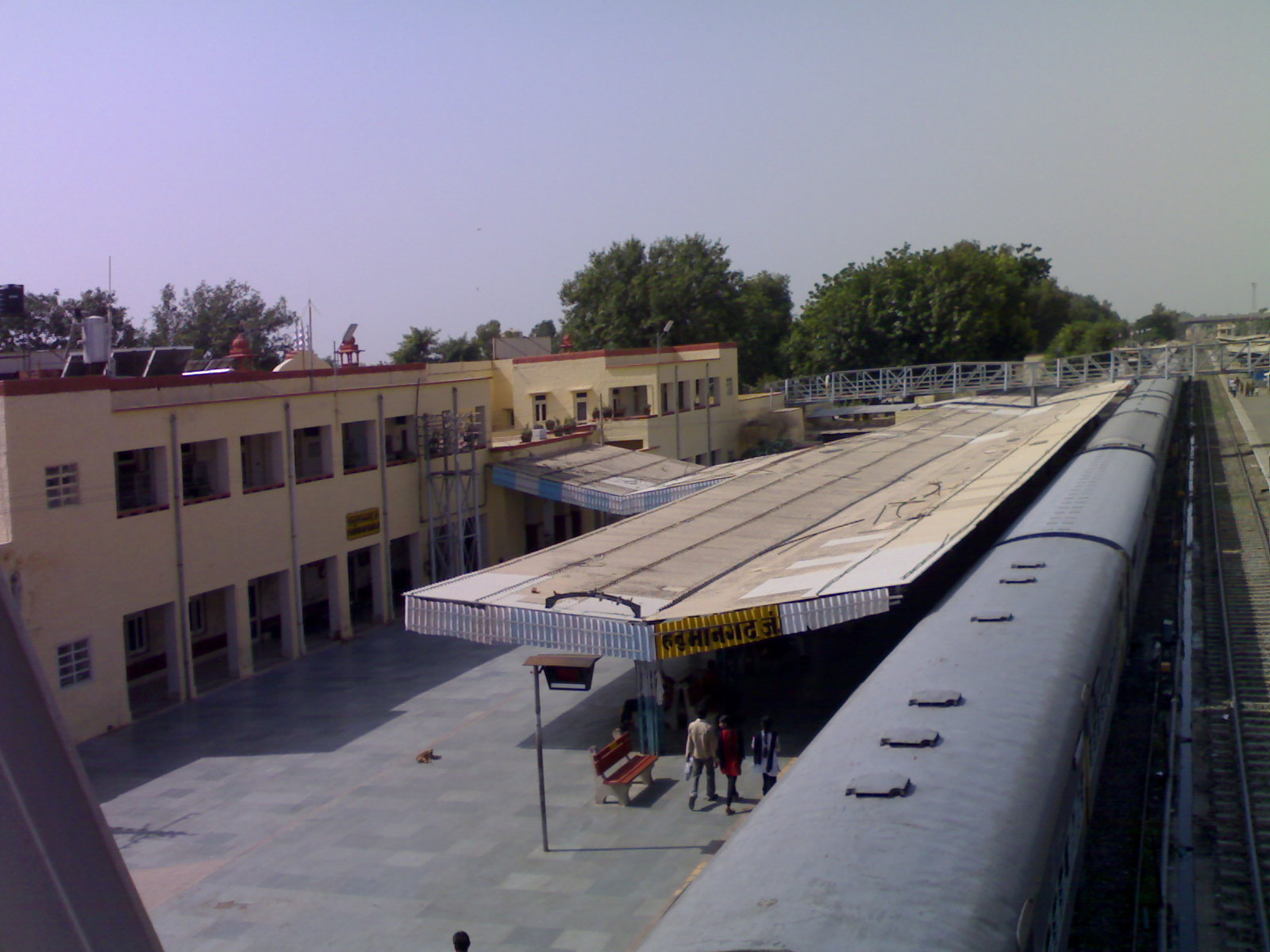
A view of railway station at Hanumangarh Junction.

Hanumangarh Junction railway station is a major railway station on Jodhpur–Bathinda line; Sadulpur, Rewari, Jaipur, Sri Ganganagar, Anupgarh, (Canaloop). Earlier both metre gauge and broad gauge lines passed through this station and now all lines passing through here have been converted to broad gauge. There is also a diamond railway crossing. In 1982, the broad gauge started from Bathinda to Suratgarh via Hanumangarh. On 1 October 2012, Hanumangarh-Sadulpur metergauge track closed and it was converted into broad gauge. Three Hanumangarh to Sri Ganganagar passenger trains are running on the broad gauge track. This track provides smooth rail traffic between two strategically important cantonments at Jaisalmer (Rajasthan) and Udhampur (J&K) via Hanumangarh, Sri Ganganagar and Firozpur.

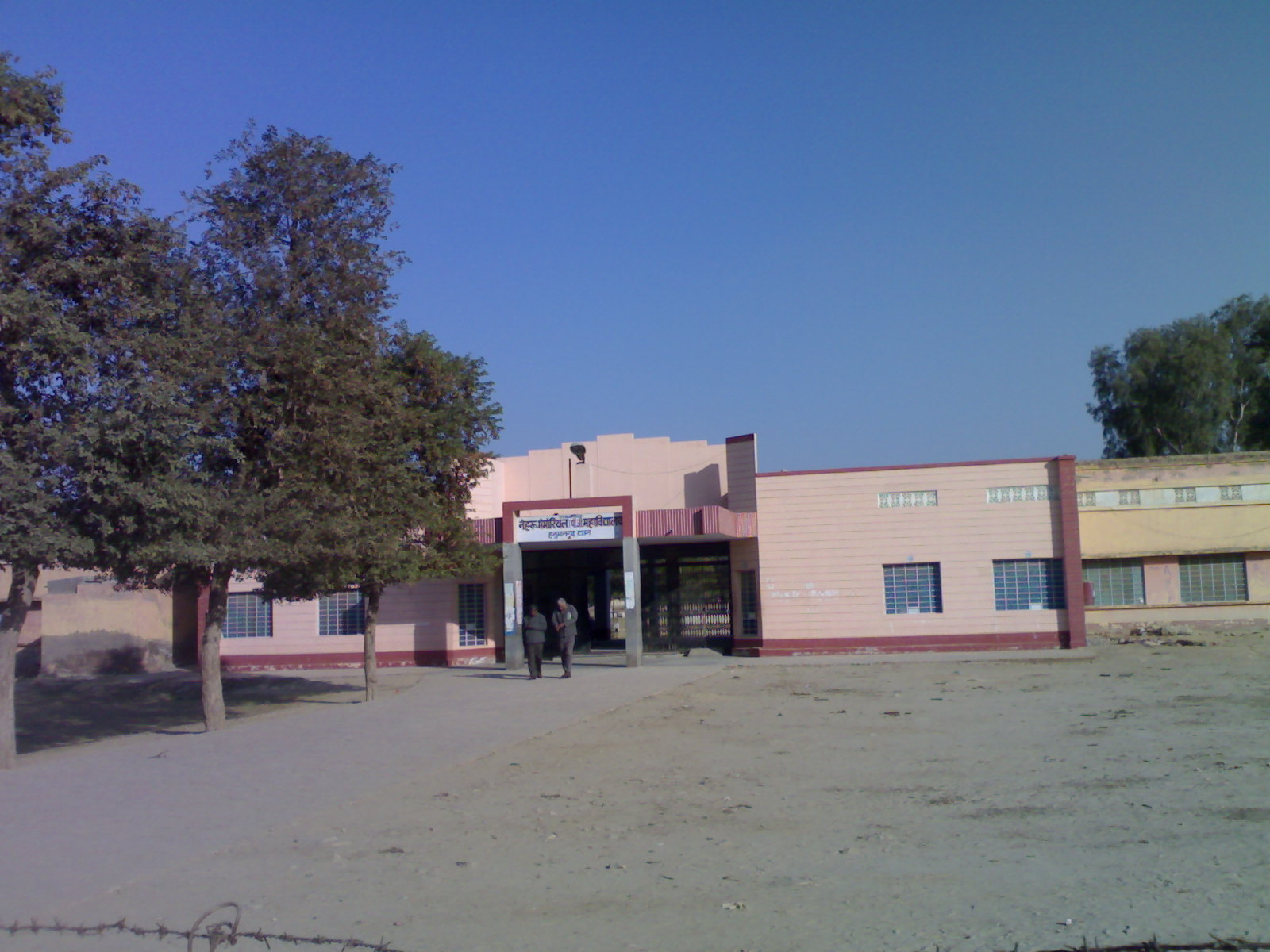
Government Nehru Memorial PG College in Hanumangarh town.
