= Hanumangarh district =

Coordinates: 29°34′48″N 74°19′12″E

- District
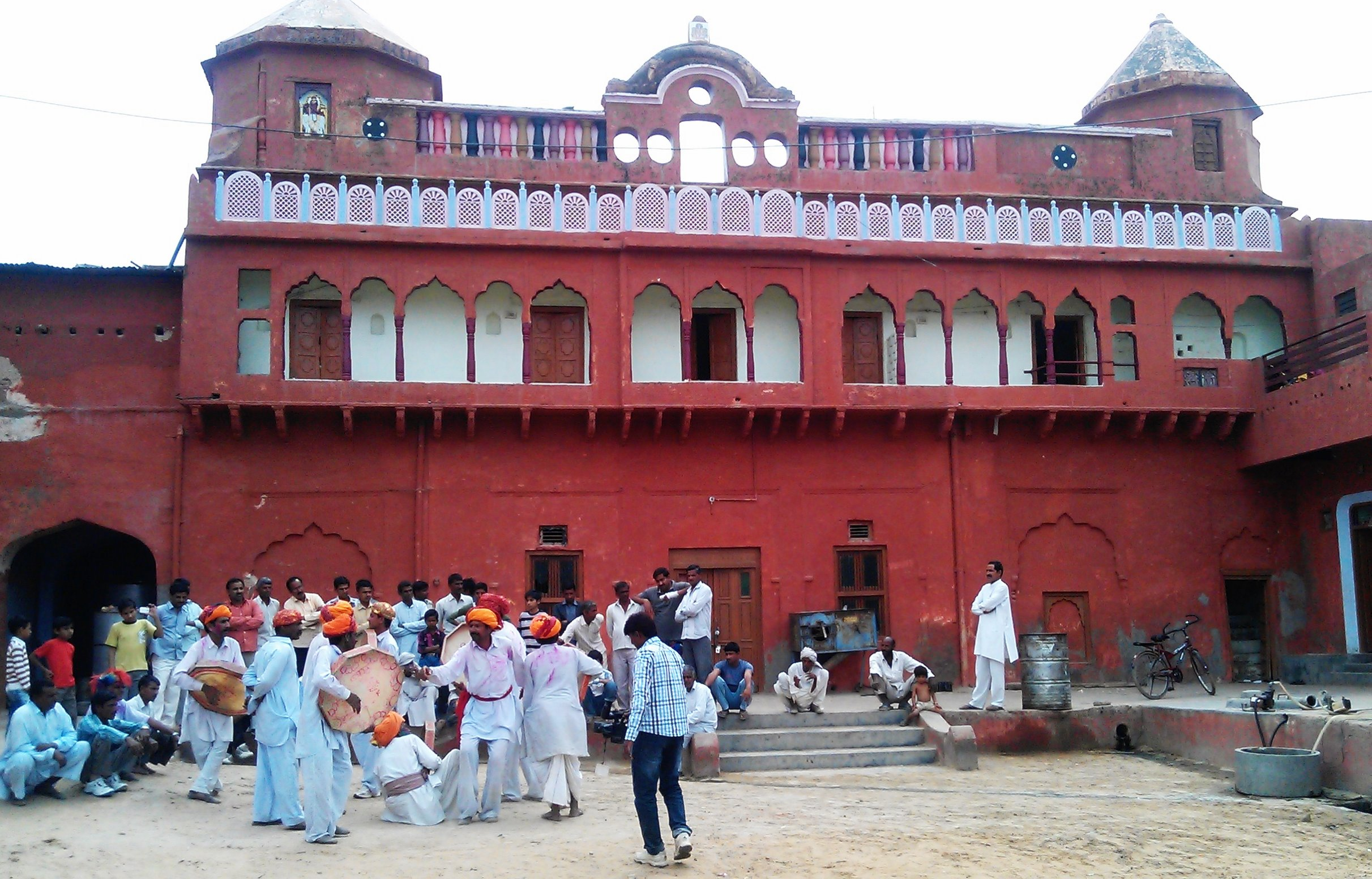
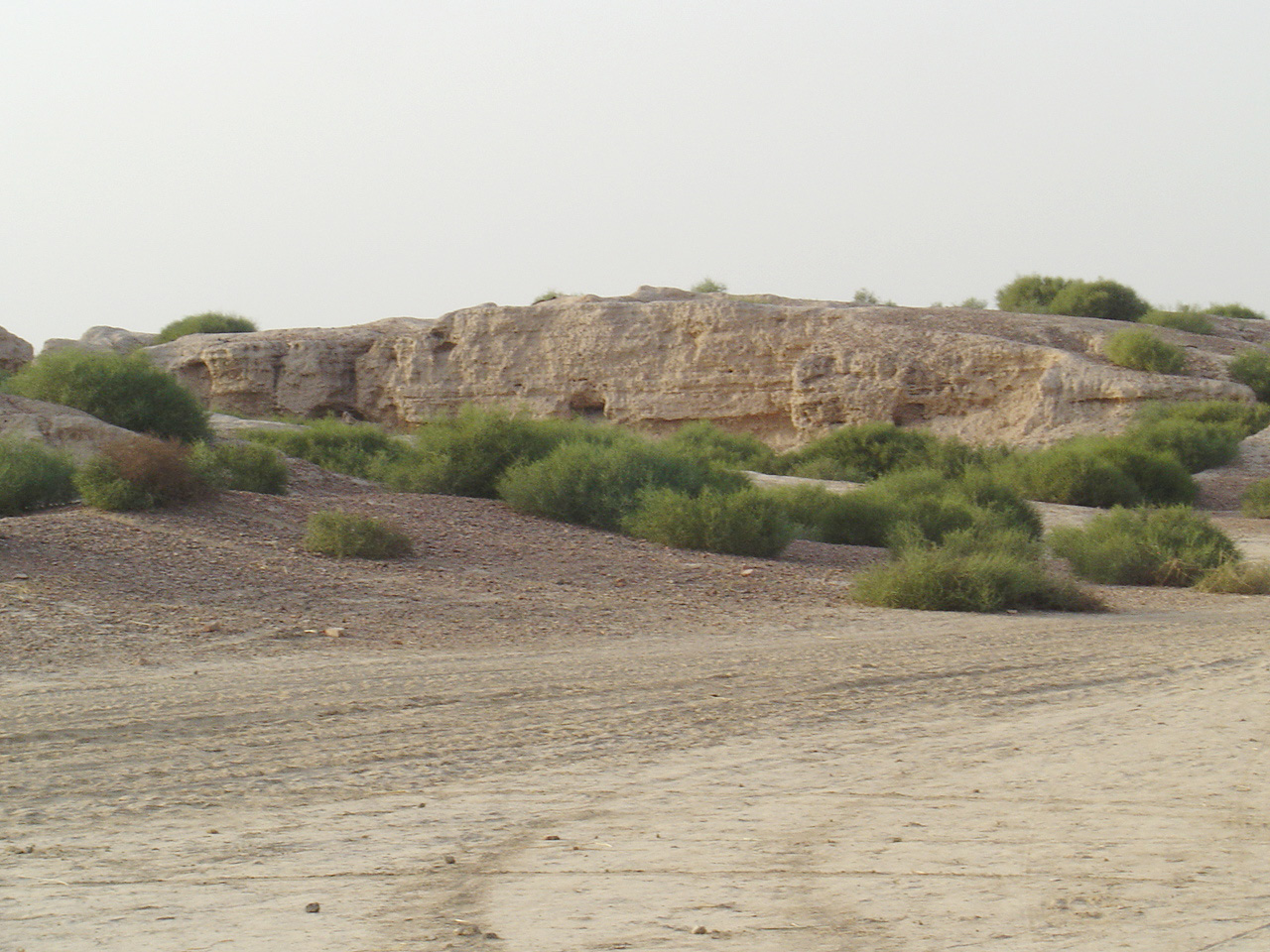
- Top: Ajeetpura Fort; Bottom: Western mound of Kalibangan

- Location of Hanumangarh district in Rajasthan
- Country: India
- State: Rajasthan
- Division: Bikaner
- Headquarters: Hanumangarh
- Tehsils: Hanumangarh, Nohar, Bhadra, Pilibanga, Rawatsar, Tibi, Sangaria, Pallu.

Government
  - District collector: Kana Ram

Area
  - Total: 9,656 km^{2} (3,728 sq mi)

Population (2011)
  - Total: 1,774,692
  - Density: 183.8/km^{2} (476.0/sq mi)

Demographics
  - Literacy: 67.13%
  - Sex ratio: 960/1000
- Time zone: UTC+05:30 (IST)
- Vehicle registration: RJ31, RJ49
- Major highways: National Highway 54
- Website: hanumangarh.rajasthan.gov.in

Hanumangarh district is a district in the state of Rajasthan in India. The city of Hanumangarh is the district headquarters and its largest city. Hanumangarh district is located in northern part of the state.

== District profile ==
The district is located in the extreme north of Rajasthan. It has an area of 12,645 km^{2}, a population of 1,774,692 (2011 census) and a population density of 184 persons/km^{2}. It is bounded in the north by Punjab state, to the northeast by Haryana state, in the east and south by Churu District and in Bikaner District and on the west by Ganganagar District. The major livelihood of the district is farming; major crops include rice, millet, cotton, sonamukhi (senna), wheat, and vegetables. It was made a district on 12 July 1994 from Ganganagar district. Earlier it was one of the Tehsils of Sri Ganganagar district.

Hanumangarh also has Bhatner Fort which is considered to be one of the oldest forts of India.

There are total eight ULB's or municipalities in Hanumangarh district. One municipal council in Hanumangarh city and seven municipal boards in Pilibanga, Sangaria, Nohar, Bhadra, Rawatsar, Tibbi and Goluwala.

There are total 10 Panchayat Samiti in Hanumangarh district are Hanumangarh Jn, Hanumangarh Town, Pilibanga, Sangaria, Tabbi, Nohar, Bhadra, Rawatsar, Pallu and Rajpura (8BHD) and total 325 Gram Panchayats in district.

== Demographics ==
Historical population
| Year | Pop. | ±% p.a. |
|---|---|---|
| 1901 | 59,161 | — |
| 1911 | 84,991 | +3.69% |
| 1921 | 70,360 | −1.87% |
| 1931 | 142,472 | +7.31% |
| 1941 | 220,233 | +4.45% |
| 1951 | 259,892 | +1.67% |
| 1961 | 432,522 | +5.23% |
| 1971 | 661,859 | +4.35% |
| 1981 | 945,807 | +3.63% |
| 1991 | 1,220,333 | +2.58% |
| 2001 | 1,518,005 | +2.21% |
| 2011 | 1,774,692 | +1.57% |

Religion in Hanumangarh district (2011)
| Religion | Percent |
| Hinduism | 80.75% |
| Sikhism | 12.23% |
| Islam | 6.69% |
| Other or not stated | 0.34% |

According to the 2011 census Hanumangarh district has a population of 1,774,692, roughly equal to the nation of The Gambia or the US state of Nebraska. This gives it a ranking of 269th in India (out of a total of 640). Hanumangarh is one of the highest per capita income earning district in India.

The district has a population density of 184 inhabitants per square kilometre (480/sq mi). Its population growth rate over the decade 2001–2011 was 17.24%. Hanumangarh has a sex ratio of 906 females for every 1000 males and a literacy rate of 68.37%. 19.75% of the population lives in urban areas. Scheduled Castes and Scheduled Tribes make up 27.85% and 0.81% of the population respectively.

=== Languages ===
Languages of Hanumangarh district (2011 census)
1. Rajasthani (59.5%)
2. Punjabi (18.0%)
3. Bagri (12.9%)
4. Hindi (6.59%)
5. Marwari (0.94%)
6. Others (2.15%)

At the time of the 2011 census, 59.48% of the population spoke Rajasthani, 17.97% Punjabi, 12.87% Bagri, 6.59% Hindi and 0.94% Marwari as their first language.

==== Punjabi language ====
Punjabi is spoken by 18% of district population. Punjabi has its ground as first language specially in the northern areas like Sangaria, Hanumangarh, Pilibanga tehsils. Punjabi is taught as a language subject in many schools and also chosen by students up to postgraduate level. The Malwayi dialect is most common dialect of Punjabi language spoken. Other languages are Saraiki spoken by Arora Hindu and Rai Sikh communities who migrated from Pakistan after Partition.

== Places of interest ==
- Bhatner fort

== Air pollution ==
According to the World Air Quality Report 2024, Hanumangarh is one of the world's 20 most polluted cities.
