= Shri Ganganagar–Sikar Express =

Express train in India

Shri Ganganagar – Sikar Express
Overview
- Service type: Express
- First service: 10 February 2019; 7 years ago
- Current operator: North Western Railways

Route
- Termini: Shri Ganganagar Junction; Sikar Junction
- Stops: 9
- Distance travelled: 393 km (244 mi)
- Average journey time: 8 hours 8 mins
- Service frequency: Tri-weekly
- Train number: 14715/14716

On-board services
- Classes: AC 1st Class, AC 2 tier, AC 3 tier, Sleeper, General
- Seating arrangements: Yes
- Sleeping arrangements: Yes
- Catering facilities: No Pantry Car Coach attached

Technical
- Rolling stock: ICF coach
- Track gauge: 1,676 mm (5 ft 6 in)
- Operating speed: 140 km/h (87 mph) maximum,49 km/h (30 mph), including halts

The 14715/14716 Shri Ganganagar – Sikar Express is an express train belonging to North Western Railway zone of Indian Railways that run between Shri Ganganagar Junction and Sikar Junction of Rajasthan state in India.

== Background ==
This train was inaugurated on 10 February 2019, from Shri Ganganagar flagged off by Nihalchand, MP of Shri Ganganagar for more connectivity between Shri Ganganagar and Sikar.

== Service ==
Frequency of this train is tri-weekly and it covers the distance of 393 km with an average speed of 49 km/h on both sides.

== Route and halts ==
The important halts of the train are:

- Shri Ganganagar Junction
- Sadul Shahar
- Hanumangarh Junction
- Hanumangarh Town
- Ellenabad
- Nohar
- Tahsil Bhadra
- Sadulpur Junction
- Churu Junction
- Fatehpur Shekhawati
- Sikar Junction

== Schedule ==
Train Number	Station Code	Departure Station	Departure Time	Departure Day	Arrival Station	Arrival Time	Arrival Day
14715	SGNR	Shri Ganganagar Junction	21:40 PM	Tue, Thu, Sat	Sikar Junction	05:50 AM	Sun, Wed, Fri
14716	SIKR	Sikar Junction	23:10 PM	Sun, Wed, Fri	Shri Ganganagar Junction	07:30 AM	Mon, Thu, Sat

== Traction ==
As the route is going to be electrified an WDM-3D loco pulls the train to its destination on both sides.
