= List of villages in Sirsa district =

Sirsa is a district in Haryana, India. The total area of Sirsa is 4,277 km, including 4,218.02 km of rural area and 58.98 km of urban area. Sirsa has a population of 1,295,189. Sirsa is further divided into four tehsils for administrative purposes.

== Sirsa ==
- Nathohar
- Bani
- Bahiya
- Mastangarh
- Amritsar Kalan
- Amritsar Khurd
- Sant Nagar
- Sri Jiwan Nagar
- Ahamadpur
- Alanoor
- Ali Mohammad
- Alikan
- Alipur Titu Khera
- Anandgarh
- Arnian Wali
- Bada Gudha
- Baguwali
- Bhuna
- Bajekan
- Bakarianwali
- Ban Sudhar
- Baruwali Doem
- Baruwali I
- Bhadra
- Bhagsar
- Bhamboor
- Bhangu
- Bharokhan
- Bhavdin
- Bhiwan
- Bhudha Bhana
- Biruwala Gudha
- Brasari
- Buppa
- Burj Bhangu
- Burj Karamgarh
- Chadiwal
- Chaharwala
- Chakkan
- Chak Arian
- Chak Jiwa
- Chak Quasaban
- Chak Suchan
- Chakbani
- Chakerian
- Chamal
- Chattar Garh
- Chauburja
- Chhatrian
- Dadu
- Darban Kalan
- Darbi
- Daulatpur Khera
- Desu Jodha
- Desu Khurd
- Desu Malkana
- Dhaban
- Dharampura
- Dhingtania
- Dhookara
- Ding
- Dogranwali
- Faggu
- Farwain
- Fatehpur Niamatkhan
- Gadli
- Gadrana
- Ganja Rupana
- Ghoranwali
- Gindran
- Ganga
- Gidranwali
- Gigorani
- Gudia Khera
- Gusaiana
- Handi Khera
- Hanjira
- Jamal
- Jasania
- Jhiri
- Jhopra
- Jhorar Nali
- Jhorar Rohi
- Jalalana
- Jodhkan
- Jogiwala
- Jorian
- Kagdana
- Kalanwali Rural
- Kamal
- Kanganpur
- Kanwarpura
- Karamgarh
- Kariwala
- kashi ka bass
- Kasan Khera
- Keharwala
- Kelnian
- Keshopura
- Kewal
- Khai Shergarh
- Khaja Khera
- Kharian
- Khatranwa
- Khairpur
- Kheowali
- Kherekan
- Kheri
- Khuyian Nepalpur
- Kirar Kot
- Kotli
- Kukar Thana
- Kumharia
- Kurangan Wali
- Kusambi
- Kutiana
- Lahenge Wala
- Lakarwali
- Liwal Wali
- Ludesar
- Madho Singhana
- Makho Soran
- Malari
- Malekan
- Malewala
- Manak Diwan
- Mangala
- Manjal thed
- Mattar
- Mauja Khera
- Maujdin
- Mirpur
- Mitthi Sureran
- Mochiwali
- Modia Khera
- Mohamadpur Salarpur
- Moriwala
- Musahab Wala
- Nagoki
- Naharanwali
- Nahrana
- Narain Khera
- Narel Khera
- Nathusari Kalan
- Nathusari Khurd
- Nattar
- Nezadela Kalan
- Nezadela Khurd
- Nezia Khera
- Nirwan
- Odhan
- Pacca
- pathargarh
- Panjmala
- Panjuana
- Panniwala Mota
- Patli Dabar
- Phoolkan
- Raguana
- Raipur
- Rajpura Sani
- Ram Nagaria
- Rampura
- Rampura Bagrian
- Rampura Bisnoian
- Rampura Dhilanwala
- Randhawa
- Ranga
- Rangri Khera
- Rasulpur Split Vill
- Risalia Khera
- Rohan
- Roharan Wali
- Rori
- Rupana Urf Darban Khurd
- Rupawas
- Saharan
- Sahuwala I
- Sahuwala II
- Sanghar Sarishta
- Sawaipur
- Shahidan Wali
- Shahpur Begu
- Shahpuria
- Shakar Khera
- Shakar Mandori
- Shamshabad
- Shekhupuria
- Sarsaiya
- Singhpura
- Sirsa
- Subewala Khera
- Suchan
- Sukhchain
- Surtia
- Tajia Khera
- Takhatmal
- Tarkan Wali
- Taruana
- Tehri Baba Sawan Singh
- Thiraj
- Tilokewala
- Vaidwala

== Rania Tehsil ==
- Abholi
- Abut Garh
- Bacher
- Bahia
- Balasar
- Bani
- Bharolan Wali
- Bhoona
- Bukhara Khera
- Chakkan
- Darewala
- Dhani Satnam Singh
- Dhani Bhagwan Singh
- Dhanoor
- Dhottar
- Dhudian Wali
- Fatehpuria
- Ferozabad
- Ghoranwali
- Gindran
- Haripura
- Harni Khurd
- Jiwan Nagar
- Jodh Puria
- Kariwali
- Keharwala
- Khaja Khera
- Kharian
- Kussar
- Mamer Khera
- Mangalia
- Manjal thed
- Mattuwala
- Mehna Khera
- Mohamad Puria
- Mohranwali
- Naiwala
- Nakora
- Nanuana
- Nathohar
- Nigrana
- Ottu
- Peer Khera
- Rampur Theri
- Rania
- Sadewala
- Sainpal
- Sultanpuria
- Fatehpuriya Niyamat khan

== Dabwali tehsil ==
- Abub Shahar Split Vill
- Ahmadpur Darewala
- Alika
- Asa Khera
- Asir
- Banwala
- Bharu Khera
- Bijuwali
- Chakjalu
- Chatha
- Chormar Khera
- Chutala
- Dabwali
- Desu Jodha
- Dewan Khera
- Faridpur
- Ganga
- Ghukanwali
- Giddar Khera
- Gobindgarh
- Godeka
- Goria Wala
- Habuana
- Hassu
- Jagmalwali
- Jandwal Jattan
- Jandwala Bishnoian
- Jhuti Khera
- Joge Wala
- Jottanwali
- Kaluana
- Khokhar
- Khuyan Malkhana
- Kingra
- Lakhuana
- Lambi
- Lohgarh
- Makha
- Malakpur
- Mangiana
- Masitan
- Matdadu
- Maujgarh
- Mithri, Sirsa
- Modi
- Moonanwali
- Nai Dabwali
- Naurang
- New Rajpura
- Nillanwali
- Nuhiyan Wali
- Odhan
- Pana
- Panniwala Moreka
- Panniwala Ruldu
- Phullo
- Pipli
- Rajpura
- Ramgarh
- Ramnagar
- Rampura Bishnoian
- Ratta Khera
- Risalia Khera
- Sakta Khera
- Salam Khera
- Sanwant Khera
- Shergarh
- Sukheranwala
- Tappi
- Teja Khera
- Tigri
- Kumbhthal
- Kuta Budh
- Mamera
- Mehna Khera
- Mirzapur
- Mithanpur
- Mithi Surera
- Moju Khera
- Mosli
- Neemla
- Patti Kirpal
- Phorka
- Ratta Khera
- Shekhu Khera
- Talwara Khurd
- Thobaria
- Umedpura
