= Madhosinghana =

Madhosinghana (Madho Singhana) is a village in Sirsa tehsil of the Sirsa district in the Indian state of Haryana. The village got its name from a person named Thakur Madho Singh. Situated on the border with Rajasthan, It is a part of the Ellenabad constituency.

== Demographics ==
The village has a population of over 11,250. This village falls under Ellenabad constituency( Constituency No. 46) of Sirsa District. This village has 6331 votes as on 8 October 2021 distributed across 6 polling stations : Station No. 38 (985 votes), 39 (1104 votes), 40(1222 votes), 41 (934 votes), 42 (1132 votes) and 43 (954 votes) as per the Election Commission of India website.

Some "Dhani" people live in the village. Their neighbourhoods are Dhani Khjaan Chand, Dhani Mangat Ram, and Dhani Pala Ram.

== Politics ==
Result of 2019 Vidhansabha Election from the village was as given below: 1. Booth No. 38 - Abhay Singh Chautala(INLD) -433 votes, Pawan Beniwal (BJP) -218 votes, Bharat Singh Beniwal -154 votes 2. Booth No. 39 - Abhay Singh Chautala(INLD) -316 votes, Pawan Beniwal (BJP) -262 votes, Bharat Singh Beniwal -294 votes 3. Booth No. 40 - Abhay Singh Chautala(INLD) -569 votes, Pawan Beniwal (BJP) -230 votes, Bharat Singh Beniwal -170 votes 4. Booth No. 41 - Abhay Singh Chautala(INLD) -305 votes, Pawan Beniwal (BJP) -230 votes, Bharat Singh Beniwal -218 votes 5. Booth No. 42 - Abhay Singh Chautala(INLD) -305 votes, Pawan Beniwal (BJP) -375 votes, Bharat Singh Beniwal -149 votes 6. Booth No. 43 - Abhay Singh Chautala(INLD) -375 votes, Pawan Beniwal (BJP) -233 votes, Bharat Singh Beniwal -163 votes

== Geography ==
It is located between Sirsa and Ellenabad. A Model Town is nearby. It is laid out in a square.

== Religion ==
Madhosinghana has a Sri Patshahi Dasvin Sahib Gurudwara worship area. It is said that the 10th Sikh Guru, Guru Gobind Singh, once stopped there to quench his thirst while fighting.

A large, ancient temple of Lord Shiva is located in the middle of the village, near a lake. It is quite popular in the surrounding region.

The village has one mosque. During the Partition of India, the people of Madhosinghana gave shelter to Muslim families in their houses. The religious harmony in the village is such that the village Hindus give donations to honor the Gurudwara and the mosque, and the Muslims donate in the honor of the Gaushala.

== Facilities ==
- C.H.C. Animal Hospital
- CHC Hospital
- SBI Branch
- 132 kv sub-station

== Education ==
The village has a public schools along with a primary and a Government Senior Secondary School.

- Gramin Pragati Sr. Sec. School, Madhosinghana
- Saraswati Vidya Mandir Sr. Sec. School, Madhosinghana
- Government Senior Secondary School, Madhosinghana
