= Ottu =

OTTU or Ottu may refer to:

- Ottu, Haryana, a village in Haryana state of India
- Ottu barrage, a weir on the Ghaggar-Hakra River in Haryana, India
- Ottu (instrument), a drone-oboe played in Southern India
- Ottu (company), a B2B SaaS fintech company based in Kuwait
- Sampson Ottu Darkoh, a member of parliament in Ghana
- Organisation of Tanzania Trade Unions
- OTTU Jazz Band, Tanzania
- A variety of mango
- Ottu, a Malayalam film
