= Ottu, Sirsa =

Ottu
- village
- Location in Haryana, India Ottu (India)
- Coordinates: 29.545°N 74.940°E
- Country: India
- State: Haryana
- District: Sirsa

Government
  - Type: Panchayati raj (India)
  - Body: Gram panchayat

Languages
  - Official: Hindi
- Time zone: UTC+5:30 (IST)
- ISO 3166 code: IN-HR
- Vehicle registration: HR 24
- Website: sirsa.gov.in

Ottu or Otu is a village under Tehsil Rania in the Sirsa district of Haryana state of India. The village is situated on Sirsa-Rania Road. It is the site of the Ottu barrage on the Ghaggar-Hakra River.
