= Bharukhera =

Bharukhera Bharu Khera
- Village
- Location in Haryana, India Bharukhera (India)
- Coordinates: 29°45′56″N 74°34′06″E
- Country: India
- State: Haryana
- District: Sirsa
- Block: Mandi Dabwali
- Elevation: 198 m (650 ft)

Population (2001)
  - Total: 2,184

Languages
  - Official: Hindi
  - Additional official: English and Punjabi
- Time zone: UTC+5:30 (IST)
- Postal code: 125101
- Telephone code: +91-01745-XXXXXX
- ISO 3166 code: IN-HR
- Vehicle registration: HR
- Sex Ratio: 940:1000 ♂/♀

Bharu Khera, also known as Bharukhera, is a village in Dabwali Tehsil in Sirsa District of Haryana State, India. It belongs to Hisar Division. It is located 61 km towards west from District headquarters Sirsa. There is Savitri Bai Phule Library which was established in the year 2019. It was inaugurated by the then Deputy Commissioner Shri Ashok Ji Garg. It is a public library which provides free education to children.

Bharu Khera is a midsized village located in the district of Sirsa in the state of Haryana in India. It has a population of about 2184 persons living in around 365 households.

== Geography ==
Bharukhera is 279 km from State capital Chandigarh, Kaluana (10 km), Teja Khera (10 km), Ganga (13 km), Giddarkhera (13 km), Bacher (14 km) are the nearby villages to Bharukhera Sangaria, Mandi Dabwali, Hanumangarh, Ellenabad are the nearby cities to Bharukhera. Rajasthan starts 2 km ahead of Bharukheda.

== Physiography ==
The village Bharu Khera lies in semi arid region of Thar Desert and the Aravalli Range. The climate of this village is characterised by its dryness and extremes temperatures and scanty rainfall like all other parts of Sirsa region.

== Administration ==
Bharukhera has a village panchayat for smooth administrative function.

== Utility services ==
Bharu Khera's Electric Supply Undertaking is managed by the UHBVN.BSNL

== Transport ==
Bharu Khera is well connected via Road routes.

=== Roadways ===
There is a district road named Sabuwana road connecting Bharu Khera to Chautala, Sabuwana & Jhandwala serving the purpose of connectivity of nearby towns and villages.

== Healthcare ==
Bharukhera Library and Govt. Middle School

== Employment ==
Most of the people in this village are agricultural farmers who grow cotton as the main cash crop.

== Education ==
There is a Govt. Middle school for the children of the village and nearby area. There is Savitri Bai Phule Library which was established in the year 2019. It was inaugurated by the then Deputy Commissioner Shri Ashok Ji Garg. It is a public library which provides free education to children.
