= Rivers in Himachal Pradesh =

Himachal Pradesh provides water to both the Indus and Ganges basins. The drainage systems of the region are the Chenab, the Ravi, the Beas, the Satluj and the Yamuna. These rivers are perennial and are fed by snow and rainfall. They are protected by an extensive cover of natural vegetation.

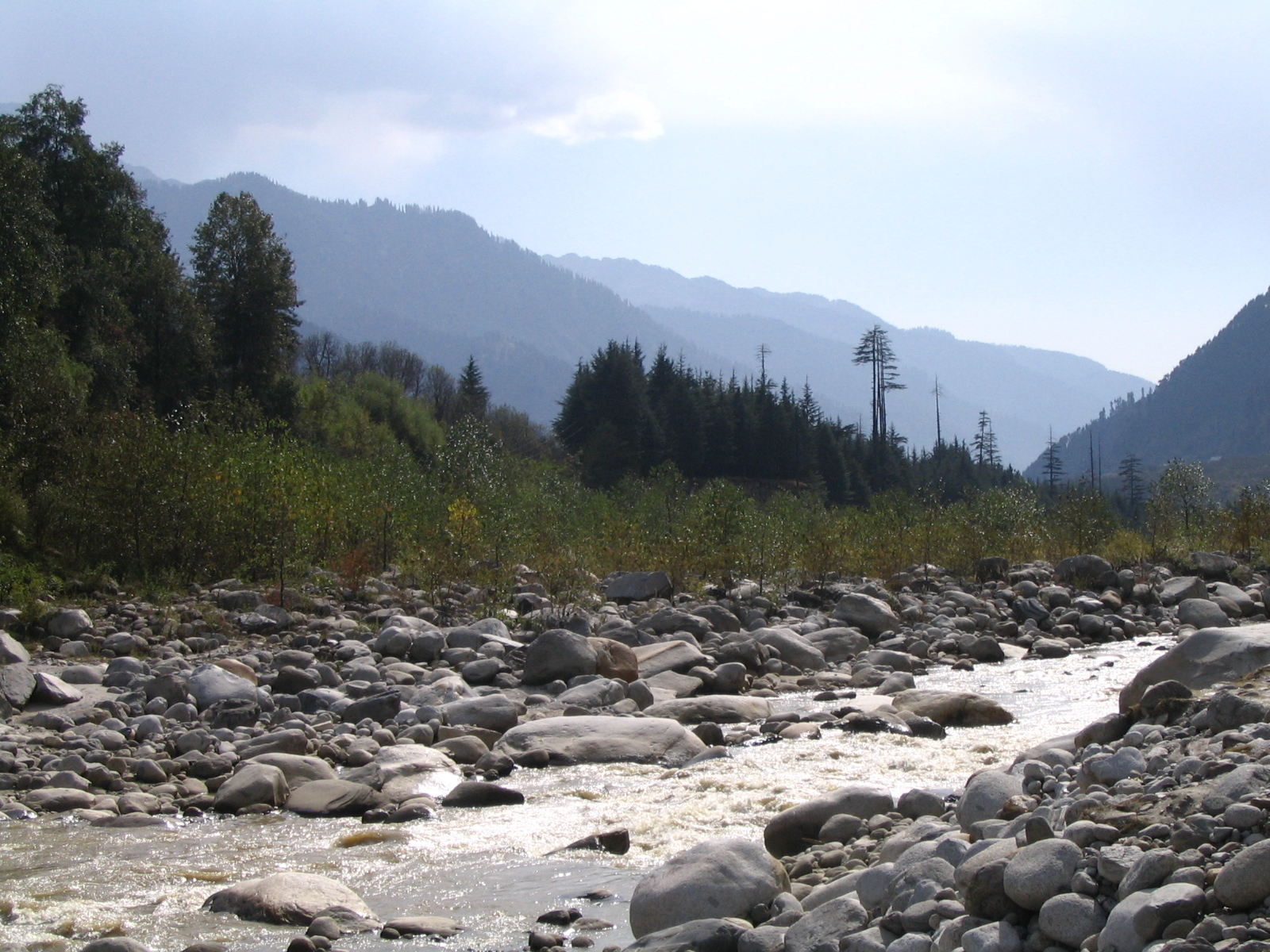
Beas river and mountains as seen from Van Vihar, Manali

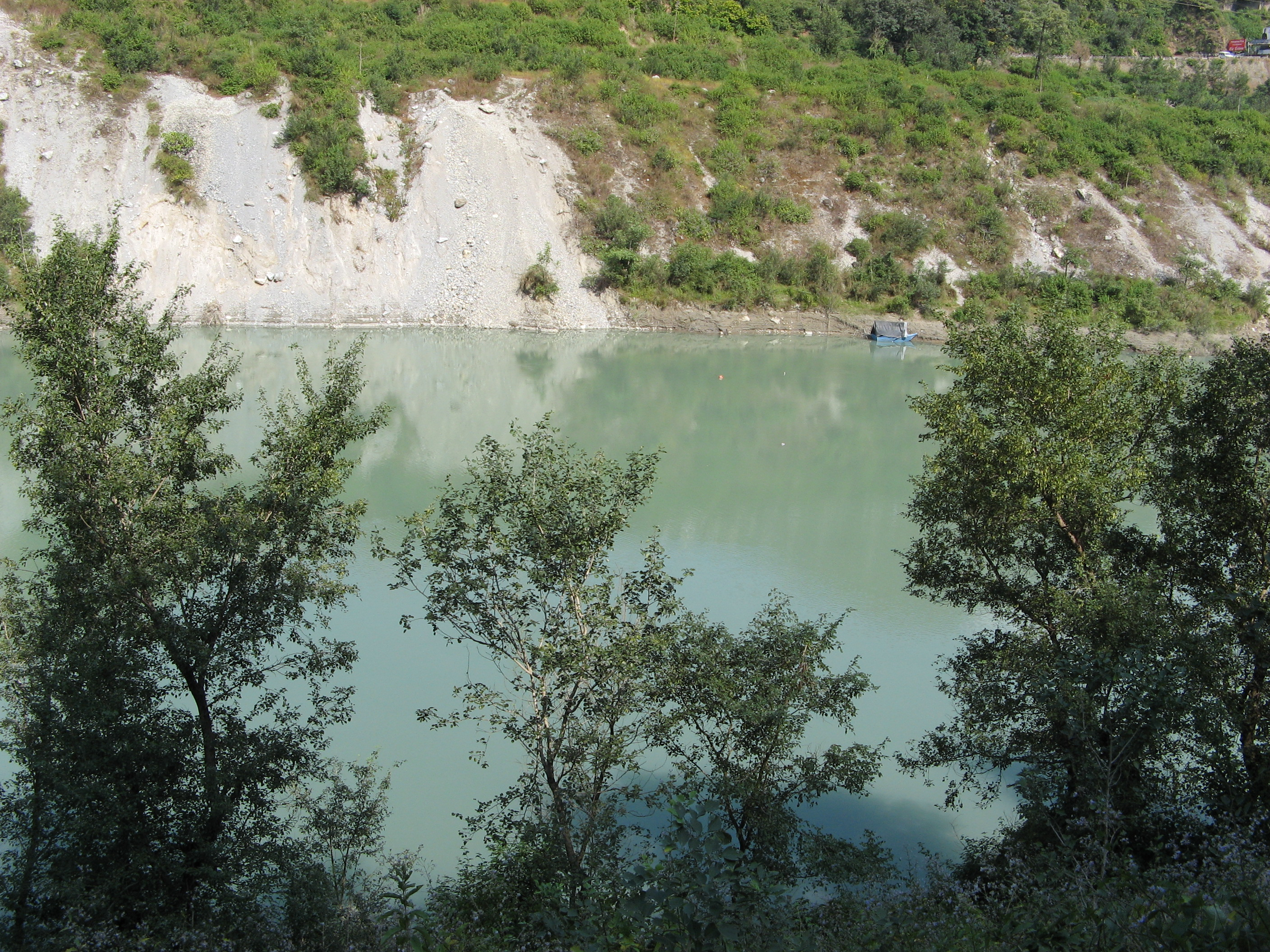
Beas River in Himachal Pradesh

The Beas rises in the Pir Panjal range near the Rohtang Pass and flows about 256 kilometres (159 mi) in Himachal Pradesh. The river is joined by a number of tributaries; the major tributaries are the Parbati, the Hurla, the Sainj, the Uhl, the Suheti, the Luni, the Banganga and the Chaki. The northern and eastern tributaries of the river are snow fed and perennial, while the southern ones are seasonal. During the month of August, increase in the inflow sometimes results in floods.

The Chenab River (Vedic name Askni), the largest river (in terms of volume of water) is formed after the meeting of two streams namely, Chandra and Bhaga at Tandi, in Lahaul. It flows 122 kilometres (76 mi) and covers an area of 7,500 square kilometres (2,900 sq mi) in Himachal Pradesh, before entering Jammu and Kashmir. The Chandra passes through the barren tribal land.

The Ravi is born in Bara Banghal, Kangra district as a joint stream formed by the glacier fead Bhadal and Tantgari. The river is about 158 kilometres (98 mi) long and has a catchment area of nearly 5,451 square kilometres (2,105 sq mi). Chamba lies on its right bank.

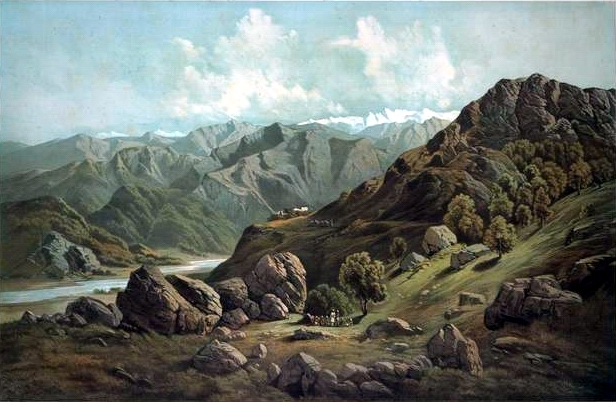
Satluj Valley from Rampur ca. 1857

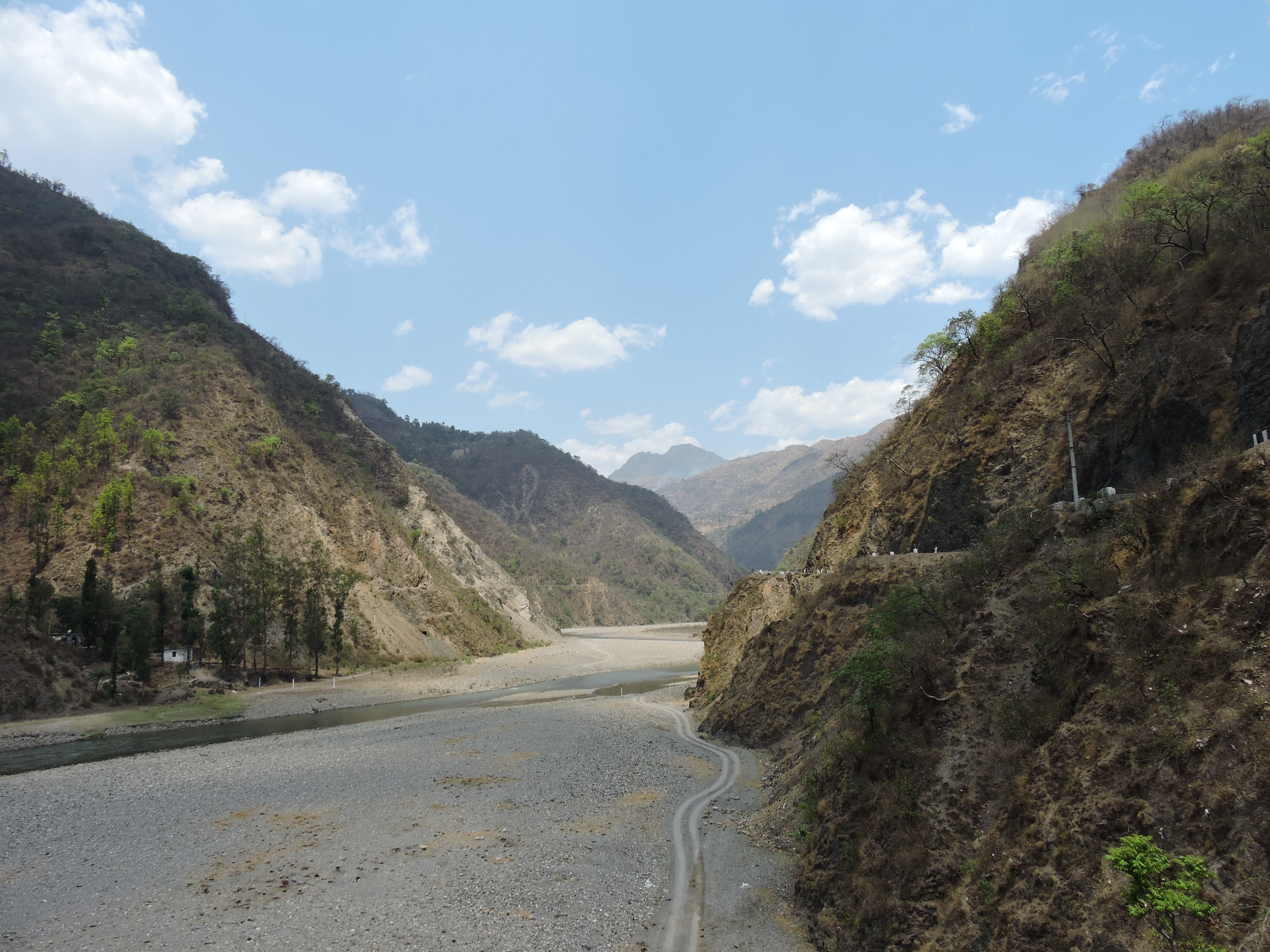
Giri River, Nahan, district Sirmaur, Himachal Pradesh

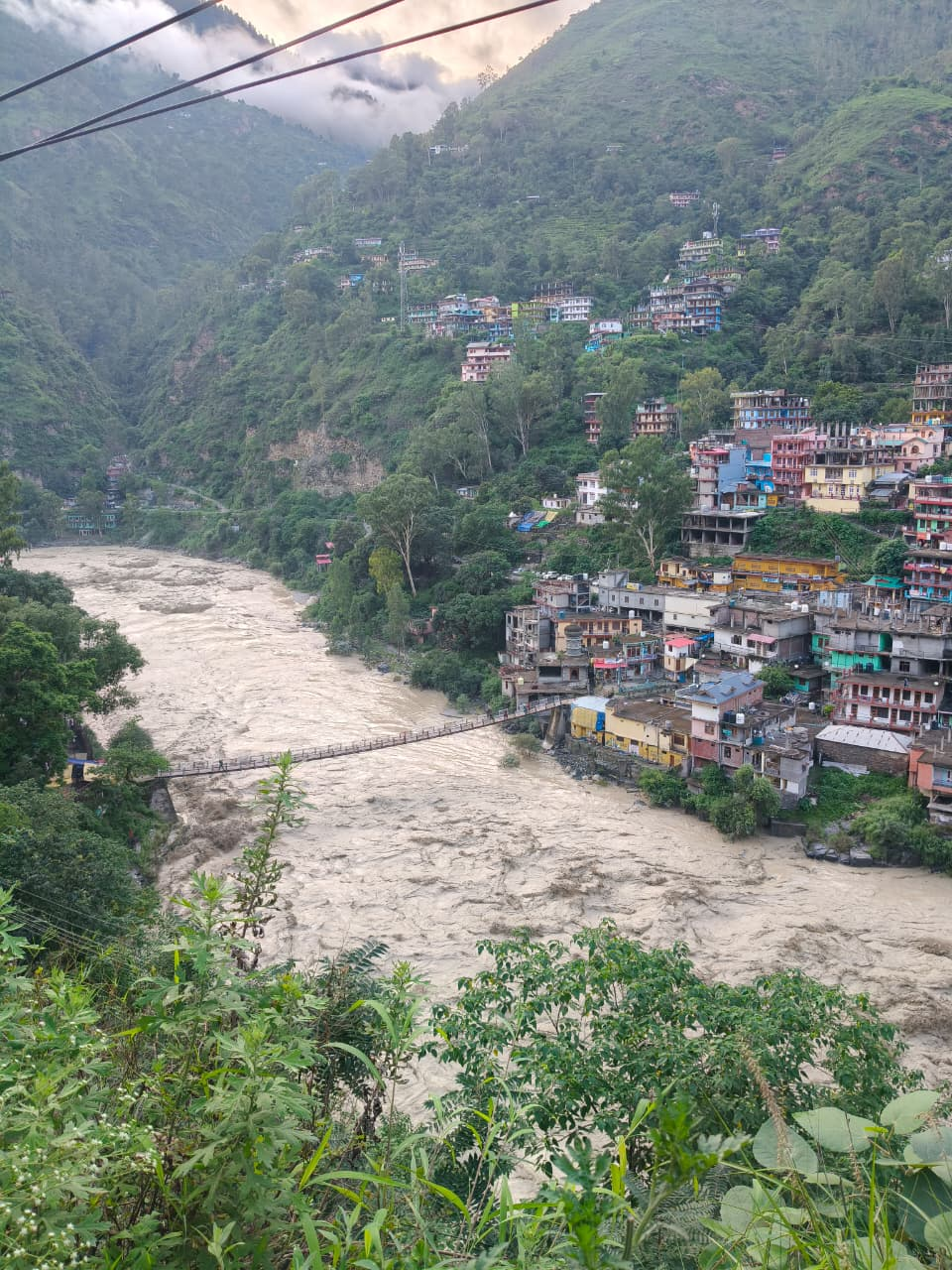
Satluj River Valley, Rampur Bushahr.jpg

The Satluj originates in distant Tibet. The river cuts through both the great Himalayan and the Zaskar ranges and crosses the Indo-Tibetan border (near Shipkila). Then the river Spiti joins Satluj from the north, the Baspa joins it from the south. Passing through gorges it emerges from the mountains at Bhakra. The catchment area of Satluj in Himachal Pradesh is about 20,000 square kilometres (7,700 sq mi).

The Yamuna has its origin in Yamunotri in Uttarkashi district, Uttarakhand. Its total catchment area in Himachal Pradesh is 2,320 square kilometres (900 sq mi). Its tributaries are the Tons, the Giri and the Bata. Of these, Giri and Pabbar (a tributary of Tons) originate and flow in Himachal Pradesh.

The Ghaggar river originates near the village of Dagshai in the Shivalik Hills of Himachal Pradesh at an elevation of 1,927 metres (6,322 ft) above mean sea level and flows through Punjab and Haryana states into Rajasthan; just southwest of Sirsa, Haryana and by the side of Talwara Lake in Rajasthan.
