= Mallekan =

- Village
- Location in Haryana, India
- Coordinates: 29.7°N 75.2°E
- Country: India
- State: Haryana
- District: Sirsa

Population (2019)
  - Total: 10,000

Languages
  - Official: Hindi
  - Additional official: English and Punjabi
- Time zone: UTC+5:30 (IST)
- PIN: 125055
- IFC: 0116900

Mallekan is a village in Ellenabad (sub-division) of Sirsa district, Haryana. The village is about 21.1 kilometres (13.1 mi) from the sub-division Ellenabad and 19.4 kilometres (12.1 mi) from the divisional district headquarters Sirsa. Although the village is located in the inferior part of Haryana (232 kilometres (144 mi) from Chandigarh and Delhi.

== Geography and civil affairs ==
Mallekan is located between Umedpura (3.3 kilometres (2.1 mi)) at the east, Mehna Khera (4.9 kilometres (3.0 mi)) at the west, Kuttabadh (6.9 kilometres (4.3 mi)) at the north and Madhosinghana (5 kilometres (3.1 mi)) at the south.
