= Talwara Lake =

Seasonal lake in Rajasthan, India

Talwara Jheel
- Village
- Location within Rajasthan Location within India Location within Asia
- Coordinates: 29°31′06″N 74°35′27″E
- Country: India
- State: Rajasthan
- District: Hanumangarh district

Languages
  - Official: Hindi
- Time zone: UTC+5:30 (IST)

Talwara Jheel at Tibbi (tehsil) is a small village and a seasonal lake that forms in a depression along the course of the Ghaggar-Hakra River in Hanumangarh district of Rajasthan state of India. Talwara lake is claimed to be the only lake in the arid landscape of Hanumangarh district. The lake forms only for a few months every year during the annual flooding of the Ghaggar-Hakra river in the monsoon season. It is located between Ellenabad and Hanumangarh town, nearly 40 km downstream of the Ottu barrage and reservoir (in the Sirsa district of Haryana). This village population is nearly 15000 and a subtehsil of Hanumangarh district.

== Historical significance ==
This place has been established by historians as the site of the First Battle of Tarain of 1191 and the Second Battle of Tarain of 1192 between Prithviraj Chauhan and Muhammad Ghori.

In his invasion of India in 1398-99 CE, Timur encamped at the banks of this lake after overpowering Bhatner fort in modern-day Hanumangarh.

== See also ==
- List of lakes in India
