= Panniwala Ruldu =

Panniwala Ruldu Panniwala Ruldu
- Village
- Panniwala Ruldu
- Interactive map of Panniwala Ruldu
- Coordinates: 29.884°N 74.832°E
- Established: Around 1400

Population (2011)
  - Total: 2,720
- Time zone: UTC+05:30 (IST)
- Sex Ratio: 914
- Child Sex Ratio (0-6 yrs): 901
- Official language: Hindi, Punjabi
- Nearest City: Kalanwali, Mandi Dabwali
- District: Sirsa

Panniwala Ruldu is a village in Dabwali subdistrict of Sirsa, Haryana, India.

== Education ==
For primary education, there are two schools; one for girls and another for boys. For upper primary education the village has a governmental high school.
