= Dabwali fire accident =

1995 fire accident in Haryana, India

- Date: 23 December 1995
- Venue: Rajiv Marriage Palace
- Location: Mandi Dabwali, Sirsa District, Haryana, India
- Type: Building Fire
- Cause: Ignition of flammable tent canvas due to electric short circuit and subsequent collapse
- Deaths: At least 442
- Injuries: 160

The Dabwali fire accident occurred on 23 December 1995 at Mandi Dabwali, a town in Sirsa district, Haryana in India.

== Incident ==
The incident occurred at the Rajiv Marriage Palace in Dabwali, where the local DAV Public School was holding its annual prize distribution function. A synthetic tent, which had been set up inside the building, caught fire when an electric generator short-circuited. The fire spread quickly and blocked the main entrance; many of the deaths were caused by the resultant stampede as 1,500 people tried to escape through the single exit door. At least 400 people died in the fire, and another 160 were injured, half of them with serious burns. Some sources estimate that up to 540 people were killed, 170 of them being children.

== Aftermath ==
Dabwali Civil Hospital was unable to cope with the number of casualties, so many of the burn victims were sent to nearby towns for treatment. The Christian Medical College in Ludhiana received thirty-two patients, despite having only a six-bed burn unit and inadequate resources. An angry crowd of 5,000 mourners gathered on the streets of Dabwali, deriding the emergency facilities and blocking the police from taking bodies away for cremation.

In January 2003, a one-man commission was set up to investigate the incident, and to calculate the amount of compensation owed to the families of the victims. The commission, headed by Justice TP Garg, demanded numerous extensions and took over six years to conclude its report. Compensation was eventually set at Rs 18cr (3.9 million US$,2003), although in November 2009 the Punjab and Haryana High Court increased the amount to Rs 34cr (7.4 million US$,2003), and added an extra 6% interest to make up for the delay. The money was to be jointly supplied by the DAV trust and the Haryana government, and shared among the families of 446 victims. However, the DAV appealed against the decision, claiming that the amount was excessive, and that the school should not be responsible for compensating the families. The court replied that they hadn’t carried out adequate fire safety checks, and directed them to pay an interim compensation of Rs 10cr(2.2 million US$, 2003) before the appeal could be heard.

Members of the Dabwali Fire Victims Association, formed by the survivors and the families of the dead, feel that not enough has been done to ensure that the tragedy will never be repeated. They claim that after sixteen years, the necessary fire safety regulations have still not been put in place. They have also expressed disappointment that the government’s promises of a new 100-bed hospital and burn treatment centre have yet to be fulfilled.
