= Suchan =

Suchan may refer to:

- Suchan, a village in Sirsa District, Haryana, India
- A former name of Partizansk, Russia
- Suchan River, now Partizanskaya River, Russia
- Suchań, a town in Poland
- Sucháň, a village in Slovakia
