= Chadiwal =

- village
- Location within Haryana Location within India
- Coordinates: 29°26′18″N 75°07′34″E
- Country: India
- State: Haryana
- District: Sirsa
- Established: 1819
- Founder: Chandi Khan

Population (2011)
  - Total: 1,800 Approximately

Languages
  - Official: Hindi
- Time zone: UTC+5:30 (IST)
- Postal code: 125110
- ISO 3166 code: IN-HR
- Vehicle registration: HR-24
- Coastline: 0 kilometres (0 mi)
- Website: haryana.gov.in

Chadiwal is a village in Sirsa District of Haryana State, India. It is said to have been settled in 1896 AD by a Muslim named Chadi Khan. But there is evidence of its settlement before 1896 AD in Bai-Bhat (a person who has the lineage of a particular gotra of the village) of Beniwal gotra. In this village mainly residents of Beniwal, Godara, Saharan, Bhattu and Birda gotra of Jat caste are more. People of Brahmin, Harijan and Valmiki caste also reside in the village.

== History ==
According to the ancient story, Sardara Beniwal started living in Chadiwal from Bhojasar village of Rajasthan's Bhadra tehsil. But Muslim people from the nearby village Ali-Muhammad used to rob and harass the villagers, so Sardara brought his relative brother Keshu Beniwal from Jatan village of Rajasthan and settled here in 1839 AD and also gave half of his agricultural land. The descendants of Sardara are called Bhojsaria and the descendants of Keshu are called Jatania.

== Agriculture ==
Almost all the land in the village is cultivable and most of the people are associated with agriculture. Irrigation is done by canal and tube well.

== Life status ==
The living standard of the people of the village is very good, there is no lack of literacy among the people and equal attention is given to the education and upbringing of girls. famous people = ch. mansukh ram beniwal ch. bhagwan singh beniwal raj beniwal (cricket)

- http://www.geonames.org/6697551/chadiwal.html
- http://www.geonames.org/6697552/8th_mile.html
