= Jagdish Nehra =

Indian politician (died 2023)

Minister of Education and Irrigation, Government of Haryana
- Minister: Parliamentary Affairs and Irrigation Minister
- Constituency: Rania, Sirsa
- Constituency: Rori
- Constituency: Bhattu Kalan

Personal details
- Born: c. 1943 Bhakran Wali, Sangria, British India
- Died: 18 January 2023 (aged 79)
- Party: Indian National Congress
- Children: 2
- Education: MA LLB
- Alma mater: Delhi University, Kurukshetra University, Panjab University
- Profession: Agriculturist and Business
- Profile

Jagdish Nehra (c. 1943 – 18 January 2023) was an Indian politician who served as Education and Irrigation Minister in Haryana and Chairman of Haryana Hindi Granth Academy. He took a number of steps to improve the standard of education in Haryana. He promoted use of Hindi in offices.

Nehra graduated with a Bachelor of Arts degree from Punjab University in 1963, followed by an L.L.B. from Delhi University in 1966. He did his masters in Mass Communication from Kurukshetra University in 2003.

Nehra died on 18 January 2023, at the age of 79.

== Timeline ==
- From 1973 to 1977, he was general secretary district youth congress, Sirsa.
- In 1977 he contested the Haryana legislative assembly election against (Partap Singh) s/o late (sh. Devi Lal) from Rori Sirsa.
- From 1977 to 1982, he served as president, district congress committee, Sirsa.
- In 1982 he contested election against (Partap Singh) and won the election.
- From 1982 to 1987, he was education minister.
- In 1987 he contested election against sh. Ranjit Singh from Rori.
- From 1987 to 1989, he was gen. secretary HPCC. 1989-91 he was president district congress committee Sirsa.
- From 1991 to 1996, he was irrigation and parliamentary affairs minister.
- In 1996 he contested election against sh. Om Parkash Chautala from Rori.
- From 2000 to 2005, he was A.I.C.C. delegate.
- In 2000 he contested assembly election against sh. Sampat Singh from Bhattu (Fatehabad/Hisar).
- In 2005 he contested assembly election against sh. Om Parkash Chautala from Rori (Sirsa).
- In 2006 he was vice-president of H.P.C.C.-up till 13 July 2014
- From 1973 to 14 July 2014, he was in congress.
- On 14 July 2014, Nehra joined the Bhartiya Janta Party.
- On 11 October 2021, Nehra returned to the Indian National Congress.
