= Ranakpur Express =

Train in India

Overview
- Service type: Express
- Locale: Rajasthan, Gujarat & Maharashtra
- First service: 15 August 1998; 28 years ago
- Current operator: North Western Railway

Route
- Termini: Hanumangarh (HMH); Dadar Western (DDR)
- Stops: 38
- Distance travelled: 1,451 km (902 mi)
- Average journey time: 25 hours 45 minutes
- Service frequency: Daily
- Train number: 14707 / 14708

On-board services
- Classes: AC 2 Tier, AC 3 Tier, Sleeper Class, General Unreserved
- Seating arrangements: Yes
- Sleeping arrangements: Yes
- Catering facilities: On-board catering, E-catering
- Observation facilities: Large windows
- Baggage facilities: Available
- Other facilities: Below the seats

Technical
- Rolling stock: LHB coach
- Track gauge: 1,676 mm (5 ft 6 in)
- Operating speed: 130 km/h (81 mph) maximum, 56 km/h (35 mph) average including halts.
Route map
- via Suratgarh, Bikaner, Nagaur, Jodhpur, Pali, Ahmedabad, Surat, Valsad

The 14707 / 14708 Ranakpur Express is an express train belonging to Indian Railways that runs between Hanumangarh Junction and Dadar in India. It operates as train number 14707 from Hanumangarh to Dadar Western and as train number 14708 in the reverse direction.

It is named after the village of Ranakpur which is located in the Pali district of Rajasthan.

== Coaches ==
The 14707/14708 Ranakpur Express presently has 2 AC 2 tier, 6 AC 3 tier, 1 AC 3 Economy tier, 7 Sleeper Class 4 General Unreserved coaches and 2 seating cum luggage rake.

As with most train services in India, coach composition may be amended at the discretion of Indian Railways depending on demand.

== Service ==
The 14707 Ranakpur Express covers 1454 kilometres in 26 hours 20 mins (57 km/h) and the 14708 Ranakpur Express covers the same distance in 27 hours 55 mins as (51 km/h).

== Route and halts ==
The 14707/14708 Ranakpur Express runs from Dadar via Borivali, Palghar, Vapi, Surat, Vadodara, Ahmedabad Junction, Palanpur, Abu Road, Falna, Marwar Junction, Luni Junction, Jodhpur, Gotan, Merta Road Junction, Nagaur, Bikaner, Lalgarh Junction, Lunkaransar, Suratgarh Junction, Pilibanga to Hanumangarh Junction.

== Schedule ==
Train number	Station code	Departure station	Departure time	Departure day	Arrival station	Arrival time	Arrival day
14707	HMH	Hanumangarh Junction	05:25 AM	Daily	Dadar	07:10 AM	Daily
14708	DDR	Dadar	12:35 PM	Daily	Hanumangarh Junction	04:55 PM	Daily

== Traction ==
It is now hauled by a Vadodara Loco Shed or Valsad Loco Shed based WAP-5 / WAP-7 electric locomotive from Dadar Western to Hanumangarh Junction and vice versa.

== In popular culture ==
The train was mentioned in The Big Bang Theory, Season 2, Episode 17 ("The Terminator Decoupling").
