= Ottu barrage =

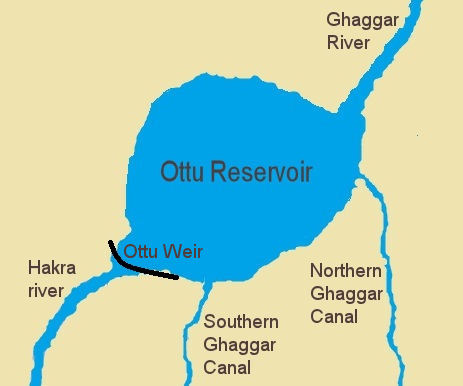
- Ottu barrage and reservoir on the Ghaggar-Hakra River in Sirsa, Haryana, India

- Location within India Location within Haryana
- Official name: Ottu barrage
- Country: India
- Location: Sirsa, Haryana
- Coordinates: 29°29′21″N 74°54′38″E
- Status: Operational
- Construction began: 1896

Dam and spillways
- Impounds: Ghaggar Rivers
- Spillways: Hakra River

Reservoir
- Creates: Water supply & Irrigation

The Ottu barrage, sometimes spelled as the Otu barrage and also known as Ottu Head, is a masonry weir on the Ghaggar-Hakra River in Sirsa, Haryana state of India that creates a large water reservoir out of the formerly-small Dhanur lake, located near the village of Ottu, which is about 8 miles from Sirsa City in Haryana, India. It is a feeder for the two Ghaggar canals (the Northern Ghaggar canal and the Southern Ghaggar canal) that carry irrigation water to northern Haryana state. In 2002, a new tourist complex was inaugurated at the barrage, and it was given the honorary name of "Chaudhary Devi Lal Weir" to commemorate the former Chief Minister of Haryana state, Chaudhary Devi Lal. The Dhanur lake reservoir is now often referred to simply as the Ottu reservoir.

== Construction ==
The Ottu barrage was constructed in 1896-97 using low-cost labor that was available due to a famine in the region at that time. Prior to the construction of the barrage and its associated reservoir and canals, agriculture in the then princely state of Bikaner had come under pressure from fluctuating water-supply in the monsoon season caused by diversions in the Ghaggar by riparian farmers further upstream. The barrage and canals cost 6.3 lakh rupees to construct, 2.8 lakhs of which was paid by the princely state of Bikaner and the remainder by the British-run Government of India.

== Historical confusion with Talwara lake ==
It was once assumed by some historians that Ottu lake was the site where Timur had encamped after overpowering Bhatnair fort in Hanumangarh (Rajasthan) during his invasion of India in 1398-99 CE. However, it is now known that the actual site of his camp, which he described as being Kinar-e-Hauz (i.e. on the banks of a tank or lake), was at the banks of Talwara Lake, which is further 40 km downstream in Hanumangarh district between Ellenabad and Hanumangarh town.

== See also ==
- Ghaggar-Hakra River
- History of Bikaner
- Talwara Lake
- List of lakes in India
- List of dams and reservoirs in Haryana
