= Sadul Shahar railway station =

Railway station in Rajasthan, India

Sadul Shahar

General information
- Location: Sadul Shahar, Shri Ganganagar district, Rajasthan; India
- Coordinates: 29.902857°N 74.172193°E
- Elevation: 183 metres (600 ft)
- System: Indian Railways station
- Owner: Indian Railways
- Operator: North Western Railway
- Line: Shri Ganganagar–Sadulpur line
- Platforms: 2
- Tracks: 3

Construction
- Structure type: Standard (on ground station)
- Parking: Yes

Other information
- Status: Functioning
- Station code: SDS
- Zone(s): North Western Railway
- Division(s): Bikaner

History
- Opened: 1923
- Rebuilt: 2014
- Electrified: 2025(operational)
Location
- Location within India Location within Rajasthan

Sadul Shahar railway station is a railway station in Shri Ganganagar district, Rajasthan. Its code is SDS. It serves Sadul Shahar town. The station consists of 2 platforms. Passenger, Express, and Superfast trains halt here.

== Trains ==
The following trains halt at Sadul Shahar railway station in both directions:

- Firozpur Cantonment–Shri Ganganagar Express
- Kota–Shri Ganganagar Superfast Express
- Hazur Sahib Nanded–Shri Ganganagar Express
- Amrapur Aravali Express
