= Shri Ganganagar–Sadulpur line =

Railway line in India

Overview
- Status: Operational
- Owner: Indian Railways
- Locale: Rajasthan and Haryana
- Termini: Shri Ganganagar Junction; Sadulpur Junction

Service
- Operator: North Western Railway

History
- Opened: 13 November 1930

Technical
- Line length: Main line 244 km (152 mi)
- Track gauge: 1,676 mm (5 ft 6 in) Broad Gauge
- Old gauge: 1,000 mm (3 ft 3 3/8 in) Metre gauge
- Electrification: Yes
- Operating speed: 110 km/h

The Shri Ganganagar–Sadulpur line or Sri Ganganagar–Hanumangarh–Ellenabad–Sadulpur line is a railway route on the North Western Railway zone of Indian Railways. This route plays an important role in rail transportation of Bikaner division of Rajasthan state and Ellenabad portion of Sirsa district of Haryana.

The corridor passes through the Desert Area of Rajasthan and some portion of green fields of Ghaggar basin in Haryana near Ellenabad with a total combined stretch of 244 km with one reversal at Hanumangarh Junction which connects Jodhpur–Bathinda line.

== History ==
The main railway line from Shri Ganganagar Junction to Sadulpur Junction via Hanumangarh Junction was originally built by Bikaner State Railway company of Bikaner Princely State portion as metre-gauge line was constructed on different phases.

- The first phase, from Sri Ganganagar Junction to Sadulshahr was opened on 1 April 1923.
- The second phase, from Sadulshahr to Hanumanagarh Junction was opened on 27 August 1923.
- The third phase, from Hanumangarh Junction to Ellenabad was opened on 15 September 1927.
- The fourth phase, from Ellenabad to Tahsil Bhadra was opened on 16 September 1928.
- The Fifth phase, from Tahsil Bhadra to Sadulpur Junction was opened on 13 November 1930.

After that, the conversion of main line into 5 ft 6 in (1,676 mm) broad gauge was sanctioned in 2006–07, Which is another important line for military purpose because this railway line also connects to the Jodhpur–Bathinda railway line which it lies nearest of International border of India, was opened in different sections.

- The first phase, between Shri Ganganagar and Hanumangarh Junction was opened on 29 January 2014.
- The second phase, between Hanumangarh Juncrion and Suratpura Junction was opened on 24 May 2016.

== Electrification ==
Currently this route is fully electrified and functional. Electrification was divided into three sections, the first section was Sadulpur Junction–Nohar, the second section was Nohar–Hanumangarh Junction and the third section was Hanumangarh Junction–Shri Ganganagar Junction. The first section got electrified on 31 March 2021 and the second section also did get electrified soon after and so did the latter remaining third section.

== Trains passing through this line ==
- Sri Ganganagar–Tiruchirappalli Humsafar Express
- Kota–Shri Ganganagar Superfast Express
- Hazur Sahib Nanded–Shri Ganganagar Superfast Express via Hanumangarh
- Firozpur Cantonment–Hanumangarh Express
- Amrapur Aravali Express
- Shri Ganganagar-Tilak Bridge Express
- Shri Ganganagar-Jaipur Express via Loharu
- Bathinda-Jaipur Fast Passenger via Loharu
- Shri Ganganagar-Sadulpur Passenger
- Firozpur Cantonment-Rameshwaram Humsafar Express
