= Mithri, Sirsa =

Village in Haryana

- village
- Country: India
- State: Haryana
- District: Sirsa

Languages
  - Official: Hindi
- Time zone: UTC+5:30 (IST)
- Postal code: 125104
- ISO 3166 code: IN-HR
- Vehicle registration: HR-24
- Website: haryana.gov.in

Mithri is a village in the Sirsa district in the Haryana State of India. It is 43.2 km away from Sirsa and 14.5 km from dabwali. The size of the area is about 19.93 square kilometers, with a total number of households of 424.

== Demography ==
As of 2011 India census, Mithri had a population of 2313. Males (1208) constitute 52.22% of the population and females (1105) 47.77%. In Mithri village, the population of children with age 0-6 is 256, which makes up 11.07% of the total population of the village. The Average Sex Ratio of Mithri village is 915, which is higher than the Haryana state average of 879. The child Sex Ratio for the Mithri as per census is 1000, higher than the Haryana average of 834.

== Literacy ==
It has a lower literacy rate compared to Haryana. In 2011, the literacy rate of the village was 60.14%, compared to 75.55% in Haryana. In Mithri Male literacy stands at 65.93%, while the female literacy rate is 53.74%.
