= Rania, Sirsa =

Rania
- Town
- Location in Haryana, India Rania (India)
- Coordinates: 29.53°N 74.83°E
- Country: India
- State: Haryana
- District: Sirsa
- Elevation: 190 m (620 ft)

Population (2011)
  - Total: 25,123

Languages
  - Official: Hindi, English
  - Regional language: Bagri, Punjabi
- Time zone: UTC+5:30 (IST)
- PIN: 125076
- Telephone code: 01698
- ISO 3166 code: IN-HR
- Vehicle registration: HR-44
- Lok Sabha constituency: Sirsa
- Website: haryana.gov.in

Rania is a city and a municipal committee in Sirsa district located on the upper bank of Ghaggar River in the Indian state of Haryana. Rania Town is a grain market in Sirsa district. Nearby cities to Rania include Sirsa and Ellenabad. It shares its RTO office with Ellenabad which is also has its headquarters in Ellenabad. Earlier it was a part of Ellenabad subdivision but later carved out separately as a subdivision in Sirsa district of Haryana. It is at a distance of 22 km each from Sirsa and Ellenabad in opposite direction on Haryana State Highway 32A i.e. Bhambhoor-Jiwan Nagar Road which connects to Haryana State Highway 32 (Ellenabad-Dabwali Road) in Jiwan Nagar on one end and Haryana State Highway 23 (Sirsa-Ellenabad Road) in Bhambhoor on the other end.

== History ==
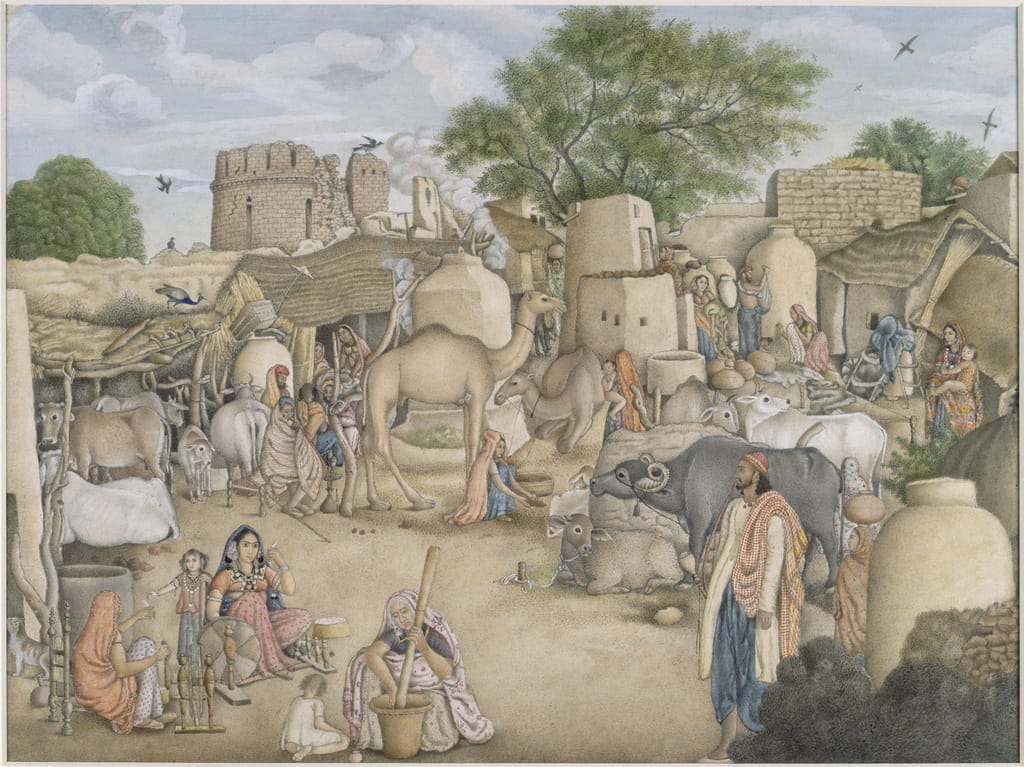
Painting of a street scene in the village of Rania (located in modern-day Haryana), circa 1816. Painted by the company artists Ghulam ‘Ali Khan and others.

After Nader Shah achieved victory against India, he subsequently withdrew in 1747 CE. Rania was taken over by the Bhatti Ranghar Rajput freebooter Muhammad Hassan Khan took the possession of Rania, Fatehabad and Rania, and he remained in ongoing tussle with Jat Sikh ruler of Patiala and Jind States for the control of this tract. In 1768 CE Johiya chieftain Kamruddin took over Rania, Fatehabad and Sirsa. In 1774 CE, Jat Sikh ruler of Patiala State, Amar Singh, snatched the paraganas of Rania, Fatehabad and Rania from Bhatti Ranghar Rajput chieftain Muhammad Amir Khan who withdrew to his Bhatner fort (Hanumangarh). In 1774 CE, Mughal forces under Mirza Najaf Khan and Raja Jai Singh signed a treaty with Jat Sikhs and Bikaner state under which Tosham, Hisar, Hansi, Meham and Rohtak were restored to Mughals and Raja Jai Singh became Nazim of Hisar sirkar; Rania-Fathebad-Sirsa tract was restorrd to Bhatti chiefs under Bikaner state; and Jat Sikhs kept the rest of their territory annexed by them in North Haryana (Narwana, Jind and Kaithal). After the death of Najaf Ali Khan, the weak Mughal Empire under Shah Alam II invited Maratha Empire's who took over the whole of Haryana by 1792 CE under Mahadaji Sindhia. George Thomas who held this area under Marathas, became independent ruler of this tract in 1798 Ce, but in 1801 Maratha Confederacy ruled by Daulat Rao Sindhia, led by their French-origin general Pierre Cuillier-Perron who allied with Jat Sikhs ruler of Jind, expelled George Thomas from Haryana. Ongoing feud among Bhattis, Johiyas, Jats, Skihs, Marathas and Mughals, weakened them all and this tract came under British Raj] in 1803. A baoli built in early 1st century in the mixed style of Turkish hammam and Indian well was buried during 1975-77 emergency to build a market.

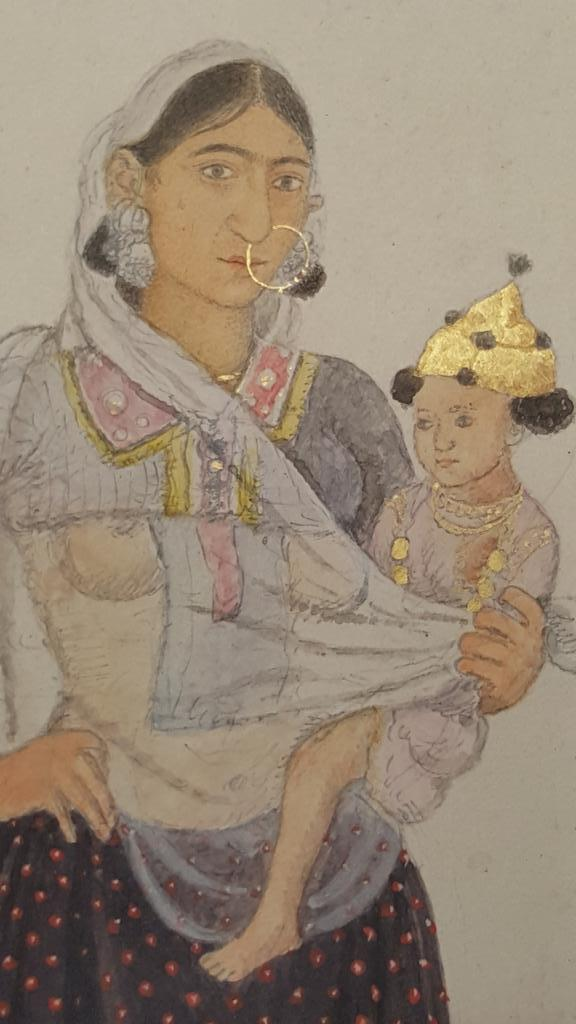
Painting of Amiban, the Haryanvi liaison of William Fraser, Company School, circa early 19th century

During British Raj, "the village of Rania was home to Amiban, main mistress to William Fraser, a brother of James Baillie Fraser, and his two Anglo-Indian sons and daughter."

During the first war of independence in 1857, Raja Nahar Singh the Jat ruler of Ballabhgarh, Rao Tula Ram ruler of Rewari and Nawab Noor Samad Khan of Rania all played key role.

There were significant number Muslims who left during India-Pakistan partition in 1947. There are many old buildings in the town including mosques and a fort which is still in use as the police station.

Rania town was a part of the old Punjab Region and became part of Haryana in 1966.

== Geography ==
Rania is situated in the far west of Haryana on the Bhambhoor-Jeewan Nagar Road. The nearest airports are in Delhi and Chandigarh, both around 270 kilometres (170 mi) away while the nearest railway stations are at Ellenabad and Sirsa. Sirsa city is approximately 23 kilometres (14 mi) to the east. Other nearby cities are Ellenabad (22 kilometres (14 mi)), Mandi Dabwali (60 kilometres (37 mi)) and Mandi Kalanwali (40 kilometres (25 mi)). The borders of Punjab are around 35 kilometres (22 mi) away and those of Rajasthan 25 kilometres (16 mi) distant. Some other villages and places near to the town are Jiwan Nagar, Kariwala, SantNagar (Jagmalera), Balasar Farm, Sultan Puria and the Ottu Dam, Tetarwal Farm House, Mohamad Puria.

== Demographics ==
As of 2011 Indian Census, Rania had a total population of 25,123, of which 13,281 were males and 11,842 were females. Population within the age group of 0 to 6 years was 3,361. The total number of literates in Rania was 15,299, which constituted 60.9% of the population with male literacy of 66.2% and female literacy of 54.9%. The effective literacy rate of 7+ population of Rania was 70.3%, of which male literacy rate was 77.1% and female literacy rate was 62.8%. The Scheduled Castes population was 6,474. Rania had 4874 households in 2011.

=== Languages ===
Hindi is the official language with Punjabi and English as additional official. Bagri and Punjabi are the most spoken languages of Rania.

== Economy ==
Rania has a population of about 25,000 and a municipality system that runs the town, which is divided into 15 wards. As of 2009, Rania became a separate Vidhan Sabha assembly constituency [044] of Sirsa earlier a part of Ellenabad Vidhan Sabha Constituency. The town has its own shopping areas, tehsil, police station, hospital, private nursing homes along with government and private schools. A privately run bus system connects with nearby towns and villages.

The main employment is in agriculture and retail. Wheat, vegetables, rice, and cotton are the main crops in the region.
