= Hanumangarh Town railway station =

Railway Station in Rajasthan, India

Hanumangarh Town

General information
- Location: Nai Mandi Road, Hanumangarh, Rajasthan; India
- Coordinates: 29.5744°N 74.3314°E
- Elevation: 183 metres (600 ft)
- System: Indian Railways station
- Owner: Indian Railways
- Operator: Bikaner railway division
- Line: Shri Ganganagar–Sadulpur line
- Platforms: 2
- Tracks: 4
- Connections: Auto stand

Construction
- Structure type: Standard (on-ground station)
- Parking: No
- Cycle facilities: No

Other information
- Status: Functioning
- Station code: HMO
- Fare zone: North Western Railway
Location

Hanumangarh Town railway station is a small railway station in Hanumangarh district, [Rajasthan]. Its code is HMO. It serves Hanumangarh city. The station consists of two platforms. The platforms are not well sheltered. It lacks many facilities including water and sanitation. Hanumangarh Town is one of two railway stations in the city of Hanumangarh.
