= Ellenabad railway station =

Railway station in Sirsa district, Haryana, India

Ellenabad

General information
- Location: Ellenabad, Sirsa district, Haryana; India
- Coordinates: 29.443962°N 74.657739°E
- Elevation: 194 metres (636 ft)
- System: Indian Railways station
- Owner: Indian Railways
- Operator: North Western Railway
- Line: Shri Ganganagar–Sadulpur line
- Platforms: 3
- Tracks: 4
- Connections: Provides Direct Bus Connectivity to Haryana such as Sirsa, Hisar, Dabwali, Chandigarh and Delhi

Construction
- Structure type: Standard (on ground station)
- Parking: Yes
- Cycle facilities: Yes
- Accessible: Yes
- Architectural style: Rajasthan Marwari sandstone

Other information
- Status: Single electric line
- Station code: ENB
- Zone(s): North Western Railway
- Division(s): Bikaner
- Fare zone: NWR
- Classification: NSG-5

History
- Opened: 15 September 1927
- Closed: October 2012 for BG conversion
- Rebuilt: 2012-2016
Location
- Location within India Location within Haryana

Ellenabad Railway Station is a railway station in Sirsa district, Haryana. Its code is ENB. It serves Ellenabad town. The station consists of 3 platforms. Passenger, Express trains halt here.
