= Mandi Dabwali =

- Town
- Location in Haryana, India Mandi Dabwali (India)
- Coordinates: 29.947656°N 74.732234°E
- Country: India
- State: Haryana
- District: Sirsa

Population (2011)
  - Total: 62,207
  - Rank: 2nd in Sirsa district

Languages
  - Official: Hindi
  - Additional official: English, Punjabi
  - Regional: Punjabi
- Time zone: UTC5:30 (IST)
- PIN: 125104
- Vehicle registration: HR-25

Mandi Dabwali is a town and municipal council and a police district in Sirsa district in the Indian state of Haryana. It is located on the border of Haryana and Punjab. It is 60 km from Sirsa city and 40 km from Bathinda, Punjab. Pin code of Mandi Dabwali is 125104 and STD code is 01668. Nearby cities and towns include Bathinda, Malout, Kalanwali, Sirsa, Sangaria, Abohar, Rania, Hanumangarh and Ellenabad.

In the 2011 Census of India, Mandi Dabwali had a population of 62,207. Males constituted 53% of the population and females 47%.

Dabwali fire accident occurred on 23 December 1995 in which at about 442 people mostly school children died and another 160 were injured, half of them with serious burns. This tragic accident happened in Rajeev Marriage Palace during a function organized by a local DAV Public School. There is a library founded in the memory of those who died at the site.

The town has been a hub for manufacturing and marketing modified open Jeeps since early 2000s.

Mandi Dabwali comes under Tehsil Dabwali, which is also an assembly constituency (043).

Mandi Dabwali has a railway station which connects it to Bathinda (Punjab) and to Hanumangarh (Rajasthan). It is the only station of Indian State Haryana on Jodhpur-Bathinda Railway Line of Northern Western Railway.

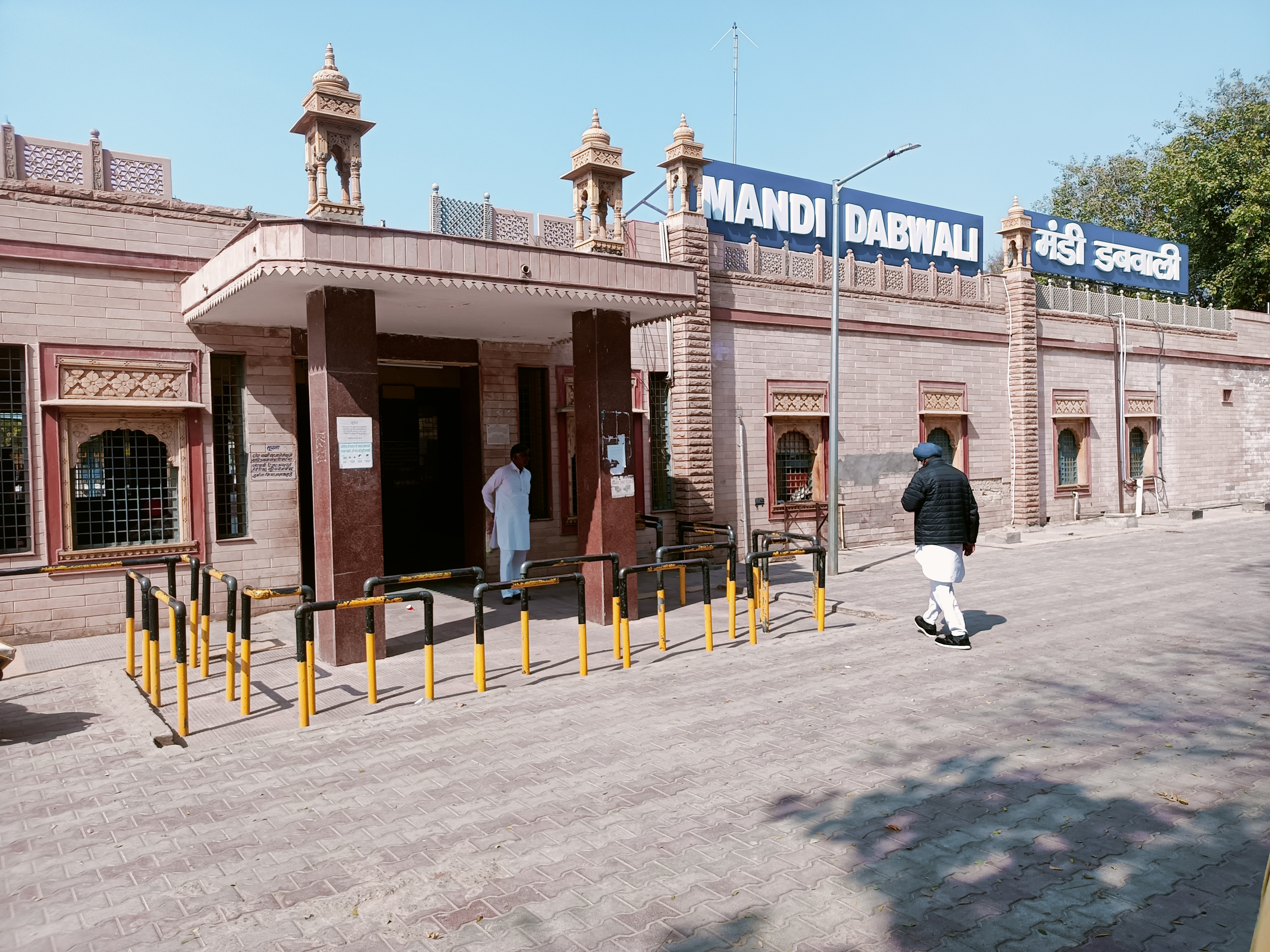
Railway of station Mandi Dabwali

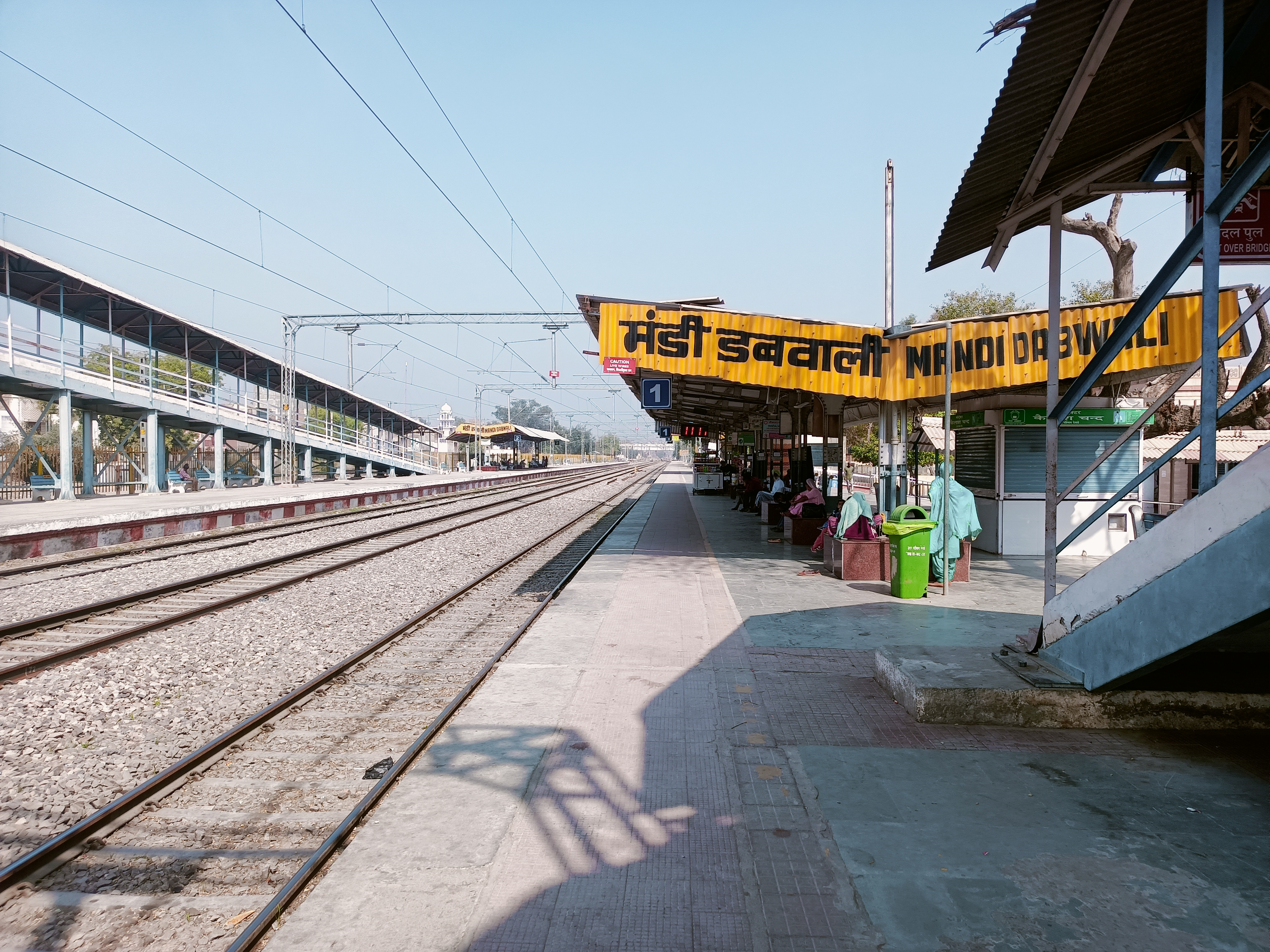
Railway station of Mandi Dabwali

The town has public facilities such as the indoor stadium named for Guru Gobind Singh and a college named for Dr. B.R. Ambedkar Government College affiliated to Chaudhary Devi Lal University Sirsa.

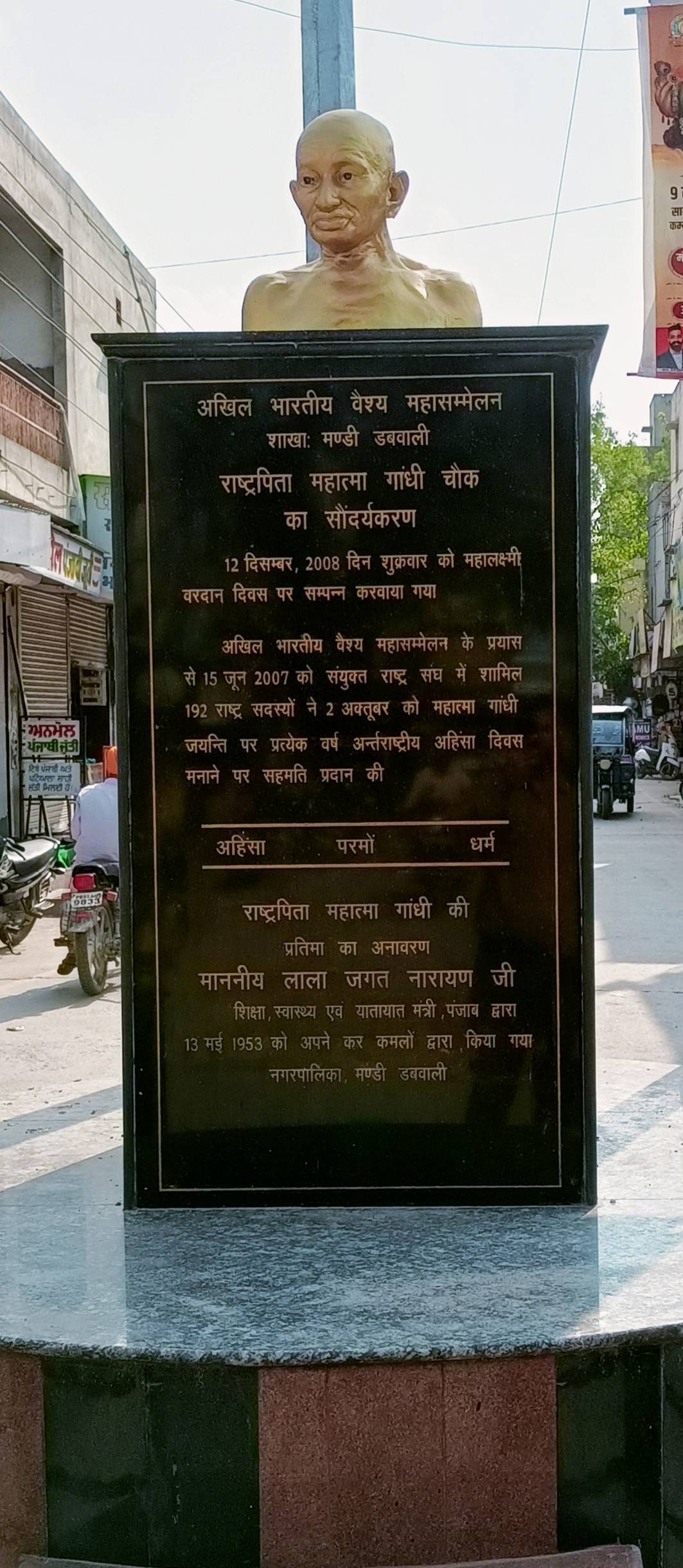
Statue of Gandhi at Gandhi Chowk, Mandi Dabwali

== Notable people ==
- Om Prakash Chautala, former chief minister of Haryana
- Sunil Grover, comedian and actor
- Devi Lal, former deputy prime minister of India

== See also ==
- Panniwala Ruldu
