= Ellenabad =

Ellenabad Kharial
- City
- Ellenabad
- Location in Haryana, India
- Coordinates: 29.45°N 74.65°E
- Country: India
- State: Haryana
- District: Sirsa
- First Settled: 1920s
- Founder: Robert Hutch
- Named for: Ellena

Government
  - Type: Municipality
  - Body: Municipal committee of Ellenabad

Area
  - Total: 4.88 km^{2} (1.88 sq mi)
- Elevation: 189 m (620 ft)

Population (2011)
  - Total: 52,285
  - Rank: 3rd in Sirsa district
  - Density: 10,700/km^{2} (27,700/sq mi)
- Demonym: Haryanvi

Languages
  - Official: Hindi
  - Additional official: English, Punjabi
  - Regional: Bagri, Haryanvi
- Time zone: UTC+5:30 (IST)
- PIN: 125102
- Telephone code: 01698
- ISO 3166 code: IN-HR
- Vehicle registration: HR 44
- Sex ratio: 1000/884 ♂/♀
- Literacy: 76.19

Ellenabad, previously known as Kharial, is a city with a municipal committee, near Sirsa City in the Sirsa district of the state of Haryana, India. It is located on the south bank of the Ghaggar River in the heart of the Bagar tract areas of Punjab, Haryana and Rajasthan and serves as a port of entry into the state of Haryana from the Rajasthan side. It has a strategic location as not only is it located near the Rajasthan border in Haryana but the Punjab border is also near to it. Because of this, the city has a kind off cosmopolitan culture of Punjabis, particularly Malwayi culture, Rajasthani Marwadi culture, Deshwali Haryanvi culture and native Bagri culture and traditions or a mix of all of them or some of them. The city of Ellenabad is divided into 17 wards with elections held every five years. As of 2011, the city had a population of 52,285, divided between two governing bodies: the Ellenabad Municipal Committee with 44,452 persons and the Ellenabad Rural Gram panchayat with 7,833. As of 2022, the city is estimated to have a population exceeding 60,000. There has been a rising demand to merge both administrative bodies and upgrade it to the Municipal Council level. Ellenabad Municipal Committee has total administration over 8,387 houses to which it supplies basic amenities like water and sewerage. It is also authorized to build roads within Municipal Committee limits and impose taxes on properties under its jurisdiction.

It is a constituency of Haryana Vidhan Sabha. The current Member of the Legislative Assembly is Bharat Singh Beniwal of Indian National Congress.

Ellenabad is the headquarters of Ellenabad tehsil, block, RTO and sub-divisions in Sirsa district and holds a seat for tehsildar, BDO, TC and SDM respectively. Big villages like Talwara with 9,000 people, Mallekan with 7,000 people and Jiwan nagar with 16,000 people come under jurisdiction of at least one of the mentioned governing bodies. Their population is a nearest thousandth estimation of the 2011 census.

== Etymology ==
Ellenabad was founded by Robert Hutch, the Commissioner of Hisar during the British Raj, whose wife gave birth to a child in the area. The story is that his wife Ellena was very fond of hunting and because the land around Kharial was very grassy with many kinds of animals, Ellena always went there for hunting. Once she went with her companions while she was pregnant and while hunting she went into delivery so her companions took her to Kharial. The people there took care of her like their own relatives and she recovered to full health. When she went back to Hisar, she asked her husband to do something for Kharial's people so Robert Hutch founded a town on the south bank of the Ghaghar river and named it Ellenabad after his wife.

== Transport ==
Ellenabad is connected by railways on the Sriganganagar-Sadulpur railway line. It is 43 kilometres (27 mi) from Hanumangarh and 136 kilometres (85 mi) from Sadulpur. It is planned to be connected to Sirsa and Sardarshahar by train. Ellenabad is situated on State Highway 23 and is 42 kilometres (26 mi) from Sirsa, the district headquarters. Haryana Roadways is the main transport for travelling. Also, there are daily night bus services for Chandigarh, Delhi, Jaipur and Haridwar. Ellenabad also administrates small villages like Kashi ram ka Bass, Mithanpura, Kishanpura, Karamshana, Dhani Sheran under its greater extended urban region.

== Demographics ==
The Ellenabad Municipal Committee has a population of 44,452 of which 23,559 are males while 20,893 are females as per a report released by Census India 2011. The population of Children in the range of 0 to 6 years is 5,437, which is 12.23% of the total population of Ellenabad (MC). In Ellenabad Municipal Committee, the female sex ratio is 884 against the state average of 879. Moreover, the child sex ratio in Ellenabad is around 862 compared to the Haryana state average of 834. The literacy rate of Ellenabad city is 76.19%; higher than the state and national average of 75.55% and 74.04% respectively. In Ellenabad, male literacy is 82.08% while the female literacy is 69.75%. The next census evaluation by the Ellenbad Municipal Committee was set to take place in 2021 but got delayed due to Covid and most probably its cancelled as of now and latest census will take place in 2031.

Ellenabad has a majority Hindu population, with a significant minority of Sikhs and small Muslim and Christian communities.

=== Ellenabad Religion Data 2011 ===
Town	Population	Hindu	Muslim	Christian	Sikh	Buddhist	Jain	Others	Not Stated
Ellenabad	36,623	84.06%	1.88%	0.29%	13.66%	0.01%	0.05%	0.02%	0.03%

== Economy ==
Ellenabad's primary source of income is agriculture. Its grain market provides support to farmers from surrounding villages and daily trains connect Ellenabad to Mumbai, Gurgaon, Firozpur, Jaipur, Bathinda, Ajmer, New Delhi, Sri Ganganagar, Abu Road, Ahmedabad, Surat, Sikar, Hanumangarh, Churu, and Jhunjhunu.

== Education ==
There are two government schools for higher secondary education in the city, but no government graduate college. A significant number of students also do daily updown in buses and trains for colleges in Sirsa, Sri Ganganagar, Hisar, and Bhatinda.

Education up to twelfth grade serves students also from nearby villages and towns from Haryana and Rajasthan like Talwara, Tibi, Mallekan, Rania, Nohar, Chaiya, Rawatsar, Chahuwali, Thalarka, and Masita. They travel daily for their school studies notably in private institutions for better English medium education.

Nachiketan Public School, Sarvodaya School Ellenabad, Satluj Public School, Nachiketan Model school and C.R.D.A.V. Public School are the other education institutes. Other notable schools in the city are Sir Chhotu Ram Jat Senior Secondary School, Nivedita Senior Secondary School, Sarvpalli Public School, Ch. Harpal Singh Convent School (H.C.S.), D.A.V. Public School, Navjyoti Senior Secondary School, R.R. Memorial School, and Saraswati High School.

== Health care ==
Nearby hospitals include the Civil Hospital, Janta Hospital, Gupta nursing and maternity home, Jain Hospital, Shri Nursing Home, CMC Hospital, Bansal Hospital, Pareek Hospital, Singla Hospital, Shubham Hospital, Tiwari clinic, Kahlon Child Clinic, Chaudhary Eye Hospital, City Eye hospital and many others.
