= Hanumangarh Junction railway station =

Railway Station in Rajasthan, India

Hanumangarh Junction

General information
- Location: Station Road, Hanumangarh, Rajasthan; India
- Coordinates: 29.6117°N 74.2936°E
- Elevation: 184 metres (604 ft)
- System: Indian Railways station
- Owner: Indian Railways
- Operator: Bikaner railway division
- Lines: Jodhpur-Bathinda line, Shri Ganganagar–Sadulpur line
- Platforms: 3
- Tracks: 8
- Connections: Auto stand

Construction
- Structure type: Standard (on-ground station)
- Parking: Yes
- Cycle facilities: Yes

Other information
- Status: Functioning
- Station code: HMH
- Fare zone: North Western Railway
Location

Hanumangarh Junction railway station is a main railway station in Hanumangarh district, Rajasthan. Its code is HMH. It serves Hanumangarh city.

Hanumangarh is a major railway station on Jodhpur–Bathinda line, Sadulpur, Rewari, Jaipur, Sriganganagar, Anupgarh.

== Background ==
Both metre-gauge and broad-gauge lines earlier passed through this station. There is a diamond railway crossing. The broad gauge started in 1982 from Bhatinda to Suratgarh via Hanumangarh and first train was flagged by Milkha Singh.

== Development ==
The metre-gauge train has become history for Hanumangarh because in October 2012 Hanumangarh–Sadulpur metre-gauge track closed and is being converted into broad gauge. Hanumangarh to Sri Ganganagar railway track has been converted into broad gauge and presently three trains are running on this track from Hanumangarh to Sri Ganganagar.

== Services ==
A number of trains connect to this major railway junction.

Recently in August, 2025 Hanumangarh Junction got extended new train number 14707/14708 Ranakpur Express. It got extended from Lalgarh Junction.
