= Ghaggar-Hakra River =

Intermittent river in India and Pakistan

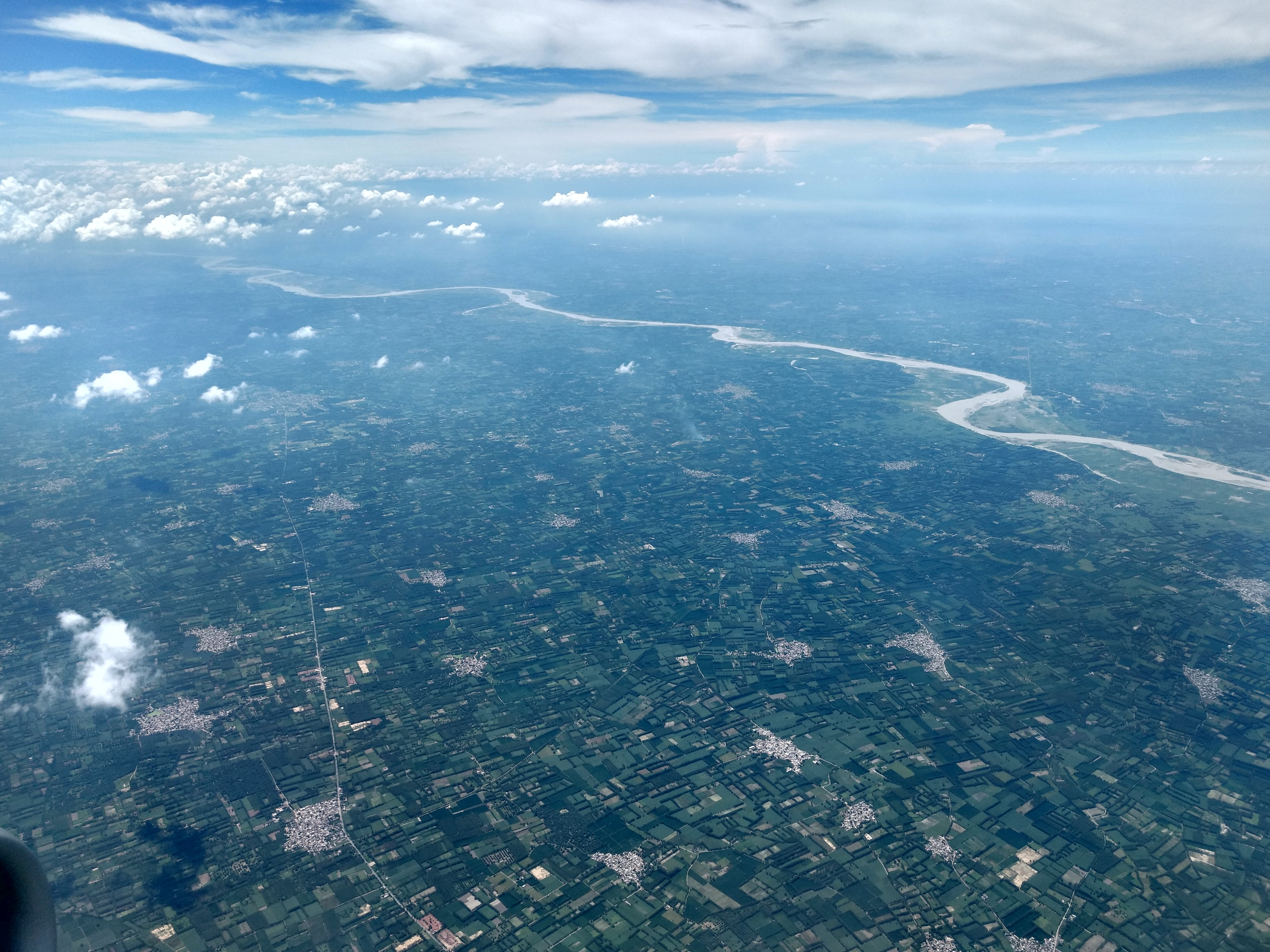
- Aerial view of Ghaggar river near Chandigarh

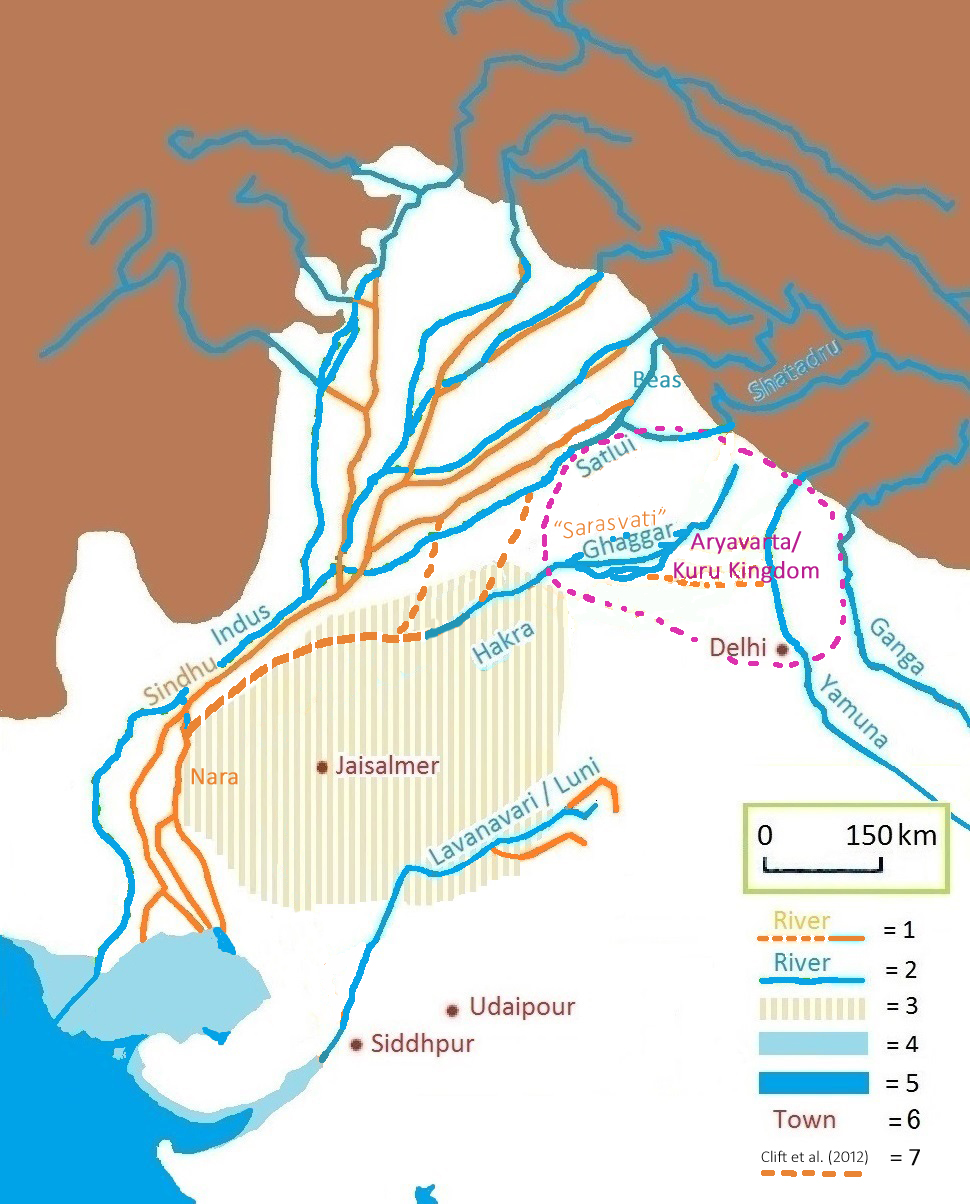
- Present-day Ghaggar-Hakra river-course, with (pre-)Harappan paleochannel as proposed by Clift et al. (2012). 1 = ancient river 2 = today's river 3 = today's Thar Desert; 4 = ancient shore 5 = today's shore 6 = today's town 7 = dried-up Hakra course, and pre-Harappan Sutlej paleochannels (Clift et al. (2012)) See also this satellite image.

Location
- Country: India, Pakistan

Physical characteristics
- Source
  - location: Shivalik Hills, Punjab, India
- Mouth
  - location: Ottu, Punjab, India
  - coordinates: 29°17′23″N 74°08′11″E
- Discharge

Basin features
- Tributaries
  - left: Kaushalya river
  - right: Markanda river, Sarswati river, Tangri river, Chautang
- Waterbodies: Kaushalya Dam, Ottu barrage

The Ghaggar-Hakra River (IPA: [ɡʰəɡːəɾ ɦəkɾaː]) is an intermittent river in India and Pakistan that flows in force only during the monsoon season. The river is known as Ghaggar before the Ottu barrage (Note: at 29.4875°N 74.8925°E), and as Hakra downstream of the barrage in the Thar Desert. In pre-Harappan times the Ghaggar was a tributary of the Sutlej. It is still connected to this paleochannel of the Sutlej, and possibly the Yamuna, which ended in the Nara River, presently a delta channel of the Indus River joining the sea via Sir Creek.

The Sutlej changed its course about 8,000–10,000 years ago, leaving the Ghaggar-Hakra as a system of monsoon-fed rivers terminating in the Thar Desert. The Indus Valley Civilisation prospered when the monsoons that fed the rivers diminished around 5,000 years ago, and a large number of sites from the Mature Indus Valley Civilisation (2600–1900 BCE) are found along the middle course of the (dried-up) Hakra in Pakistan. (Note: In a survey conducted by M.R. Mughal between 1974 and 1977, as cited in Gupta (1995), over 400 sites were mapped along 300 miles of the Hakra river. According to Bryant (2001), the majority of these sites were dated to the fourth or third millennium BCE. S.P. Gupta, in Gupta (1995, p. 183), Gupta (1999), counts over 600 sites of the Indus civilization on the Ghaggar–Hakra river and its tributaries. V.N. Misra, as cited in Gupta (1999, p. 144), states that over 530 Harappan sites (of the more than 800 known sites, not including Late Harappan or OCP) are located on the Ghaggar-Hakra. According to Misra (1992), only 90–96 Indus Valley sites have been discovered on the Indus and its tributaries; about 36 sites on the Indus river itself. The other sites are mainly in Kutch-Saurashtra (nearly 200 sites), Yamuna Valley (nearly 70 late Harappan sites) and in the Indus Valley, in Baluchistan, and in the NW Frontier Province (less than 100 sites). Sindhav (2016, p. 103) notes that these claims of a large number of Ghaggar-Hakra sites are politically motivated and exaggerated. While the Indus remained an active river, the Ghaggar-Hakra dried-up, leaving many sites undisturbed. Sidhav further notes that the Ghaggar-Hakra was a tributary of the Indus, so the proposed Sarasvati nomenclature is redundant.) Around 4,000 years ago, the Indus Valley Civilisation declined when the monsoons further diminished, and the Ghaggar-Hakra dried up, becoming a small seasonal river. (Note: Giosan et al. (2012): Giosan et al. (2012, p. 1688): "Contrary to earlier assumptions that a large glacier-fed Himalayan river, identified by some with the mythical Sarasvati, watered the Harappan heartland on the interfluve between the Indus and Ganges basins, we show that only monsoonal-fed rivers were active there during the Holocene."; Giosan et al. (2012, p. 1689): "Numerous speculations have advanced the idea that the Ghaggar-Hakra fluvial system, at times identified with the lost mythical river of Sarasvati (e.g., 4, 5, 7, 19), was a large glacier-fed Himalayan river. Potential sources for this river include the Yamuna River, the Sutlej River, or both rivers. However, the lack of large-scale incision on the interfluve demonstrates that large, glacier-fed rivers did not flow across the Ghaggar-Hakra region during the Holocene."; "Numerous speculations have advanced the idea that the Ghaggar-Hakra fluvial system, at times identified with the lost mythical river of Sarasvati (e.g., 4, 5, 7, 19), was a large glacier fed Himalayan river. Potential sources for this river include the Yamuna River, the Sutlej River, or both rivers. However, the lack of large-scale incision on the interfluve demonstrates that large, glacier-fed rivers did not flow across the Ghaggar-Hakra region during the Holocene.; The present Ghaggar-Hakra valley and its tributary rivers are currently dry or have seasonal flows. Yet rivers were undoubtedly active in this region during the Urban Harappan Phase. We recovered sandy fluvial deposits approximately 5;400 y old at Fort Abbas in Pakistan (SI Text), and recent work (33) on the upper Ghaggar-Hakra interfluve in India also documented Holocene channel sands that are approximately 4;300 y old. On the upper interfluve, fine-grained floodplain deposition continued until the end of the Late Harappan Phase, as recent as 2,900 y ago (33) (Fig. 2B). This widespread fluvial redistribution of sediment suggests that reliable monsoon rains were able to sustain perennial rivers earlier during the Holocene and explains why Harappan settlements flourished along the entire Ghaggar-Hakra system without access to a glacier-fed river."; Valdiya (2013) dispute this, arguing that it was a large perennial river draining the high mountains as late as 3700–2500 years ago. Giosan et al. (2013) have responded to, and rejected Valdiya's arguments.)

19th and early 20th century scholars, but also some more recent authors, have suggested that the Ghaggar-Hakra might be the defunct remains of the Sarasvati River mentioned in the Rig Veda, fed by Himalayan rivers, despite the fact that the Ghaggar-Hakra had dried up by that time.

== River course ==
Interactive Map

The basin consists of two parts, Khadir and Bangar. Bangar are the higher banks that are not flooded in rainy season, while khadar refers to the lower flood-prone area. (Note: HaryanaOnline – Geography of Haryana)

=== Ghaggar River ===
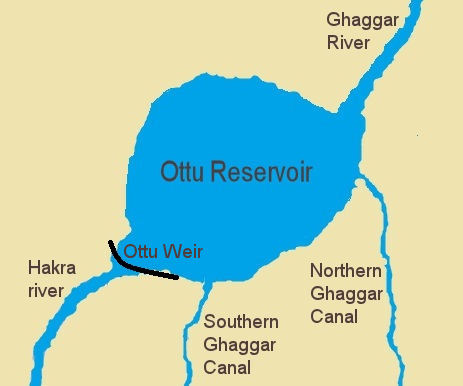
The Ghaggar river flows into the Ottu reservoir, afterwards it becomes the Hakra river

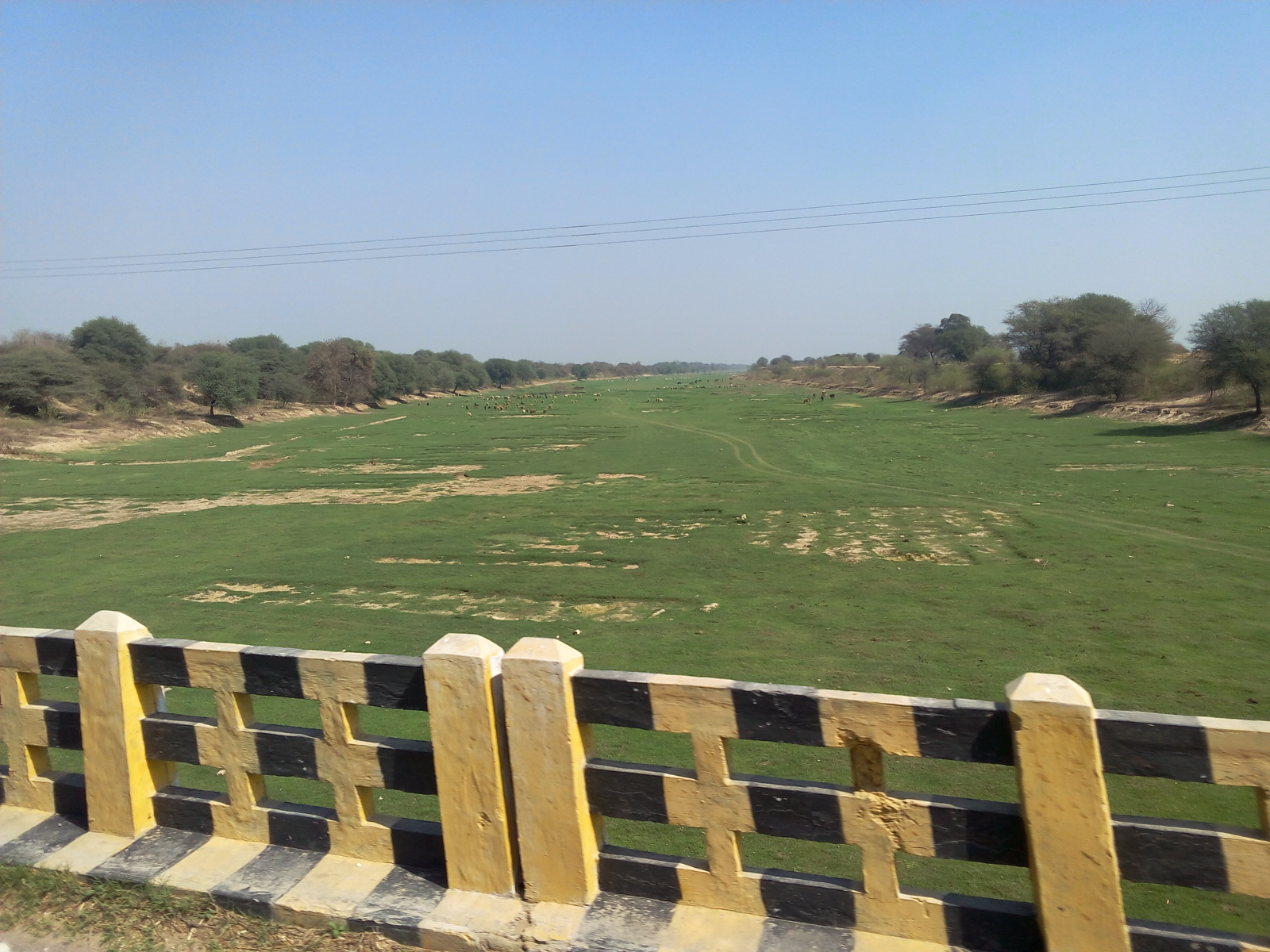
Ghaggar river's dry bed in February near Naurangdesar village, Hanumangarh district, Rajasthan, India

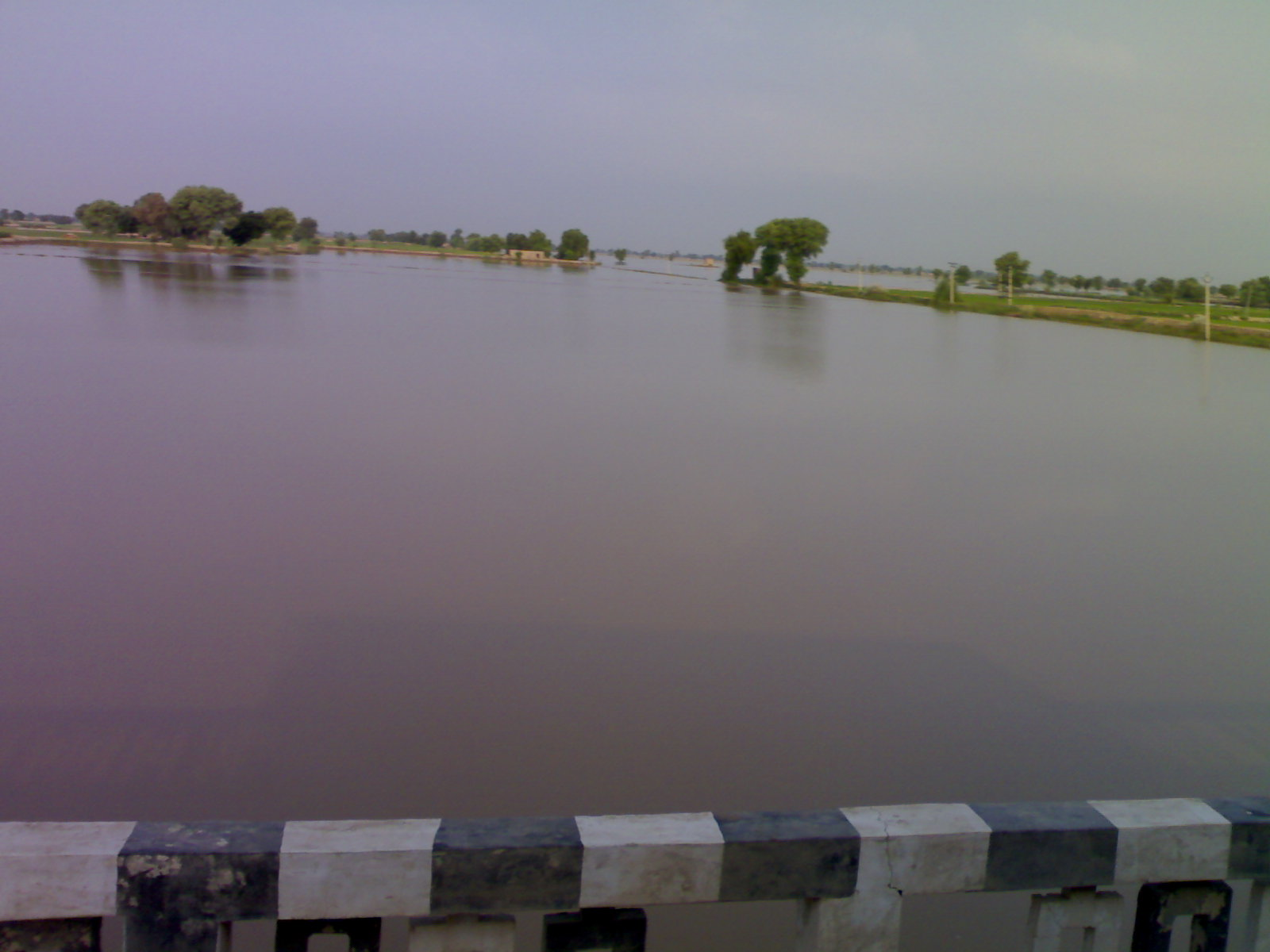
Ghaggar river, near Anoopgarh, Rajasthan in the month of September

The Ghaggar is an intermittent river in India, flowing during the monsoon rains. It originates in the village of Dagshai in the Shivalik Hills of Himachal Pradesh at an elevation of 1,927 metres (6,322 ft) above mean sea level and flows through Punjab and Haryana states into Rajasthan; just southwest of Sirsa, Haryana and by the side of Talwara Lake in Rajasthan.

Dammed at Ottu barrage near Sirsa, Ghaggar feeds two irrigation canals that extend into Rajasthan.

==== Tributaries of the Ghaggar ====
The main tributaries of the Ghaggar are the Kaushalya river, Markanda, Sarsuti, Tangri and Chautang.

The Kaushalya river is a tributary of Ghaggar river on the left side of Ghaggar-Hakra. It flows in the Panchkula district of Haryana state of India and converges with Ghaggar river near Pinjore just downstream of Kaushalya Dam.

=== Hakra River ===
The Hakra is the dried-out channel of a river near Fort Abbas city in Pakistan that is the continuation of the Ghaggar River in India. The Hakra channel is connected to paleochannels of the Sutlej and the Yamuna, which ended in the Nara River, a delta channel of the Indus River joining the sea via Sir Creek. The Sutlej changed its course about 8,000-10,000 years ago, leaving the Ghaggar-Hakra as a system of monsoon-fed rivers terminating in the Thar Desert.

This Sutlej/Yamuna paleochannel streamed through Sindh, and its sign can be found in Sindh areas such as Khairpur, Nawabshah, Sanghar and Tharparkar.

A large number of sites from the Mature Indus Valley Civilisation (2600–1900 BCE) are found along the middle course of the (dried-up) Hakra in Pakistan. IVC-sites have not been found further south than the middle of Bahawalpur district, and it has been assumed that the Hakra ended there in a series of terminal lakes.

== Paleography ==
While there is general agreement that the river courses in the Indus Basin have frequently changed course, the exact sequence of these changes and their dating have been problematic.

Older publications have suggested that the Sutlej and the Yamuna drained into the Hakra well into Mature Harappan times, providing ample volume to the supply provided by the monsoon-fed Ghaggar. The Sutlej and Yamuna then changed course between 2500 BCE and 1900 BCE, due to either tectonic events or "slightly altered gradients on the extremely flat plains," resulting in the drying-up of the Hakra in the Thar Desert. More recent publications have shown that the Sutlej and the Yamuna shifted course well before Harappan times, leaving the monsoon-fed Ghaggar-Hakra which dried-up during late Harappan times.

=== Pre-Holocene ===
The paleo-channel of the Sutlej was active until the end of the Ice Age, some 10,000–8,000 years ago, emptying into the Rann of Kutch via the Nara river.

Clift et al. (2012), using dating of zircon sand grains, have shown that subsurface river channels near the Indus Valley Civilisation sites in Cholistan immediately below the dry Ghaggar-Hakra bed show sediment affinity with the Beas River in the western sites and the Sutlej and the Yamuna in the eastern ones, suggesting that the Yamuna itself, or a channel of the Yamuna, along with a channel of the Sutlej may have flowed west some time between 47,000 BCE and 10,000 BCE, well before the beginnings of Indus Civilization.

Analysis of sand grains using optically stimulated luminescence by Ajit Singh and others in 2017 indicated that the suggested paleochannel of the Ghaggar-Hakra is actually a former course of the Sutlej, which diverted to its present course before the development of the Harappan Civilisation. The abandonment of this older course by the Sutlej started 15,000 years ago, and was complete by 8,000 years ago. Ajit Singh et al. conclude that the urban populations settled not along a perennial river, but a monsoon-fed seasonal river that was not subject to devastating floods.

Khonde et al. (2017) confirm that the Great Rann of Kutch received sediments from a different source than the Indus, but this source stopped supplying sediments after ca. 10,000 years ago. Likewise, Dave et al. (2019) state that "[o]ur results disprove the proposed link between ancient settlements and large rivers from the Himalayas and indicate that the major palaeo-fluvial system traversing through this region ceased long before the establishment of the Harappan civilisation."

=== Indus Valley Civilisation ===
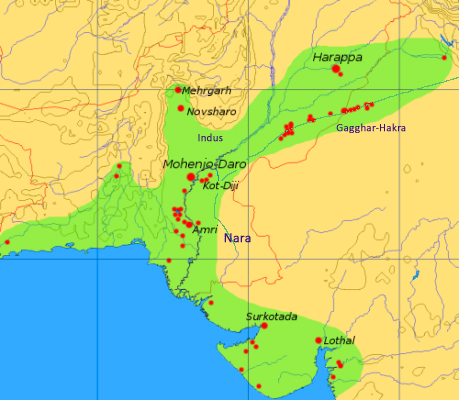
Outline of the Indus Civilization, with concentration of settlements along the Ghaggar-Hakra. See Sameer et al. (2018) for a more detailed map.

==== Mature IVC ====
During the IVC, the Ghaggar-Hakra fluvial system was not a large glacier-fed Himalayan river, but a monsoonal-fed river. (Note: According to Chatterjee et al. (2019) the Ghaggar-Hakra channel was perennial receiving sediments from Higher and Lesser Himalayas from 80–20K years ago and 9–4.5K years ago, and ceased to exist during the last Glacial Maximum. It was perennial after the last Ice Age due to reactivation from distributaries of the Sutlej, during the pre, early and middle Harappan period, from 7000BCE to 2500BCE. The river became seasonal after that and completely dried up by 1900 BCE. In response, Sinha et al. (2020) state that "most workers have documented the cessation of large scale fluvial activity in NW India in early Holocene, thereby refuting the sustenance of the Harappan Civilisation by a large river.") The Indus Valley Civilisation prospered when the monsoons that fed the rivers diminished around 5,000 years ago, and a large number of sites from the Mature Indus Valley Civilisation (2600-1900 BCE) are found along the middle course of the (dried-up) Hakra in Pakistan. Around 4,000 the Indus Valley Civilisation declined when the monsoons further diminished, and the Ghaggar-Hakra dried-up, becoming a small seasonal river.

According to archaeologist Rita Wright, the large number of documented sites may be due to the ephemeral nature of the settlements, with the inhabitants frequently moving around in pursuit of water. According to archaeologist Shereen Ratnagar, many Ghaggar-Hakra sites in India are actually those of local cultures; some sites display contact with Harappan civilisation, but only a few are fully developed Harappan ones. Hetalben Sidhav notes that claims of a large number of Ghaggar-Hakra sites are politically motivated and exaggerated. While the Indus remained an active river, the Ghaggar-Hakra dried up, leaving many sites undisturbed, which explains why such a large number of sites has been found.

==== Drying-up of the Hakra and decline of the IVC ====
Late in the 2nd millennium BCE the Ghaggar-Hakra fluvial system dried up, becoming the small seasonal river it is today, which affected the Harappan civilisation. (Note: Mughal (1997) concludes that during the Bronze Age the Ghaggar-Hakra sometimes carried more, sometimes less water. Mughal (1997) states that satellite photography has shown that the Ghaggar-Hakra was a large river that dried up several times, as corroborated by an isotope study by Tripathi et al. (2004) (Note: "Hakra". Totally Explained.) According to M. R. Mughal, the Hakra dried-up at the latest in 1900 BCE, but Tripathi et al. (2004) conclude that it took place much earlier. Henri-Paul Francfort, utilising images from the French satellite SPOT two decades ago, found that the large river Sarasvati is pre-Harappan altogether, and started drying up already in the middle of the 4th millennium BCE; during Harappan times only a complex irrigation-canal network was being used. The date should therefore be pushed back to c. 3800 BCE.) (Note: From Brooke (2015): “The story in Harappan India was somewhat different (see Figure 111.3). The Bronze Age village and urban societies of the Indus Valley are some-thing of an anomaly, in that archaeologists have found little indication of local defence and regional warfare. It would seem that the bountiful monsoon rainfall of the Early to Mid-Holocene had forged a condition of plenty for all, and that competitive energies were channelled into commerce rather than conflict. Scholars have long argued that these rains shaped the origins of the urban Harappan societies, which emerged from Neolithic villages around 2600 BC. It now appears that this rainfall began to slowly taper off in the third millennium, at just the point that the Harappan cities began to develop. Thus it seems that this "first urbanization" in South Asia was the initial response of the Indus Valley peoples to the beginning of Late Holocene aridification. These cities were maintained for 300 to 400 years and then gradually abandoned as the Harappan peoples resettled in scattered villages in the eastern range of their territories, into the Punjab and the Ganges Valley ... .” — Brooke (2015) (footnotes) (a) Giosan, Liviu; et al. (2012). "Fluvial landscapes of the Harappan Civilization". Proceedings of the National Academy of Sciences, USA. 102 (26): E1688–E1694. Bibcode:2012PNAS..109E1688G. doi:10.1073/pnas.1112743109. PMC 3387054. PMID 22645375; (b) Ponton, Camilo (2012). "Holocene aridification of India". Geophysical Research Letters. 39 (3): L03704. Bibcode:2012GeoRL..39.3704P. doi:10.1029/2011GL050722. hdl:1912/5100. S2CID 140604921; (c) Rashid, Harunur; et al. (2011). "Late glacial to Holocene Indian summer monsoon variability based upon sediment records taken from the Bay of Bengal" (PDF). Terrestrial, Atmospheric and Oceanic Sciences. 22 (2): 215–228. Bibcode:2011TAOS...22..215R. doi:10.3319/TAO.2010.09.17.02(TibXS); (d) Madella, Marco; Fuller, Dorian Q. (2006). "Palaeoecology and the Harappan civilisation of south Asia: A reconsideration". Quaternary Science Reviews. 25 (11–12): 1283–1301. Bibcode:2006QSRv...25.1283M. doi:10.1016/j.quascirev.2005.10.012. Compare with the very different interpretations in Possehl (2002), and Staubwasser et al. (2003), Bar-Matthews & Avner Ayalon (2015).) Paleobotanical information documents the aridity that developed after the drying up of the river. The diminishing of the monsoons particular affected the Ghaggar-Hakra system, which became ephemeral and was largely abandoned, with the IVC reorganizing in local settlements some 4000 years ago. In the late Harappan period the number of late Harappan sites in the middle Ghaggar-Hakra channel and in the Indus valley diminished, while it expanded in the upper Ghaggar-Sutlej channels and in Saurashtra. The IVC-people migrated east toward the more humid regions of the Indo-Gangetic Plain, where the decentralised late Harappan phase took place.

The same widespread aridification in the third millennium BCE also led to water shortages and ecological changes in the Eurasian steppes, (Note: Rajesh Kochhar (2017), "The Aryan chromosome", The Indian Express) leading to a change of vegetation, triggering "higher mobility and transition to nomadic cattle breeding". (Note: Demkina et al. (2017): "In the second millennium BC, humidification of the climate led to the divergence of the soil cover with secondary formation of the complexes of chestnut soils and solonetzes. This paleoecological crisis had a significant effect on the economy of the tribes in the Late Catacomb and Post-Catacomb time stipulating their higher mobility and transition to the nomadic cattle breeding.") (Note: See also Eurogenes Blogspot, The crisis) These migrations eventually resulted in the Indo-Aryan migrations into South Asia.

Most of the Harappan sites along the Ghaggar-Hakra are presently found in desert country, and have remained undisturbed since the end of the Indus Civilization. This contrasts with the heavy alluvium of the Indus and other large Panjab rivers that have obscured Harappan sites, including part of Mohenjo Daro. Painted Grey Ware sites (c. 1000–600 BCE) have been found at former IVC-sites at the middle and upper Ghaggar-Hakra channel, and have also been found in the bed and not on the banks of the Ghaggar-Hakra river, which suggests that river was certainly dried up by this period. The sparse distribution of the Painted Gray Ware sites in the Ghaggar river valley indicates that during this period the Ghaggar river had already dried up.

=== Archaeological explorations ===
Between 1940 and 1943, Aurel Stein undertook two expeditions along the Ghaggar-Hakra River to find physical evidence of the Saraswati River described in the Rig Veda. While he didn't definitively establish the region's chronological archaeological sequence, his work significantly advanced Indian archaeology. Surveying from Hanumangarh to Bahawalpur, he identified approximately 100 prehistoric and historical sites, conducting exploratory excavations at some. His observations on the geographical spread of these sites proved valuable to later researchers, including Amalananda Ghosh (3 March 1910 – 1981) and Katy Dalal. Notably, he documented sites such as Munda, Bhadrakali Temple, and Derwar.

== Identification with the Rigvedic Sarasvati River ==
Since the 19th century, proposals have been made to identify the mythological Sarasvati River with the Ghaggar-Hakra River. The Sarasvati is often mentioned in the Rig Veda, which describes it as a mighty river located between the Indus and the Ganges, while later Vedic texts describe it as disappearing in the desert. Arguments have been made that the Ghaggar-Hakra was such a mighty river, due to tributaries which were supposed to receive snow melt waters from the Himalayas. Yet, more recent research shows that the Ghaggar-Hakra was monsoon-fed during Harappan times, and had already dried-up during Vedic times.

=== Rig Veda ===
The Sarasvati River is mentioned in all books of the Rigveda except the fourth. It is the only river with hymns entirely dedicated to it: RV 6.61, RV 7.95 and RV 7.96. It is mentioned as a divine and large river, which flows "from the mountains to the samudra," which some take as the Indian Ocean. The Rig Veda was composed during the latter part of the late Harappan period, and according to Shaffer, the reason for the predominance of the Sarasvati in the Rig Veda is the late Harappan (1900–1300 BCE) population shift eastwards to Haryana.

The identification with the Sarasvati River is based on the mentions in Vedic texts, e.g. in the enumeration of the rivers in Rigveda 10.75.05; the order is Ganga, Yamuna, Sarasvati, Sutudri, Parusni. Later Vedic texts record the river as disappearing at Vinasana (literally, "the disappearing") or Upamajjana, and in post-Vedic texts as joining both the Yamuna and Ganges as an invisible river at Prayaga (Allahabad). Some claim that the sanctity of the modern Ganges is directly related to its assumption of the holy, life-giving waters of the ancient Saraswati River. The Mahabharata says that the Sarasvati River dried up in a desert (at a place named Vinasana or Adarsana).

=== Identification ===
Nineteenth and early 20th century scholars, such as orientalist Christian Lassen (1800–1876), philologist and Indologist Max Müller (1823–1900), archaeologist Aurel Stein (1862–1943), and geologist R. D. Oldham (1858–1936), had considered that the Ghaggar-Hakra might be the defunct remains of a river, the Sarasvati, invoked in the orally transmitted collection of ancient Sanskrit hymns, the Rig Veda composed c. 1500 BCE to 1200 BCE.

More recently, but writing before Giosan's 2012 publication and supposing a late Harappan diversion of the Sutlej and the Yamuna, several scholars have identified the old Ghaggar-Hakra River with the Vedic Sarasvati River and the Chautang with the Drishadvati River. (Note: Such scholars include Gregory Possehl, J. M. Kenoyer, Bridget and Raymond Allchin, Kenneth Kennedy, Franklin Southworth, and numerous Indian archaeologists.) Gregory Possehl and Jane McIntosh refer to the Ghaggar-Hakra River as "Sarasvati" throughout their respective 2002 and 2008 books on the Indus Civilisation, and Gregory Possehl states "Linguistic, archaeological, and historical data show that the Sarasvati of the Vedas is the modern Ghaggar or Hakra."

Because most of the Indus Valley sites known so far are actually located on the Ghaggar-Hakra river and its tributaries and not on the Indus river, some Indian archaeologists, such as S.P. Gupta, have proposed to use the term "Indus Sarasvati Civilization" to refer to the Harappan culture which is named, as is common in archaeology, after the first place where the culture was discovered.

=== Objections ===
Romila Thapar terms the identification "controversial" and dismisses it, noticing that the descriptions of Sarasvati flowing through the "high mountains" does not tally with Ghaggar's course and suggests that Sarasvati which also known as Haraxvati is Helmand river of Afghanistan. Wilke suggests that the identification is problematic since the Ghaggar-Hakra river was already dried up at the time of the composition of the Vedas, let alone the migration of the Vedic people into northern India.

The idea that the Ghaggar-Hakra was fed by Himalayan sources has also been contradicted by recent geophysical research, which shows that the Ghaggar-Hakra system, although having greater discharge in Harappan times which was enough to sustain human habitation, was not sourced by the glaciers and snows of the Himalayas, but rather by a system of perennial monsoon-fed rivers. In contrast to all Himalayan rivers in the region that dug out wide valleys in their own sediments as the monsoon declined, no such valley exists between the Sutlej and the Yamuna, demonstrating that neither the Ghaggar-Hakra nor any other Sarasvati candidate in that region had a Himalayan source.

Rajesh Kocchar further notes that, even if the Sutlej and the Yamuna had drained into the Ghaggar during Vedic period, it still would not fit the Rig Vedic descriptions because "the snow-fed Satluj and Yamuna would strengthen [only the] lower Ghaggar. [The] upper Ghaggar would still be as puny as it is today." According to Rajesh Kocchar, there are two Sarasvati rivers mentioned in the Rigveda. The older one described in the family books of the Rigveda, which he calls Naditama Sarasvati, drains into a samudra. The newer one described in the tenth book of Rigveda as well as later Vedic texts, which he calls Vinasana Sarasvati, disappears in the sands. The Vinasana Sarasvati has been "accepted by all" to be the same as the Ghaggar-Hakra river. The description of the Naditama Sarasvati in the Rigveda matches the physical features of the Helmand River in Afghanistan, more precisely its tributary the Harut River, whose older name was Harax^{v}atī in Avestan. Ganga and Yamuna, he takes to be small streams in its vicinity. When the Vedic people moved east into Punjab, they named the new rivers they encountered after the old rivers they knew from Helmand.

== See also ==
- Sutlej
- Ganges
- Indus

== Sources ==
Printed sources

- Allchin, Bridget; Allchin, Raymond (1982), The Rise of Civilization in India and Pakistan, Cambridge University Press, p. 160, ISBN 978-0-521-28550-6
- Anthony, David W. (2007), The Horse The Wheel And Language. How Bronze-Age Riders From the Eurasian Steppes Shaped The Modern World, Princeton University Press
- Bryant, Edwin (2001), The Quest for the Origins of Vedic Culture, Oxford University Press, ISBN 978-0-19-513777-4
- Chatterjee, Anirban; Ray, Jyotiranjan S.; Shukla, Anil D.; Pande, Kanchan (20 November 2019). "On the existence of a perennial river in the Harappan heartland". Scientific Reports. 9 (1): 17221. Bibcode:2019NatSR...917221C. doi:10.1038/s41598-019-53489-4. ISSN 2045-2322. PMC 6868222. PMID 31748611.
- Clift, Peter D.; Carter, Andrew; Giosan, Liviu; Durcan, Julie; et al. (2012), "U–Pb zircon dating evidence for a Pleistocene Sarasvati River and capture of the Yamuna River", Geology, 40 (3): 211–214, Bibcode:2012Geo....40..211C, doi:10.1130/g32840.1, S2CID 130765891
- Dave, Aditi Krishna; Courty, Marie-Agnes; Fitzsimmons, Kathryn E.; Singhvia, Ashok Kumar (2019), "Revisiting the contemporaneity of a mighty river and the Harappans: Archaeological, stratigraphic and chronometric constraints", Quaternary Geochronology, 49: 230–235, Bibcode:2019QuGeo..49..230D, doi:10.1016/j.quageo.2018.05.002, S2CID 134501741
- Demkina, T.S. (2017), "Paleoecological crisis in the steppes of the Lower Volga region in the Middle of the Bronze Age (III–II centuries BC)", Eurasian Soil Science, 50 (7): 791–804, Bibcode:2017EurSS..50..791D, doi:10.1134/S1064229317070018, S2CID 133638705
- Erdosy, George, ed. (1995), The Indo-Aryans of Ancient South Asia: Language, Material Culture and Ethnicity, Walter de Gruyter, ISBN 978-3-11-014447-5
- Gupta, S. P., ed. (1995), The lost Sarasvati and the Indus Civilisation, Jodhpur: Kusumanjali Prakashan
- Gupta, S.P. (1999). Pande, G.C.; Chattophadhyaya, D.P. (eds.). The dawn of Indian civilization. History of Science, Philosophy and Culture in Indian Civilization, Part 1. Vol. I. New Delhi: Centre for Studies in Civilizations.
- Giosan; et al. (2012), "Fluvial landscapes of the Harappan civilization", PNAS, 109 (26): E1688–E1694, Bibcode:2012PNAS..109E1688G, doi:10.1073/pnas.1112743109, PMC 3387054, PMID 22645375
- Giosan, Liviu; Clift, Peter D.; Macklin, Mark G.; Fuller, Dorian Q. (10 October 2013), "Sarasvati II", Current Science, 105 (7): 888–890, JSTOR 24098502, archived from the original on 11 October 2021
- Jain, Sharad K.; Agarwal, Pushpendra K.; Singh, Vijay P. (2007), Hydrology and Water Resources of India, Springer Science & Business Media, Bibcode:2007hwri.book.....J, ISBN 9781402051807, archived from the original on 23 August 2023
- Kalyanaraman, S. (10–12 January 1997), "A project to revive the Sarasvati river: Role of GIS", National Seminar on Geographic Information Systems for Development Planning, Chennai: Renganathan Centre for Information Studies.
- Kenoyer, J. M. (1997). "Early city-states in south Asia: Comparing the Harappan phase and the Early Historic period". In Nichols, D.L.; Charlton, T.H. (eds.). The Archaeology of City States: Cross-cultural approaches. Washington, DC: Smithsonian Institution. pp. 52–70. ISBN 978-1560987222.
- Khonde, Nitesh; Kumar Singh, Sunil; Maur, D. M.; Rai, Vinai K.; Chamyal, L. S.; Giosan, Liviu (2017), "Tracing the Vedic Saraswati River in the Great Rann of Kachchh", Scientific Reports, 7 (1): 5476, Bibcode:2017NatSR...7.5476K, doi:10.1038/s41598-017-05745-8, PMC 5511136, PMID 28710495
- Lal, B. B. (2002), The Sarasvati flows on: the Continuity of Indian Culture, New Delhi: Aryan Books International
- Macdonell, Arthur Anthony; Keith, Arthur Berriedale (1912), Vedic Index of Names and Subjects
- Maemoku, Hideaki; Shitaoka, Yorinao; Nagatomo, Tsuneto; Yagi, Hiroshi (2013), "Geomorphological Constraints on the Ghaggar River Regime During the Mature Harappan Period", in Giosan, Liviu; Fuller, Dorian Q.; Nicoll, Kathleen; Flad, Rowan K.; Clift, Peter D. (eds.), Climates, Landscapes, and Civilizations, American Geophysical Union Monograph Series 198, John Wiley & Sons, ISBN 978-1-118-70443-1, archived from the original on 23 August 2023
- McIntosh, Jane (2008), The Ancient Indus Valley: New Perspectives, ABC-CLIO
- Misra, Virendra Nath (1992). Indus civilization, a special number of the eastern anthropologist. pp. 1–19.
- Mughal, Mohammed Rafique (1997), Ancient Cholistan: Archaeology and architecture, Rawalpindi
- Mukherjee, Ashoke (2001), "RIGVEDIC SARASVATI: MYTH AND REALITY" (PDF), Breakthrough, Breakthrough Science Society, 9 (1), archived (PDF) from the original on 24 September 2018
- Oldham, R. D. (1893). "The Saraswati and the Lost River of the Indian Desert". Journal of the Royal Asiatic Society: 49–76.
- Possehl, Gregory L. (December 1997). "The transformation of the Indus Civilization". Journal of World Prehistory. 11 (4): 425–472. doi:10.1007/bf02220556. JSTOR 25801118. S2CID 161129625.
- Possehl, Gregory L. (2002). The Indus Civilization: A Contemporary Perspective. Rowman Altamira. p. 8. ISBN 978-0-7591-0172-2. Archived from the original on 23 August 2023.
- Scharfe, Hartmut (1996). "Bartholomae's Law Revisited". Studien zur Indologie und Iranistik. XX (Festschrift Paul Thieme): 351–377.
- Schuldenrein, Joseph; Wright, Rita P.; Mughal, M. Rafique; Khan, M. Afzal (2004), "Landscapes, soils, and mound histories of the Upper Indus Valley, Pakistan: New insights on the Holocene environments near ancient Harappa", Journal of Archaeological Science, 31 (6): 777–797, Bibcode:2004JArSc..31..777S, doi:10.1016/j.jas.2003.10.015
- Shaffer, Jim G. (1995), "Cultural tradition and Palaeoethnicity in South Asian Archaeology", in Erdosy George (ed.), Indo-Aryans of Ancient South Asia, Berlin u.a.: de Gruyter, ISBN 978-3-11-014447-5
- Sindhav, Hetalben Dhanabhai (2016), "The Indus Valley Civilisation (Harappan Civilisation)", International Journal of Social Impact, 1 (2)
- Singh, Ajit; Thomsen, Kristina J.; Sinha, Rajiv; Buylaert, Jan-Pieter; Carter, Andrew; Mark, Darren F.; Mason, Philippa J.; Densmore, Alexander L.; Murray, Andrew S. (28 November 2017). "Counter-intuitive influence of Himalayan river morphodynamics on Indus Civilisation urban settlements". Nature Communications. 8 (1): 1617. Bibcode:2017NatCo...8.1617S. doi:10.1038/s41467-017-01643-9. ISSN 2041-1723. PMC 5705636. PMID 29184098.
- Sinha, Rajiv; Singh, Ajit; Tandon, Sampat K. (25 July 2020), "Fluvial archives of north and northwestern India as recorders of climatic signatures in the late Quaternary: review and assessment", Current Science, 119 (2): 232, doi:10.18520/cs/v119/i2/232-243, S2CID 239534661
- Tripathi, J.K. (2004). "Is river Ghaggar, Saraswati? Geochemical constraints". Current Science. 87 (8): 1141. Archived from the original on 23 January 2025.
- Valdiya, K.S. (2013), "The River Saraswati was a Himalayan-born river" (PDF), Current Science, 104 (1): 42, archived (PDF) from the original on 24 September 2018
- Wilke, Annette (2011), Sound and Communication: An Aesthetic Cultural History of Sanskrit Hinduism, Walter de Gruyter, ISBN 978-3-11-018159-3, archived from the original on 23 August 2023
- Witzel, Michael (2001), "Autochthonous Aryans? The Evidence from Old Indian and Iranian Texts" (PDF), Electronic Journal of Vedic Studies, 7 (3): 1–93, archived (PDF) from the original on 17 February 2022

Web-sources
