= Sirsa district =

Coordinates: 29°32′24″N 75°01′48″E

- District of Haryana
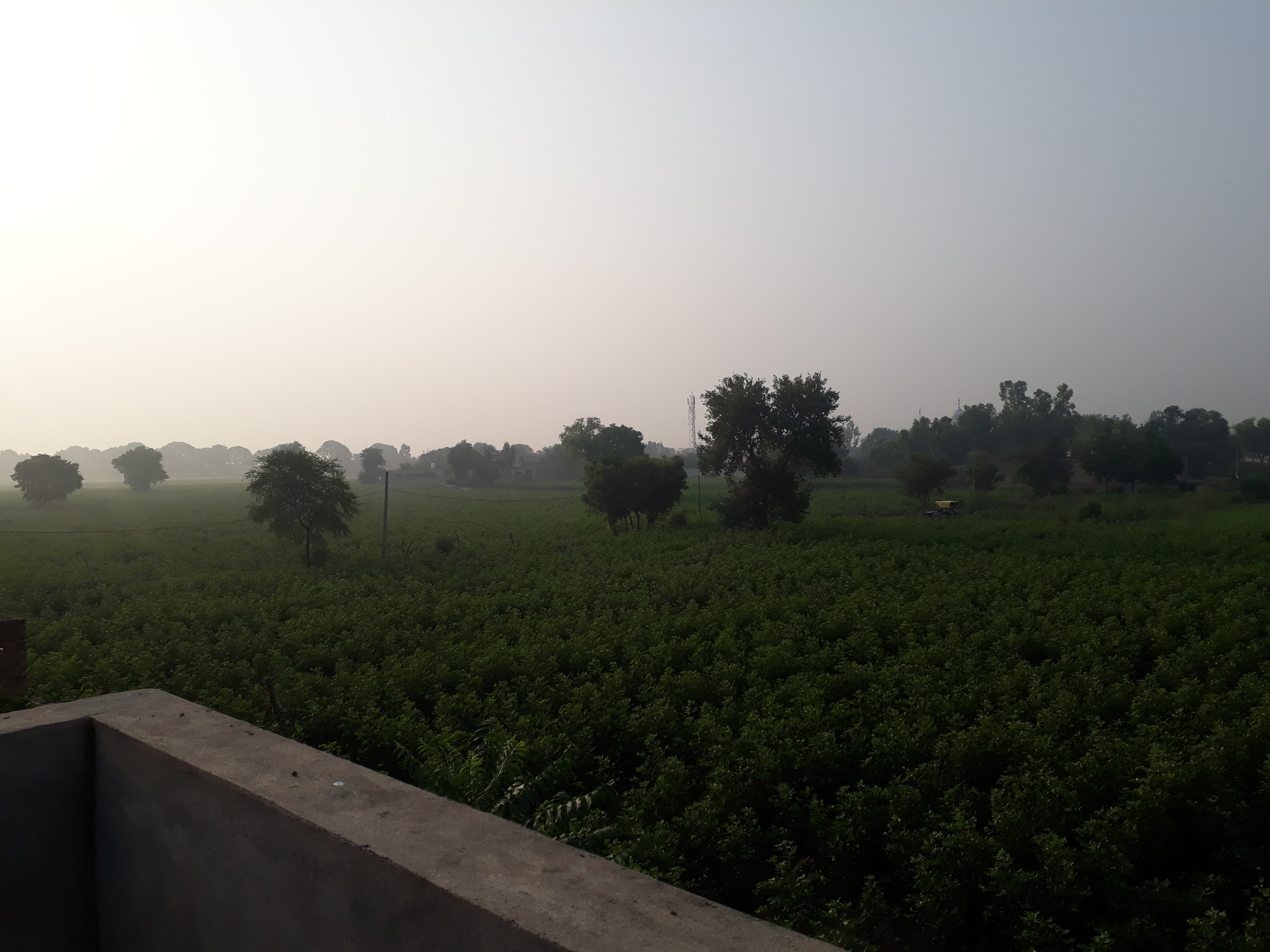
- Fields in Sirsa district

- Location in Haryana
- Country: India
- State: Haryana
- Headquarters: Sirsa
- Tehsils: 1.Sirsa, 2.Kalanwali, 3.Dabwali, 4.Rania, 5.Ellenabad, 6.Nauthsari Chopta

Area
  - Total: 4,277 km^{2} (1,651 sq mi)

Population (2011)
  - Total: 1,295,189

Demographics
  - Literacy: 60.55%
  - Sex ratio: 897 (2011 census estimates)

Languages
  - Official: Hindi
  - Additional official: English; Punjabi
- Time zone: UTC+05:30 (IST)
- Vehicle registration: HR24 HR57
- Major highways: NH 9
- Lok Sabha constituencies: Sirsa (shared with Fatehabad district)
- Vidhan Sabha constituencies: 5
- Website: https://sirsa.gov.in/

Sirsa district is the largest district by area in Haryana state, India. Sirsa is the district headquarter. It is located on National Highway 9 and 250 kilometres (160 mi) from the national capital Delhi. On 1 September 1975, Sirsa became a district by taking Sirsa and Dabwali tahsils from Hisar District. There are a total of 342 villages in Sirsa district.

== Economy ==
In 2006 the Ministry of Panchayati Raj named Sirsa as one of the country's 250 most backward districts (out of a total of 640). It is one of the two districts in Haryana that used to receive funds from the Backward Regions Grant Fund Programme (BRGF).

== Demographics ==
Historical population
Year	Pop.	±% p.a.
1901	165,167	—
1911	170,733	+0.33%
1921	173,476	+0.16%
1931	190,772	+0.95%
1941	213,522	+1.13%
1951	221,282	+0.36%
1961	370,665	+5.29%
1971	533,604	+3.71%
1981	707,068	+2.85%
1991	903,536	+2.48%
2001	1,116,649	+2.14%
2011	1,295,189	+1.49%

According to the 2011 census Sirsa district has a population of 1,295,189. This gives it a ranking of 378th in India (out of a total of 640). The district has a population density of 303 inhabitants per square kilometre (780/sq mi). As of the 2011 census, its population growth rate over the decade 2001-2011 was 15.99%, with a sex ratio of 897 females for every 1000 males and a literacy rate of 70.9%. Scheduled Castes make up 29.91% of the population.

=== Religion ===
Religion in Sirsa district (2011)
Religion	Percent
Hinduism	72.60%
Sikhism	26.17%
Islam	0.74%
Christianity	0.17%
Other or not stated	0.33%

Religion in Sirsa District (1941) (Note: 1941 figures are for Sirsa Tehsil, which roughly matches present-day district borders. District was incorporated to take into account population increases during the post-independence era, which has resulted in various bifurcations of districts and tehsils across the historic Punjab Province region.)
Religion	Population (1941)	Percentage (1941)
Hinduism (Note: 1941 census: Including Ad-Dharmis)	98,161	45.78%
Islam	78,048	36.4%
Sikhism	36,657	17.1%
Christianity	420	0.2%
Others (Note: Including Jainism, Buddhism, Zoroastrianism, Judaism, or not stated)	1,118	0.52%
Total Population	214,404	100%

=== Languages ===
Languages of Sirsa district (2011)
1. Punjabi (41.5%)
2. Bagri (31.8%)
3. Hindi (21.6%)
4. Haryanvi (3.72%)
5. Others (1.43%)

Hindi is the official language of the district, while Punjabi and English serve as additional official languages. Punjabi is also the most spoken language of the district. Other languages with significant speakers are Bagri and Haryanvi.

Rank	Language	1881	1961	1991	2001	2011
1	Punjabi	57.00%	—	35.54%	33.42%	41.47%
2	Hindi	—	—	65.34%	65.94%	58.03%
3	Urdu	—	—	0.02%	0.07%	0.47%
—	Hindustani	43.00%	—	—	—	—
—	Other	—	—	0.10%	0.57%	1.36%

== Notable people from Sirsa district ==
- Barinder Sran - Indian cricketer
- Devi Lal - former Deputy Prime Minister of India, former Chief Minister of Haryana
- Harpal Singh - Indian former field hockey player
- Ganeshi Lal - Governor of Odisha
- Gajendra Verma - singer, composer, lyricist
- Gopal Kanda - businessman and politician, member of the Haryana Legislative Assembly
- Gurmeet Ram Rahim Singh - head of Dera Sacha Sauda
- Hari Singh Dilbar - Punjabi language poet
- Jagdish Nehra - former Education and Irrigation Minister
- Jaswinder Brar - Punjabi folk singer
- Maninder Buttar - Punjabi Singer
- Manmohan Singh - director, cinematographer, singer in Hindi & Punjabi movies
- Om Prakash Chautala - former Chief Minister of Haryana
- Rupinder Handa - Punjabi singer
- Sardara Singh - former Indian hockey team Captain
- Satwant Kaur - Bollywood and Punjabi actress
- Savita Punia - national hockey player
- Sunil Grover - comedian and actor
- Vikram Singh - music producer - composer
