= Jodhpur–Hadapsar (Pune) Superfast Express =

Train in India

Jodhpur - Hadapsar (Pune) Superfast Express
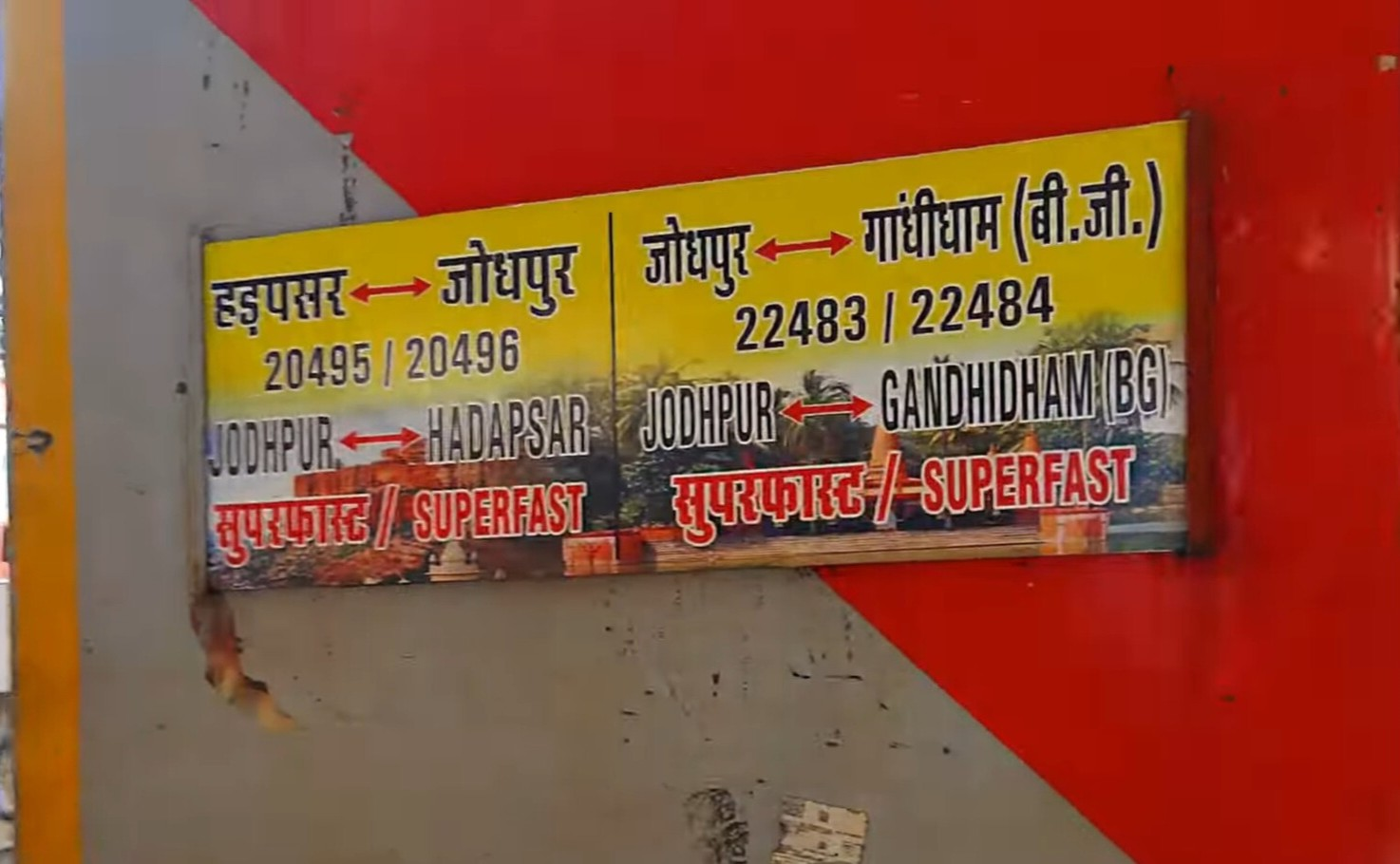

Overview
- Service type: Superfast
- Status: Active
- Locale: Rajasthan, Gujarat & Maharashtra
- First service: 5 May 2025; 16 months ago
- Current operator: North Western Railway (NWR)

Route
- Termini: Jodhpur (JU); Hadapsar (HDP)
- Stops: 22
- Distance travelled: 1,092 km (679 mi)
- Average journey time: 19h 10m
- Service frequency: Daily
- Train number: 20495 / 20496

On-board services
- Classes: AC 2 tier, AC 3 tier, AC 3rd tier Economy, Sleeper class, General Unreserved
- Seating arrangements: Yes
- Sleeping arrangements: Yes
- Catering facilities: Pantry Car On-board Catering E-catering
- Observation facilities: Large windows
- Baggage facilities: No
- Other facilities: Below the seats

Technical
- Rolling stock: LHB coach
- Track gauge: 1,676 mm (5 ft 6 in)
- Operating speed: 57 km/h (35 mph) average including halts.

The 20495 / 20496 Jodhpur–Hadapsar (Pune) Superfast Express is an Superfast Express train belonging to North Western Railway zone that runs between Jodhpur and Hadapsar (Pune) in India.

== Schedule ==
• 20495 - 10:00 PM (Daily) [Jodhpur]

• 20496 - 7:15 PM (Daily) [Hadapsar]

== Routes and halts ==
The Important Halts of the train are :

● Jodhpur

● Luni Junction

● Pali Marwar

● Marwar Junction

● Somesar

● Rani

● Falna

● Jawai Bandh

● Pindwara

● Abu Road

● Palanpur Junction

● Mahesana Junction

● Sabarmati Junction

● Vadodara Junction

● Surat

● Vapi

● Vasai Road

● Kalyan Junction

● Lonavla

● Chinchwad

● Pune Junction

● Hadapsar

== Traction ==
As the entire route is fully electrified it is hauled by a Bhagat Ki Kothi Loco Shed-based WAP-7 electric locomotive from Jodhpur to Hadapsar and vice versa.

== Rake share ==
The train will Rake Sharing with Gandhidham–Jodhpur Express (22483/22484).

== See also ==
Trains from Jodhpur :

1. Jodhpur–Indore Express
2. Jodhpur–Sabarmati (Ahmedabad) Vande Bharat Express
3. Jodhpur–Delhi Sarai Rohilla Superfast Express
4. Jodhpur–Bangalore City Express (via Guntakal)
5. Suryanagri Express

Trains from Hadapsar :

1. Kazipet–Hadapsar Express

== Notes ==
a. Runs daily in a week with both directions.
