= Falna railway station =

Railway station in Rajasthan, India

General information
- Location: State Highway 16, Falna, Rajasthan; India
- Coordinates: 25.2359°N 73.2351°E
- Elevation: 282 metres (925 ft)
- System: Indian Railways station
- Owner: Indian Railways
- Operator: North Western Railway
- Platforms: 3
- Tracks: 4 (construction – doubling of diesel + electrification 5 ft 6 in (1,676 mm) broad gauge)
- Connections: Auto – Taxi stand, Falna RSRTC bus stand 50m–100m away.

Construction
- Structure type: Standard (on-ground station)
- Parking: Yes
- Cycle facilities: No

Other information
- Status: Functioning
- Station code: FA
- Zone(s): North Western Railway
- Division(s): Ajmer
Location

Falna railway station is a railway station serving Falna, a town in Pali district, Rajasthan. Its code is FA.

It is one of the "A" category stations of Ajmer division in North Western Railway zone. The station falls on the Jaipur-Ahmedabad line. Due to large passenger traffic, it is the second highest earning station in Ajmer division. The station consists of 3 platforms. The platform is well sheltered. Many facilities including Water Vending Machine, Ticket Vending Machine and sanitation . Falna Station equipped with 70 kW solar power supply. Falna Railway station is a part of Western Dedicated Freight Corridor. Construction had already begun & will be completed within few years.

== Major trains ==
Being a "A" category railway station, around 87 trains halt at Falna. Many important trains halts at Falna, most prominent of them being the Swarna Jayanti Rajdhani Express. Some of the other important trains that run from Falna are:

- Bandra Terminus - Bikaner AC Superfast Express
- Chennai Egmore-Jodhpur Superfast Express
- Mysore-Ajmer Express
- Puri-Ajmer Express
- Hisar-Coimbatore AC Superfast Express
- Agra Cantt-Ahmedabad Superfast Express
- Sabarmati-Ajmer Intercity Express
- Ahmedabad-Jammu Tawi Express
- Hazur Sahib Nanded-Shri Ganganagar Superfast Express
- Ahmedabad–Jodhpur Passenger
- Ahmedabad–Jaipur Passenger
- Kishanganj–Ajmer Garib Nawaz Express
- Dadar–Ajmer Superfast Express
- Mysore–Ajmer Express
- Ala Hazrat Express (via Ahmedabad)
- Amrapur Aravali Express
- Ashram Express
- Bhagat Ki Kothi–KSR Bengaluru Express
- Bhagat Ki Kothi–Yesvantpur SpecialFare Special
- Bhagat Ki Kothi–Pune Express
- Bhavnagar Terminus–Delhi Sarai Rohilla Link Express
- Bhavnagar Terminus–Jammu Tawi SpecialFare Special
- Yesvantpur–Bikaner Express
- Chandigarh–Bandra Terminus Superfast Express
- Rajkot–Delhi Sarai Rohilla Weekly Superfast Express
- Delhi Sarai Rohilla–Bandra Terminus Garib Rath Express
- Porbandar–Delhi Sarai Rohilla Superfast Express
- Hazur Sahib Nanded–Ajmer Gokripa Mahotsav Special
- Jaipur–Okha Weekly Express
- Jammu Tawi–Bandra Terminus Vivek Express
- Valsad–Jodhpur Weekly Express
- Ranakpur Express
- Ahmedabad–Kolkata Express
- Suryanagri Express
- Uttaranchal Express
- Yesvantpur–Bhagat Ki Kothi Suvidha Special
- Haridwar Mail
