= Unawa Aithor railway station =

Railway station in Gujarat, India

Unawa Aithor

General information
- Location: State Highway 41, Aithor, Mehsana district, Gujarat; India
- Coordinates: 23°45′34″N 72°23′06″E
- Elevation: 108 metres (354 ft)
- System: Indian Railways station
- Owner: Indian Railways
- Operator: Western Railway
- Line: Ahmedabad–Jaipur line
- Platforms: 1
- Tracks: Double Electric-Line

Construction
- Structure type: Standard (on ground)

Other information
- Status: Functioning
- Station code: UAR
- Zone(s): Western Railway zone
- Division(s): Ahmedabad

Services
Preceding station	Indian Railways	Following station
Unjha towards ?	Western Railway zone Ahmedabad–Jaipur line	Bhandu Motidau towards ?
Location
- Interactive map

Unawa Aithor railway station is a railway station in located on Ahmedabad–Jaipur railway line operated by the Western Railway under Ahmedabad railway division. It is situated beside State Highway 41 at Aithor in Mehsana district in the Indian state of Gujarat.
