= Unjha railway station =

Railway station in Gujarat, India

Unjha

General information
- Location: Unjha, Gujarat; India
- Coordinates: 23°47′48″N 72°22′55″E
- Elevation: 115 metres (377 ft)
- System: Indian Railway Station
- Owner: Ministry of Railways, Indian Railways
- Operator: Western Railway
- Lines: Ahmedabad–Delhi main line Jaipur - Ahmedabad line
- Platforms: 2
- Tracks: 3

Construction
- Structure type: Standard (On Ground)
- Parking: No

Other information
- Status: Functioning
- Station code: UJA
- Zone(s): Western Railway
- Division(s): Ahmedabad
Location
- Location within India Location within Gujarat

Unjha railway station is a railway station in Mahesana district, Gujarat, India on the Western line of the Western railway network. Unjha railway station is 21 km away from Mahesana Junction. Passenger, Express, and Superfast trains halt here.

== Nearby Stations ==
Kamli is the nearest railway station towards Palanpur Junction, whereas Unawa Aithor is the nearest railway station towards Ahmedabad Junction.

== Major Trains ==
The following Express and Superfast trains halt at Unjha railway station in both directions:

- 14805/06 Yesvantpur - Barmer AC Express
- 14803/04 Bhagat Ki Kothi - Ahmedabad Weekly Express
- 12989/90 Dadar - Ajmer Superfast Express
- 12915/16 Ahmedabad - New Delhi Ashram Superfast Express
- 19565/66 Okha - Dehradun Uttaranchal Express
- 19707/08 Bandra Terminus - Jaipur Amrapur Aravali Express
- 19413/14 Ahmedabad - Kolkata Sare Jahan Se Accha Express
- 19411/12 Ahmedabad - Ajmer Intercity Express
- 19031/32 Ahmedabad - Haridwar Yoga Express
- 19223/24 Ahmedabad - Jammu Tawi Express
