= Pindwara railway station =

Railway station in Rajasthan, India

Sirohi Road railway station

General information
- Location: Sirohi Road, Pindwara, Sirohi district, Rajasthan; India
- Coordinates: 24.7892271°N 73.0361537°E
- Elevation: 370 metres (1,210 ft)
- System: Indian Railways station
- Owner: Indian Railways
- Operator: North Western Railway
- Line: Jaipur–Ahmedabad line
- Platforms: 2
- Tracks: 2

Construction
- Structure type: Standard on ground
- Parking: Yes
- Cycle facilities: No

Other information
- Status: Functioning
- Station code: SR and PDWA
- Zone(s): North Western Railway Zone
- Division(s): Ajmer
Location
- Location within India Location within Rajasthan

Sirohi Road railway station, also known as Pindwara railway station, is located in Pindwara town of Sirohi district in Rajasthan. It serves Sirohi town and Pindwara town. It has two platforms. Its code is PDWA. Express and Superfast trains halt here.

Initially, the name of the railway station was Sirohi Road. The name was changed to Pindwara railway station on 31 October 2017, after railway passengers were confused by the name Sirohi Road.

== Trains ==
- Chennai Egmore–Jodhpur Superfast Express
- Hazur Sahib Nanded–Shri Ganganagar Express
- Rajkot–Delhi Sarai Rohilla Weekly Express
- Bhavnagar Terminus–Delhi Sarai Rohilla Link Express
- Jodhpur - Bandra Terminus Suryanagri Express
- Dadar–Ajmer Superfast Express
- Hanumangarh - Dadar Ranakpur Express
- Mysore–Ajmer Express
- Valsad–Jodhpur Weekly Express
- Gandhinagar Capital ( Sabarmati)–Daulatpur Chowk Express
- Shri Ganganagar - Bandra Terminus Amrapur Aravali Express
- Sabarmati - Yog Nagari Rishikesh Yoga Express
- Ahmedabad–Kolkata Express
- Puri–Ajmer Express
- Hadapsar- Jodhpur Express
- Bhuj - Delhi Sarai Rohilla Weekly Superfast Express
- GANDHIGARM (Sabarmati) - Agra Cant Superfast Express
- Gandhigarm(Sabarmati ) - Gwalior Superfast Express
- Bandra Terminus - Delhi Sarai Rohilla Weekly Superfast Express
- Bandra Terminus - Delhi Sarai Rohilla (Grib Rath Express)
- Sabarmati - Thave (Gorakhpur) Express
- Sabarmati - Jammu Tawi Express
- Bandra Terminal - Hisar Superfast Express
- Sabarmati - Lucknow Express
- Jodhpur - Gandhigarm ( Sabarmati) Demu
