= Kamli railway station =

Railway station in Gujarat, India

Kamli
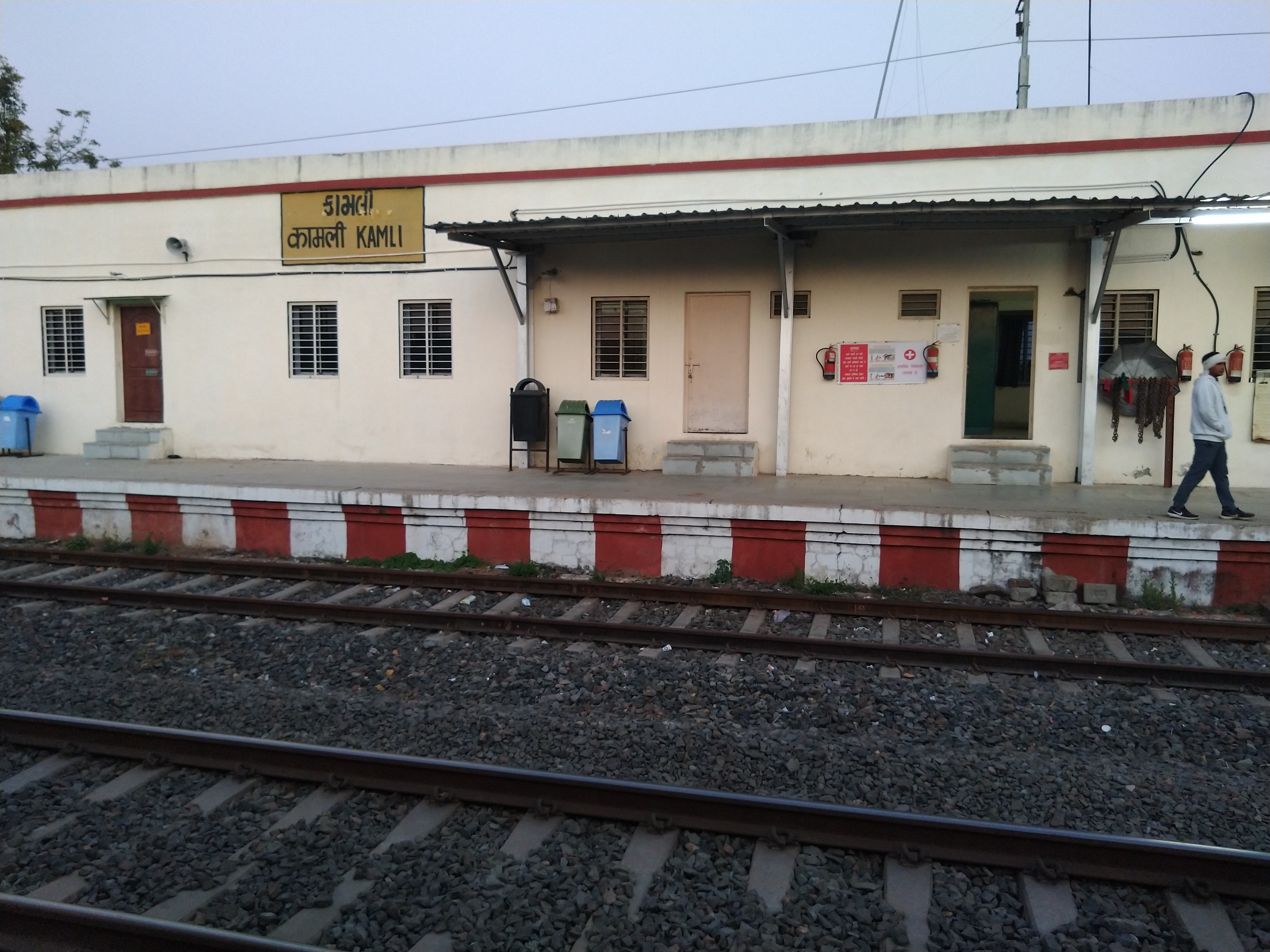
- Kamli railway station

General information
- Location: Kamli, Mehsana district, Gujarat; India
- Coordinates: 23°51′47″N 72°22′33″E
- Elevation: 126 metres (413 ft)
- System: Indian Railways station
- Owner: Indian Railways
- Operator: Western Railway
- Line: Ahmedabad–Jaipur line
- Platforms: 1
- Tracks: Double Electric-Line

Construction
- Structure type: Standard (on ground)

Other information
- Status: Functioning
- Station code: KMLI
- Zone(s): Western Railway zone
- Division(s): Ahmedabad

Services
Preceding station	Indian Railways	Following station
Siddhpur towards ?	Western Railway zone Ahmedabad–Jaipur line	Unjha towards ?
Location
- Interactive map

Kamli railway station is a railway station in located on Ahmedabad–Jaipur railway line operated by the Western Railway under Ahmedabad railway division. It is situated at Kamli at in Mehsana district in the Indian state of Gujarat.
