= Dharewada railway station =

Railway station in Gujarat, India

Dharewada

General information
- Location: Mahesana-Palanpur Highway, Dharewada, Banaskantha district, Gujarat; India
- Coordinates: 23°57′39″N 72°22′43″E
- Elevation: 146 metres (479 ft)
- System: Indian Railways station
- Owner: Indian Railways
- Operator: Western Railway
- Line: Ahmedabad–Jaipur line
- Platforms: 1
- Tracks: Double Electric-Line

Construction
- Structure type: Standard (on ground)

Other information
- Status: Functioning
- Station code: DRW
- Zone(s): Western Railway zone
- Division(s): Ahmedabad

Services
Preceding station	Indian Railways	Following station
Chhapi towards ?	Western Railway zone Ahmedabad–Jaipur line	Siddhpur towards ?
Location
- Interactive map

Dharewada railway station is a railway station in located on Ahmedabad–Jaipur railway line operated by the Western Railway under Ahmedabad railway division. It is situated beside Mahesana-Palanpur Highway at Dharewada at in Banaskantha district in the Indian state of Gujarat.
