= Umardashi railway station =

Railway station in Gujarat, India

Umardashi
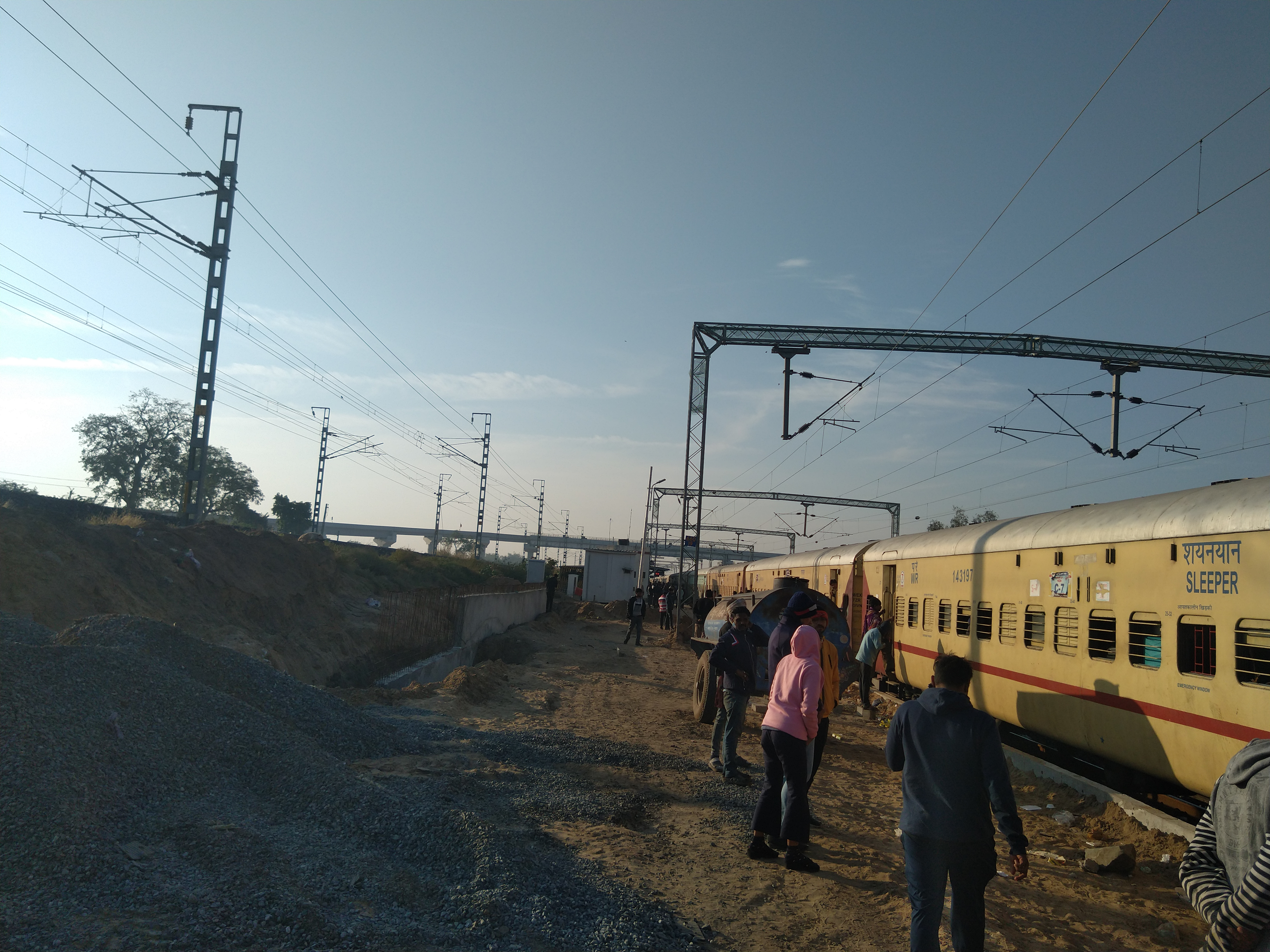
- Umardashi railway station

General information
- Location: Chitrasani, Sedrasana, Banaskantha district, Gujarat; India
- Coordinates: 24°06′01″N 72°25′14″E
- Elevation: 187 metres (614 ft)
- System: Indian Railways station
- Owner: Indian Railways
- Operator: Western Railway
- Line: Ahmedabad–Jaipur line
- Platforms: 1
- Tracks: Double Electric-Line

Construction
- Structure type: Standard (on ground)

Other information
- Status: Functioning
- Station code: UM
- Zone(s): Western Railway zone
- Division(s): Ahmedabad

Services
Preceding station	Indian Railways	Following station
Palanpur Junction towards ?	Western Railway zone Ahmedabad–Jaipur line	Chhapi towards ?
Location
- Interactive map

Umardashi railway station is a railway station in located on Ahmedabad–Jaipur railway line operated by the Western Railway under Ahmedabad railway division. It is situated at Chitrasani, Sedrasana in Banaskantha district in the Indian state of Gujarat.
