= Ranpur railway station =

Railway station in Gujarat, India

General information
- Location: Ranpur, Gujarat; India
- Coordinates: 22°21′34″N 71°43′03″E
- Elevation: 63 m (206.7 ft)
- System: Indian Railway Station
- Owner: Ministry of Railways, Indian Railways
- Operator: Western Railway
- Line: Surendranagar–Bhavnagar line
- Platforms: 2
- Tracks: 2

Construction
- Structure type: Standard (On Ground)
- Parking: No
- Cycle facilities: No

Other information
- Status: Functioning
- Station code: RUR
- Zone(s): Western Railway
- Division(s): Bhavnagar
Location
- Location within Gujarat

Ranpur railway station is a railway station serving in Botad district of Gujarat State of India. It is under Bhavnagar railway division of Western Railway Zone of Indian Railways. Ranpur railway station is 28 km far away from Botad Junction. Passenger and Superfast trains halt here.

== Major trains ==
Following major trains halt at Ranpur railway station in both direction:

- 12971/72 Bhavnagar Terminus - Bandra Terminus Superfast Express
- 19579/80 Bhavnagar Terminus - Delhi Sarai Rohilla Link Express

== See also ==
- Bhavnagar State Railway
