= Bhavnagar Terminus–Delhi Sarai Rohilla Link Express =

Indian rail route

Bhavnagar Terminus–Haridwar Express

Overview
- Service type: Express
- First service: 12 February 2015; 11 years ago
- Current operator: Western Railway

Route
- Termini: Bhavnagar Terminus (BVC); Delhi Sarai Rohilla (DEE)
- Stops: 37
- Distance travelled: 1,161 km (721 mi)
- Average journey time: 25 hrs 15 mins
- Service frequency: Weekly (Note: Runs one day in a week for each direction.)
- Train number: 59272/19579, 19580/59233

On-board services
- Classes: AC 3 tier, Sleeper class, General Unreserved
- Seating arrangements: Yes
- Sleeping arrangements: Yes
- Observation facilities: Standard ICF
- Entertainment facilities: No
- Baggage facilities: No

Technical
- Rolling stock: 2
- Track gauge: 1,676 mm (5 ft 6 in)
- Operating speed: 46 km/h (29 mph), including halts

The (59272/19579, 19580/59233) Bhavnagar Terminus–Delhi Sarai Rohilla Link Express is an Express train belonging to Western Railway zone that runs between Bhavnagar Terminus and Delhi Sarai Rohilla in India. It is currently being operated on a weekly basis.

Bhavnagar Terminus–Delhi Sarai Rohilla Link Express has five coaches, which are attached with 59272/Bhavnagar–Surendranagar Passenger and detached at Surendranagar Junction. Then, these coaches are attached to 19579/80 Rajkot–Delhi Sarai Rohilla Weekly Express for its destination Delhi Sarai Rohilla.

In return, five coaches are detached from 19579/80 Delhi Sarai Rohilla–Rajkot Weekly Express and attached to 59233/Surendranagar–Bhavnagar Passenger at Surendranagar Junction for its destination Bhavnagar Terminus.

== Coach composition ==
The train has standard ICF rakes with max speed of 110 kmph. The train consists of five coaches:

- 1 AC III Tier
- 3 Sleeper coaches
- 1 Seating cum Luggage Rake

== Service ==
- 59272/19579 Bhavnagar Terminus–Delhi Sarai Rohilla Link Express has an average speed of 45 km/h and covers 1161 km in 26 hrs.
- 19580/59233 Delhi Sarai Rohilla–Bhavnagar Terminus Link Express has an average speed of 47 km/h and covers 1161 km in 24 hrs 35 mins.

== Route and halts ==
The important stops of the train are:

- Bhavnagar Terminus
- Botad Junction
- Surendranagar Junction
- Viramgam Junction
- Mahesana Junction
- Palanpur Junction
- Abu Road
- Pindwara
- Falna
- Marwar Junction
- Ajmer Junction
- Kishangarh
- Phulera Junction
- Jaipur Junction
- Dausa
- Bandikui Junction
- Alwar Junction
- Rewari Junction
- Gurgaon
- Delhi Cantonment
- Delhi Sarai Rohilla

== Schedule ==
Train number	Station code	Departure station	Departure time	Departure day	Arrival station	Arrival time	Arrival day
59272/19579	BVC	Bhavnagar Terminus	08:15 AM	Thu	Delhi Sarai Rohilla	10:15 AM	Fri
19580/59233	DEE	Delhi Sarai Rohilla	13:20 PM	Fri	Bhavnagar Terminus	13:55 PM	Sat

== See also ==
- Rajkot–Delhi Sarai Rohilla Weekly Express
