= Chhapi =

Village in Gujarat, India

Coordinates: 21°1′48″N 72°24′0″E

Chhapi is a village in Gujarat, India.

== Geography ==
The village is located near the State Highway 41 and between the villages of Siddhpur and Kanodar. The village is surrounded by fields. Chhapi has a height of 1.25 km and a width of 662.42 m. Jay Bharat Hindu Lodge

Chhapi is known for its railway station and the railway line that passes through it. Railway line is progressing to convert it in electric train.

== Features ==
In northern Chhapi there is: mosque, hospital, pharmacy, school, temples, various stores, houses.

Chhapi is well known for going to Magarwada the Jain Tirth; approx. 7 km, and on the same road you can go to Ambaji the Hindu Tirth. Chhapi is well known for its Jain temple which was renovated in 2008–2009. Chhapi is also known for timber business. Population is near about 15,000 of Chhapi.

== Transport ==
Chhapi railway station is located in Chhapi.

== Notable people ==
The founder of pharmaceutical company Torrent Group lived here and they own a house here.
