= Valsad–Bhagat Ki Kothi Weekly Express =

Train in India

Valsad-Bhagat Ki Kothi Weekly Express
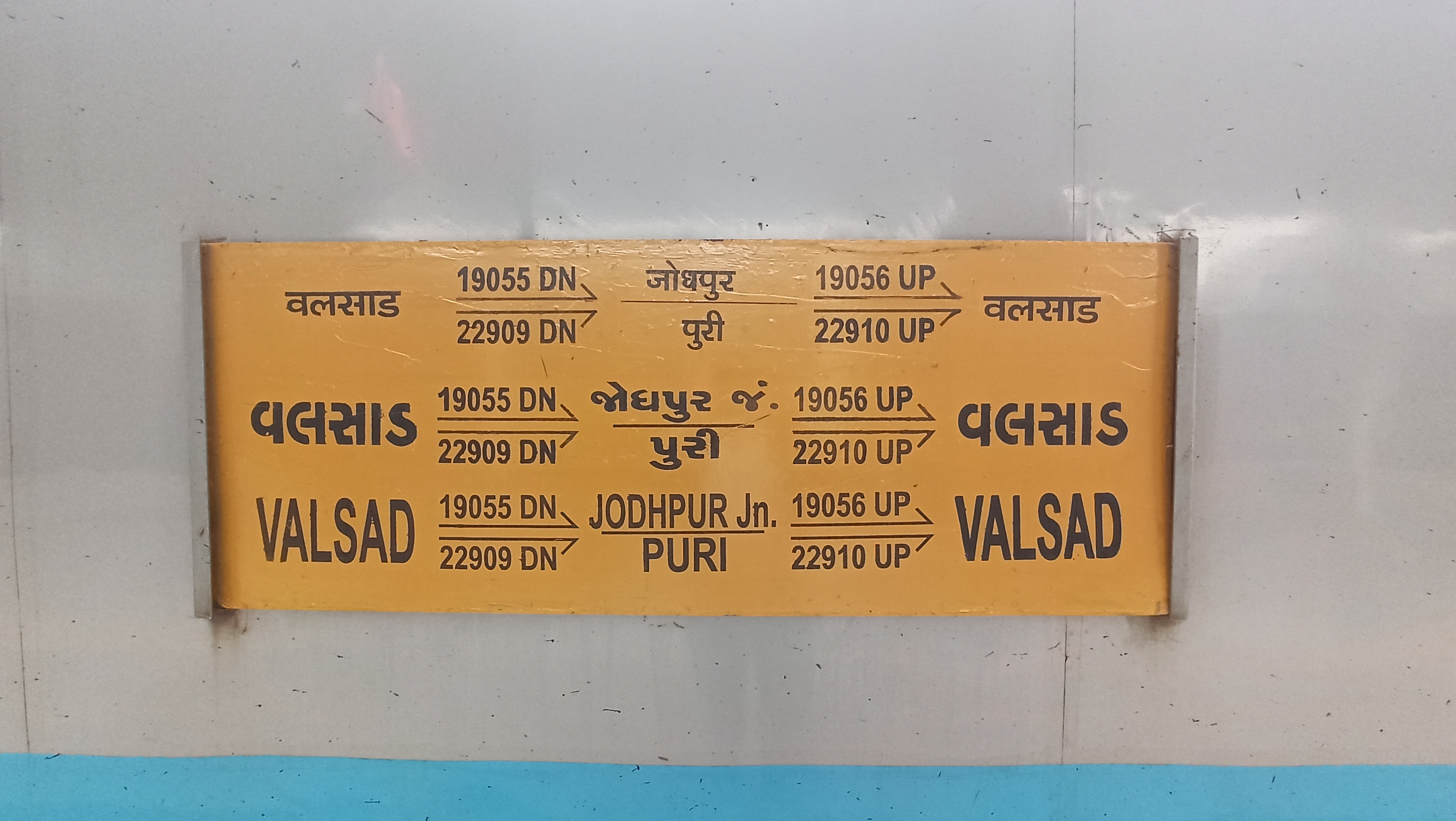

Overview
- Service type: Express
- Locale: Gujarat & Rajasthan
- First service: 25 July 2012; 14 years ago
- Current operator: Western Railway

Route
- Termini: Valsad (BL); Bhagat Ki Kothi (BGKT)
- Stops: 15
- Distance travelled: 752 km (467 mi)
- Average journey time: 13 hrs 10 mins
- Service frequency: Weekly (Note: Runs one day in a week for every direction.)
- Train number: 22991 / 22992

On-board services
- Classes: AC 2 Tier, AC 3 Tier, Sleeper Class, General Unreserved
- Seating arrangements: Yes
- Sleeping arrangements: Yes
- Catering facilities: On-board Catering, E-Catering
- Observation facilities: Large windows
- Baggage facilities: No
- Other facilities: Below the seats

Technical
- Rolling stock: LHB coach
- Track gauge: 1,676 mm (5 ft 6 in)
- Operating speed: 130 km/h (81 mph) maximum, 57 km/h (35 mph) average including halts.

The 22991 / 22992 Valsad-Bhagat Ki Kothi Weekly Express is an express train belonging to Western Railway zone that runs between Valsad and Bhagat Ki Kothi in India. It is currently being operated with 22991/22992 train numbers on a weekly basis.

== Service ==
The 22991 Valsad - Bhagat Ki Kothi Weekly Express has an average speed of 57 km/h and covers 754 km in 13h 10m.

The 22992 Bhagat Ki Kothi - Valsad Weekly Express has an average speed of 55 km/h and covers 754 km in 13h 30m.

== Route and halts ==
The important halts of the train are:

- Valsad
- Navsari
- Surat
- Bharuch Junction
- Vadodara Junction
- Anand Junction
- Nadiad Junction
- Ahmedabad Junction
- Sabarmati Junction
- Mahesana Junction
- Palanpur Junction
- Abu Road
- Pindwara
- Falna
- Marwar Junction
- Pali Marwar
- Luni Junction
- Bhagat Ki Kothi

== Coach composite ==
The train has LHB rakes with a maximum speed of 130 km/h. The train consists of 22 coaches:

- 2 AC II Tier
- 6 AC III Tier
- 8 Sleeper Coaches
- 4 General Unreserved
- 2 End-on Generator.

== Traction ==
Both trains are hauled by a Valsad Loco Shed based WAP-7 electric locomotive from Valsad to Bhagat Ki Kothi and vice versa.

== Schedule ==
Train Number	Station Code	Departure Station	Departure Time	Departure Day	Arrival Station	Arrival Time	Arrival Day
22991	BL	Valsad	18:30 PM	Tuesday	Bhagat Ki Kothi	07:55 AM	Wednesday
22992	BGKT	Bhagat Ki Kothi	18:50 PM	Wednesday	Valsad	08:30 AM	Thursday

== Rake sharing ==
The train shares its rake with 22909/22910 Valsad-Puri Superfast Express.

== See also ==
- Valsad railway station
- Jodhpur Junction railway station
- Valsad-Puri Superfast Express
