= Siddhpur railway station =

Railway station in Gujarat, India

Siddhpur
- Siddhpur railway station

General information
- Location: Siddhpur, Gujarat; India
- Coordinates: 23°55′05″N 72°22′05″E
- Elevation: 135 metres (443 ft)
- System: Indian Railway Station
- Owner: Ministry of Railways, Indian Railways
- Operator: Western Railway
- Lines: Ahmedabad–Delhi main line Jaipur - Ahmedabad line
- Platforms: 2
- Tracks: 3

Construction
- Structure type: Standard (On Ground)
- Parking: No

Other information
- Status: Functioning
- Station code: SID
- Zone(s): Western Railway
- Division(s): Ahmedabad
Location
- Location within India Location within Gujarat

Siddhpur railway station is a railway station in Patan district, Gujarat, India on the Western line of the Western railway network. Siddhpur railway station is 35 km away from Mahesana Junction. Passenger, Express and Superfast trains halt here.

== Nearby stations ==
Dharewada is the nearest railway station towards Palanpur Junction, whereas Kamli is the nearest railway station towards Ahmedabad Junction.

== Trains ==
The following Express and Superfast trains halt at Siddhpur railway station in both directions:

- 14805/06 Yesvantpur - Barmer AC Express
- 14803/04 Bhagat Ki Kothi - Ahmedabad Weekly Express
- 16507/08 Jodhpur - Bangalore City Express (via Hubballi)
- 19565/66 Okha - Dehradun Uttaranchal Express
- 19707/08 Bandra Terminus - Jaipur Amrapur Aravali Express
- 19413/14 Ahmedabad - Kolkata Sare Jahan Se Accha Express
- 19411/12 Ahmedabad - Ajmer Intercity Express
- 19031/32 Ahmedabad - Haridwar Yoga Express
- 19223/24 Ahmedabad - Jammu Tawi Express
