= Bhandu Motidau railway station =

Railway station in Gujarat, India

Bhandu Motidau

General information
- Location: Bhandu Motidau, Mehsana district, Gujarat; India
- Coordinates: 23°42′33″N 72°23′22″E
- Elevation: 97 metres (318 ft)
- System: Indian Railways station
- Owner: Indian Railways
- Operator: Western Railway
- Line: Ahmedabad–Jaipur line
- Platforms: 1
- Tracks: Double Electric-Line

Construction
- Structure type: Standard (on ground)

Other information
- Status: Functioning
- Station code: BHU
- Zone(s): Western Railway zone
- Division(s): Ahmedabad

Services
Preceding station	Indian Railways	Following station
Unawa Aithor towards ?	Western Railway zone Ahmedabad–Jaipur line	Mahesana towards ?
Location
- Interactive map

Bhandu Motidau railway station is a railway station in located on Ahmedabad–Jaipur railway line operated by the Western Railway under Ahmedabad railway division. It is situated at Bhandu Motidau in Mehsana district in the Indian state of Gujarat.
