= Chennai Egmore–Nagercoil Express =

Superfast Train of Southern Railway in India

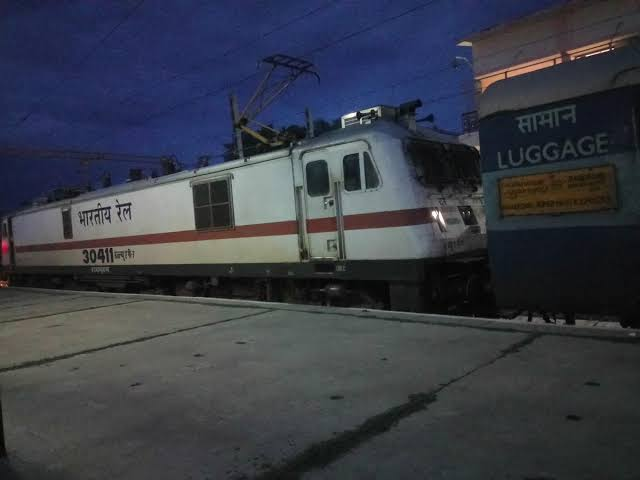
- 12668 Nagercoil - Chennai Egmore Express At Tirunelveli Junction in 30411 RPM/WAP-7

Overview
- Service type: Superfast
- Status: Active
- Locale: Tamilnadu
- First service: 9 November 2006; 19 years ago
- Current operator: Southern Railway zone

Route
- Termini: Chennai Egmore (MS); Nagercoil Junction (NCJ)
- Stops: 9
- Distance travelled: 724 km (450 mi)
- Service frequency: Weekly
- Train number: 12667 / 12668

On-board services
- Classes: AC 2 tier (2A), AC 3 tier (3A), Sleeper class (SL), Unreserved Compartments (GS) & Luggage cum Break Van (SLRD)
- Disabled access: Disabled access
- Seating arrangements: Yes
- Sleeping arrangements: Yes
- Catering facilities: Yes
- Observation facilities: ICF coach
- Entertainment facilities: No
- Baggage facilities: No

Technical
- Rolling stock: WAP-7 (RPM), WAP-4 (AJJ & ED)
- Track gauge: 1,676 mm (5 ft 6 in)
- Electrification: 25 kV AC, 50 Hz
- Operating speed: 66 km/h (41 mph)
- Rake sharing: Chennai Egmore-Jodhpur Express

The Chennai Egmore–Nagercoil Express is a Superfast train belonging to Southern Railway that runs between Chennai Egmore and Nagercoil Junction in India. It is currently being operated with 12667/12668 train numbers on a weekly basis.

== Service ==
The 12667/Chennai Egmore→Nagercoil Weekly Superfast Express has an average speed of 67 km/h and covers 724 km in 12h 15m. The 12668/Nagercoil–Chennai Egmore Weekly Superfast Express has an average speed of 67 km/h and covers 724 km in 12h 20m.

== Coach composition ==
The train consists of 24 coaches (ICF) as follows:

Loco	1	2	3	4	5	6	7	8	9	10	11	12	13	14	15	16	17	18	19	20	21	22	23	24
	SLRD	GS	GS	A1	B1	B2	B3	B4	B5	B6	S1	S2	S3	S4	S5	S6	S7	S8	S9	S10	S11	GS	GS	SLRD

== See also ==
- Pearl City Express
- Pandian Express
- Pallavan Express
- Ananthapuri Express
- Vaigai Express
- Chendur Express
