= Viramgam–Mahesana section =

Railway line in India

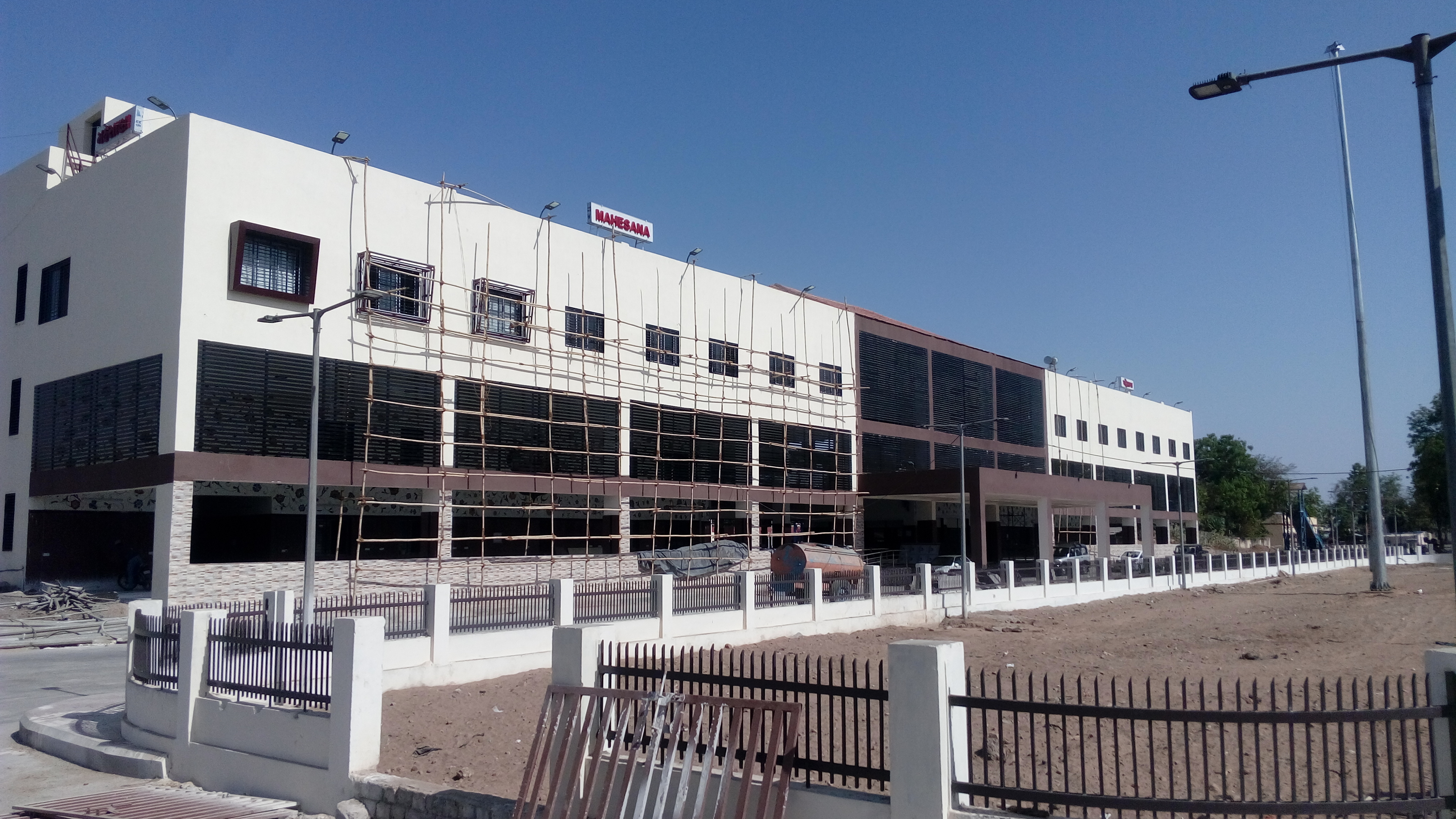
- Mahesana railway station the last stop on Viramgam–Mahesana section

Overview
- Status: Operational
- Owner: Indian Railways
- Locale: Gujarat
- Termini: Viramgam Junction; Mahesana Junction

Service
- Operator: Western Railway

History
- Reopened: 20 July 2005; 21 years ago

Technical
- Track length: 65 km (40 mi)
- Number of tracks: 1
- Track gauge: 1,676 mm (5 ft 6 in)
- Old gauge: 1,000 mm (3 ft 3 3/8 in)

The Viramgam–Mahesana section belongs to Ahmedabad Division of Western Railway.

== History ==
The Government of Bombay and the government of Baroda State opened the Mehsana–Viramgam metre-gauge line in 1891. Viramgam–Mahesana gauge conversion started in 1991. It was re-opened in 2005, after gauge conversion to 5 ft 6 in (1,676 mm) broad gauge.
