= Ajmer–Sealdah Express =

Train in India

Sealdah-Ajmer Express (Erstwhile 2985/2986 Sealdah-Ajmer Express)

Overview
- Service type: Superfast Express
- Locale: Rajasthan, Uttar Pradesh, Bihar, Jharkhand & West Bengal
- First service: 12 September 2009; 16 years ago
- Current operator: North Western Railway

Route
- Termini: Ajmer (AII); Sealdah (SDAH)
- Stops: 21
- Distance travelled: 1,647 km (1,023 mi)
- Average journey time: 26 hours 55 minutes
- Service frequency: Daily
- Train number: 12987 / 12988

On-board services
- Classes: AC 2 Tier, AC 3 Tier, AC 3 Tier Economy, Sleeper Class, General Unreserved
- Seating arrangements: Yes
- Sleeping arrangements: Yes
- Catering facilities: Available
- Observation facilities: Large windows
- Baggage facilities: No
- Other facilities: Below the seats

Technical
- Rolling stock: LHB coach
- Track gauge: 1,676 mm (5 ft 6 in)
- Operating speed: 61.18 km/h (38 mph) average including halts.

The 12987 / 12988 Sealdah-Ajmer Express is a superfast express train belonging to Indian Railways that runs between Ajmer Junction and Sealdah in India.

It operates as train number 12988 from Ajmer Junction to Sealdah and as train number 12987 in the reverse direction.

== History ==
Broad Gauge line reached Jaipur & Ajmer on 1992/1993 year. Kolkata got connected with Jaipur by Howrah-Jodhpur Express(Jodhpur/Bikaner Superfast Express) from Howrah Junction on 3rd July 1995. But the Marwari Association of Bengal wanted another train from Sealdah. Hence 2985/2986 Sealdah - Jaipur/Ajmer Express was started in 1999. At first it was just Sealdah -Jaipur Express & in 2000 became Sealdah - Ajmer Express. The train used to cover 1,764 km (1,096 mi) in 30 hrs 45 mins at 57.36 km/h (36 mph) average speed. But in 2007 after Agra - Achhnera - Bharatpur - Bandikui Line became Broad Gauge, covering 1,647 km (1,023 mi) in 28 hrs 45 mins 57.29 km/h (36 mph) average speed. Eventually when new 5 digit number system started, 2985/2986 was withdrawn & Jaipur-Delhi Sarai Rohilla Double Decker Express was given 12985/12986 number in 2009. To compensate, on 12 September 2009, 2987/2988(later 12987/12988) Sealdah-Ajmer Express was started covering 1,647 km (1,023 mi) in 28 hrs 45 mins 57.29 km/h (36 mph) average speed.

== Current service ==
The 12987 Sealdah-Ajmer Superfast Express covers the distance of 1,647 km (1,023 mi) in 26 hrs 45 mins at 62 km/h (39 mph) average speed and in 27 h 05 min at 60.84 km/h (38 mph) average speed as 12988 Ajmer-Sealdah Superfast Express.

As the average speed of the train is above 55 km/h (34 mph), as per Indian Railways rules, its fare includes a Superfast surcharge.

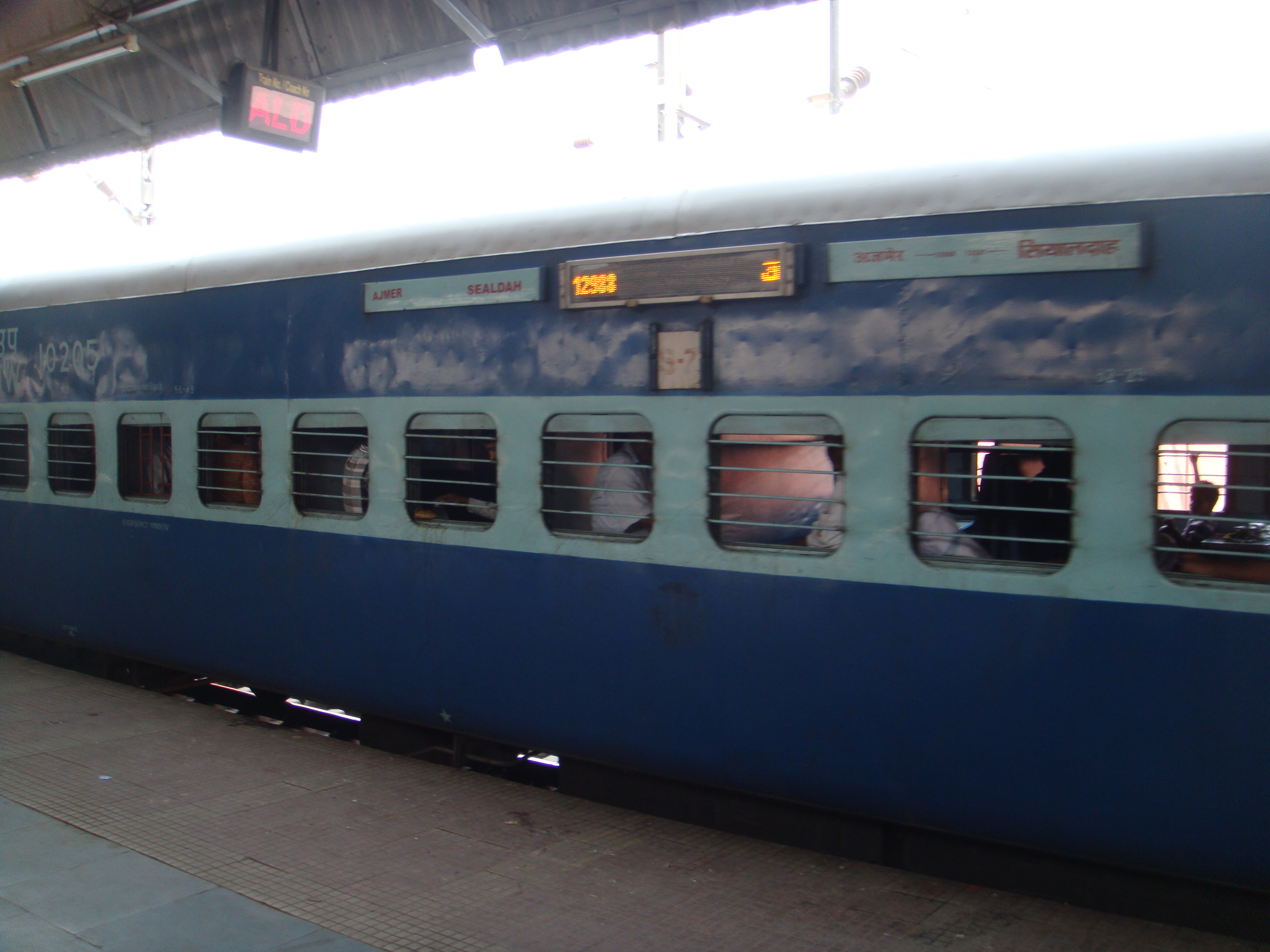
12987 Sealdah–Ajmer Superfast Express – Sleeper coach

== Route and halts ==
The 12988 / 12987 Ajmer–Sealdah Superfast Express runs from Ajmer Junction via Madar Junction, Kishangarh, Jaipur Junction, Bharatpur Junction, Achhnera Junction, Agra Fort, Tundla Junction, Etawah Junction, Kanpur Central, Prayagraj Junction, Pt. Deen Dayal Upadhyay Jn., Bhabua Road, Sasaram Junction, Dehri-on-Sone, Gaya Junction, Dhanbad Junction, Asansol, Durgapur & Bardhaman Junction to Sealdah.

== Traction ==
Both trains are hauled by a Howrah Loco Shed-based WAP-7 electric locomotive from Ajmer Junction to Sealdah, and vice versa.

== Coach composition ==
- 2 AC II Tier
- 6 AC III Tier
- 2 AC III Tier Economy
- 1 PC – Pantry car
- 5 Sleeper coaches
- 4 General
- 2 End-on Generators

Loco	1	2	3	4	5	6	7	8	9	10	11	12	13	14	15	16	17	18	19	20	21	22
	EOG	GEN	GEN	S1	S2	S3	S4	S5	M1	M2	PC	B6	B5	B4	B3	B2	B1	A2	A1	GEN	GEN	EOG
