= Chhapi railway station =

Railway station in Gujarat, India

Chhapi railway station

General information
- Location: Chhapi, Gujarat; India
- Coordinates: 24°02′01″N 72°24′01″E
- Elevation: 168 metres (551 ft)
- System: Indian Railway Station
- Owner: Ministry of Railways, Indian Railways
- Operator: Western Railway
- Line: Jaipur - Ahmedabad line
- Platforms: 2
- Tracks: 2

Construction
- Structure type: Standard (On Ground)
- Parking: No

Other information
- Status: Functioning
- Station code: CHP
- Zone(s): Western Railway
- Division(s): Ahmedabad
Location
- Location within India Location within Gujarat

Chhapi railway station is a railway station in Banaskantha district, Gujarat, India on the Western line of the Western railway network. Chhapi railway station is 16 km far away from Palanpur Junction. This railway station is located in village named Chhapi

== Nearby Stations ==
Umardashi is nearest railway station towards Palanpur Junction, whereas Dharewada is nearest railway station towards Ahmedabad Junction.

== Major Trains ==
Following Express and Superfast trains halt at Chhapi railway station in both direction:

- 19707/08 Bandra Terminus - Jaipur Amrapur Aravali Express
- 12989/90 Dadar - Ajmer Superfast Express
