= Kanodar =

- city
- Location in Gujarat, India Kanodar (India)
- Coordinates: 24°05′23.8″N 72°23′35″E
- Country: India
- State: Gujarat
- District: Banaskantha
- Elevation: 170 m (560 ft)

Population (2001)
  - Total: 13,000

Languages
  - Official: Gujarati, Hindi
- Time zone: UTC+5:30 (IST)
- Postal code: 385520
- Vehicle registration: GJ
- Website: gujaratindia.com

Kanodar is a census town in Banaskantha district in the Indian state of Gujarat. Kanodar is situated on Palanpur-Ahmedabad State Highway 41.

== Demographics ==
The population is split evenly between males and females. The literacy rate of Kanodar city is 99.74 % higher than state average of 78.03 %. In Kanodar, male literacy is around 98.72 % while female literacy rate is 99.9 %.

== Education ==
There are four Gujarati medium primary schools, one Gujarati secondary school named S.K.M High School & D.B.W.T.Higher Secondary school and two English medium primary school named Jaffery English Medium school and Rangoli English medium school. Susan secondary and higher secondary school.

== Economy ==
Kanodar's economy has historically been known for hand loom production and textiles especially by Muman(Momin) weavers; more recently, they have found a niche market in reconditioning jeeps.
