= Kazipet–Hadapsar Express =

Train in India

Kazipet Hadapsar Express
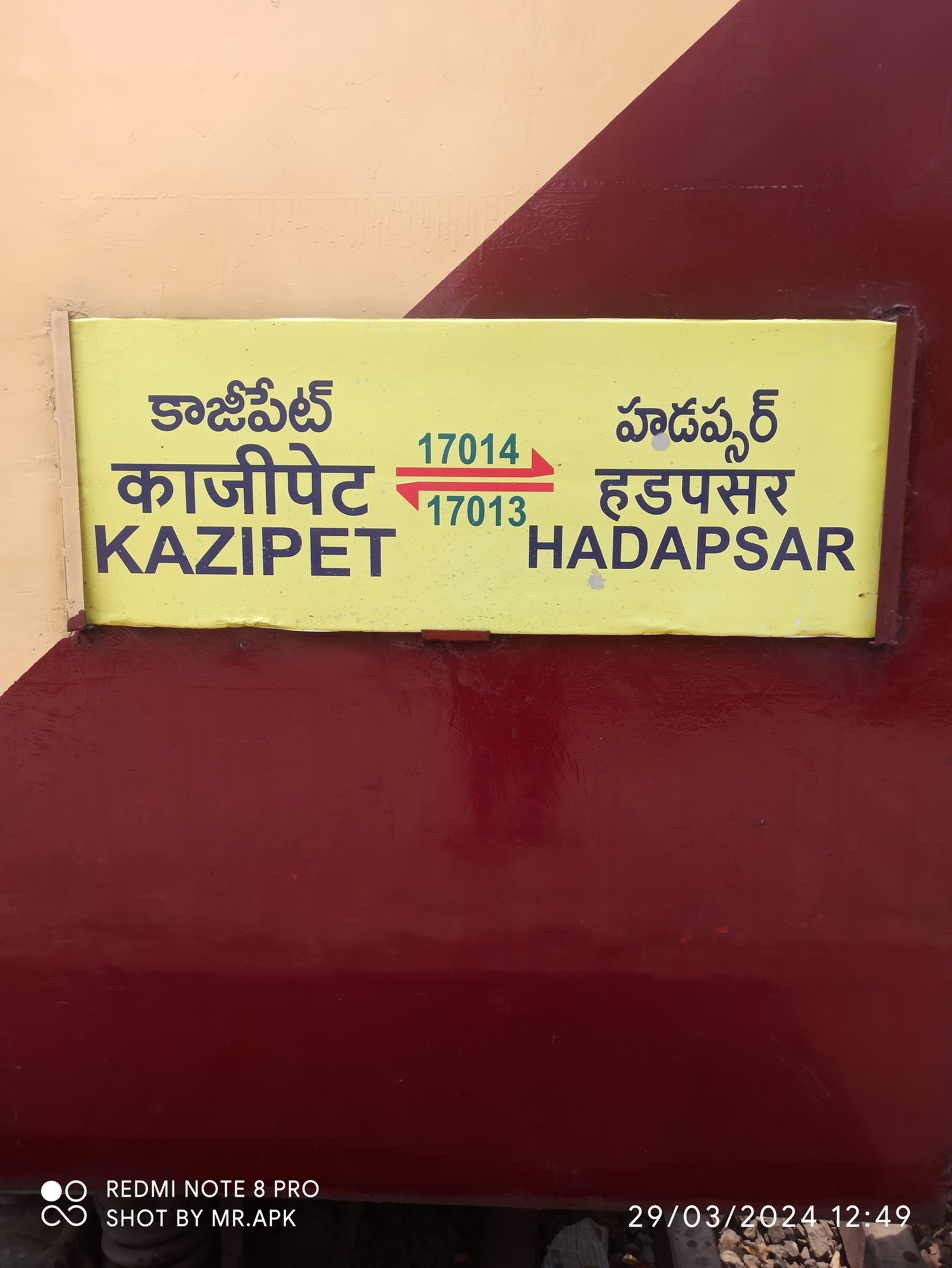
- Kazipet - Hadapsar Express train board.

Overview
- Service type: Express
- Locale: Telangana, Karnataka & Maharashtra
- Current operator: South Central Railway

Route
- Termini: Kazipet (KZJ); Hadapsar (HDP)
- Stops: 18
- Distance travelled: 772 km (480 mi)
- Average journey time: 16 hours 10 minutes
- Service frequency: Tri-weekly.
- Train number: 17013 / 17014

On-board services
- Classes: AC 2 Tier, AC 3 Tier, Sleeper Class, General Unreserved
- Seating arrangements: Yes
- Sleeping arrangements: Yes
- Catering facilities: On-board catering, E-catering
- Observation facilities: Large windows
- Baggage facilities: No
- Other facilities: Below the seats

Technical
- Rolling stock: ICF coach
- Track gauge: 1,676 mm (5 ft 6 in)
- Operating speed: 110 km/h (68 mph) maximum, 47 km/h (29 mph) average including halts.
Route map
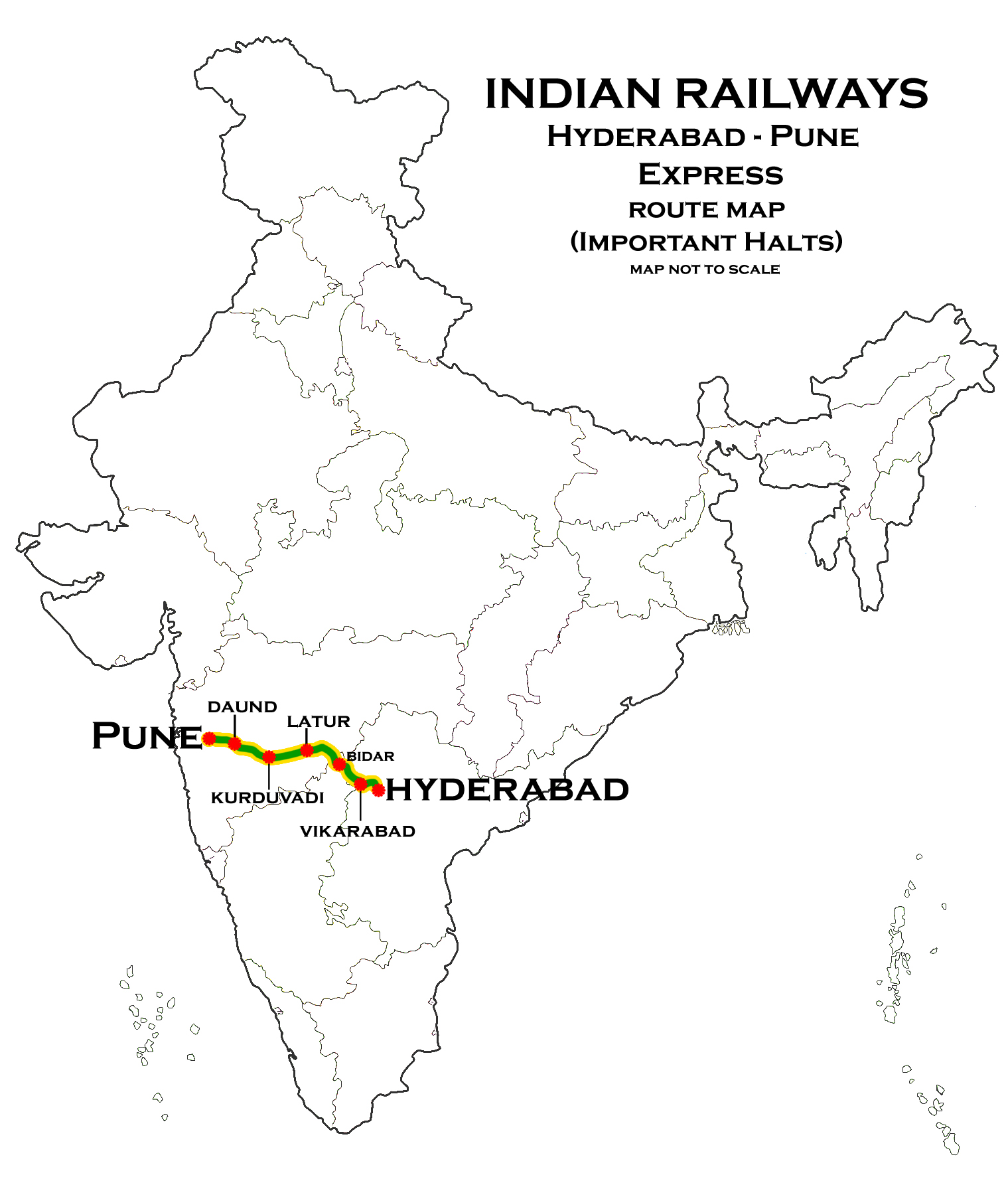

The 17013 / 7014 Kazipet–Hadapsar Express is an express train belonging to Indian Railways - South Central Railway zone that runs between Kazipet and Hadapsar (Pune) which is 6 km from Pune Junction in India.

It operates as train number 17014 from Kazipet Junction to Hadapsar and as train number 17013 in the reverse direction. Earlier It ran between Hyderabad Deccan and Pune Junction but due to space issues, it was terminated to Hadapsar. From 9 October 2023, 17013/14 was Extended to Kazipet Junction, changing the terminal from Hyderabad deccan, instead provided halt at Secunderabad Railway station.

== Coaches ==
The 17013/14 Kazipet Hadapsar Express presently has 2 AC 2 tier, 2 AC 3 tier, 10 Sleeper Class, 4 Unreserved/General & 2 Seating cum Luggage Rake coaches.

As with most train services in India, Coach Composition may be amended at the discretion of Indian Railways depending on demand.

== Service ==
The 17014 Kazipet Hadapsar Express covers the distance of 772 km (480 mi) in 16 hours 35 mins averaging 47.35 km/h (29 mph) & in 15 hrs 15 mins as 17013 Hadapsar Kazipet Express averaging 51.47 km/h (32 mph).

As the average speed of the train is below 55 km/h (34 mph), as per Indian Railway rules, its fare does not include an express surcharge.

== Routeing ==
The 17013/14 Kazipet Hadapsar Express runs via Secunderabad Junction, Vikarabad Junction, Bidar, Latur, Daund Junction to Hadapsar.

=== Route ===
Station code	Station Name	Distance (km)
HDP	Hadapsar	0
DD	Daund	69.4
KWV	Kurduvadi Junction	177.5
BTW	Barshi City	214.9
UMD	Dharashiv	250.9
LUR	Latur	329.9
LTRR	Latur Road Jn	362.9
UDGR	Udgir	395.7
BHLK	Bhalki	439.0
BIDR	Bidar	476.3
ZB	Zahirabad	508.1
VKB	Vikarabad Junction	567.6
LPI	Lingampalli	616.2
BMT	Begumpet	634.8
SC	Secunderabad Junction	639.9
BG	Bhongir	686.5
ZN	Jangaon	723.4
KZJ	Kazipet Junction	772.3

== Traction ==
As the route is fully electrified, a Lalaguda Loco Shed-based WAP-7 or Vijayawada Loco Shed-based WAP-4 electric locomotive on its entire journey.

== Timetable ==
No. 17014 Kazipet Hadapsar Express leaves Kazipet Junction every Monday, Thursday & Saturday at 18:15 hrs IST and reaches Hadapsar at 10:50 hrs IST the next day.

No. 17013 Hadapsar Kazipet Express leaves Hadapsar every Tuesday, Friday & Sunday at 15:30 hrs IST and reaches Kazipet Junction at 06:45 hrs IST the next day.

== Gallery ==
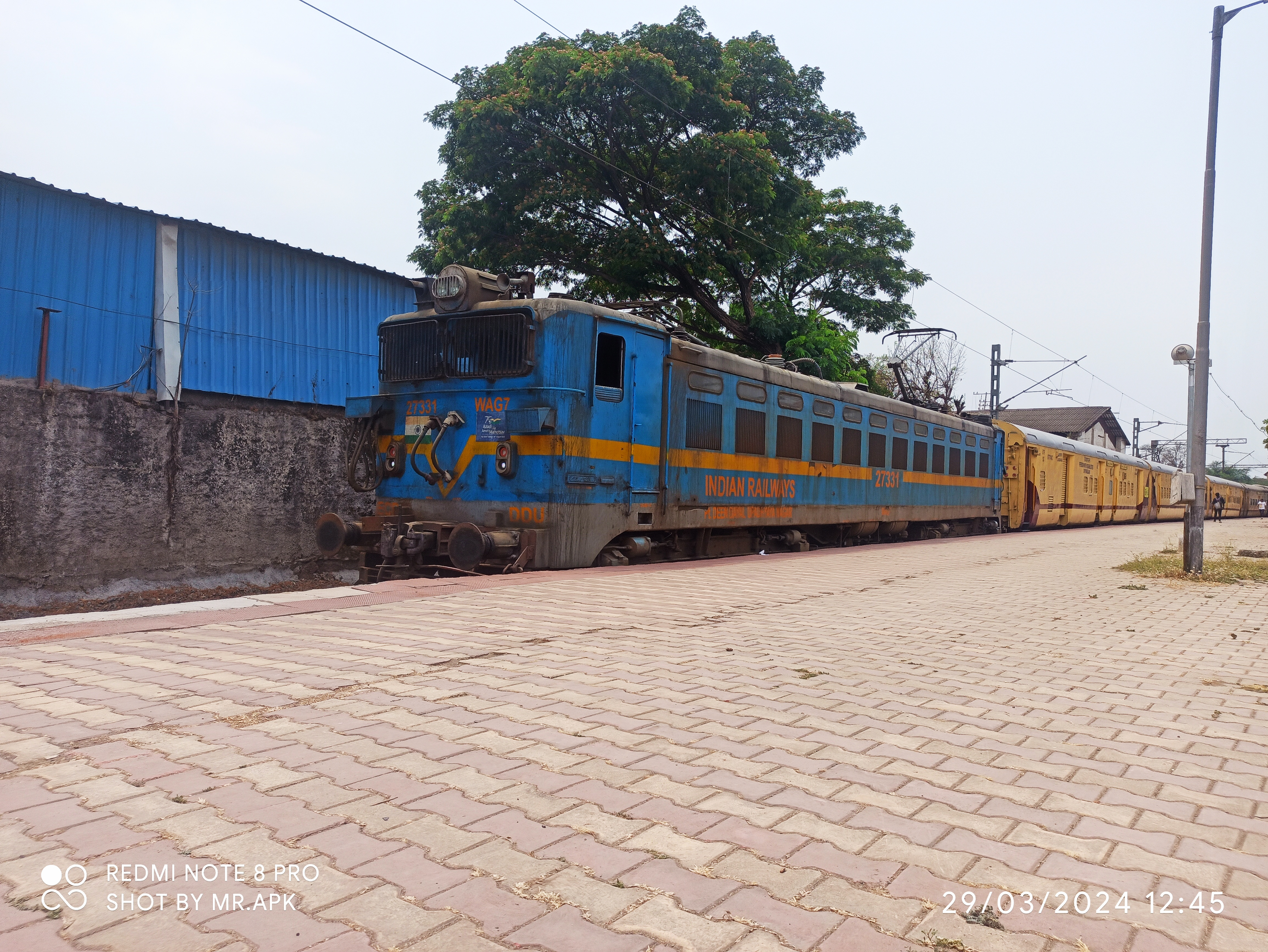
17013 about to depart from its source station - HDP, hauled by DDU based WAG-7 locomotive.

17013 arrived Kazipet Junction Railway Station led by Lalaguda based WAG-9 31178

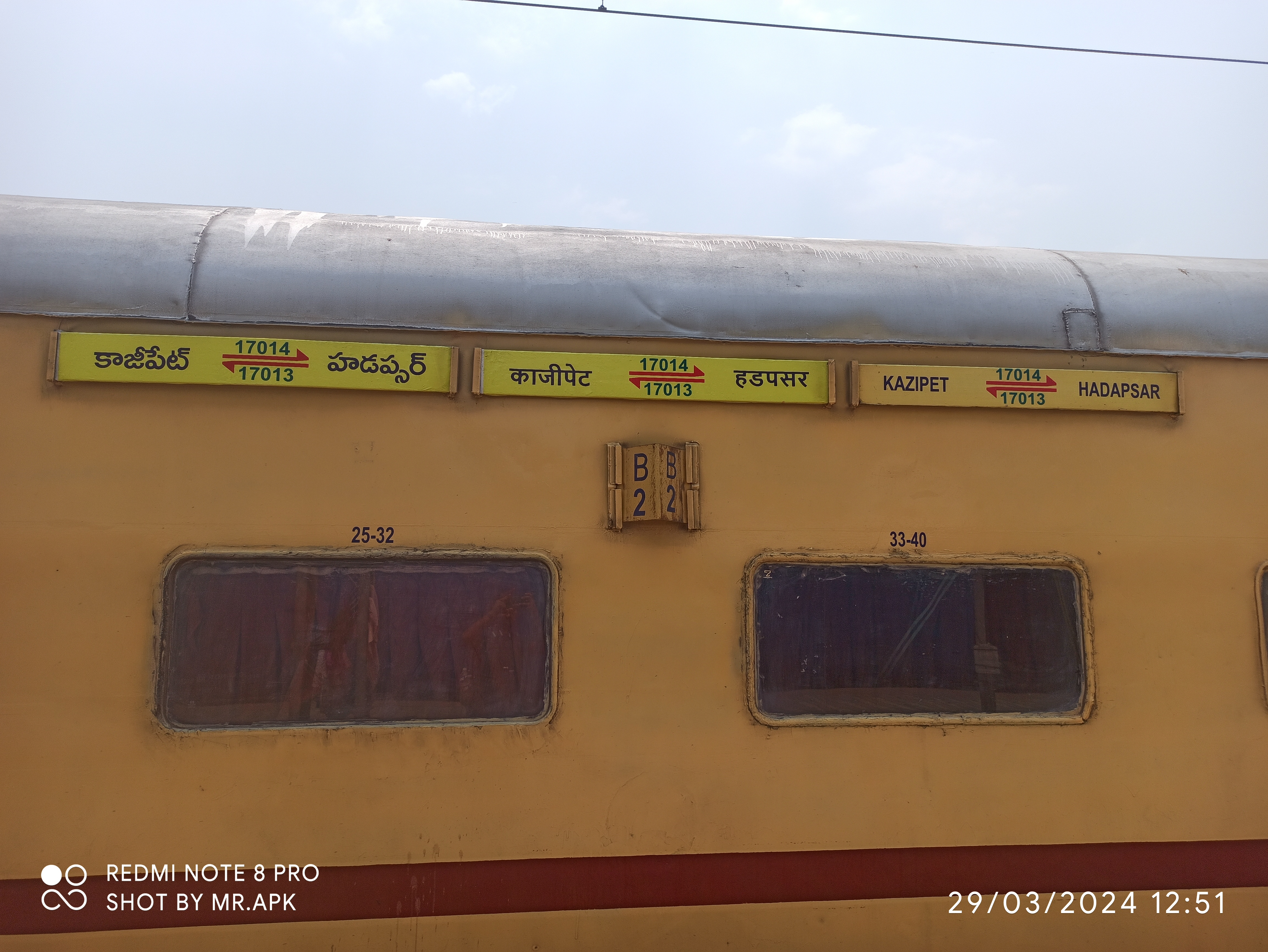
Kazipet-Hadapsar Express Trainboard in 3 languages
