= Aithor =

Coordinates: 23.7684671°N 72.3951925°E

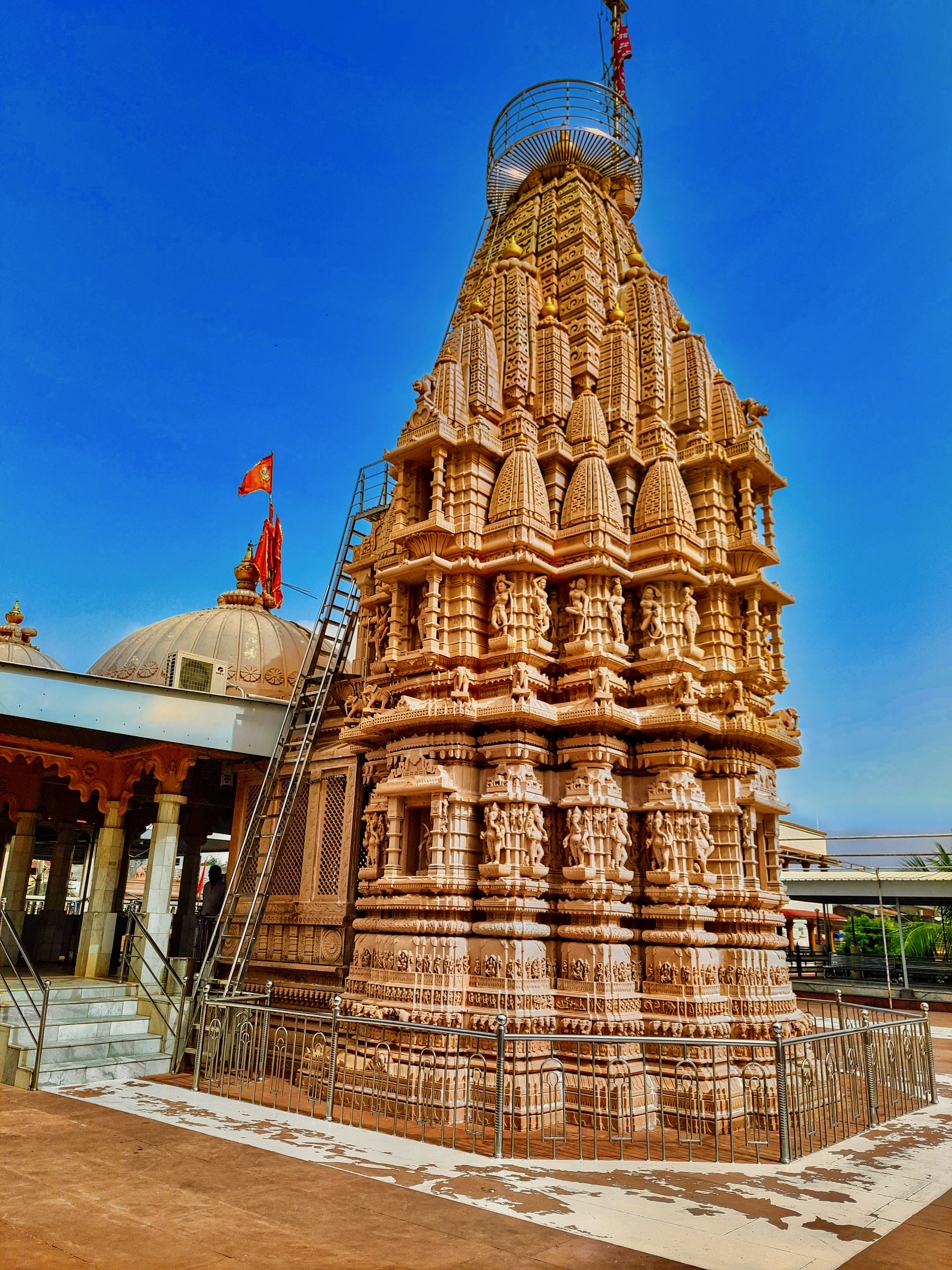
Ganesha temple, Aithor

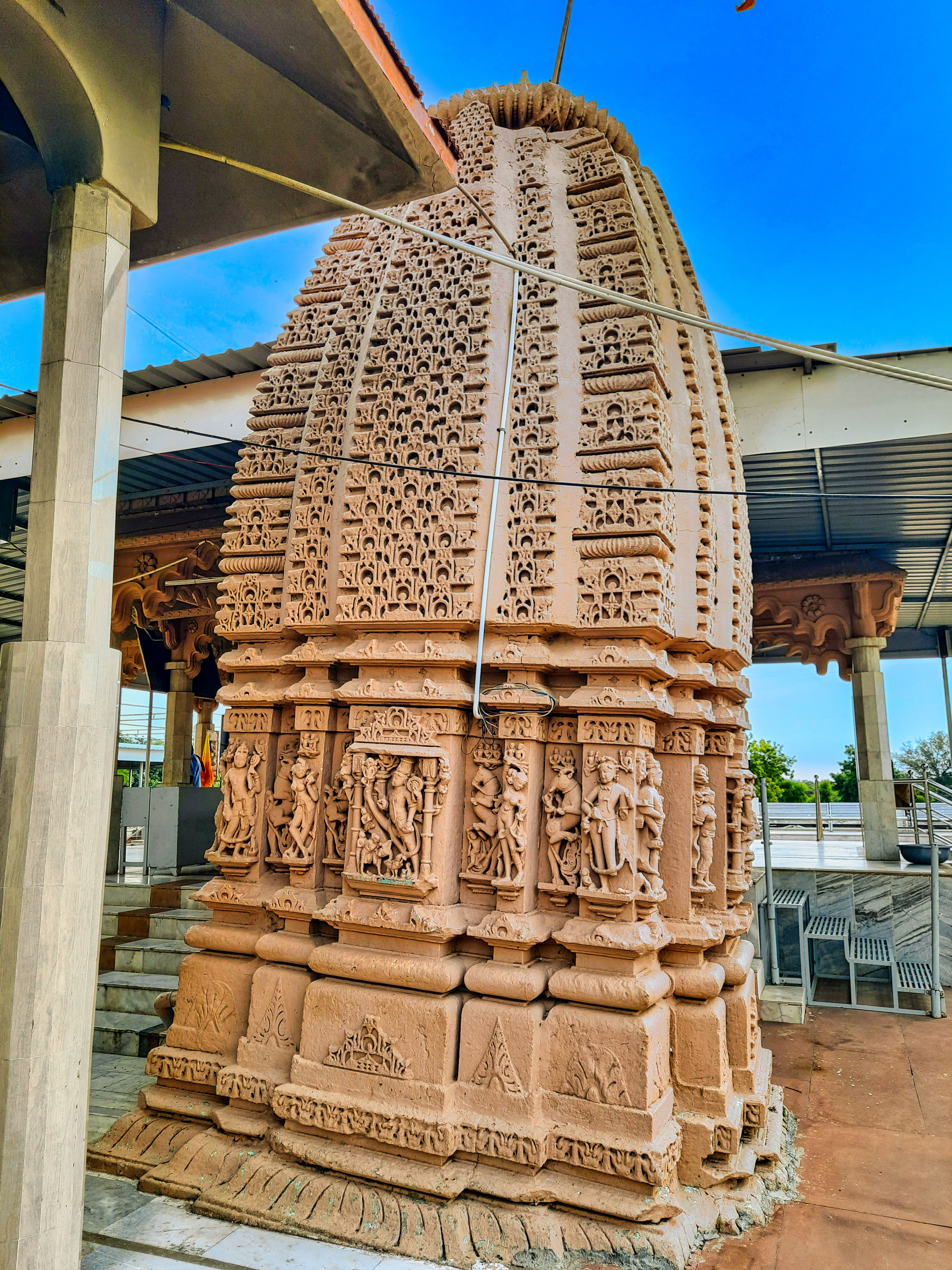
Trivikrama avatar artwork (middle main frame) in the Vishnu temple, Aithor

Aithor is a village in Unjha Taluka of Mehsana district, Gujarat, India.

== Places of interest ==
There is a Vishnu temple located in compound of Ganesha temple. The shrine is considered more than 900 years old. The annual fair is organized on the third to fifth days of bright half of Chaitra month of Hindu calendar (Chaitra Sud 3, 4, 5). There is an ancient stepwell and Ram well in the village.

Opposite the temple of Ganesha, the statues of various forms of Lord Vishnu are different from the various parts of the ancient Vishnu temple. There is a quadrangular statue located in the triangle on both sides of the verandah in the south of Gokh in the Gokh of the temple and the Chakrabhuj statue raised in the horoscope, and the historical document is determined by the evidence that this temple is Lord Vishnu.

== Amenities ==
There are two government operated schools in the village proving education until higher secondary level. The village has Primary Health Centre (PHC).

== Economy ==
People are mostly engaged in agriculture and animal husbandry. They sell their products to Unjha Market Yard and local milk co-operative society. Several people works in nearby cities; Unjha and Mehsana.
