= Hadapsar railway station =

Railway station in Pune, India

Hadapsar हडपसर

General information
- Location: Pune; India
- Coordinates: 18.5269°N 73.9279°E
- Elevation: 554.00 metres (1,817.59 ft)
- Owner: Indian Railways
- Lines: Mumbai Dadar–Solapur section Mumbai–Chennai line
- Platforms: 3
- Tracks: 5

Construction
- Parking: Yes

Other information
- Station code: HDP
- Fare zone: Central Railway zone
Location

Hadapsar railway station is located in Hadapsar, a suburb of Pune in Maharashtra. There are plans to start long-distance trains from this station as there is no space for new trains at Pune Junction. There is also a plan to start suburban trains on Pune–Daund section. This station will be a major station for Pune–Daund suburban trains. The station may also get Pune Metro in Line 4.

== Upgrade plans ==
The central railways has plans for land acquisition near this station. Plans are to increase parking space, approach roads to the station, passenger lounges and other facilities. The proposal includes adding 40 acres of land adjacent to the station for the construction of dedicated parking, station building which will include lounges, reservation center, and waiting rooms. There are about 150 long-distance trains operating from Pune Junction. Some of these can originate and terminate at Hadapsar which will reduce load on Pune Junction. Approximately ₹ 400 crores are required for land acquisition and ₹ 350 crores are required for actual development of this station.

== Trains ==
Origin & terminate here

1. Muzaffarpur - Hadapsar (Pune) AC Express (this train operating as a special will have its first scheduled train departure on 10 December 2025)
2. Hadapsar (Pune) - Kazipet Express Via Latur, Secunderabad
3. Hadapsar (Pune) - Nanded Express (From 26 January 2026 this train will terminate here. Currently this train terminates at Pune.)
4. Hadapsar (Pune) - Jodhpur Express
5. Hadapsar (Pune) - Rewa weekly Express
6. Hadapsar - Solapur MEMU Express (This train has one-way departure from here heading towards Solapur. The return train terminates at Pune.)

Have stop at Hadapsar (Pune)

1. Pune – Baramati Passenger
2. Pune – Baramati DEMU
3. Pune – Daund DEMU
4. Pune – Daund DEMU
5. Pune – Daund DEMU
6. Pune - Daund Fast DEMU
7. Pune – Solapur MEMU Express
8. Solapur - Pune MEMU Express (This train has one-way halt over here heading towards Pune. The return train originates from here.)

Special trains

1. Hadapsar (Pune) - Harangul special (This train currently originates and terminates at Pune but it will originate & terminate here from 26 January 2026.)
2. Hadapsar (Pune) - Danapur Chat pooja special (This train will have last departure on 1 December 2025.)
3. Hadapsar (Pune) - VGL Jhansi special (This train will have last departure on 27 November 2025.)
4. Hadapsar (Pune) - VGL Jhansi superfast special (This train will have last departure on 23 November 2025.)
5. Hadapsar (Pune) - HS Nanded weekly special (This train will have last departure on 25 November 2025.)

== See also ==
- Pune Junction
- Shivaji Nagar
- Khadki
- Pune Suburban Railway
- Kazipet–Hadapsar Express
