= Chennai Egmore–Jodhpur Express =

Train in India

Tambaram–Jodhpur Express

Overview
- Service type: Superfast
- First service: 1 January 2002; 24 years ago
- Current operator: Southern Railway

Route
- Termini: Tambaram (TBM); Jodhpur (JU)
- Stops: 27
- Distance travelled: 2,378 km (1,478 mi)
- Average journey time: 41 hours 15 minutes
- Service frequency: Weekly (Note: Runs one day in a week for every direction.)
- Train number: 22663 / 22664

On-board services
- Classes: AC 2 Tier, AC 3 Tier, Sleeper Class, General Unreserved
- Seating arrangements: No
- Sleeping arrangements: Yes
- Catering facilities: Available
- Observation facilities: Large windows
- Baggage facilities: No
- Other facilities: Below the seats

Technical
- Rolling stock: LHB coach
- Track gauge: 1,676 mm (5 ft 6 in)
- Operating speed: 58 km/h (36 mph) average including halts.
Route map
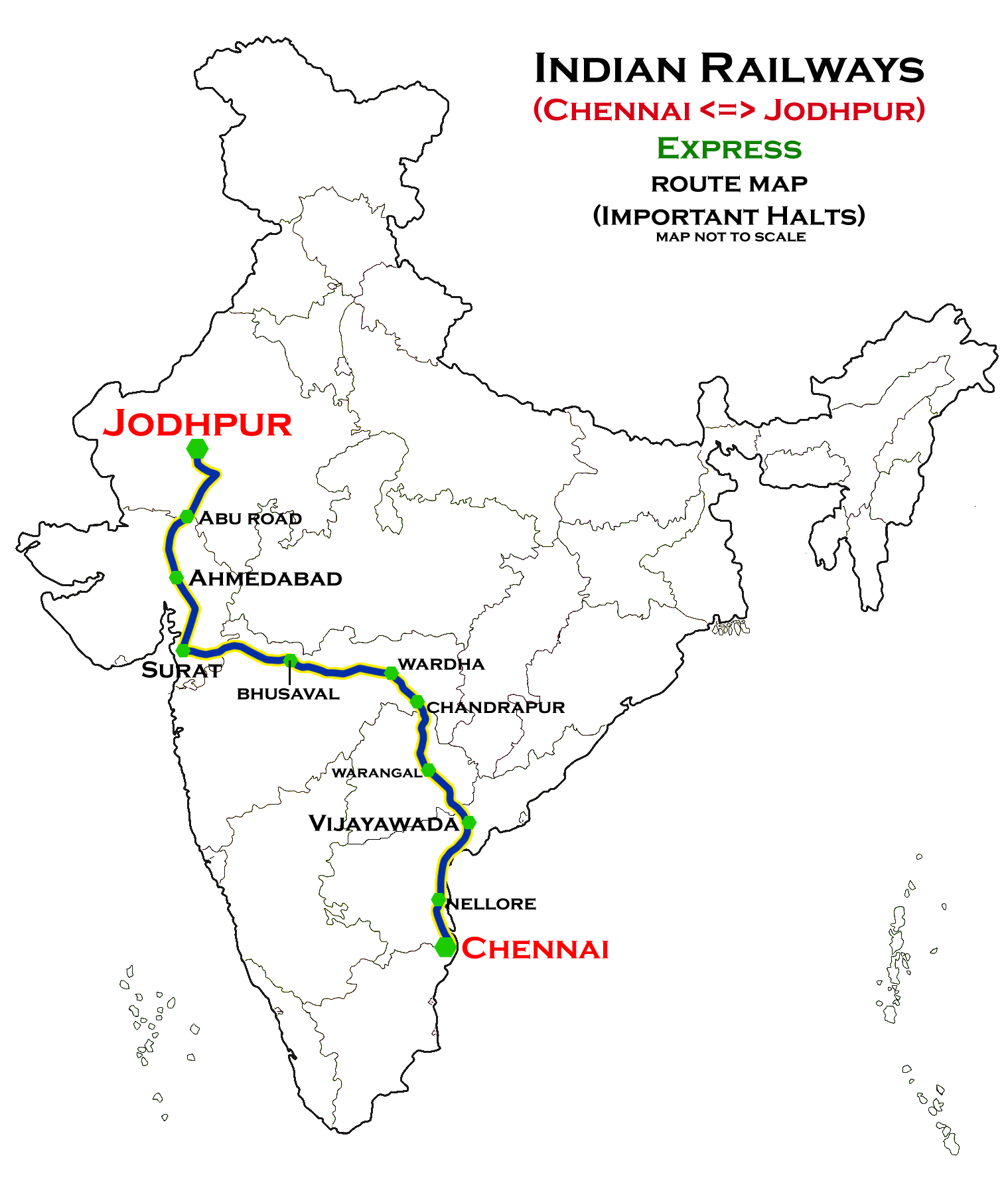

The 22663 / 22664 Tambaram–Jodhpur Express is a superfast train belonging to Southern Railway zone that runs between Tambaram and Jodhpur in India. It is currently being operated with 22663/22664 train numbers on a weekly basis.

== Service ==
The 22663/Chennai Egmore–Jodhpur Express has an average speed of 55 km/h and covers 2352 km in 42h 45m. The 22664/Jodhpur–Chennai Egmore Expresshas averages speed of 55 km/h and covers 2352 km in 42h 45m.

== Route and halts ==
The important halts of the train are:

- Tambaram
- Chennai Egmore
- Tiruvottiyur
- Ongole
- Vijayawada Junction
- Khammam
- Balharshah Junction
- Wardha Junction
- Badnera Junction
- Akola Junction
- Bhusaval Junction
- Nandurbar
- Surat
- Vadodara Junction
- Ahmedabad Junction
- Abu Road
- Marwar Junction
- Pali Marwar
- Jodhpur

== Traction ==
Both trains are hauled by a Royapuram Loco Shed-based WAP-7 electric locomotive from Tambaram to Jodhpur and vice versa.

== Coach composition ==
The train has standard LHB rakes with max speed of 130 kmph. The train consists of 22 coaches:

- 1 AC Two Tier
- 9 AC Three Tier
- 6 Sleeper coaches
- 4 General Unreserved
- 2 Seating cum Luggage Rake

== See also ==
- Chennai Egmore railway station
- Jodhpur Junction railway station
- Chennai Egmore–Nagercoil Weekly Superfast Express
