= Rajkot–Delhi Sarai Rohilla Weekly Superfast Express =

Train in India

Overview
- Service type: Superfast
- First service: 30 January 2014; 12 years ago
- Current operator: Western Railway zone

Route
- Termini: Rajkot Junction (RJT); Delhi Sarai Rohilla (DEE)
- Stops: 21
- Distance travelled: 1,107 km (688 mi)
- Average journey time: 19 hrs 30 mins
- Service frequency: Weekly (Note: Runs one day in a week for every direction.)
- Train number: 20913/20914

On-board services
- Classes: AC 2 tier, AC 3 tier, Sleeper class, General Unreserved
- Seating arrangements: Yes
- Sleeping arrangements: Yes
- Catering facilities: On-board catering E-catering
- Observation facilities: LHB coach
- Entertainment facilities: No
- Baggage facilities: No
- Other facilities: Below the seats

Technical
- Rolling stock: 2
- Track gauge: 1,676 mm (5 ft 6 in)
- Operating speed: 56 km/h (35 mph), including halts

The 20913/20914 Rajkot–Delhi Sarai Rohilla Weekly Superfast Express is a Superfast train belonging to Western Railway zone that runs between Rajkot Junction and Delhi Sarai Rohilla in India. It is currently being operated with 20913/20914 train numbers on a weekly basis.

== Coach composition ==
The train has standard ICF rakes with a maximum speed of 110 km/h. The train consists of 23 coaches:

- 1 AC II Tier
- 5 AC III Tier
- 11 Sleeper coaches
- 4 General Unreserved
- 2 Seating cum Luggage Rake

== Service ==
The 20913/Rajkot–Delhi Sarai Rohilla Weekly Superfast Express has an average speed of 57 km/h and covers 1107 km in 19 hrs 20 mins.

The 20914/Delhi Sarai Rohilla–Rajkot Weekly Superfast Express has an average speed of 56 km/h and covers 1107 km in 19 hrs 40 mins.

== Route and halts ==
The important halts of the train are:

- Rajkot Junction
- Surendranagar Junction
- Mahesana Junction
- Abu Road
- Marwar Junction
- Ajmer Junction
- Jaipur Junction
- Dausa
- Alwar Junction
- Rewari Junction
- Gurgaon
- Delhi Cantonment
- Delhi Sarai Rohilla

== Schedule ==
Train number	Station code	Departure station	Departure time	Departure day	Arrival station	Arrival time	Arrival day
20913	RJT	Rajkot Junction	14:50 PM	Thu	Delhi Sarai Rohilla	10:10 AM	Fri
20914	DEE	Delhi Sarai Rohilla	13:20 PM	Fri	Rajkot Junction	09:00 AM	Sat

== Traction ==
Both trains are hauled by a Vatva Loco Shed-based WDM-3A or WDM-3D diesel locomotive from Rajkot to Delhi and vice versa.

== Rake sharing ==
The train shares its rake with 22937/22938 Rajkot–Rewa Superfast Express.

== See also ==
- Delhi Sarai Rohilla railway station
- Rajkot Junction railway station
- Rajkot–Rewa Superfast Express
