= Sabarmati–Ajmer Intercity Express =

Train in India

Sabarmati-Ajmer Intercity Express
Overview
- Service type: Intercity Express
- First service: 22 April 2013; 11 years ago
- Current operator(s): Western Railway

Route
- Termini: Sabarmati (SBIB); Ajmer Junction (AII)
- Stops: 12
- Distance travelled: 492 km (306 mi)
- Average journey time: 9 hours 25 mins
- Service frequency: Daily
- Train number(s): 19411 / 19412

On-board services
- Class(es): General Unreserved, AC Chair Car
- Seating arrangements: Yes
- Sleeping arrangements: Yes
- Auto-rack arrangements: Overhead racks
- Catering facilities: On-board catering, E-catering
- Observation facilities: Large windows
- Baggage facilities: No
- Other facilities: Below the seats

Technical
- Rolling stock: LHB coach
- Track gauge: 1,676 mm (5 ft 6 in)
- Operating speed: 47 km/h (29 mph) average including halts.
Route map
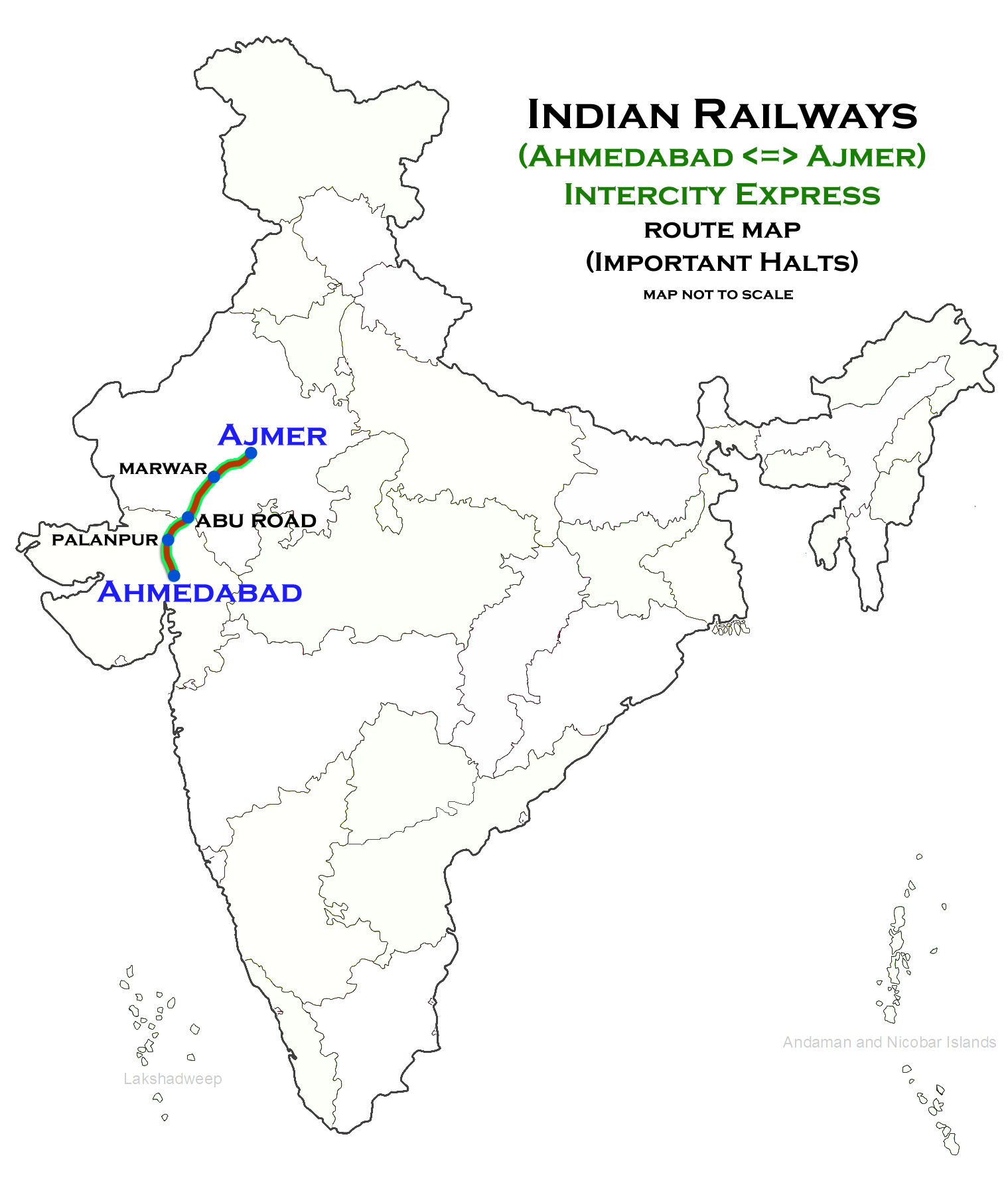

The 19411 / 19412 Sabarmati–Ajmer Intercity Express is an intercity express train belonging to Indian Railways Western Railway zone that runs between Sabarmati in (Ahmedabad) and Ajmer Junction in India.

It operates as train number 19411 from Sabarmati to Ajmer Junction and as train number 19412 in the reverse direction serving the states of Gujarat and Rajasthan.

== Coaches ==
The Sabarmati–Ajmer Intercity Express has one AC chair car, 11 general unreserved and two SLR (seating with luggage rake) coaches. It does not carry a pantry car coach.
