= Ahmedabad–Jammu Tawi Express =

Train in India

Sabarmati–SMVD Katra Express

Overview
- Service type: Express
- Status: Operating
- Locale: Gujarat, Rajasthan, Haryana, Punjab & Jammu and Kashmir
- Current operator: Western Railway

Route
- Termini: Sabarmati (SBIB); SMVD Katra (SVDK)
- Stops: 54
- Distance travelled: 1,569 km (975 mi)
- Average journey time: 32 hours 30 minutes
- Service frequency: Daily
- Train number: 19223 / 19224

On-board services
- Classes: AC 2 Tier, AC 3 Tier, Sleeper Class, General Unreserved
- Seating arrangements: Yes
- Sleeping arrangements: Yes
- Catering facilities: On-board catering, E-catering
- Observation facilities: Large windows
- Baggage facilities: No
- Other facilities: Below the seats

Technical
- Rolling stock: LHB coach
- Track gauge: 1,676 mm (5 ft 6 in)
- Operating speed: 110 km/h (68 mph) maximum, 48 km/h (30 mph) average including halts.
Route map

The 19223 / 19224 Sabarmati–SMVD Katra Express is an express train belonging to Indian Railways that runs between Sabarmati and Shri Mata Vaishno Devi Katra in India.

It operates as train number 19223 from Sabarmati to Shri Mata Vaishno Devi Katra and as train number 19224 in the reverse direction.

== Coaches ==
19223/19224 Sabarmati–SMVD Katra Express presently has 1 AC II tier, 4 AC III tier, 10 Sleeper class and 6 General Unreserved coaches.

As with most train services in India, coach composition may be amended at the discretion of Indian Railways depending on demand.

== Service ==
19223 Sabarmati–SMVD Katra Express covers the distance of 1569 kilometres in 32 hours 30 mins (48 km/h) and in 31 hours 50 mins (49 km/h) as 19224 SMVD Katra–Sabarmati Express.

It reverses direction once during its journey at Firozpur Cantonment.

== Traction ==
It is hauled by a Vatva Loco Shed based WAP-4 electric locomotive.

== Routeing ==
The train runs from Sabarmati BG via Palanpur Junction, Abu Road, Marwar Junction, Jodhpur Junction, Merta Road Junction, Nagaur, Bikaner Junction, Suratgarh Junction, Hanumangarh Junction, Bathinda Junction, Firozpur Cantonment, Sultanpur Lodhi, Kapurthala, Jalandhar City, Pathankot, Jammu Tawi to SMVD Katra.

== Time table ==
- 19223 Sabarmati–SMVD Katra Express leaves Sabarmati daily and reaches SMVD Katra the next day.
- 19224 SMVD Katra–Sabarmati Express leaves SMVD Katra daily and reaches Sabarmati the next day.
