= Dadar–Ajmer Superfast Express =

Train in India

Ajmer–Dadar Express

Overview
- Service type: Superfast
- Locale: Rajasthan, Gujarat & Maharashtra
- Current operator: North Western Railway

Route
- Termini: Ajmer Junction (AII); Dadar (DDR)
- Stops: 20
- Distance travelled: 978 km (608 mi)
- Average journey time: 16 hours 45 minutes
- Service frequency: Tri-weekly
- Train number: 12989 / 12990

On-board services
- Classes: AC 2 tier, AC 3 tier, Sleeper class, General Unreserved
- Seating arrangements: Yes
- Sleeping arrangements: Yes
- Catering facilities: On-board catering, E-catering
- Observation facilities: Large windows
- Baggage facilities: Available
- Other facilities: Below the seats

Technical
- Rolling stock: LHB coach
- Track gauge: 1,676 mm (5 ft 6 in)
- Operating speed: 130 km/h (81 mph) maximum, 58 km/h (36 mph) average including halts.

The 12989 / 12990 Dadar–Ajmer Superfast Express is a Superfast Express train belonging to Indian Railways – North Western Railway zone that runs between Ajmer Junction and Dadar in India.

It operates as train number 12990 from Ajmer Junction to Dadar and as train number 12989 in the reverse direction, serving the state of Rajasthan, Gujarat & Maharashtra.

It is one of two trains that connect Ajmer to Mumbai, the other train being the Ajmer–Bandra Terminus Express.

== Coaches ==
The 12989 / 12990 Ajmer–Dadar Express presently has LHB coaches which are 2 AC II tier, 3 AC III tier, 13 Sleeper class, 4 General Unreserved & 2 SLR (EoG cum Seating Luggage Rake) coaches. It does not have a pantry car.

As is customary with most train services in India, coach composition may be amended at the discretion of Indian Railways depending on demand.

== Service ==
The 12990 Ajmer–Dadar Express covers the distance of 976 kilometres in 17 hours 20 mins (56.31 km/h) and in 17 hours 30 mins as 12989 Dadar–Ajmer Express (55.77 km/h).

As the average speed of the train is above 55 km/h, as per Indian Railways rules, its fare includes a Superfast surcharge.

== Routeing ==
The 12990 / 12989 Ajmer–Dadar Express runs from Ajmer Junction via Marwar Junction, Falna, Abu Road, Palanpur, Ahmedabad Junction, Vadodara Junction, Surat, Borivali to Dadar.

== Traction ==
As the route is fully electrified, it is hauled by a Vadodara Loco Shed based WAP-7 electric locomotive on its entire journey.

== Gallery ==
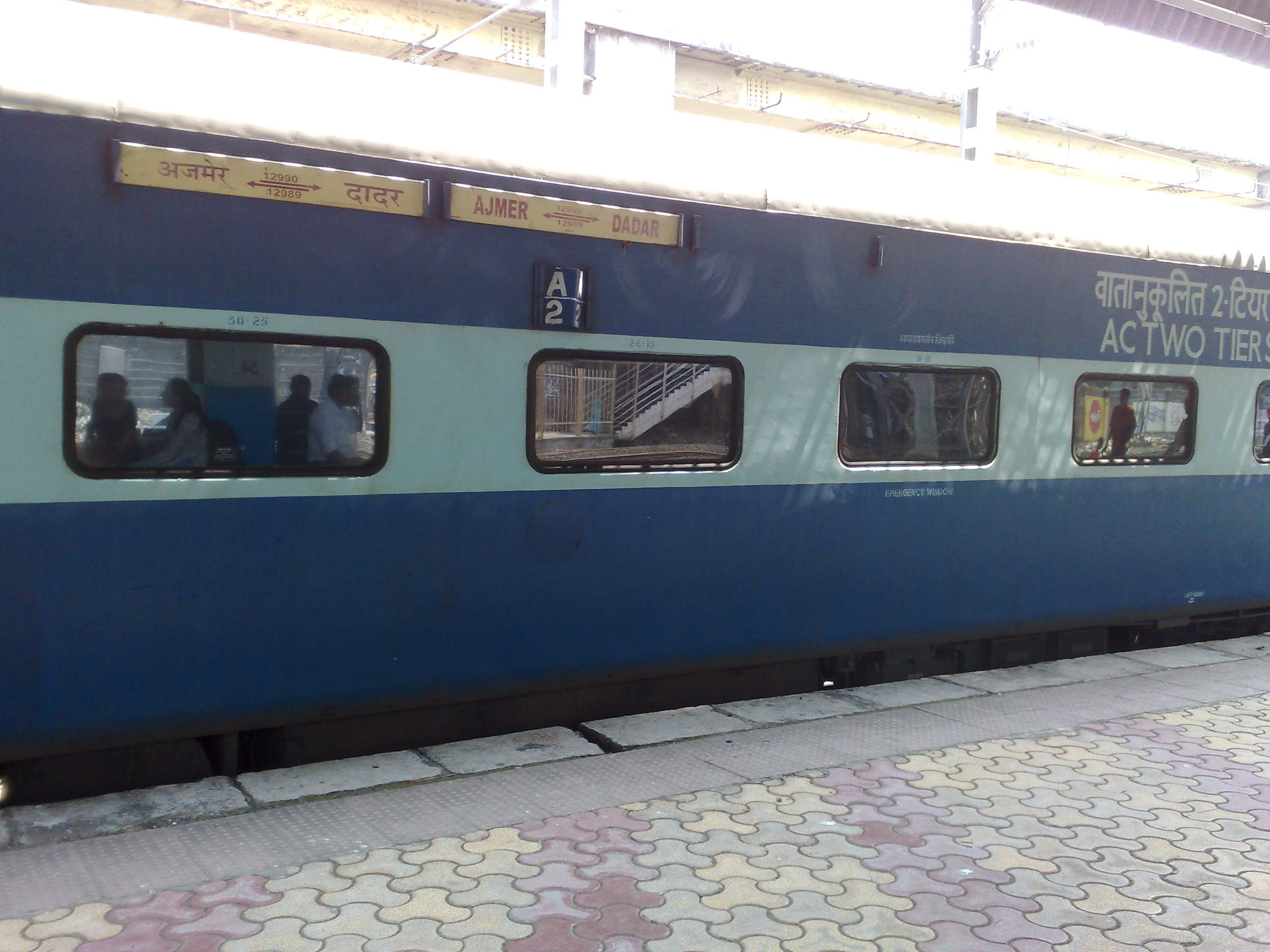
Ajmer–Dadar Express – AC 2 tier coach

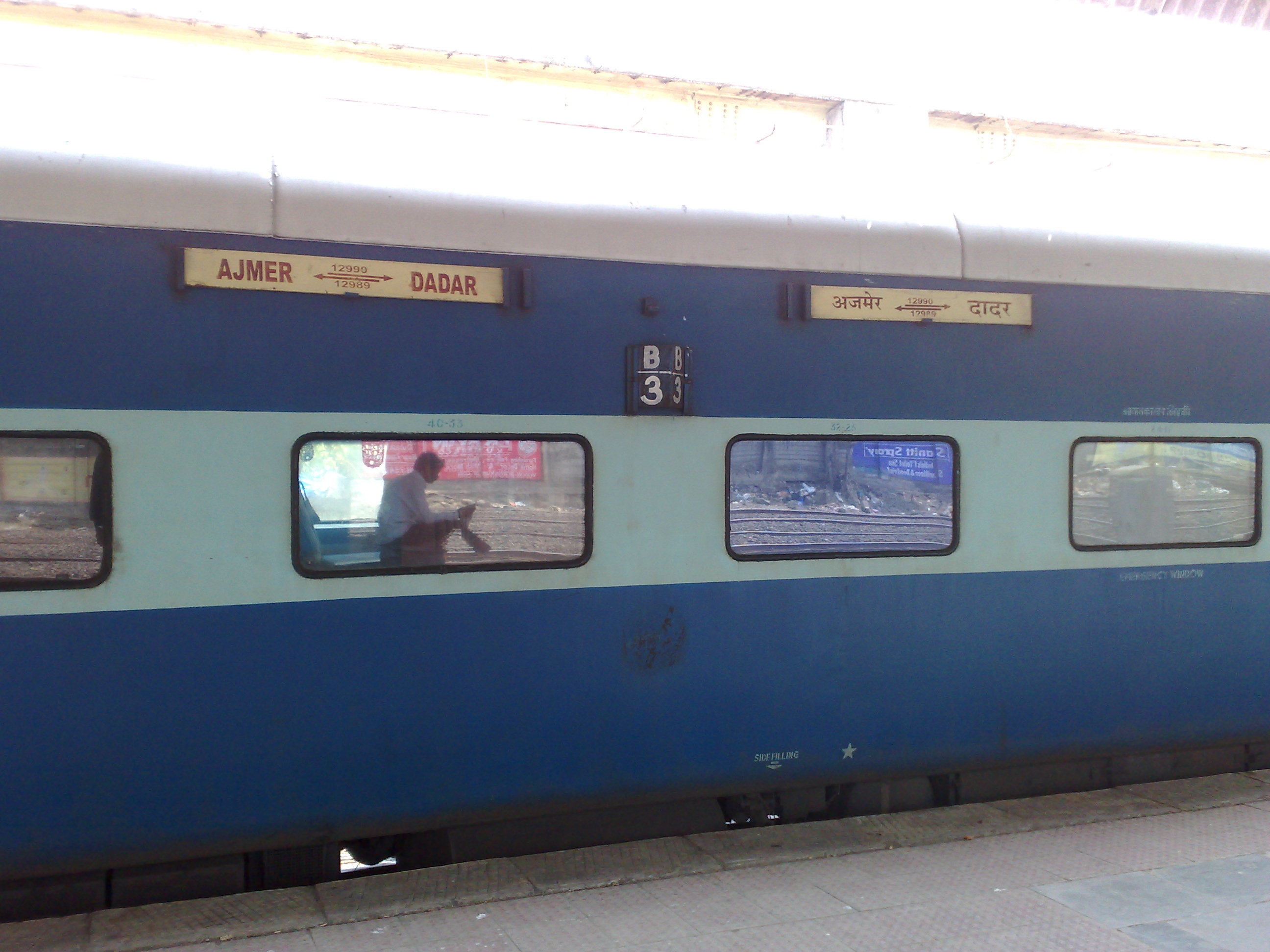
Ajmer–Dadar Express – AC 3 tier coach

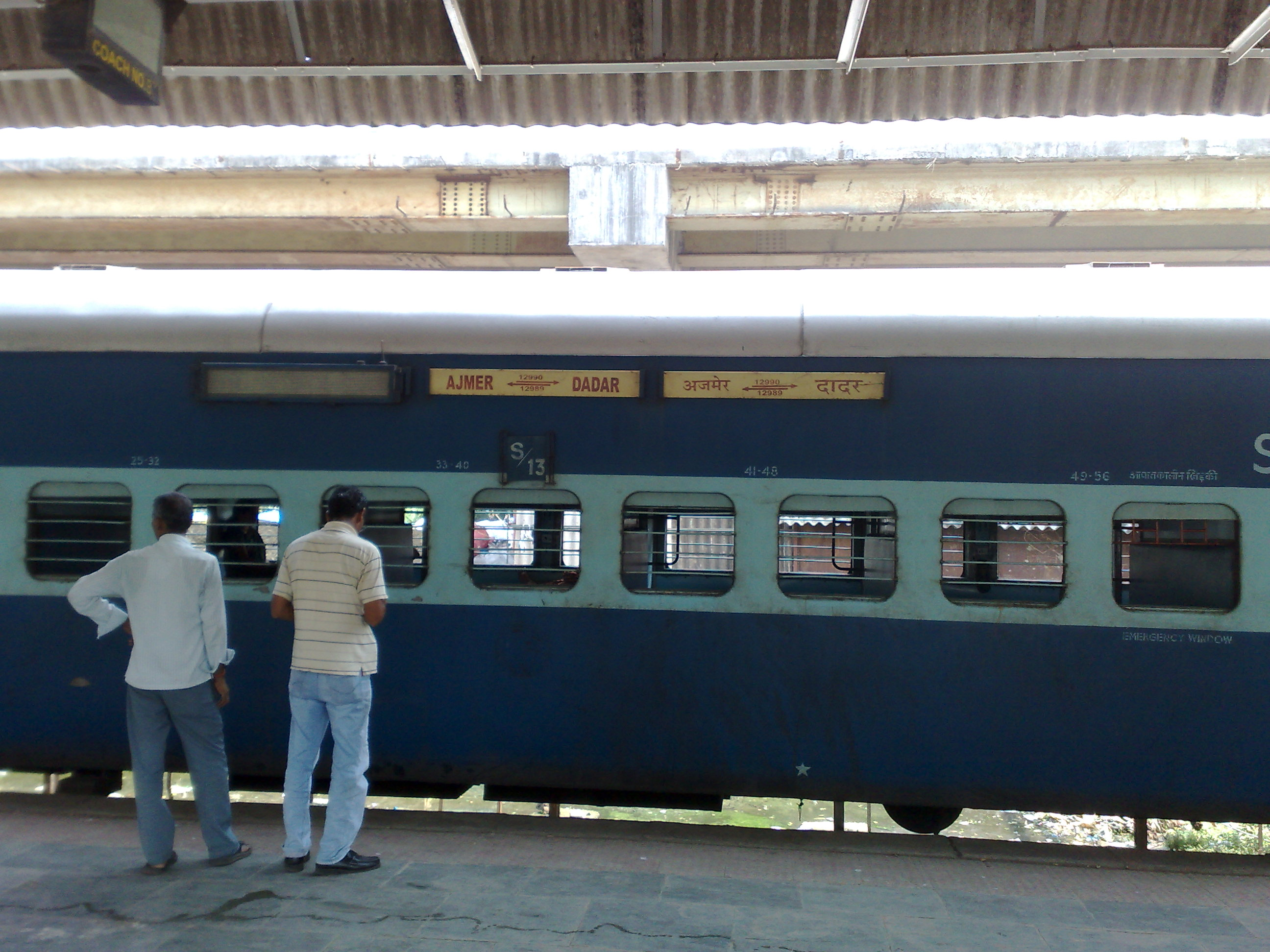
Ajmer–Dadar Express – Sleeper class coach

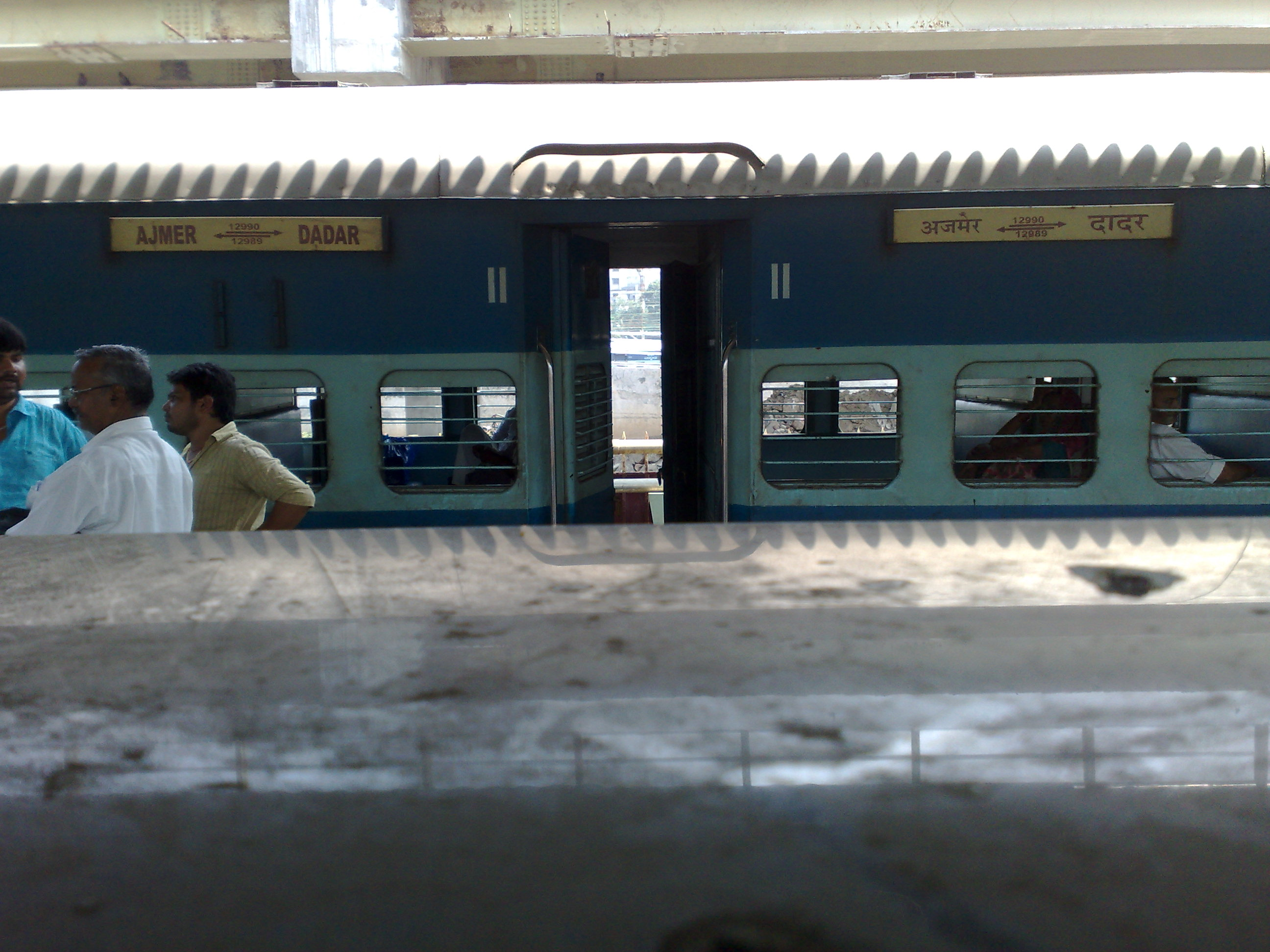
Ajmer–Dadar Express – General coach

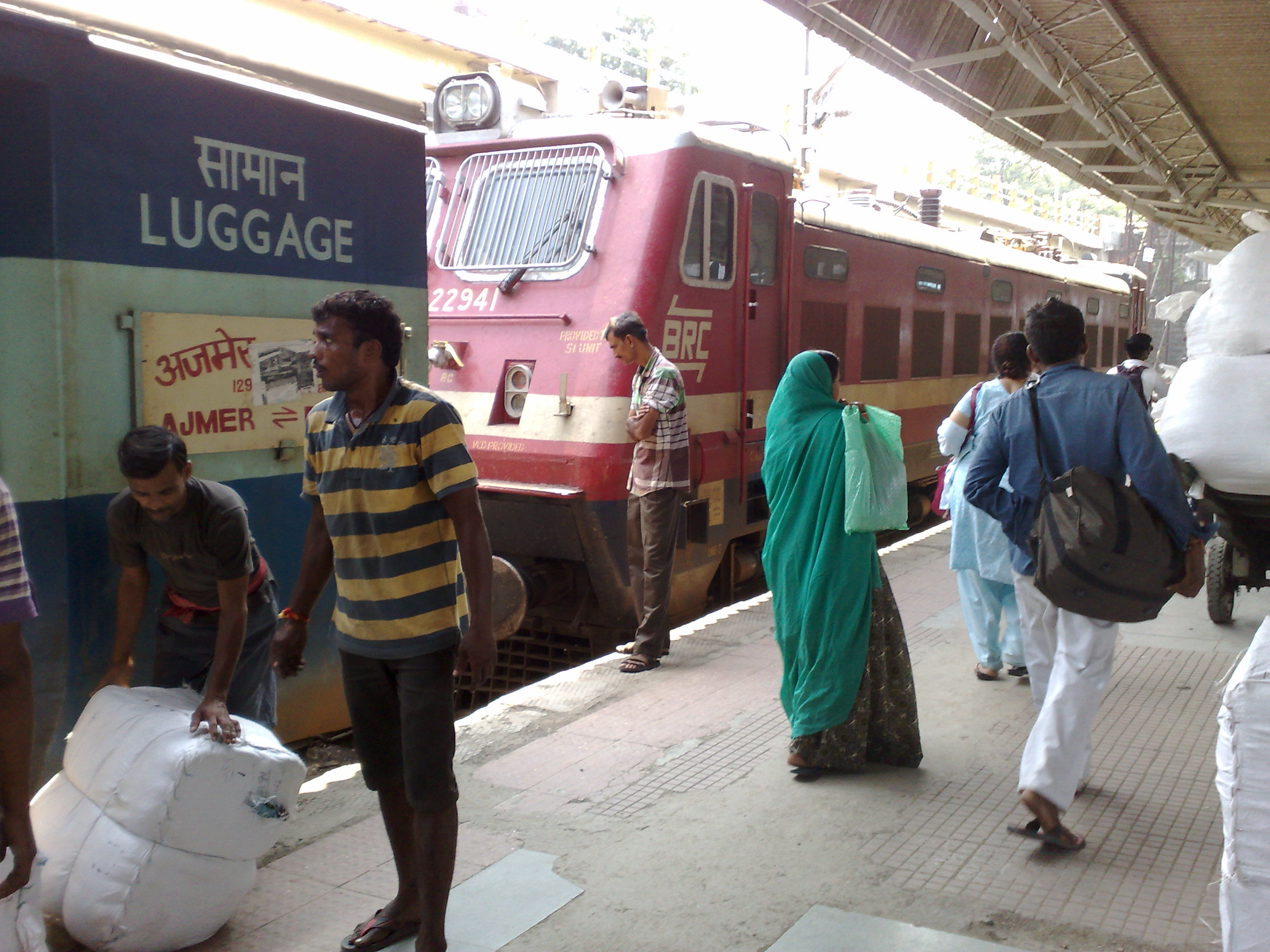
Ajmer–Dadar Express with a Vadodara WAP-4 engine

== Timings ==
12990 Ajmer–Dadar Express leaves Ajmer Junction every Wednesday, Friday & Sunday at 19:20 hrs IST and reaches Dadar at 12:40 hrs IST the next day.

12989 Dadar–Ajmer Express leaves Dadar every Monday, Thursday & Saturday at 14:35 hrs IST and reaches Ajmer Junction at 08:05 hrs IST the next day.
