= Mahesana Junction railway station =

Railway Station in Gujarat, India

Mahesana Junction Indian Railway station
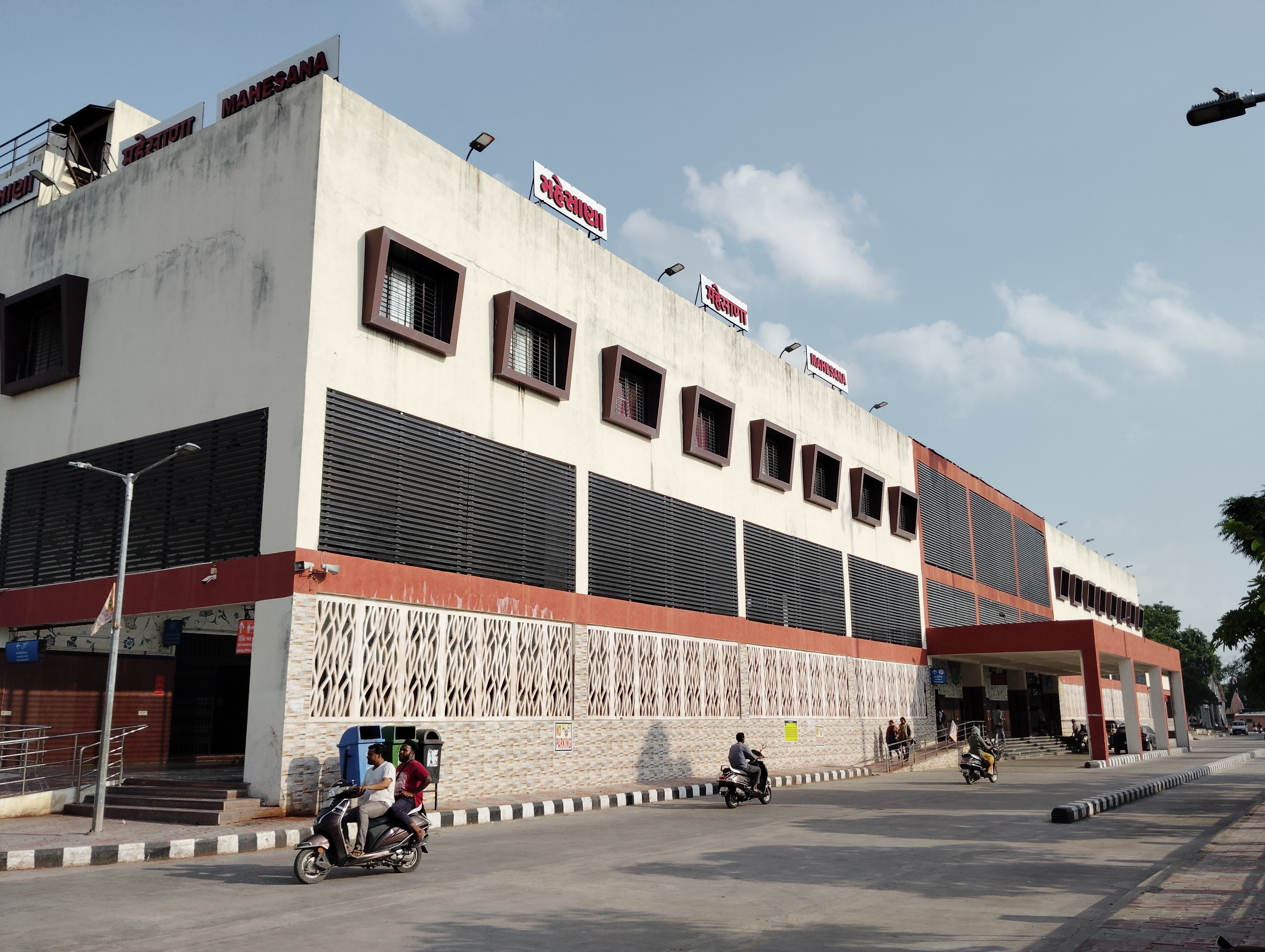
- Mehsana Junction railway station

General information
- Location: Mehsana, Mehsana District, Gujarat; India
- Coordinates: 23°36′12″N 72°23′18″E
- Elevation: 95 metres (312 ft)
- Owner: Indian Railways
- Operator: Western Railway
- Lines: Ahmedabad–Delhi main line Jaipur–Ahmedabad line Viramgam–Mahesana line Mahesana–Taranga line Mahesana–Patan line
- Platforms: 8
- Tracks: 12 (2 for freight)
- Connections: Taxi stand, Autorickshaw, Mahesana Bus Depot, City Bus,Rapido(Taxi Service)

Construction
- Structure type: Standard on ground
- Parking: Yes
- Cycle facilities: No
- Accessible: Disabled access

Other information
- Status: Active
- Station code: MSH
- Division(s): Ahmedabad

History
- Opened: 1881; 145 years ago
- Rebuilt: 2024-26
Location
- Location within India Location within Gujarat

Mahesana Junction railway station (also spelt Mehsana unofficially) is located in Mehsana, Mehsana district in the Indian state of Gujarat. It serves the city of Mehsana.

== History ==
Rajputana State Railway extended the metre-gauge Delhi–Ajmer line to Ahmedabad in 1881. In 1880, the Government of Bombay addressed His Highness’ Government of Baroda State for the construction of feeder lines in Kadi after the completion of Dabhoi Railway. In Kadi, a network of railway line was spread out.

The Government of Bombay and the government of Baroda State opened the Mehsana–Viramgam metre gauge line in 1891. Viramgam–Mahesana gauge conversion started in 1991. It was re-opened in 2005, after gauge conversion to 5 ft 6 in (1,676 mm) broad gauge.

The Mehsana–Taranga Hill metre-gauge line was opened for traffic from 1887 to 1909. The line went under gauge conversion to 5 ft 6 in (1,676 mm) broad gauge from 2016 to 2020. Mehsana–Vadnagar section was commissioned in September 2019 while Vadnagar–Varetha section was commissioned in October 2020; completing the project. Taranga Hill–Ambaji–Abu Road line is under construction.

The Mehsana–Patan metre gauge line was opened on 20 July 1891 and was extended to Wagrod and Kakoshi in 1915 and 1916 respectively. The Manund Road–Harij branch metre gauge line as well as Chanasma-Bechraji metre gauge line were opened in 1908.

The Khodiyar–Mahesana sector was converted to 5 ft 6 in (1,676 mm) broad gauge in 1995 and the Mahesana–Palanpur section was converted in 1997, which along with the conversion of the Ajmer–Palanpur section, completed the conversion of the entire Jaipur–Ahmedabad line.

== Infrastructure and facilities ==
Mahesana Junction railway station is at an elevation of 95 metres (312 ft) and is assigned the code MSH. It has 8 platforms and 3 siding tracks and total 11 tracks. It is railway junction of four lines that are Ahmedabad–Delhi line, Mahesana–Taranga Hill line, Mahesana–Patan line, Mahesana–Viramgam line.

The station has main entry gate on west and another gate on east. The old station was built in 1954 and was demolished when the new station serving the west side was opened on 26 February 2024. Total ₹26 crore (US$2.7 million) was allotted in 2024 for constructing new passenger facilities on the eastern side. The station was redeveloped under Amrit Bharat Station Scheme (ABSS) in 2025-26.

As of 2025, 38 Superfast, 23 Mail/Express, and 10 Local trains stop every day at the station while 6 trains depart from the station.

The station used by around 12,000 passengers every day.

== Gallery ==
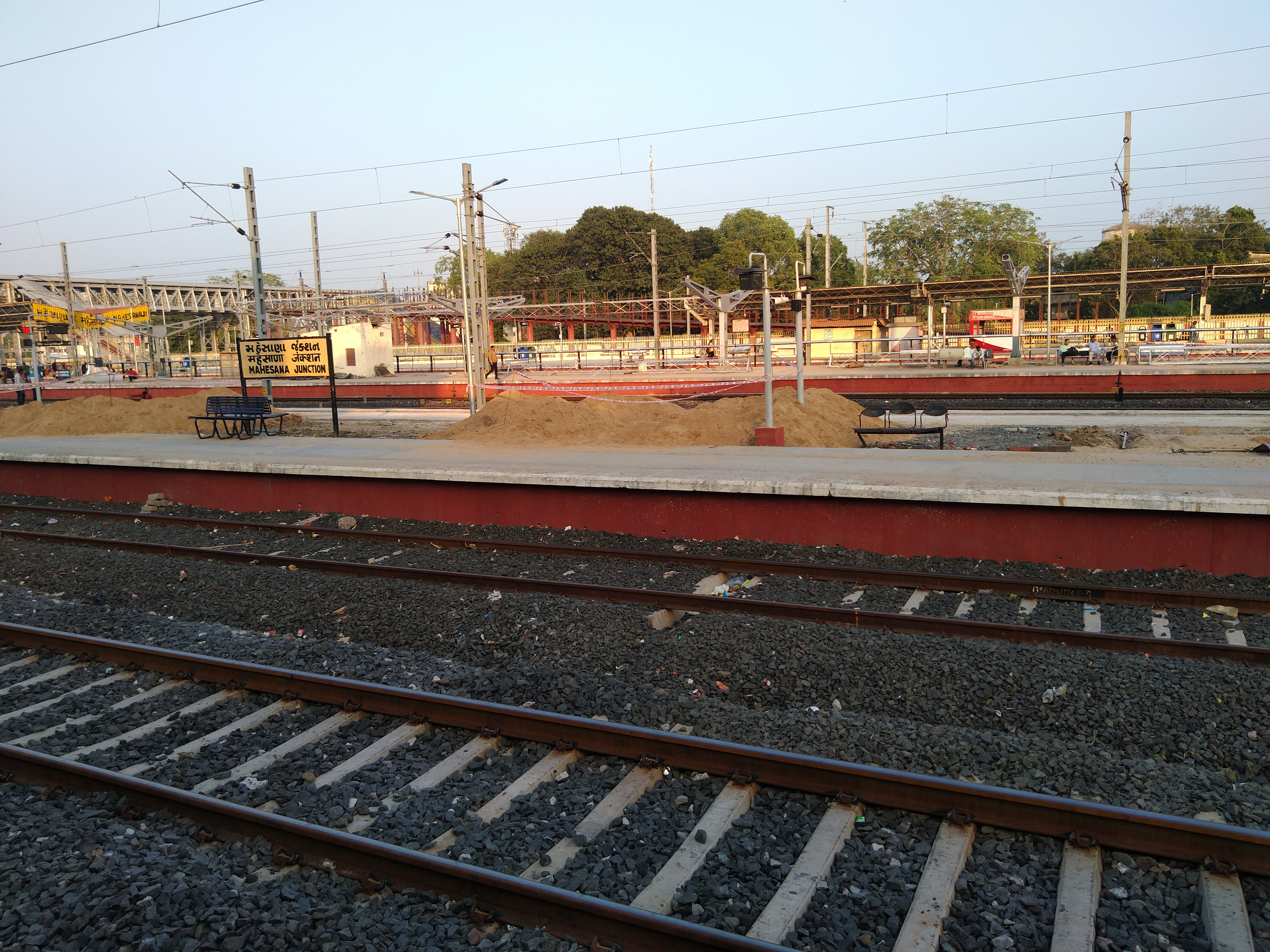
Station sign board on platform

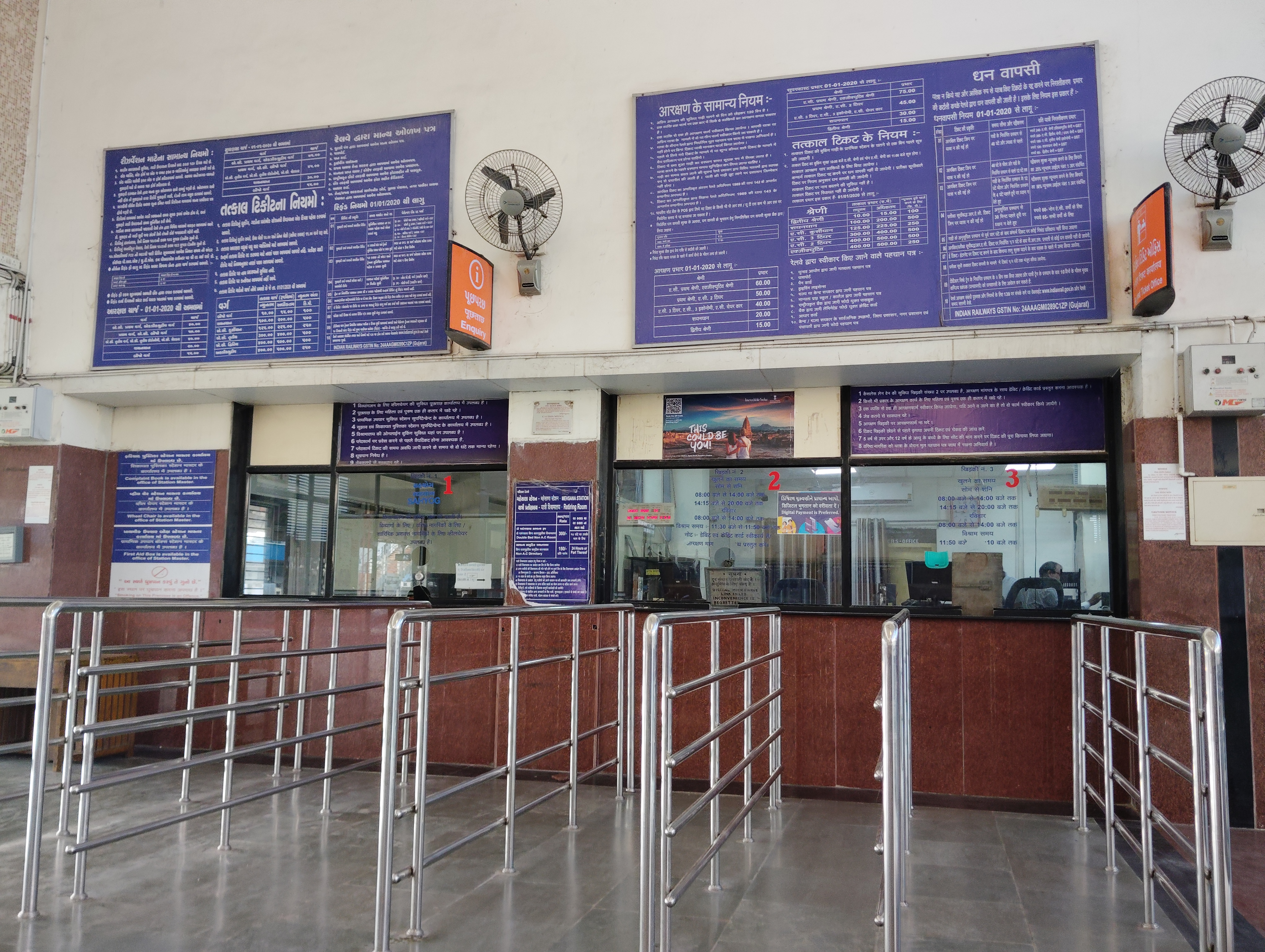
Ticket reservation and inquiry windows

Preceding station	Indian Railways	Following station
Bhandu Motidau towards ?	Western Railway zone Jaipur–Ahmedabad line	Sobhasan towards ?
Boriyavi towards ?	Western Railway zone Viramgam–Mahesana section	Terminus
Terminus	Western Railway zone Mahesana–Patan line	Panchot towards ?
Terminus	Western Railway zone Mahesana–Taranga Hill line	Visnagar towards ?
