= Ranghad (term) =

Rajput group in Haryana & Uttar Pradesh

The term "Ranghad" is commonly associated with Ranghars, or individuals of Rajput descent originating from Haryana and Uttar Pradesh. While a significant portion of individuals bearing this surname adhere to the Muslim faith, there also exists a considerable Hindu population among the Ranghad community in Haryana. Following the Partition of India in 1947, many Muslim Ranghads migrated to Pakistan, primarily settling in the provinces of Punjab and Sindh.

== Etymology of the term "Ranghad" ==
The term Ranghad finds its roots in Sanskrit, deriving from the combination of "rann" meaning "battle," and "ghada," meaning "to make." When combined, Ranghad signifies "the one who is made for battle."

Historical records reveal variations in the application of the term across different regions and contexts. According to the Rohtak Gazetteer of 1883, Ranghad was used to describe both Hindu and Muslim Rajputs in the Rohtak district. Similarly, the Hisar Gazetteer echoes this usage in Hisar. However, in Karnal, the term Ranghad referred exclusively to Muslim Rajputs. This distinction is further supported by the "Geographical, Statistical, and Historical Description of Hindostan and Adjacent Countries" (1820), which associates Ranghad solely with Muslim Rajputs.

The etymology of Ranghad as a term denoting a warrior is corroborated by various sources. "Elliot's Races of the North-Western Provinces" (1844) and H. Blochmann's translation of "Ain-e-Akbari" both attribute its origin to "rann," meaning battle. Additionally, James Tod's "Annals and Antiquities of Rajasthan" (1829) tells that Ranghad is an epithet applied to Rajputs, implying a turbulent nature stemming from strife.

Rajasthani literature further reflects the usage of Ranghad as a synonym for Rajputs, irrespective of their religious affiliation. For instance, the verses of "Rajiya Ra Doha" by Kripa Ram Ji Khidiya (1743-1833), also known as Rajiya Barhath Kriparam Khidiya, depict Ranghad as emblematic of Rajput valor.

"Jaat subhaav na jaaye, ke Ranghad bodo hai,

Hai ran maacha aaye, reeth bajaave Raajiya."

"Ran Ranghad raaji rahe, baale mocha bat

Tarwara tegaa jhade, jad maache gah ghat.

Rann rachi jad Raanghada, kampe dhara Kamath

Rath roke pahata ravi, jad maache gah ghat."

These verses, along with numerous others from Rajasthani literature, emphasize the heroic attributes associated with the term Ranghad.

Through various historical accounts and literary references, the term Ranghad emerges as a symbol of martial prowess and valor, encapsulating the spirit of Rajput heritage across different regions and epochs.

== Ranghadi language ==
The Ranghad Rajputs migrated from Haryana settled in Pakistan refer their language as ranghadi. Although the same language is known as Haryanvi in India.

According to the book "A memoir of central India" (1832), The Ranghadi Bhasha prevails as far West as the Indus, East as far as the frontier of Bundelkhand, South to the Satpoora hills, and North to Jeypoor, Joudpoor, and Jesselmeer. There is in different provinces a difference in the pronunciation, and in many of the words; but the language is the same, and is written in the same character. Many books and songs have been composed in this language. The reason is that because the Rajputs of this region often known as Rangra/Rangda.

Further he also mentioned that the word Ranghad, the Rajpoots say, is derived from Run, signifying battle, and Gurh, a fort; an epithet asserted to have been given them by one of the Kings of Delhi, expressive of their bravery.

== Conversion to Islam ==
The conversion to Islam among the Ranghad community is a subject marked by various narratives across different estates. Some accounts attribute their conversion to figures like Khawaja Moin ud Din Ajmeri, renowned for their religious teachings. However, a significant wave of conversions occurred during the reign of Firoz Shah Tughlaq, a prominent ruler of the Delhi Sultanate. Under his administration, a substantial number of Rajputs, including groups like the Qaimkhani and Khanzadas of Rajputana and Mewat, embraced Islam. This period witnessed a similar trend among the Ranghad estates, wherein many were compelled or influenced to convert to Islam.

The influence exerted by these converted Ranghads subsequently extended to other Rajput communities in Haryana, fostering a broader wave of conversions to Islam within the region.

== Ranghad resistance against British colonial rule ==
=== Pre-1857 Rebellions ===
In 1803, after the dominance of the British over Haryana, the Muslim Bhatti Rajputs of western Haryana adopted a tough stance against the British. They organized under the leadership of Zabita Khan of Sirsa and Rania, and Khan Bahadur Khan of Fatehabad. In response, the British Government launched several expeditions to subdue the rebellion. Despite numerous attacks, the British were unable to rout the Bhattis and their leaders. British established a strong garrison at Hansi fort under the command of Mirza Illahi Beg, a Mughal chieftain who was appointed as the Nazim of Hisar. However, he was killed by the Ranghads. Consequently, the British distributed the aforementioned territory among the nawabs of Jhajjar, Loharu, and Dujana. The British sent Colonel Browning in 1803, but the Bhattis again defeated the British forces. In the battle Colonel Browning was also killed.

The British postponed campaigns in the Sirsa region until 1809, during which time the Bhatti Rajputs continued their plundering in British territory. The British Resident, A. Scton, at the instance of Governor General Lord Minto, dispatched a large contingent under the command of Edward Gardiner in 1809 to establish British control over the region.

Gardiner first targeted the Rohtak territory, marching via Ballabhgarh and reaching Beri in the middle of March 1809. Here, he encountered little opposition from the rebels. Subsequently, the Zamindars of Dighal, Kahanaur, and Nigana (Ranghad villages) were brought under control.After settling the Rohtak region, Gardiner proceeded to Hisar. While en route, about 2,000 Ranghads attacked the British force on May 14, 1809, resulting in a bloody battle at Balliali, a small village near Hansi. Despite the villager's gallant efforts, they were defeated due to their small numbers and inferior arms and ammunition.

Following this, Colonel Skinner, Colonel Ball, and Colonel Adam's forces joined Gardiner's contingent. The contingent first attacked Bhiwani, and then the British troops launched an assault on the Bhatti Ranghads, but were defeated and Col. Ball was killed. In the months of June–July 1810, Colonel Skinner, with his cavalry force, launched another attack, but again was defeated. On December 3, 1810, Colonel Adam, commanding a considerably large force, attacked the rebels. The Bhattis fiercely resisted the British force at Fatehabad but were ultimately defeated. Colonel Adam then attacked Sirsa and Rania on December 19 and 21 respectively. Nawab Zabita Khan fled, while the Bhattis fought valiantly, albeit in vain.

In this region, a considerable military force was stationed at Hansi, which also served as the civil headquarters. Edward Gardiner held charge of the district for six years. Even after his submission to the British, Nawab Zabita Khan continued to encourage raids on his neighbors and disregarded his masters' authority. The British Resident repeatedly instructed the Bhatti Chief to restrain his activities but to no avail.

Finally, in 1818, a British force was dispatched against him. Despite the Bhattis utmost resistance, they were ultimately defeated. Consequently, thousands of Bhattis were killed, and Sirsa and Rania were confiscated.

Similarly, opposition arose from the Ranghads, Meos, Ahirs, and Jats of southern Haryana, including the districts of Gurgaon and Mahendergarh. These territories were either directly ruled by the Company or through native chiefs. The people fought beyond expectations, and the British forces crushed their rebellion by 1809.

=== Mutiny of 1857 ===
During the Indian Rebellion of 1857, the Ranghads openly opposed British colonial rule and fought bravely. Ranghads in the Rohtak district, who served as soldiers in a regular regiment of the East India Company, played a significant role. When these soldiers went on leave, Bahadur Shah Zafar's messenger Tafazzul Hussain, leading a small army, met with these Ranghads. The messenger convinced them to join the revolt.

Upon learning of this development, Rohtak's collector, John Adam Loach, deemed it more appropriate to flee with his officers, recognizing their inability to face the rebels. Subsequently, the rebels set fire to government offices and bungalows and released prisoners from Rohtak jail. John Adam Loch, along with the 60th regiment native infantry led by Thomas Seaton, attempted to control the rebels by camping at the District Court Rohtak with the regiment. However, the soldiers of the same regiment also turned rebellious.

Under the leadership of Rao Basharat Ali, the rebels liberated a large portion of Rohtak from British control. In response, Major General Wilson dispatched Lieutenant Hudson to Rohtak with six British officers and 361 armed soldiers to crush the rebellion. Soon, Hudson confronted the rebels under the command of Risaldar Basharat Ali Rao. Hudson described the rebels as fighting fiercely, but Risaldar Basharat Ali was martyred, and the rebels retreated.

The following morning, Ranghads under the leadership of Rao Sabar Khan attacked Hudson's force with 300 horse riders and 1000 other soldiers. Hudson was defeated and retreated to Delhi with his remaining force.

=== 1915 Singapore Mutiny ===
On 27 January 1915, the 5th Light Infantry was to be transferred to Hong Kong for garrison duties. The 5th light infantry primerly consisted of Ranghad soldiers. Under the leadership of three officers, Subedar Dunde Khan, Jemedar Chiste Khan, and Jemedar Ali Khan the regiment did a mutiny against the British army. The mutiny lasted for almost three days and they killed about 36 British soldiers. Mutiny was eventually suppressed by Allied forces after several days of intense conflict. Allied naval vessels, including French and Japanese warships, arrived to assist in quelling the rebellion. The mutineers were gradually rounded up and captured, with many of them scattering into the jungle. 64 mutineers were sentenced to transportation for life, and 73 received prison terms ranging from seven to 20 years. 47 were sentenced to execution by firing squad publicly.

== Ranghad Rajput clans ==
=== Panwar ===
The Panwars of Rohtak claim descent from two of the princes of Ujjain named Kalyan Singh and Bhawan Singh, who were married to the Tomar princesses of Delhi. These princesses were the daughters of Raja Anangpal Tomar II. Raja Anangpal, the ruler of the Tomara dynasty at that time, granted them jagirs in Rohtak and the surrounding region. Raja Kalyan Singh, first of all, established a new town named Kalanaur, derived from his own name. Later, his descendants spread throughout the Rohtak region and established many estates. The city of Rohtak is also said to be named after one of the Panwar chieftains named Rohtas Singh Panwar after he built a new fort named Rohtasgarh. The Panwars of Rohtak were formidable adversaries of the Tanwars of Hisar, and Sandhill at Mahim served as the fixed boundary between their territories.

=== Chauhan ===
The Chauhans of Haryana claim their descent from one of the Chauhan chieftains named Rana Har Rai Chauhan. According to the bard, Rana Har Rai, who had been bathing in the Ganges, returned through the sacred Kurukshetra, which was then held by Pundir Rajputs. They had four forts: Habri, Pandri, Pundrak, and Churangarh. A quarrel arose between Rana Har Rai and the Pundirs. In S. 891, he founded Jundla and fixed it as his headquarters. Rana Har Rai conquered Habri, Pundri, and then stormed Churangarh (Churani), where the Pundirs made their last stand before being driven to the east of the Yamuna, where they now reside. Rana Har Rai married two Rajput wives . The Rajputs of the Mustafabad pargana in Jagadhri are also descendants of Har Rai. The sons by Rajput women founded various villages, with Kalia settling in Karnal and Kaura in Habri. The Chauhans of Pipli, Jagadhri, and Naraingarh are also descended from Rana Har Rai.

=== Tanwar/Toor ===
The Tanwar Ranghad claim their origin from the Tomara dynasty of Delhi. Jatu, Raghu, and Satraola are three sub-clans of the Tanwars of Haryana.

Their traditional origin is somewhat as follows: On the establishment of Chauhan ascendancy in the Tomara kingdom of Delhi under the great Chauhan Bisaldeo, Some Tanwars emigrated from Delhi to Jilopattan. Dul Ram, a son or descendant of Anangpal, reigned there, and his son Jairat extended the Tanwar dominion to Bagor in Jaipur. By a Sankla Rajput woman, Jairat had a son named Jatu. Jatu subsequently emigrated to Sirsa, where he married Palat Devi, the daughter of Kauwarpal, a Siroha Rajput, the Raja of that part. Kanwarpal gave over the Hansi ilaka to his son-in-law, and the latter summoned his two brothers, Raghu and Satraola, from Jilopattan. It was divided into three tappas or populations.

Jatu had two sons, Sadh and Harpal. Sadh founded the present village of Rajli, and Harpal that of Gurana. After the fall of Prithviraj Chauhan, the Jatus extended their power over the parganas of Agroha, Hansi, Hissar, and Bhiwani. Raghu and Satraola Rajputs are traditionally the brothers of Jatu Rajputs. Therefore, these tribes do not intermarry.

=== Madhad/Mandahar ===
According to Mandahar Jaga/bards, they are descendants of Loekumar, the son of Ramchandra, who was adopted by his uncle Lachman. The descendants of Lao ruled successively in Garh Gawaler, Nikatarpuri, Ajudia, Bijapur, Kachwaglana, and Kamapahari. Raja Jana left Kamapahari and came to bathe in Kurushetra. At a tirth near Jind, his wife bore a son named Jindra. Later, in S. 801, Jindra founded Jindh. His grandson, Sadh, took Kaithal from the Chandel Rajputs in S. 1093. Sadh begot Bampra, who in turn begot three sons named Kallu, Kalu, and Mamraj. Kallu settled in Kalyat, Kalu in Rajaundh, and Mamraj in Kaithal. Kallu's son, Rana Gurkha, stormed the three forts of Asandh, Safidon, and Salwan, expelling the Barah Rajputs, and settled in Asandh in S. 1131. The Safidon branch later expelled the Chandel Rajputs from Kokand and Gharaunda. However, the Chandels again reconquered these areas.

During the reign of Firoz Shah, many Mandahar Ranas were taken to Delhi and converted to Islam.

=== Bhatti ===
The Bhatti Ranghads are descended from Achal, one of the sons of Raja Jaunra, through a later descendant, Barsi, who extended the Bhatti dominion from the south to Bhatner, which the Bhattis held until they were expelled by the Rathore Raja of Bikaner. Subsequently, the Bhattis became the dominant power in the tract corresponding to the present Sirsa tahsil and the northern part of tahsil Fatahabad.

=== RAO RAJPUT ===
Here is a family of Ranghad in Village (jaee) Meerut district UP the one and only family from Kalanaur district Haryana. Since partition Here is a small family of four brothers.

- * * Late Rao Jabir Ali * * *

1. Dr Gulam Nabi. 2. Mohd. Irfan. 3. Mohd. Nasir. 4. Rao Julfikar Ali. •Dr. Gulam Nabi.. 1. Dr Rao Tanveer Ahmed. 2. Drx. Rao Zubair Ahmed. •Mohd. Irfan. 1. Zunaid Rao. 2. Nadeem Rao. 3. Kaleem Rao. 4. Shuaib Rao. 5. Azeem Rao. •Mohd. Nasir. 1. Mohd. Mateen. 2. Mohd. Shaan. 3. Mohd. Anas. • Rao Julfikar Ali. 1. Rao Haider Ali. One and only family of ranghad rajput.

=== Other Ranghad clans ===
Joiya, Rathore, Pundir and Khokhar

== Prominent historic Ranghad Rajput figures ==
=== Mohan Singh Mandahar ===
Mohan Singh Mandahar was a chieftain of the Kaithal region, renowned for his resistance against Babur's authority during the medieval period. In a significant event, Mohan Mandahar and his forces successfully defeated a Mughal army of 3,000 horsemen commanded by Ali Quli Hamdani. However, eager to restore his prestige, Babur launched a retaliatory expedition against the Mandahars. Employing cunning tactics, they lured the Mandahars out of their village and subsequently razed it to the ground. The brutal onslaught resulted in the death of around 1,000 men, women, and children, including Mohan Singh.

=== Massa Ranghar/Massa Ranghad ===
Massa Ranghad or Musalal Khan was the Ranghad choudhary of Mandiala. In 1738, the Subahdar(Governor) of Lahore Zakariya Khan Bahadur, appointed Massa Ranghad as the Commandant of Amritsar. He used the precincts of the Golden Temple for amusement with dancing girls.

=== Najaf Kuli Khan ===
Najaf Kuli Khan was a Rathore Rajput. He served as one of the commanders of the Mughal forces and held the jagir of Rewari. He also expelled Sikh and Jat forces from the district of Tijara.

=== Muhammad Hassan Khan Bhatti ===
Muhammad Hassan Khan was a Bhatti Ranghad chieftain. After Nader Shah retreated from India in 1747 CE, Rania was taken over by Muhammad Hassan Khan. He seized control of Rania, Fatehabad, and Sirsa, engaging in an ongoing struggle with the Sikh rulers of Patiala and Jind States for control of this tract.

== Modern Ranghad personalities ==
Rao Muhammad Yousaf (Founder/President Rajput Ithad Council) RIC Group

- Rao Abdul Sattar (Pakistan's First Leader of the Upper House)
- Rao Khurshid Ali Khan
- Rao Hashim Khan
- Rana Phool Muhammad Khan
- Rafi Muhammad Chaudhry
- Rao Muhammad Afzal Khan
- Rao Abdul Rasheed (Former Punjab Police Chief)
- Rao Sikandar Iqbal (Former Defense Minister of Pakistan)
- Maj Gen (R) Rao Farman Ali
- Rana Muhammad Iqbal Khan (Former Speaker Punjab House)
- Rao Qamar Sulaiman (Former Chief of Pakistan Air Force)
- Rao Qaisar Ali Khan
- Rao Muhammad Ajmal Khan
- Rana Mahmudul Hasan
- Rao Sardar Ali Khan (Former Punjab Police Chief)
- Jahanzeb Rao
- Afzal Gohar Rao
- Rao Iftikhar Anjum

== Titles used by Ranghad Rajputs ==
- Rao
- Rai
- Rana
- Kunwar
- Thakur
- Khan
