= Bhattiana =

Coordinates: 29.537°N 75.035°E

- Cultural region
- Map
- Country: India
- State: Haryana and Punjab

Bhattiana, also spelt Bhatiyana, is a tract of land lying in the Indian states of Haryana and Punjab between Hisar and the Garra. It was named Bhattiana because of being ruled by the Bhatti. The regions fell under the control of the different rulers, including the Mughals, and with the weakening of the Mughals, became a part of the British Raj from the early-to-mid-19th century.

== Etymology ==
The term Bhattiana means "region of the Bhattis" and the geographical area derives its name from the Bhatti clan. The Bhattiana territories, traditionally controlled by the Bhattis, covered part of modern Haryana and Punjab, and extended up to Bikaner, Rajasthan.

== History ==
There are mounds scattered around the region which contain pot-sherds. These excavations have also uncovered well-burnt bricks and the remains of kilns. These findings were found along the bank of the Ghaggar, its tributary, and also at Bhatner, Bhadrakali, Fatehgarh, Kalibangan, Rangmahal, Karnisar, and Bhawar, with the mounds ranging from 12 to 50 feet in-height. The found pot-sherds are generally classified as to belonging to three periods: 1. Indus Valley Civilization, 2. Painted Grey Ware, and 3. Black and red ware.

According to the Imperial Gazetteer of India, the whole area from the Hissar district of Haryana to Bhatner of Bikaner State, enclosing the entire tract of the Ghaggar river and ancient flow of the Sutlej river on its northwest, was known by the name Bhatiyana, and were ruled by Bhati polities. To the northeast of Bhatner Fort was a tract of jungle known as the Lakhi Jangal, which also contained the settlement of Bathinda. Some portions of this vast jungle were cut-down to construct the Bhatner Fort on a mound located at the eastern bank of the Ghaggar. The fort was positioned in a certain manner within a doab consisting of three river valleys, the Ghaggar, Drishdwati, and Sutlej, for defensive purposes. Because of the positioning of the region, it was a prime route for invading armies headed from Lahore to Delhi via Bathinda and Sirsa, thus the construction of fortresses to repel invaders from the west. The region also lies in the route from Multan and Uchh to Delhi via Pak Pattan, Dipalpur, Bhatner, and Sirsa. Thus, the region can be viewed as a gateway to Delhi by invading armies. These fortress were constructed strategically in a quadrilateral formation relatively equally distanced from one another in the settlements of Sirsa, Bhatner (present-day Hanumangarh), Bathinda, and Abohar. The Mongols invaded the subcontinent via Sirsa. The Chauhans fortified the settlement of Sirsa in-particular, and used Hansi, Samana, and other localities to help with the defence against invading Muslim armies from the west. In 1398, Timur's army passed through Multan, Abohar, Bhatner, Sirsa on his journey to conquer Delhi.

The region was devastated during the late 14th-century invasion of the north-western parts of the Indian subcontinent by Timur. The Mughals later controlled the region but their hold gradually weakened after centuries of control. Muhammad Hassan Khan was a Bhatti Ranghad chieftain. After Nader Shah retreated from India in 1747 CE, Rania was taken over by Muhammad Hassan Khan. He seized control of Rania, Fatehabad, and Sirsa, engaging in an ongoing struggle with the Sikh rulers of Patiala and Jind States for control of this tract.

The British defeated the Marathas and annexed Delhi and much of present-day Haryana .

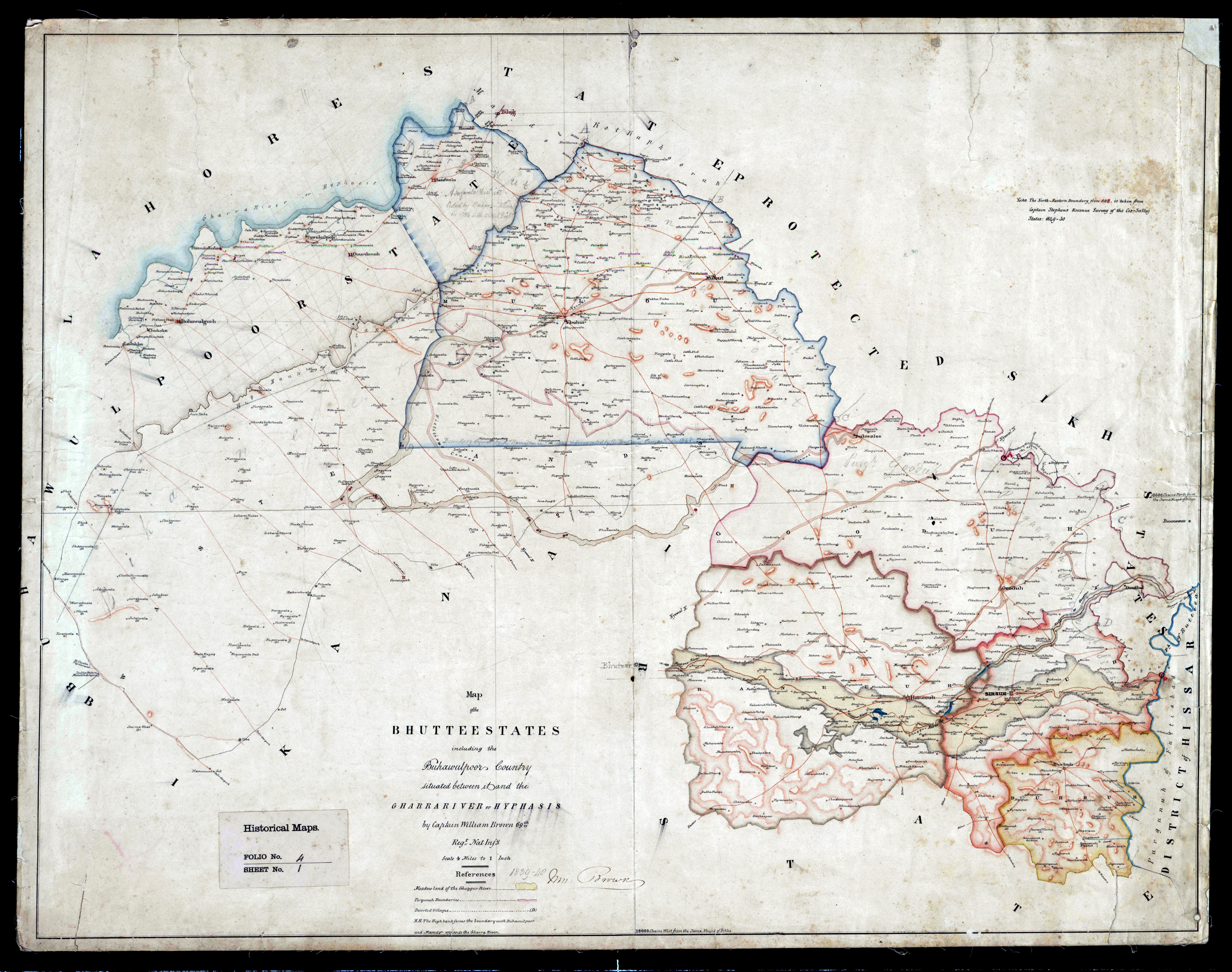
Map of the Bhatti states, including Bahawalpur State, surveyed by William Brown, 1839–40

In 1803, after the dominance of the British over Haryana, the Muslim Bhatti Rajputs of western Haryana adopted a tough stance against the British. They organized under the leadership of Zabita Khan of Sirsa and Rania, and Khan Bahadur Khan of Fatehabad. In response, the British Government launched several expeditions to subdue the rebellion. Despite numerous attacks, the British were unable to rout the Bhattis and their leaders. British established a strong garrison at Hansi fort under the command of Mirza Illahi Beg, a Mughal chieftain who was appointed as the Nazim of Hisar. However, he was killed by the Ranghads. Consequently, the British distributed the aforementioned territory among the nawabs of Jhajjar, Loharu, and Dujana. The British sent Colonel Browning in 1803, but the Bhattis again defeated the British forces. In the battle Colonel Browning was also killed.

The British postponed campaigns in the Sirsa region until 1809, during which time the Bhatti Rajputs continued their plundering in British territory. The British Resident, A. Scton, at the instance of Governor General Lord Minto, dispatched a large contingent under the command of Edward Gardiner in 1809 to establish British control over the region.

Gardiner first targeted the Rohtak territory, marching via Ballabhgarh and reaching Beri in the middle of March 1809. Here, he encountered little opposition from the rebels. Subsequently, the Zamindars of Dighal, Kahanaur, and Nigana (Ranghad villages) were brought under control.After settling the Rohtak region, Gardiner proceeded to Hisar. While en route, about 2,000 Ranghads attacked the British force on 14 May 1809, resulting in a bloody battle at Balliali, a small village near Hansi. Despite the villager's gallant efforts, they were defeated due to their small numbers and inferior arms and ammunition.

Following this, Colonel Skinner, Colonel Ball, and Colonel Adam's forces joined Gardiner's contingent. The contingent first attacked Bhiwani, and then the British troops launched an assault on the Bhatti Ranghads, but were defeated and Col. Ball was killed. In the months of June–July 1810, Colonel Skinner, with his cavalry force, launched another attack, but again was defeated. On 3 December 1810, Colonel Adam, commanding a considerably large force, attacked the rebels. The Bhattis fiercely resisted the British force at Fatehabad but were ultimately defeated. Colonel Adam then attacked Sirsa and Rania on 19 and 21 December respectively. Nawab Zabita Khan fled, while the Bhattis fought valiantly, albeit in vain.

In this region, a considerable military force was stationed at Hansi, which also served as the civil headquarters. Edward Gardiner held charge of the district for six years. Even after his submission to the British, Nawab Zabita Khan continued to encourage raids on his neighbors and disregarded his masters' authority. The British Resident repeatedly instructed the Bhatti Chief to restrain his activities but to no avail. Similarly, opposition arose from the Ranghads, Meos, Ahirs, and Jats of southern Haryana, including the districts of Gurgaon and Mahendergarh. These territories were either directly ruled by the Company or through native chiefs. The people fought beyond expectations, and the British forces crushed their rebellion by 1809.

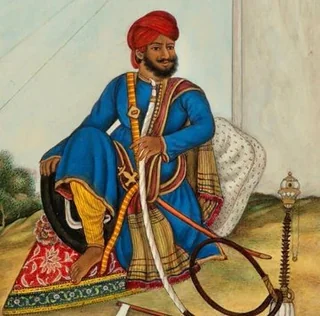
Detail of a painting of Nawab Zabita Khan Bhatti, from the Tazkirat Al-Umara of James Skinner, ca.1836

Finally, in 1818, a British force was dispatched against Zabita Khan Bhatti. Despite the Bhattis utmost resistance, they were ultimately defeated. Consequently, thousands of Bhattis were killed, and Sirsa and Rania were confiscated.

A district of Bhattiana was formed in 1837, but in 1858 it was transferred to the Punjab and absorbed into the Sirsa district, itself later divided up.

== Current status ==
Bhattiana no longer exists as an administrative unit and these regions are the parts of the Republic of India. Present-day Sirsa district was essentially Bhattiana but also included parts of current day Fatehabad district, such as Ratia and Rania.

== Language ==
A language called Bhatiani was spoken in the region. Greirson considered it to be close to the Malwai dialect of Punjabi. Mangat Bhardwaj placed it as an Eastern Punjabi lect on the periphery of the Punjabic zone.

== See also ==
- Bhattu Kalan
- Ranghad (term)
- Jangladesh
