= Rankhandi =

Rankhandi Rankhandi
- village
- Location in Uttar Pradesh, India Rankhandi (India)
- Coordinates: 29°37′N 77°39′E
- Country: India
- State: Uttar Pradesh
- District: Saharanpur
- Elevation: 1,000 m (3,300 ft)

Population
  - Total: 20,000

Languages
  - Official: Hindi
- Time zone: UTC+5:30 (IST)
- PIN: 247554
- Nearest city: Deoband
- Literacy: 90%
- Vidhan Sabha constituency: Deoband

Rankhandi is a village in Saharanpur district of Uttar Pradesh, located seven kilometers from Deoband. It served as a research site for the Cornell University researchers in Anthropology / Sociology. Cornell maintains research documents on the Rankhandi project in its archives.

The village is largely inhabited by the Pundir Rajputs and has been a major centre of education in the area for many years. Its intermediate level school is the Thakur Phool Singh Memorial Intercollege (formerly Kissan Vidyalya). Other castes in the village include the Pal, Kori, Gosain, Barhai and Ranghar, Pandit.

Cornell also helped establish a hostel, called the Cornell Hostel, for the Thakur Phool Singh School. Now there is also a degree college called Kripal Singh memorial providing graduation and master's degree in various courses. In village there are many popular old temples. There is an interesting fact about the village that village Rankhandi was chosen to fight the battle of Mahabharata but later changed. There used to be battles at this place and so the name derived form it Ran means battle khandi means place that stands for place of battles .

Maharana Pratap - The idol of Maharana pratap installed in Rankhandi in 2020.
