= Balbir Singh (Haryana politician) =

Indian politician

Member of the Haryana Legislative Assembly
- In office 25 October 2019 – 8 October 2024
- Preceded by: Krishan Lal Panwar
- Succeeded by: Krishan Lal Panwar
- Constituency: Israna

Personal details
- Born: 5 March 1974 (age 51) New Delhi, India
- Party: Indian National Congress
- Spouse: Geetha Rani
- Children: 1 Son, 4 Daughters
- Parent: Chandgi Ram
- Education: Matriculation

Balbir Balmiki Singh (born 5 March 1974) is an Indian politician from Haryana State. He was an MLA from Israna Assembly constituency which is reserved for Scheduled Caste community. Representing Indian National Congress he won the 2019 Haryana Legislative Assembly election. He was nominated again to contest from this seat in the 2024 Haryana election but lost this time.

== Early life and education ==
Singh is from Israna, Panipat district, Haryana. His father Chandi Ram is a farm labourer. He completed Class 12 and later discontinued his studies.

== Career ==
Singh won from Israna Assembly constituency representing Indian National Congress in the 2019 Haryana Legislative Assembly election. He polled 61,376 votes and defeated his nearest rival and former minister, Krishan Lal Panwar of Bharatiya Janata Party, by a margin of 20,015 votes. He was defeated by Panwar in 2024 by 13,895 votes.
