= Assandh =

Town in Haryana, India

Assandh Āsandīvat
- Town
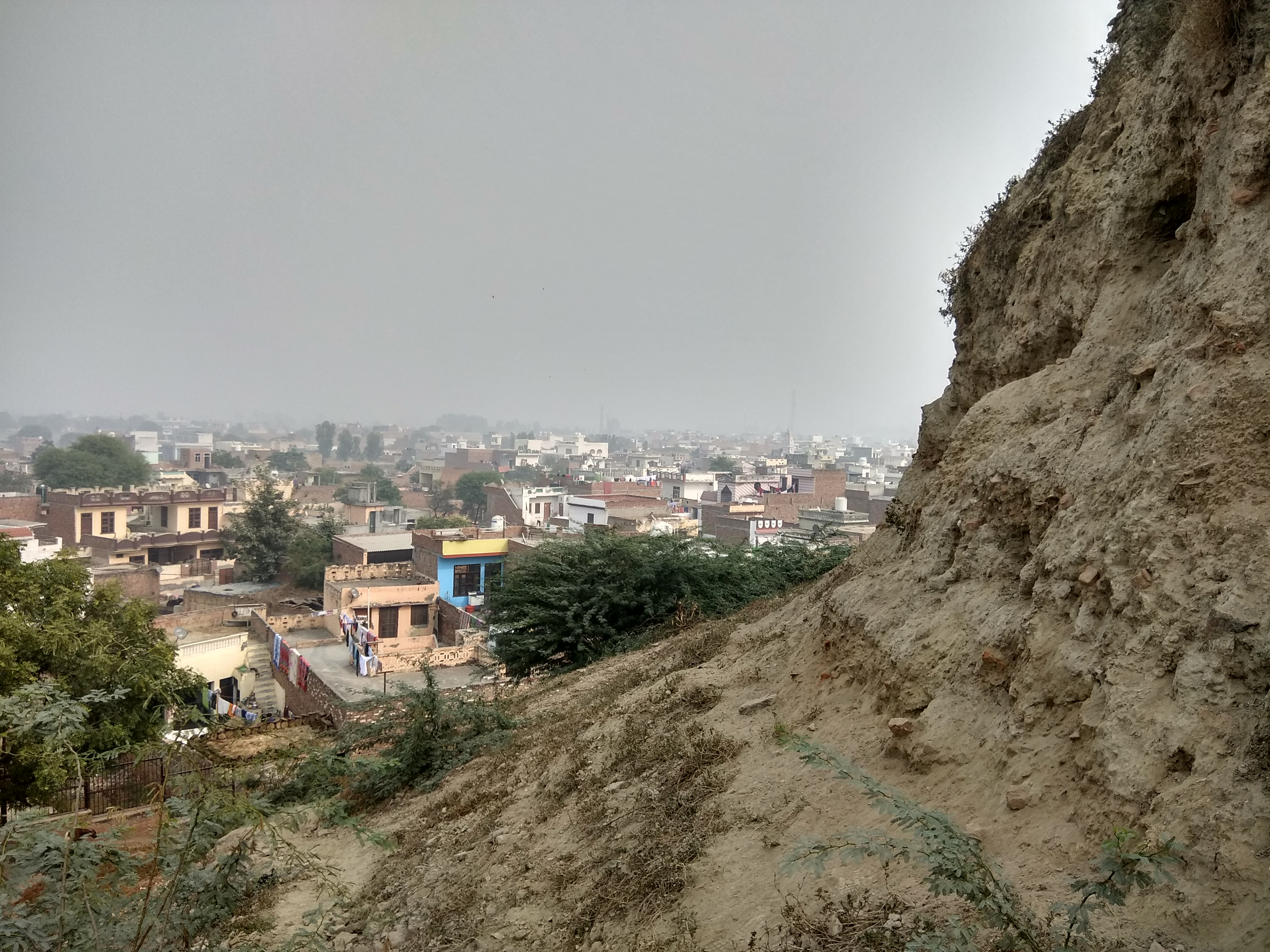
- View of Assandh town from the Stupa

- Location in Haryana, India Assandh (India)
- Coordinates: 29.51°N 76.72°E
- Country: India
- State: Haryana
- District: Karnal

Population (2011)
  - Total: 27,125

Languages
  - Official: Hindi
  - Additional official: English, Punjabi
- Time zone: UTC+5:30 (IST)
- PIN: 132039
- ISO 3166 code: IN-HR
- Vehicle registration: HR
- Website: haryana.gov.in
- STD Code 01749, DL Code HR-40

Assandh, historically known as Āsandīvat, is a town and municipal committee in the Karnal district of the Indian state of Haryana. Assandh is located in 45 km south-west of Karnal. The town is surrounded by four districts - Karnal, Kaithal, Jind and Panipat.

== History ==
=== Early history ===
Archaeological excavations have revealed Painted Grey Ware, associated with the Vedic people of Iron Age India. Assandh is identified with ancient Āsandīvat, a capital of the Kuru kingdom, which was the first recorded state in Ancient India, c. 1200 BCE. Historian Charles Allen has related this town and the Stupa to the Asandhiwat Kingdom from which hailed Asandhimitra, the Chief Empress (Agramahisi) of the Maurya Emperor Ashoka.

=== Assandh Stupa ===
The ruins of more-than-2000-year-old Buddhist stupa is situated at Assandh. The stupa is 25-metre high and at least 75 metres in diameter raised on an earthen platform. It is built with the help of bricks. This stupa is bigger than the much-famous stupa at Sanchi. According to historians, bricks used to construct this stupa, having a width of more than two-feet, indicate that the history of this monument dates back to more than 2000 years.

The ruins of this structure is also known as Jarasandh ka Qila/Teela or Jarasandh ka Teela (Fort/Mound of Jarasandh) named after a character of epic Mahabharat, and forms part of the 48 kos parikrama of Kurukshetra.

According to Archaeological Survey of India, this is a Kushan stupa (belongs to Kushan period).

=== Colonial era ===
Assandh had a large Muslim population before 1947. After the 1947, Muslims were replaced with the Sikhs and Punjabi Khatri refugee migrants from Pakistani Punjab.

=== Modern history ===
Panipat, which was the part of Karnal earlier, was carved out as a separate district on 1 November 1989, including the "Assandh Tehsil" area. To add the "Assandh Tehsil" area back to Karnal, Panipat was merged with Karnal again on 24 July 1991. Afterwards, Panipat was again carved out of Karnal on 1 January 1992, excluding Assandh Tehsil.

There is a gurdwara, many Hindu temples, a Sanatan Dharm Mandir, and a mosque.

== Demographics ==
As of 2011 Indian Census, Assandh had a total population of 27,125, of which 14,385 were males and 12,740 were females. Population within the age group of 0 to 6 years was 3,404. The total number of literates in Assandh was 18,192, which constituted 67.1% of the population with male literacy of 70.9% and female literacy of 62.7%. The effective literacy rate of 7+ population of Assandh was 76.7%, of which male literacy rate was 81.9% and female literacy rate was 70.9%. The Scheduled Castes population was 6,183. Assandh had 5081 households in 2011.

As of 2001 India census, Assandh had a population of 22,707. Males constitute 53% of the population and females 47%. Assandh has an average literacy rate of 62%, higher than the national average of 59.5%; with 58% of the males and 42% of females literate. 15% of the population was in the 0 to 6 years age group.

== Politics ==
Assandh is part of Assandh constituency of the Haryana Vidhan Sabha. The following is the list of MLAs have been elected from this constituency:

- 1952 – Kasturi Lal – INC
- 1977 – Jogi Ram – JNP
- 1982 – Manphool Singh – LKD
- 1987 – Manphool Singh – LKD
- 1991 – Krishan Lal Panwar – JP
- 1996 – Krishan Lal Panwar – SAP
- 2000 – Krishan Lal Panwar – INLD
- 2005 – Raj Rani Poonam – INC
- 2009 – Zile Ram Chochra – INC
- 2014 – Bakhshish Singh Virk – BJP
- 2019 – Shamsher Singh Gogi – INC
- 2024 - Yoginder Singh Rana - BJP

== Notable villages in Assandh Tehsil ==
- Gangatheri
- Jabhala
- Kheri Naru
- Rahara
- Rangrutti Khera
- Salwan
