= Kheri Naru =

Kheri Naru Naru Kheri
- Village
- Location in Haryana, India Kheri Naru (India)
- Coordinates: 29.647885°N 76.911018°E
- Country: India
- State: Haryana
- District: Karnal

Government
  - Body: Gram panchayat
- Elevation: 250 m (820 ft)

Population (2021)
  - Total: 13,537

Languages
  - Official: Hindi
  - unofficial: Haryanvi
- Time zone: UTC+5:30 (IST)
- PIN: 132036
- Vehicle registration: HR
- Nearest city: Karnal
- Lok Sabha constituency: Karnal
- Vidhan Sabha constituency: Assandh
- Website: haryana.gov.in

Kheri Naru, also known as Naru Ki Kheri, derived its name from the name of famous saint Naru Baba who lived there, is a village located in Karnal Tehsil of Karnal district, Haryana, India. Kheri Naru village is located in the UTC+5.30 time zone and it follows Indian standard time (IST). Kheri Naru sun rise time varies 22 minutes from IST.

== Transportation ==
=== Bus service ===
A regular government bus service is available from Karnal to Kheri Naru at a regular interval of 1 hour and a regular bus come from Panipat.

=== Rail transportation ===
The nearest railway station to Kheri Naru is Karnal railway station which is located in and around 7.0 km. The following table shows other railway stations and distance from KHERI NARU village:

- Karnal railway station (7.0 km)
- Bhaini Khurd railway station (7.0 km)
- Khiria Khurd railway station (7.0 km)
- Bazida Jatan railway station (5.0 km)

=== Air transportation ===
Kheri Naru's nearest airport is Karnal Airport situated at 15.8 km. Few more airports around Kheri Naru are as follows:

- Karnal Airport (15.8 km)
- Sarsawa Air Base (88 km)
- Patiala Airport (107 km)
- Indira Gandhi International Airport (150 km)

== Surrounding areas ==
Kheri Naru is located around 7 km away from its district headquarter Karnal. The other nearest district headquarters is Kaithal situated at 60 km distance from Kheri Naru. Surrounding districts from Kheri Naru are as follows:

- Saharanpur (U.P) district (90.0 km)
- Panipat district (33.8 km)
- Kaithal district (65.5 km)
- Kurukshetra district (40 km)
- Yamuna Nagar district (68.7 km)

Nearby villages include Hemda, which is situated about 4 km to the North of Kheri Naru, and Jundla, which is located about 3.3 km to the West.

== Schools ==
Kheri Naru nearest schools has been listed as follows:

- Government Higher Secondary School (0.2 km)
- Government Girls Primary School Haryana (0.2 km)
- Pratap Public School, Jundla (6 km)
- MNM Public School (7.5 km)
- Dyal Singh Public School, Karnal (10 km)
- Pratap Public School, Karnal (10 km)
- DPS, Karnal (17 km)
