= Khai Shergarh =

Khai Shergarh is a mid sized village located in the district of Sirsa in the state of Haryana in India. It is situated in the western part of district, around 8 km away from National Highway 09 and 28 km from district headquarter Sirsa. The location of Khai Shergarh is 29.678313°N 74.252679°E. Khai Shergarh has an average elevation of 186 metres. As per the report of census 2011 Khai Shergarh has a total population of 2734 including 1422 male and 1312 female residents. Sex Ratio of the village is 923 which is higher than the state average. Child Sex Ratio 905 (below 6 Years) is also higher than the state average. Literacy Ratio is 61.88 which is lower in comparison to the state average. The economy of the village is based on agriculture. Approximately 80% population of the village depends on agriculture and associated activities. The climate of the village is semi-arid. The majority of the people are Jats, although scheduled and backward castes also constitute a considerable portion of village population. Dhaka is powerful jaat community and other, Ghotia, Dhetarwal,Karwa,Bana,Jakhar, Jakhar,Godara, Kashnia are the Jat clans. The temple of The Lord Siva, Krishna and Bala Ji is the centre of attraction for people which is situated in the northern side of the village. Two government schools and one private school fulfil the responsibility of imparting quality education to students in the village. The village is well connected by roads to the nearby villages and cities. Daily bus service is available for Sirsa, Rania, Haryana Rania, Kalanwali and other neighbour villages. Nearest railway stations are Baraguda, Kalanwali, Sirsa and Mandi Dabwali.Rahul Godara serving as current sarpanch
