= Panipat Taraf Makhdum Zadgan =

Maratha town is a census town in Panipat district in the Indian state of Haryana.

== Demographics ==
As of 2001 India census, Panipat had a population of ------- . Males constitute 55% of the population and females 45%. Panipat has an average literacy rate of 51%, lower than the national average of 59.5%: male literacy is 60%, and female literacy is 40%. In Panipat, 18% of the population is under 6 years of age. It is a significant exporter of cotton fabrics and curtains.
