= Panipat Taraf Rajputan =

- Census town
- Location in Haryana, India Panipat Taraf Rajputan (India)
- Coordinates: 29.36594°N 76.95347°E
- Country: India
- State: Haryana
- District: Panipat

Population (2001)
  - Total: 18,806

Languages
  - Official: Hindi
- Time zone: UTC+5:30 (IST)
- ISO 3166 code: IN-HR
- Vehicle registration: HR
- Website: haryana.gov.in

Panipat Taraf Rajputan is a census town in Panipat district in the Indian state of Haryana.

== Demographics ==
As of 2001 India census, Panipat Taraf Rajputan had a population of 18,806. Males constitute 58% of the population and females 42%. Panipat Taraf Rajputan has an average literacy rate of 48%, lower than the national average of 59.5%: male literacy is 58%, and female literacy is 35%. In Panipat Taraf Rajputan, 18% of the population is under 6 years of age.
