= Bhodwal Majri =

Bhodwal Majri-भोड़वाल माजरी
- Village
- Location in Haryana, India Bhodwal Majri-भोड़वाल माजरी (India)
- Coordinates: 29°11′45″N 77°0′49″E
- Country: India
- State: Haryana
- District: Panipat
- Tehsil: Samalkha

Population
  - Total: 2,300

Languages
  - Official: Hindi
- Time zone: UTC+5:30 (IST)
- PIN: 132102
- Telephone code: 0180
- Vehicle registration: HR
- Website: haryana.gov.in

Bhodwal Majri is a village in Panipat district of Haryana, India. It is situated between the Grand Trunk Road and the Ambala-Delhi main railway line, near the town of Samalkha.

== Nirankari adopted village ==
In accordance with the vision of Satguru Baba Hardev Singh Ji Maharaj Ji Village Bhodwal Majri (Samalkha Dist) was adopted on 23 February 2017.

== Education ==
Schools

- GHSS Bhodwal Majri
- GPS Bhodwal Majri
- Geeta Sr. Sec. School

Colleges near Bhodwal Majri

- Panipat Institute of Engineering & Technology (PIET)

== Religious sites in the village ==
- Shiv Mandir
- Baba Kali Singh
- Mata Mandir
- Hanumaan Ji Mandir
- Pathri Wali Mata
- Baba Kali Singh
- Baba Bhuri Singh
- Goga Medhi Mandir

== Rail ==
Bhodwal Majri village has a railway station named Bhodwal Majri whose station code is BDMJ.

== Gallery ==
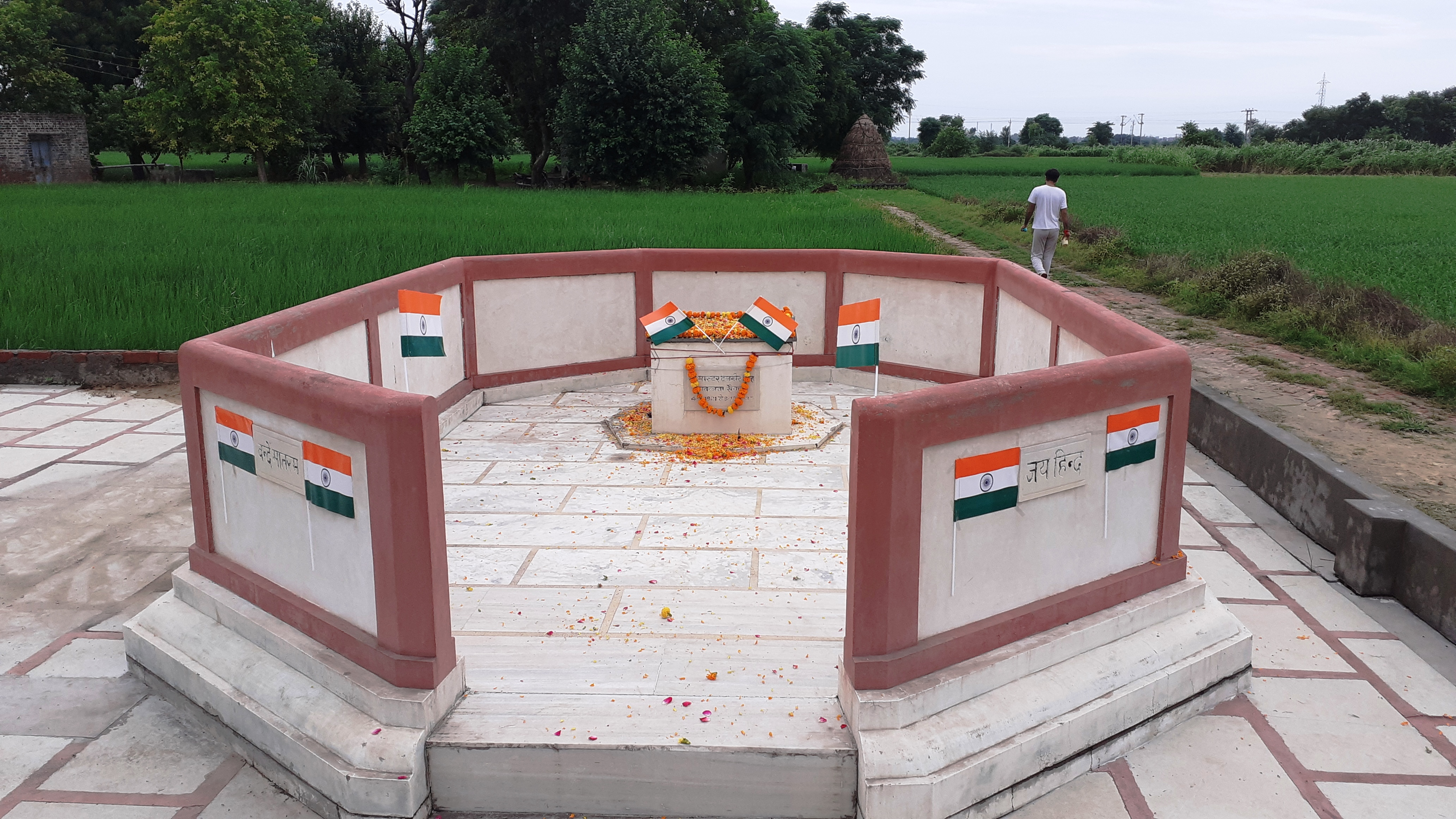
Tomb of freedom fighter Dalbir Singh Smadhi

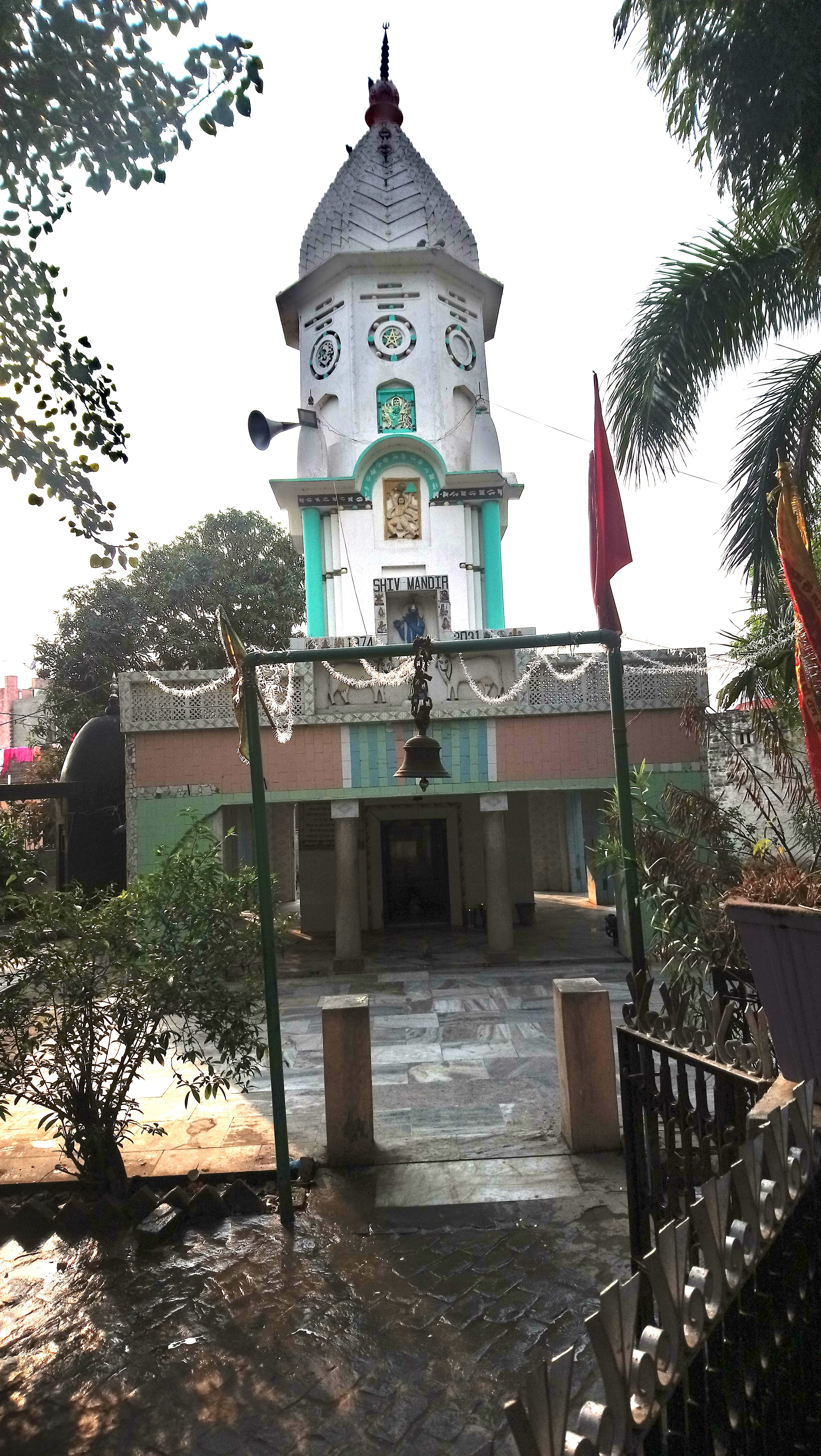
Shiv Mandir Bhodwal Majri

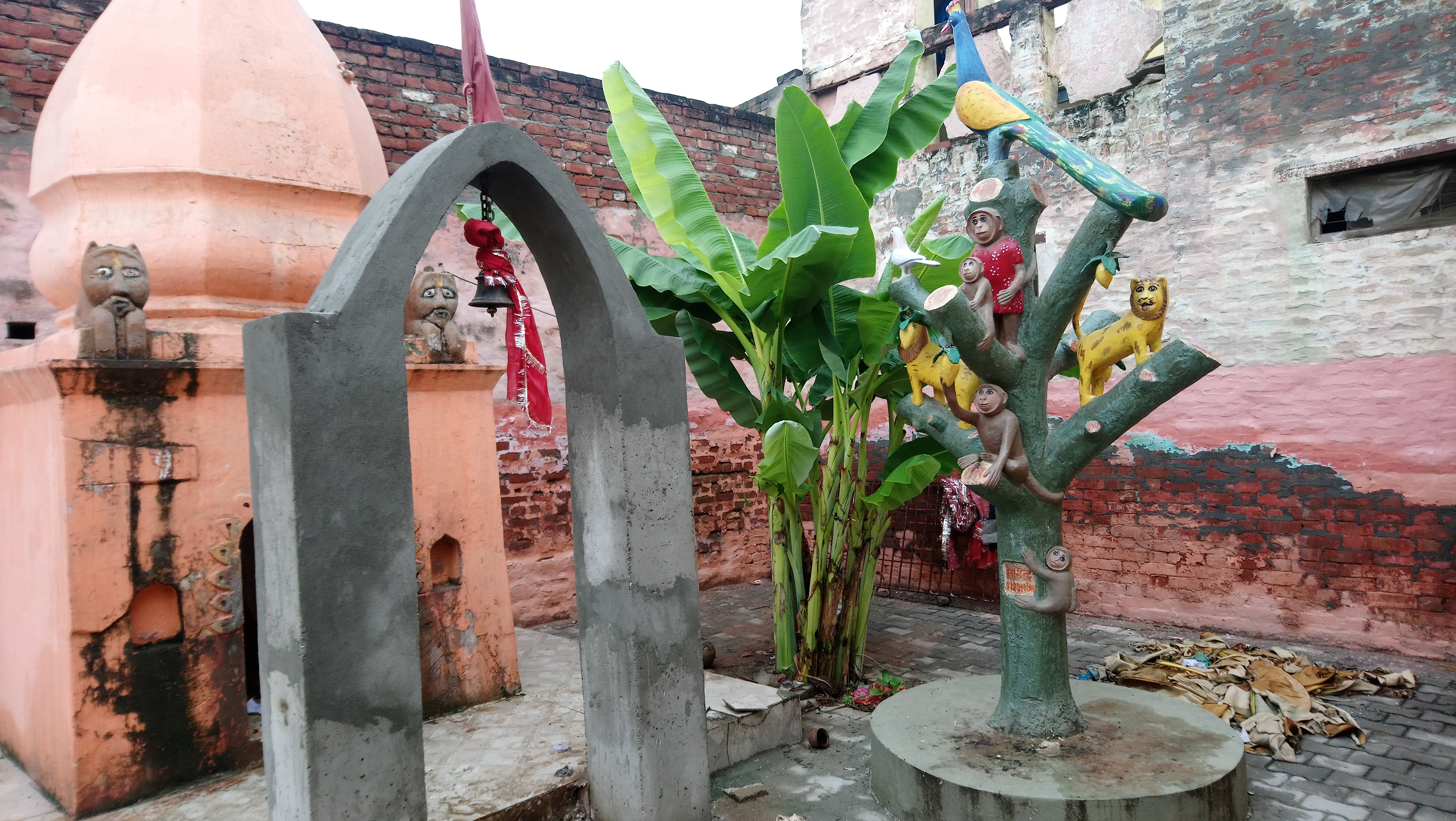
Mata Mandir

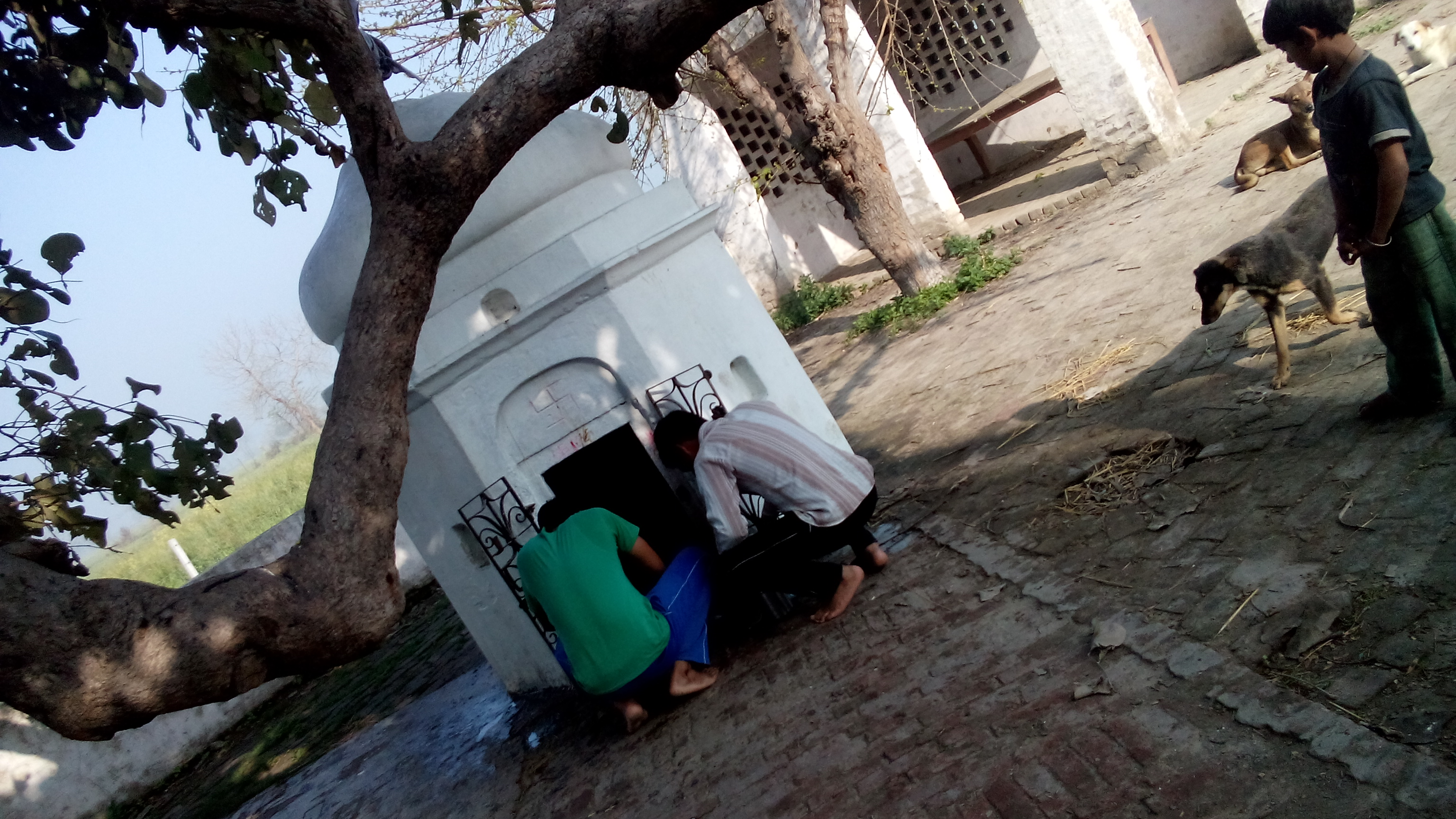
Baba Kali Singh

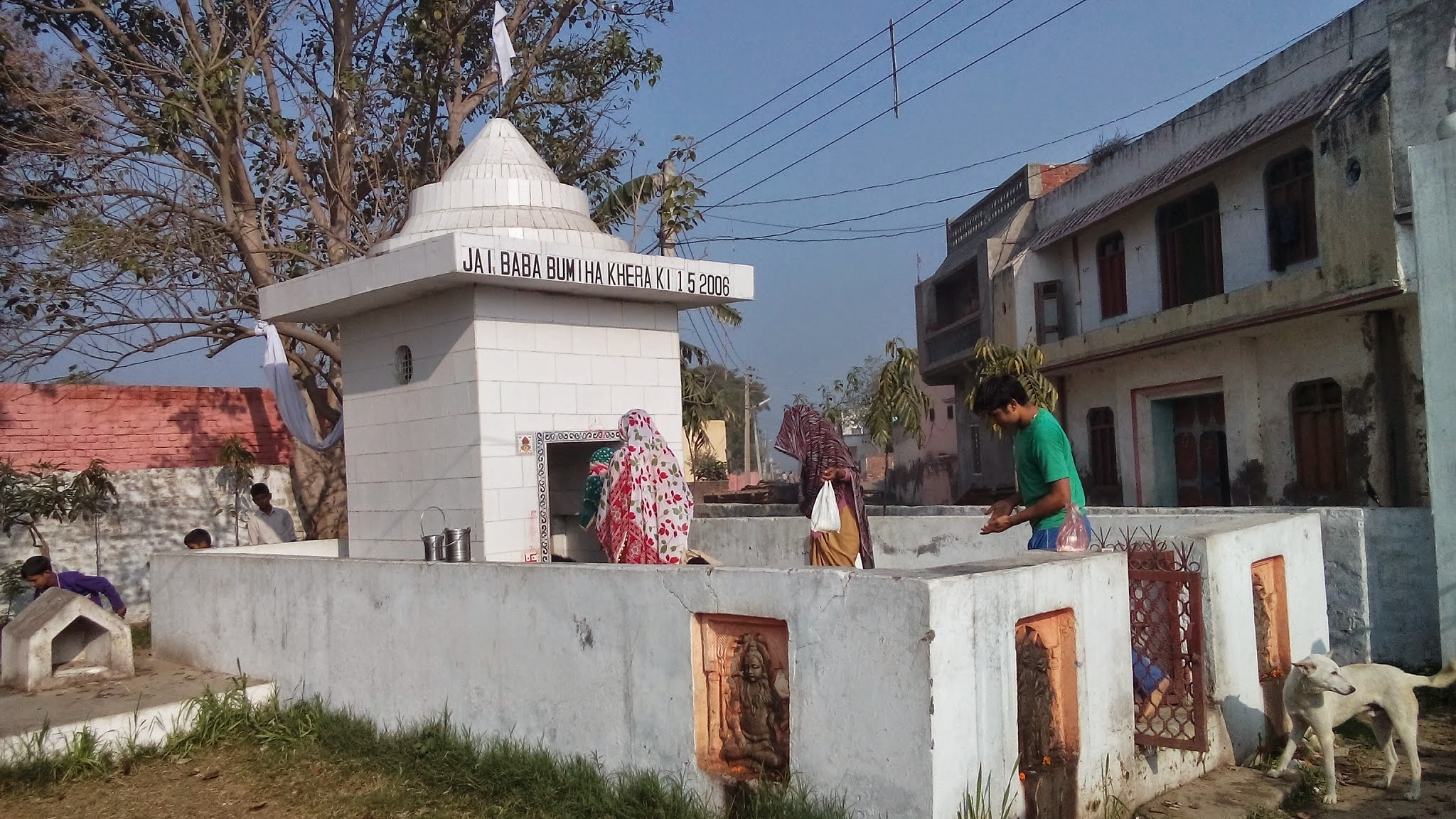
Baba Bumiha Khera
