= Patti Kalyana =

Patti Kalyana is a village in the Panipat district of Haryana, India. It is located along National Highway 44. The village was founded in 10th century AD.

Patti Kalyana is part of the 24 Chhokar clan villages. This village has its origin from nearby village Chulkana and was established by Ch. Chuhar Singh. Chhokar clan belongs to the ancient Gurjar tribe. Most of the villagers are engaged in agriculture with some working in government and private sector. The village has also given few IAS,IPS.

Politicians from Patti Kalyana include Ch. katar Singh Chhokkar(ex Finance Minister Haryana Govt), Ravinder Chhokar(eminent person CM window in charge )(son of katar singh Chhokar), Sanjay Chhokar ( ex MLA contestant from Congress ) Late. Professor Jagdeep S. Chhokar founding member of ADR (Association for democratic Reforms) also hails from the village.
