= Rahara =

Rahara may refer to:

- Rahara, Ireland
- Rahara, Kolkata, West Bengal, India
- Rahara, Karnal, Haryana, India
