= Dhandlan =

Village in Jhajjar (Haryana), India

Dhandhlan
- Village
- Location in Haryana, India Dhandhlan (India)
- Country: India
- State: Haryana
- Region: North India
- District: Jhajjar
- Founder: Ch. Dhandu Ahlawat

Languages
  - Official: Hindi
- Time zone: UTC+5:30 (IST)
- PIN: 124107
- ISO 3166 code: IN-HR
- Vehicle registration: HR-14
- Website: haryana.gov.in

Dhandlan is a village panchayat located in the Jhajjar district of Haryana state, India, near Dighal. Chandigarh is the state capital for Dhandhlan village. It is located around 222.4 kilometers away from Dhandhlan. The nearest state capital to Dhandhlan is Delhi, at a distance of 58.5 km. It is a village of Ahlawat Jats .

== Villages of Beri ==
- Achhej - Baghpur - Bakra - Berhana Gugnan - Berhana Milwan - Bhagal Puri - Bhambewah - Bishan - Chamanpura - Chhochi - Chimni - Dhandlan - Dharana - Dighal - Dimana - Dubaldhan Bidhan - Dubaldhan- Ghikan - Dubaldhan- Kirman - Gangtan - Gochhi - Godhri - Jahaj Garh - Lakria - Madana Kalan - Madana Khurd - Majra D (bhiman) - Majra- Dubaldhan - Malikpur - Mangawas - Mohammudpur Majra - Paharipur - Palra - Safipur - Seria - Siwana - Wazirpur.

Dhandhlan is a village of Ahlawat Khap Panchyat. Literacy rate is very high. High School, Veterinary Dispensary and Dispensary are functional units in village. The village has given many officers to Indian army & Civil Servants. Many Medical Graduates arefrom this village. Village commands a good reputation in area. People from this village participated in freedom struggle. Income Tax Commissioner Dr Devender Ahlawat, Vikas Ahlawat, Engineering Service (Civil) and GATE topper, recently selected IES Chitra Ahlawat are from this village. Professor Shyma, Dr Sajjan Singh Principal Scientist and Ex Member Veterinary Council of India are from this great village. Bhupender Ahlawat current Administrative officer in New India Assurance also hails from this village.DTU electronics and communications engineer Siddhant Ahlawat is also from Dhandlan village.
