= Shubham Jaglan =

Indian professional golfer (born 2004)

Personal information
- Nationality: India
- Born: 16 August 2004 (age 22) Israna, Panipat, Haryana, India

Career
- Sport: Golf
- College: University of South Florida
- Turned professional: 2025
- Current tours: Asian Tour; Professional Golf Tour of India
- Former tour: PGA Tour Americas
- Professional wins: 1

Achievements and awards
- NDTV - Emerging Player award: 2013
- Margdarshan Award: 2013

Shubham Jaglan (born 16 August 2004) is an Indian professional golfer who won the Junior World Golf Championships in 2015. Jaglan is also World Record holder, 9 under in Classic Junior Open, 2012 and is recipient of the "NDTV – Emerging Player" and "Margdarshan" awards. Jaglan has won over 100 domestic and international tournaments.

== Early life ==
Jaglan was born in village Israna, Panipat district, Haryana. His father is a milkman by profession and his family practices Pehlwani. He received his primary education in his village and now studies at the Laxman Public School in Delhi.

== Amateur career ==
An NRI named Kapur Singh started a golf academy in Jaglan's village. Jaglan was enrolled into the academy by his grandfather. Against the wishes of his family and despite the academy shutting down, Jaglan continued his practice on a small piece of land in his backyard. This land was cleaned by his father and converted into a green with three holes. Most of Jaglan's formative training was self-taught from videos on YouTube.

He was later spotted by The Golf Foundation that gave him annual scholarship of INR 2.0 lakh and a membership in the Delhi Golf Club, which in turn helped the father and son to relocate to Delhi to continue his training.

Jaglan played college golf in the United States at the University of South Florida from 2021 to 2025 winning once among eight top-10 finishes in 45 starts.

== Professional career ==
Jaglan turned professional in 2025. He played on the PGA Tour Americas in 2025 and the Professional Golf Tour of India in 2026. His first professional win came at the 2026 COAL India Open.

== Amateur wins ==
- 2013 World Masters of Junior Golf
- 2015 Junior World Golf Championships
- 2016 European Junior Championship
- 2017 Tamil Nadu Juniors
- 2018 Samarvir Sahi Amateur
- 2019 Northern India Amateur Championship
- 2021 Young Master Tour Links Classic
- 2025 Linger Longer Invitational

== Professional wins (1) ==
=== Professional Golf Tour of India wins (1) ===
No.	Date	Tournament	Winning score	Margin of victory	Runner-up
1	14 Aug 2026	Coal India Open	−14 (67-65-64=196) (Note: Shortened to 54 holes due to weather.)	2 strokes	(Bangladesh) Jamal Hossain
