= Pahladpur khalila =

Coordinates: 29°17′N 76°58′E

Pahladpur khalila is a village situated in Panipat tehsil of Panipat district in the Indian state of Haryana.
