= Pundir =

Pundir or Pundhir may refer to:

- Pundir Rajputs, a Rajput clan of Rajasthan, India

People

- Diwakar Pundir (born 1975), Indian actor and model
- Sahdev Singh Pundir, Indian politician
- Sher Singh Rana or Pankaj Singh Pundir (born 1976), Indian politician
- Shubham Pundir (born 1998), Indian cricketer
