= Yakuza (disambiguation) =

Yakuza refers to traditional organized crime groups in Japan and members thereof.

Yakuza may also refer to:

- The Yakuza, a 1974 film by Sydney Pollack
- Yakuza Fury a 2005 video game and part of the Simple series
- Like a Dragon (franchise), a series of video games by Sega known as Yakuza outside Japan until 2022
  - Yakuza (video game), the first game in the series, released in 2005
- Yakuza (band), an avant-garde metal band from Chicago
- "Yakuza" (song), a 2025 song by Elodie and Sfera Ebbasta
- Yakuza, a French comic by François Corteggiani

== See also ==
- Yakuza film, or yakuza eiga, the Japanese film genre depicting organized crime
- Yakuza (vehicle company) - Indian electric two-wheeler manufacturer.
