= Hemda =

- village
- Location in Haryana, India Hemda (India)
- Coordinates: 29.681514°N 76.905466°E
- Country: India
- State: Haryana
- District: Karnal

Area
  - Total: 5 km^{2} (1.9 sq mi)

Population (2012)
  - Total: 500
  - Density: 100/km^{2} (260/sq mi)

Languages
  - Official: Hindi
- Time zone: UTC+5:30 (IST)
- PIN: 132001
- Telephone code: 01745
- ISO 3166 code: IN-HR
- Vehicle registration: HR-05, HR-45
- Nearest city: Karnal
- Literacy: 80%
- Lok Sabha constituency: Karnal
- Vidhan Sabha constituency: Assandh
- Website: haryana.gov.in

Hemda is a village in Karnal district of state Haryana, India. It is located on SH-8 between Karnal to Kaithal.

== Overview ==
Hemda is a village in Karnal district, India. It is located just 9 km from Karnal. The village has a history of more than 100 years. It is a small village with a population of over 500. There is one middle school and two Choupals in the village.

The main profession of people is agriculture. All of the agricultural lands are owned by RORs. The soil is alluvial in nature and highly fertile. The literacy rate is more than 80% and few people are in government jobs. The population mainly consists of Hindus only mainly RORs and Dalits. The village has its own Panchayat, consisting of 6 Panchayat members and a Sarpanch. Randhir Singh is the Nambardaar of the village. Balbir Singh was declared as the most progressive farmer in the Karnal District. The village has all basic facilities like good transportation links, good water supply, clean streets with street lights and has a Govt Middle School established in 1973.

Also, the village has an old-age home and an Aanganwadi Kendra.
