= Abubshahar Wildlife Sanctuary =

Protected area in Haryana, India

- Location within Haryana Location within India
- Interactive map of Abubshahar Wildlife Sanctuary
- Location: Sirsa district, Haryana, India
- Coordinates: 29.8643°N 74.6172°E
- Area: 115.3 km^{2} (44.5 sq mi)
- Established: 1987

Abubshahar Wildlife Sanctuary is situated in Sirsa district of Haryana state, India. It is spread over an area of 11530.56 hectares. It is 15 km away from Mandi Dabwali on the Dabwali-Sangariya road. Forests Department, Haryana of Government of Haryana officially notified this as Wildlife Sanctuary on 30 January 1987.

The plan is to change the status of this sanctuary into a Community Reserve, in order to ensure the participation of the local population in the plan for the protection of flora and fauna. Eleven villages gravitate to this area.

== Location ==
It is located 10 km from Mandi Dabwali on Dabawali-Sangaria road at location map.

== Area ==
The sanctuary is spread over 11,530.56 hectares, which is approximately 29,000 acres.

== Images of type of wildlife found ==
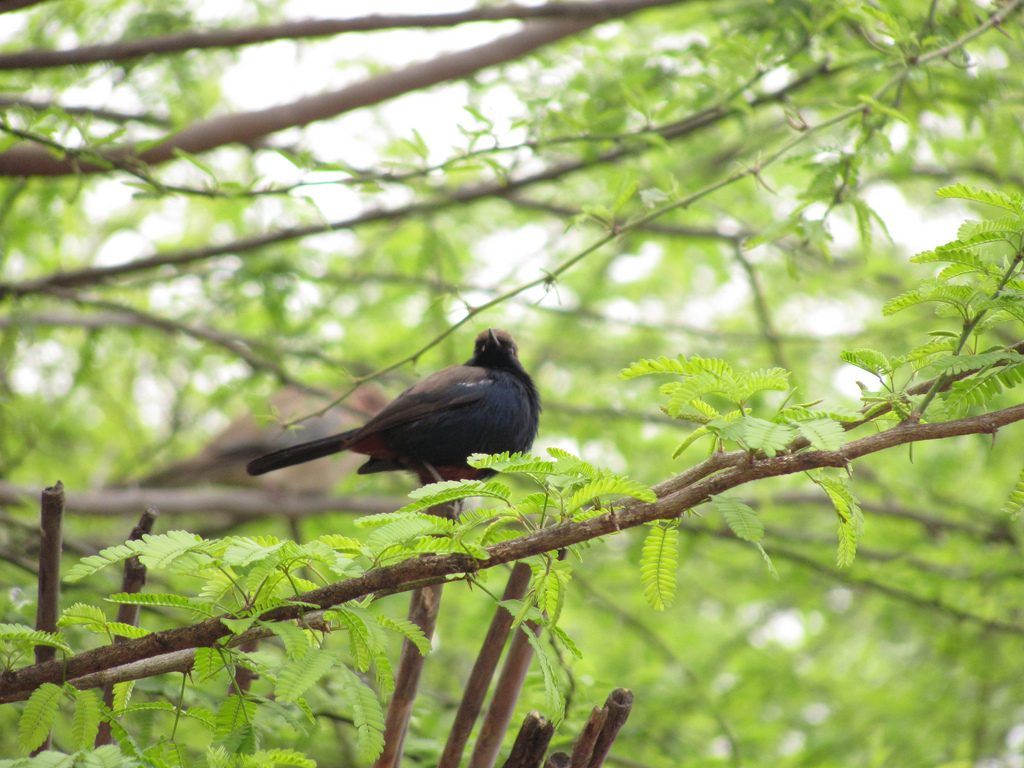
Saxicoloides Fulicatus

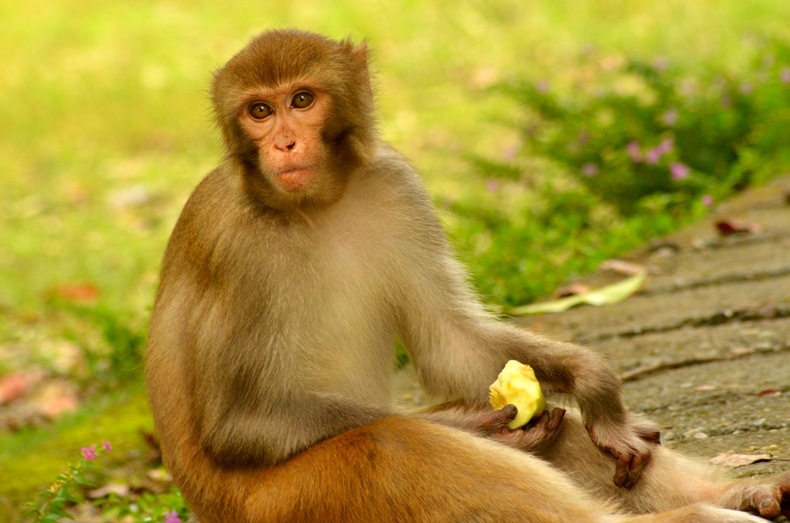
Bandar (Monkey)

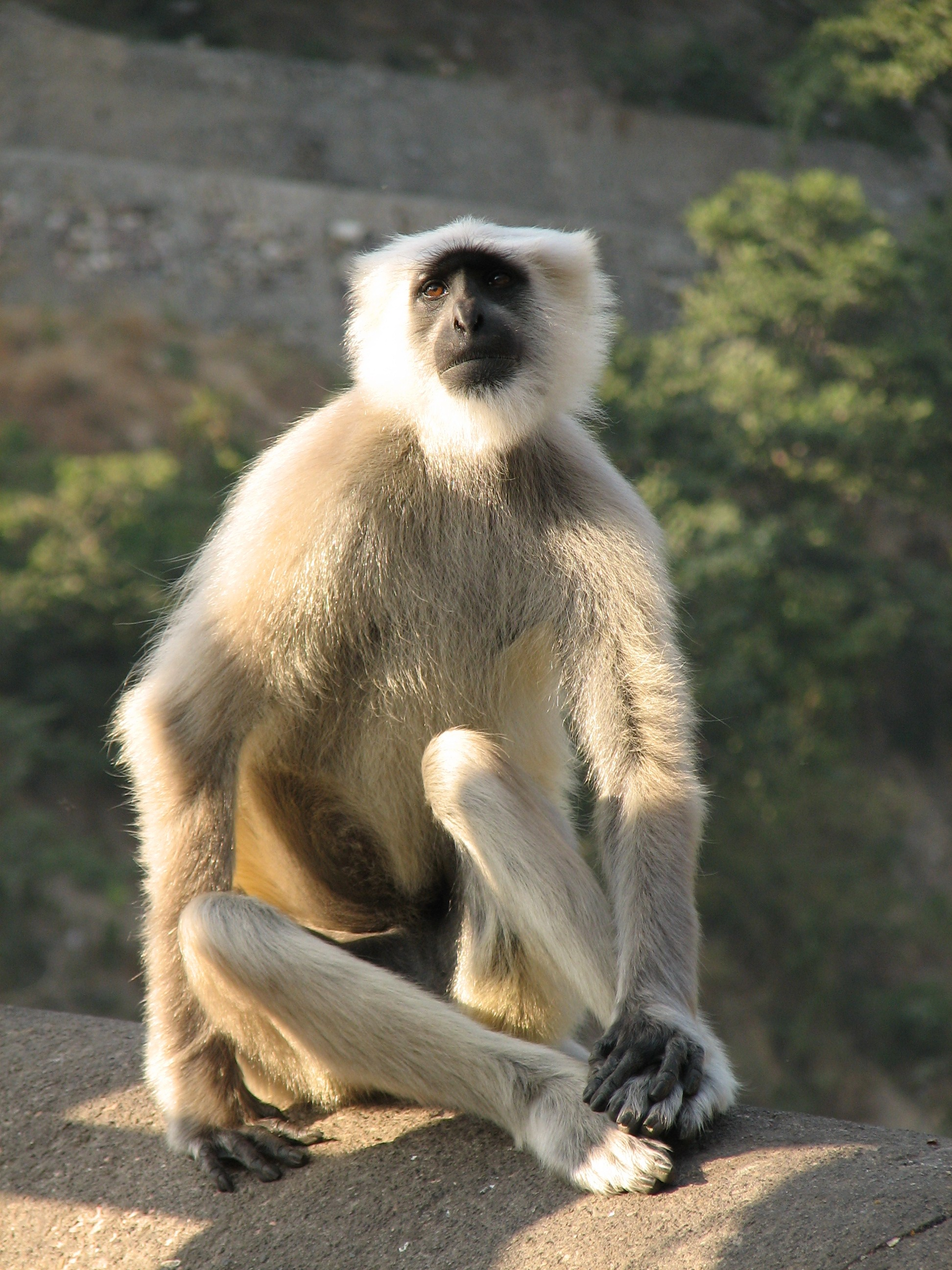
Langur Monkey

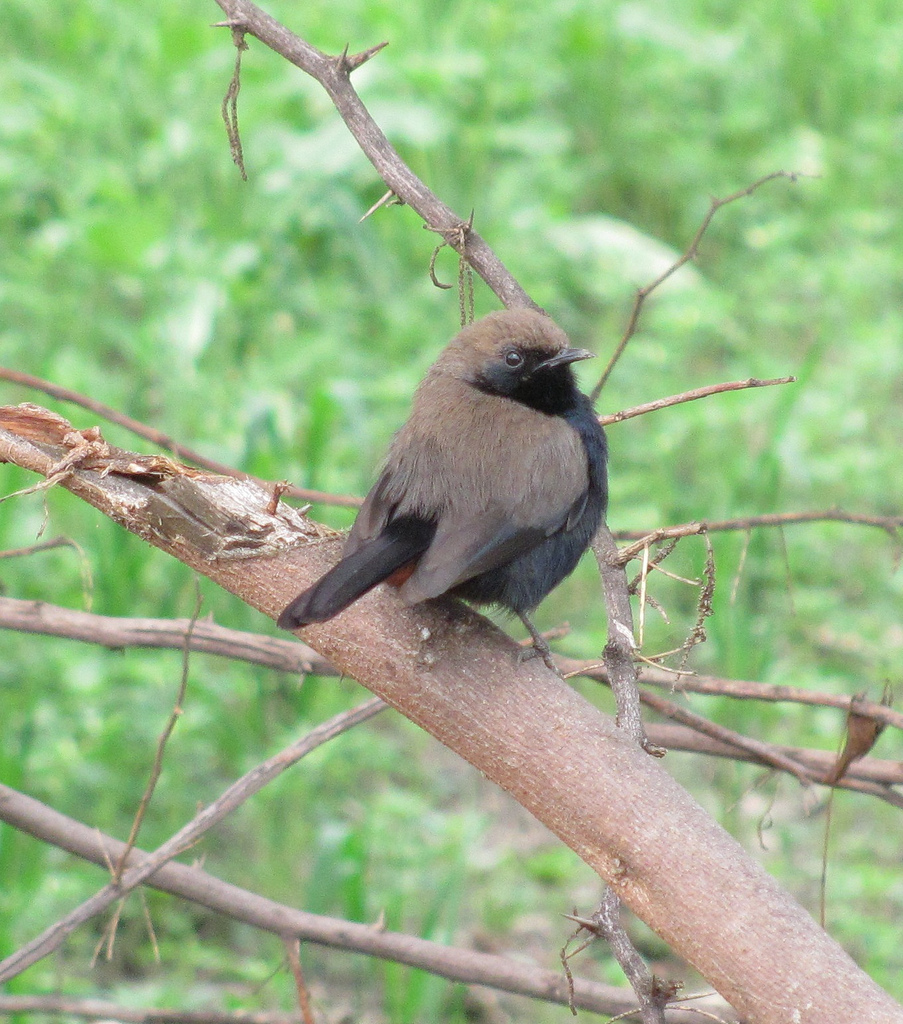
Small black bird

== Nearby attractions ==
- Fort of King Saras in Sirsa

== See also ==
- List of National Parks & Wildlife Sanctuaries of Haryana, India
- Haryana Tourism
- List of Monuments of National Importance in Haryana
- List of State Protected Monuments in Haryana
- List of Indus Valley civilization sites in Haryana, Punjab, Rajasthan, Gujarat, India and Pakistan
