= Madlauda =

Township near Panipat District of Haryana in India

Madlauda is a human settlement near Panipat City of Panipat district of Haryana, India. Population of this town is approximately 15,000 as per reports in 2019.

Madlauda acts as a junction between the rail and road tracks connecting Rajasthan with Haryana via Jind. The railway station of Madlauda was built in early 1800 by East India Company to transport goods across the state. Electric trains connect to Jind and Panipat in each direction and borders approximately 50 small villages making it a main connecting point for these villages to big cities like Panipat

An individual from Madlauda authored a book titled The Life of Tolka, which recounts their experiences during the Russian invasion of Ukraine in 2022, including their escape from the conflict. The book also highlights Operation Ganga, an evacuation mission carried out by the Government of India under the leadership of Prime Minister Narendra Modi, aimed at rescuing Indian nationals from Ukraine.

== Notable people ==
- Krishan Lal Panwar - Minister of transport in Government of Haryana
