= Israna Assembly constituency =

Legislative Assembly constituency in Haryana State, India

Coordinates: 29.28°N 76.85°E

- Constituency No. 26 for the Haryana Legislative Assembly

Constituency details
- Country: India
- Region: North India
- State: Haryana
- District: Panipat
- Lok Sabha constituency: Karnal
- Established: 2009
- Total electors: 1,83,775
- Reservation: SC

Member of Legislative Assembly
- 15th Haryana Legislative Assembly
- Incumbent Krishan Lal Panwar
- Party: BJP
- Elected year: 2024

Israna is one of the 90 Legislative Assembly constituencies of Haryana state in India.

It is part of Panipat district and is reserved for candidates belonging to the Scheduled Castes. As of 2019, its representative is Krishan Lal Panwar of the Bhartiya Janata Party party.

== Members of the Legislative Assembly ==
Year	Member	Party
Till 2009: Constituency did not exist
2009	Krishan Lal Panwar	Indian National Lok Dal
2014	Krishan Lal Panwar	Bharatiya Janata Party
2019	Balbir Singh	Indian National Congress
2024	Krishan Lal Panwar	Bharatiya Janata Party

== Election results ==
=== Assembly Election 2024 ===
2024 Haryana Legislative Assembly election: Israna
Party	Candidate	Votes	%	±%
BJP	Krishan Lal Panwar	67,538	52.09	▲19.60
INC	Balbir Singh	53,643	41.37	▼6.84
Independent	Rakesh Saroha	4,283	3.30	New
Independent	Satyawan Shera	1,652	1.27	New
INLD	Surajbhan	1,007	0.78	▼0.13
AAP	Amit Kumar	825	0.64	New
NOTA	None of the Above	287	0.22	▼0.21
Margin of victory		13,895	10.72	▼5.00
Turnout		1,29,654	70.62	▼2.08
Registered electors		1,83,775		▲4.84
BJP gain from INC		Swing	▲3.88	

=== Assembly Election 2019 ===
2019 Haryana Legislative Assembly election: Israna
Party	Candidate	Votes	%	±%
INC	Balbir Singh	61,376	48.21	▲17.11
BJP	Krishan Lal Panwar	41,361	32.49	▼0.09
JJP	Dayanand Urlana	17,735	13.93	
LSP	Usha Atkan	2,697	2.12	
BSP	Sunita Sabharwal (Joshi)	1,725	1.35	▼2.28
INLD	Ravi Kalsan Bandh	1,155	0.91	▼29.52
NOTA	Nota	551	0.43	
Margin of victory		20,015	15.72	▲14.24
Turnout		1,27,311	72.69	▼4.28
Registered electors		1,75,134		▲9.02
INC gain from BJP		Swing	▲15.63	

=== Assembly Election 2014 ===
2014 Haryana Legislative Assembly election: Israna
Party	Candidate	Votes	%	±%
BJP	Krishan Lal Panwar	40,277	32.58	▲31.45
INC	Balbir Singh	38,449	31.10	▼12.87
INLD	Balwan Balmiki	37,615	30.42	▼15.85
BSP	Rakesh Saroha	4,495	3.64	▼1.74
CPI	Kirshan	926	0.75	▼0.35
Margin of victory		1,828	1.48	▼0.82
Turnout		1,23,641	76.97	▲3.35
Registered electors		1,60,638		▲24.63
BJP gain from INLD		Swing	▼13.69	

=== Assembly Election 2009 ===
2009 Haryana Legislative Assembly election: Israna
Party	Candidate	Votes	%	±%
INLD	Krishan Lal Panwar	43,905	46.27	
INC	Balbir Singh	41,725	43.97	
BSP	Kuldeep	5,102	5.38	
BJP	Satpal S/O Bhagtu	1,065	1.12	
CPI	Krishan Lal Lohari	1,042	1.10	
HJC(BL)	Rakesh Saroha	1,007	1.06	
Margin of victory		2,180	2.30	
Turnout		94,893	73.62	
Registered electors		1,28,894		
INLD win (new seat)				

== See also ==
- List of constituencies of the Haryana Legislative Assembly
- Panipat district
