= Bakhshish Singh Virk =

Indian politician

Member of Haryana Legislative Assembly
- In office 2014–2019
- Preceded by: Zile Ram Chochra
- Succeeded by: Shamsher Singh Gogi
- Constituency: Assandh

Personal details
- Born: 27 July 1957 (age 69) Behlalpur, Karnal, Haryana, India
- Party: Bharatiya Janata Party
- Spouse: Davinder Kour
- Children: 2
- Profession: Farmer; commission agent

Bakhshish Singh Virk (born 27 July 1957) is an Indian politician and a former Bhartiya Janata Party MLA from Assandh (Haryana) constituency. He defeated Bahujan Samaj Party's Maratha Virender Verma by 4,608 votes in 2014 Haryana Legislative Assembly election.

In August 2017, Virk was charged with attacking a media personnel.

== Personal life ==
Virk was born to Gulab Singh Virk in Behlalpur village in Karnal district of Haryana. He did his matriculation from Govt. Senior Secondary School, Kachhwa in April 1973. He is married to Davinder Kour with whom he has a son and a daughter. He is a resident of Assandh.

== See also ==
- Haryana Legislative Assembly
- 2014 Haryana Legislative Assembly election

Political offices
Preceded by Zile Ram Chochra	MLA for Assandh; 20 October 2014 – present	Succeeded by Incumbent
