= Puthar =

Coordinates: 28°58′N 77°23′E

Puthar is a village in Israna tehsil in Panipat district in Haryana, India. It is located 6.9 kilometres (4.3 mi) from the village of Israna (the main village of the Israna tehsil), and 20.8 kilometres (12.9 mi) from Panipat. Puthar Pin Code is 132107.

Puthar is a medium size village with a population of approximately 2600.

The main attraction of village is Dada Kalisingh. There are two temples (Than) of Dadajee. One is near Govt. school, for the devotees and second one is in the Haveli of Pt. Parmanand Patwari.
