= Jabhala =

- village
- Location in Haryana, India Jabhala (India)
- Coordinates: 29.55°N 76.66°E
- Country: India
- State: Haryana
- District: Karnal
- Elevation: 237 m (778 ft)

Languages
  - Official: Hindi
- Time zone: UTC+5:30 (IST)
- Postal code: 132001
- Telephone code: +91-01745-XXXXXX
- Vehicle registration: HR-05
- Sex Ratio: 904:1000 ♂/♀
- Website: haryana.gov.in

Jabhala is a village in Assandh mandal in Karnal district of Haryana, India. It is about 2.85 km from the village of Rangrutti Khera.
