= Rangrutti Khera =

Village in Haryana, India

Rangrutti Khera is a village in mandal of Assandh in Karnal district of Haryana, India. It is located about 5 km from Assandh and 2.85 km from Jabhala.

== Nearby villages ==
- Jabhala
- Khanda Kheri
