= Gangatheri =

- village
- Location in Haryana, India Gangatheri (India)
- Country: India
- State: Haryana
- District: Karnal
- Established: 1165
- Founded by: GANGU PANDIT
- Named after: [Gangu Pandit]

Government
  - Type: GRAM PANCHAYAT

Area
  - Total: 4 km^{2} (1.5 sq mi)
- Elevation: 237 m (778 ft)

Population (2001)
  - Total: 3,100
  - Density: 770/km^{2} (2,000/sq mi)

Languages
  - Official: Hindi
- Time zone: UTC+5:30 (IST)
- Postal code: 132039
- Telephone code: 01749-XXXXXX
- Vehicle registration: HR-40
- Sex Ratio: 904:1000 ♂/♀
- Website: haryana.gov.in

Gangatheri is a village and gram panchayat in Assandh, Karnal district, Haryana, India. Its 1991 population was 2628. It belongs to karnal Division . It is located 57 KM towards west from District head quarters Karnal. 12 KM from Assandh. 160 KM from State capital Chandigarh

It is an ancient village that was in the state of Punjab and became part of Haryana after its separation in 1966. It was established in 1165 before the Mughal era by a person called Gangu.

Bahari (4 KM), Ardana (6 KM), Thall (7 KM), Bandrala (9 KM), Kheri Sharf Ali (12 KM) are the nearby Villages to Gangatheri. Alewa Village of District Jind (4 KM), Gangatheri is surrounded by Pillukhera Tehsil towards South, Assandh Tehsil towards East, Safidon Tehsil towards East, Rajound Tehsil towards North .

Assandh, Safidon, Jind, Kaithal are the near by Cities to Gangatheri.

Gangatheri is at the border of the Karnal District and Kaithal District. Kaithal District Rajound is to the north . Also it is in the Border of other district Jind .

3305	Population
629	Total No of Houses
46.9 % (1551)	Female Population %
61.7 % (2040)	Total Literacy rate %
24.5 % (811)	Female Literacy rate
0.0 % (0)	Scheduled Tribes Population %
23.1 % (765)	Scheduled Caste Population %
39.8 %	Working Population %
400	Child(0 -6) Population by 2011
48.0 % (192)	Girl Child(0 -6) Population % by 2011
