= Shamsher Singh Gogi =

Indian politician (born 1956)

Member of Haryana Legislative Assembly
- In office 2019–2024
- Preceded by: Bakhshish Singh Virk
- Succeeded by: Yogender Singh Rana
- Constituency: Assandh

Personal details
- Party: Indian National Congress
- Profession: Politician

Shamsher Singh Gogi (born 18 September 1956) is an Indian politician from Haryana. He is an MLA from Assandh Assembly constituency in Karnal district. He won the 2019 Haryana Legislative Assembly election representing the Indian National Congress. He is nominated again by the Congress party to contest the Assandh seat in the 2024 election.

== Early life and education ==
Singh is from Assandh, Karnal district, Haryana. He is the son of Raghbir Singh. He runs his own business. He completed B.A. and then did L.L.B. in 1980 at Kurukshetra University, Kurukshetra.

== Career ==
Singh won from Assandh Assembly constituency representing the Indian National Congress in the 2019 Haryana Legislative Assembly election. He defeated his nearest rival, Narendra Singh of the BSP, by a margin of 1,703 votes.
