= Assandh Assembly constituency =

Constituency of the Haryana legislative assembly in India

Coordinates: 29.52°N 76.60°E

- Constituency No. 23 for the Haryana Legislative Assembly

Constituency details
- Country: India
- Region: North India
- State: Haryana
- District: Karnal
- Lok Sabha constituency: Karnal
- Established: 1977
- Total electors: 2,42,795
- Reservation: None

Member of Legislative Assembly
- 15th Haryana Legislative Assembly
- Incumbent Yogender Singh Rana
- Party: BJP
- Elected year: 2024

Assandh Assembly constituency is one of the 68 assembly constituencies of the Haryana Legislative Assembly in Haryana, an Indian state. Assandh is also part of Karnal Lok Sabha constituency.

Yogender Singh Rana is the current MLA from Assandh.

== Members of the Legislative Assembly ==
Year	Member	Party
1977	Jogi Ram	Janata Party
1982	Manphool Singh	Lok Dal
1987	Manphool Singh	Lok Dal
1991	Krishan Lal Panwar	Janata Party
1996	Krishan Lal Panwar	Samata Party
2000	Krishan Lal Panwar	Indian National Lok Dal
2005	Raj Rani Poonam	Indian National Congress
2009	Zile Ram Chochra	Haryana Janhit Congress
2014	Bakhshish Singh Virk	Bharatiya Janata Party
2019	Shamsher Singh Gogi	Indian National Congress
2024	Yogender Singh Rana	Bharatiya Janata Party

== Election results ==
=== Assembly Election 2024 ===
2024 Haryana Legislative Assembly election: Assandh
Party	Candidate	Votes	%	±%
BJP	Yoginder Singh Rana	54,761	33.74	▲15.14
INC	Shamsher Singh Gogi	52,455	32.32	▲11.38
BSP	Gopal Singh	27,396	16.88	▼2.95
Independent	Zile Ram Sharma	16,302	10.04	New
AAP	Amandeep Singh Jundla	4,290	2.64	New
NCP-SP	Maratha Virender Verma	4,218	2.60	New
NOTA	None of the Above	306	0.19	New
Margin of victory		2,306	1.42	▲0.31
Turnout		1,62,292	66.96	▼0.88
Registered electors		2,42,795		▲7.24
BJP gain from INC		Swing	▲12.80	

=== Assembly Election 2019 ===
2019 Haryana Legislative Assembly election: Assandh
Party	Candidate	Votes	%	±%
INC	Shamsher Singh Gogi	32,114	20.94	▲12.02
BSP	Narender Singh	30,411	19.83	▲3.31
BJP	Bakhshish Singh Virk	28,518	18.60	▼0.84
Independent	Zile Ram Chochra	25,137	16.39	
Independent	Sanjay Kumar	14,212	9.27	
JJP	Brij Sharma	13,756	8.97	
INLD	Dharmvir Padha	2,610	1.70	▼12.97
LSP	Manjeet Singh	1,873	1.22	
Sarva Hit Party	Master Satyavan Turan	1,673	1.09	
Independent	Harjeet Singh	1,300	0.85	
Margin of victory		1,703	1.11	▼1.81
Turnout		1,53,329	67.84	▼9.64
Registered electors		2,26,029		▲10.82
INC gain from BJP		Swing	▲1.50	

=== Assembly Election 2014 ===
2014 Haryana Legislative Assembly election: Assandh
Party	Candidate	Votes	%	±%
BJP	Bakhshish Singh Virk	30,723	19.44	▲7.32
BSP	Maratha Virender Verma	26,115	16.53	▲6.12
INLD	Yashbir Rana (Kuku)	23,191	14.67	▲3.74
Independent	Yashpal Singh Rana	17,098	10.82	
INC	Sumita Singh	14,103	8.92	▼2.93
Independent	Zile Ram Chochra	12,962	8.20	
Independent	Brijendra Mann	12,894	8.16	
Independent	Jagdish Kumar	3,799	2.40	
Independent	Sher Partap Singh	3,762	2.38	
HJCPV	Subhash Sharma	2,328	1.47	
HLP	Krishan Lal	2,081	1.32	
Margin of victory		4,608	2.92	▲0.16
Turnout		1,58,033	77.48	▲2.38
Registered electors		2,03,966		▲19.41
BJP gain from HJC(BL)		Swing	▲3.64	

=== Assembly Election 2009 ===
2009 Haryana Legislative Assembly election: Assandh
Party	Candidate	Votes	%	±%
HJC(BL)	Zile Ram Chochra	20,266	15.80	
Independent	Raghbir Singh Virk	16,726	13.04	
Independent	Yashpal Singh Rana	15,685	12.23	
BJP	Bakhshish Singh Virk	15,546	12.12	▲6.12
INC	Ramesh Kumar Choudhary	15,208	11.85	▼37.57
BRP	Maratha Virender Verma	14,104	10.99	▲4.97
INLD	Prem Singh	14,026	10.93	▼25.05
BSP	Anil Rana	13,343	10.40	▲9.5
Independent	Ramphal Sharma	832	0.65	
CPI(M)	Baljit Singh	784	0.61	
Margin of victory		3,540	2.76	▼10.69
Turnout		1,28,288	75.10	▲2.84
Registered electors		1,70,814		▲32.32
HJC(BL) gain from INC		Swing	▼33.63	

=== Assembly Election 2005 ===
2005 Haryana Legislative Assembly election: Assandh
Party	Candidate	Votes	%	±%
INC	Raj Rani Poonam	46,109	49.43	▲21.81
INLD	Krishan Lal	33,564	35.98	▼21.98
BRP	Om Parkash	5,620	6.02	
BJP	Rajinder	5,594	6.00	
BSP	Lal Chand	838	0.90	▼0.6
CPI	Sube Singh	803	0.86	▼0.28
NCP	Rajpal	724	0.78	
Margin of victory		12,545	13.45	▼16.90
Turnout		93,284	72.26	▲7.43
Registered electors		1,29,087		▲9.28
INC gain from INLD		Swing	▼8.53	

=== Assembly Election 2000 ===
2000 Haryana Legislative Assembly election: Assandh
Party	Candidate	Votes	%	±%
INLD	Krishan Lal	44,392	57.96	
INC	Raj Rani	21,150	27.61	▲14.65
HVP	Om Parkash	7,430	9.70	▼24.87
Independent	Samer Singh	1,592	2.08	
BSP	Manoj Kumar	1,150	1.50	▼2.95
CPI	Krishan	875	1.14	
Margin of victory		23,242	30.35	▲27.01
Turnout		76,589	64.85	▲2.76
Registered electors		1,18,125		▼1.91
INLD gain from SAP		Swing	▲20.06	

=== Assembly Election 1996 ===
1996 Haryana Legislative Assembly election: Assandh
Party	Candidate	Votes	%	±%
SAP	Krishan Lal	28,333	37.90	
HVP	Rajinder Singh	25,840	34.57	▲20.09
INC	Jai Kumar	9,695	12.97	▼15.35
BSP	Ram Kumar	3,327	4.45	
JD	Geeta Ram	2,492	3.33	
Independent	Ved Pal	2,405	3.22	
AIIC(T)	Ram Dhari	1,283	1.72	
Janhit Morcha	Dharam Pal	690	0.92	
Margin of victory		2,493	3.33	▼10.16
Turnout		74,755	65.47	▲1.80
Registered electors		1,20,428		▲20.69
SAP gain from JP		Swing	▼3.91	

=== Assembly Election 1991 ===
1991 Haryana Legislative Assembly election: Assandh
Party	Candidate	Votes	%	±%
JP	Krishan Lal	25,144	41.81	
INC	Karam Chand	17,030	28.32	▲1.67
HVP	Gaje Singh	8,706	14.48	
BJP	Jeet Ram	3,751	6.24	
CPI	Surta Singh	2,203	3.66	
Independent	Sundra	1,751	2.91	
Independent	Jai Singh	451	0.75	
Margin of victory		8,114	13.49	▼26.31
Turnout		60,144	62.92	▼5.66
Registered electors		99,779		▲10.04
JP gain from LKD		Swing	▼24.64	

=== Assembly Election 1987 ===
1987 Haryana Legislative Assembly election: Assandh
Party	Candidate	Votes	%	±%
LKD	Manphool Singh	39,730	66.45	▲8.81
INC	Sarwan Kumar	15,934	26.65	▲0.46
Independent	Ramdhari	1,235	2.07	
Independent	Geeta Ram	602	1.01	
Independent	Satnam	540	0.90	
VHP	Gaje Singh	486	0.81	
Independent	Chander Bhan	420	0.70	
Margin of victory		23,796	39.80	▲8.35
Turnout		59,792	66.88	▲9.60
Registered electors		90,674		▲18.37
LKD hold		Swing	▲8.81	

=== Assembly Election 1982 ===
1982 Haryana Legislative Assembly election: Assandh
Party	Candidate	Votes	%	±%
LKD	Manphool Singh	24,880	57.64	
INC	Jogi Ram	11,304	26.19	▲13.45
Independent	Rajinder Kumar	2,343	5.43	
Independent	Ram Diya	1,470	3.41	
JP	Risal Singh	689	1.60	▼71.06
Independent	Tara Singh	477	1.11	
Independent	Dhan Pat	438	1.01	
Independent	Gaje Singh	282	0.65	
Independent	Jarnail Singh	266	0.62	
Independent	Kalawati	250	0.58	
Independent	Kundan	250	0.58	
Margin of victory		13,576	31.45	▼28.46
Turnout		43,164	57.17	▲7.40
Registered electors		76,605		▲20.88
LKD gain from JP		Swing	▼15.01	

=== Assembly Election 1977 ===
1977 Haryana Legislative Assembly election: Assandh
Party	Candidate	Votes	%	±%
JP	Jogi Ram	22,537	72.65	
INC	Karam Chand	3,953	12.74	
Independent	Jai Kumar	1,435	4.63	
Independent	Kali Ram	927	2.99	
Independent	Ratna	879	2.83	
Independent	Giasu Ram	619	2.00	
Independent	Badlu Ram	315	1.02	
VHP	Satnam Singh	269	0.87	
Margin of victory		18,584	59.91	
Turnout		31,020	49.53	
Registered electors		63,371		
JP win (new seat)				

== See also ==
- Assandh
- Karnal district
- Karnal (Lok Sabha constituency)
