= Zile Ram Chochra =

Indian politician

Member of Haryana Legislative Assembly
- In office 2009–2014
- Preceded by: Raj Rani Poonam
- Succeeded by: Bakhshish Singh Virk
- Constituency: Assandh

Personal details
- Political party: Indian National Congress
- Profession: Politician

Pandit Zil-e-Ram Chochra is an Indian politician and member of the Indian National Congress. Chochra was a member of the Haryana Legislative Assembly from the Assandh constituency in Karnal district.
