= Krishan Lal Panwar =

Indian politician

Cabinet Minister, Government of Haryana
- Incumbent
- Assumed office 17 October 2024
- Governor: Bandaru Dattatreya
- Chief Minister: Nayab Singh Saini
- Ministry and Departments: Development & Panchayat; Mines & Geology

Member of Parliament, Rajya Sabha
- In office 2020 – October 2024
- Constituency: Haryana

Member of Haryana Legislative Assembly
- Incumbent
- Assumed office 8 October 2024
- Preceded by: Balbir Singh
- Constituency: Israna Assembly constituency
- In office 2009–2019
- Preceded by: constituency created
- Succeeded by: Balbir Singh
- Constituency: Israna Assembly constituency
- In office 1991–2005
- Preceded by: Man Phool Singh
- Succeeded by: Raj Rani Poonam
- Constituency: Assandh Assembly constituency

Cabinet Minister, Government of Haryana
- Ministry: Term
- Minister of Jails: 22 July 2016 - 27 October 2019
- Minister of Transport: 24 July 2015 - 27 October 2019
- Minister of Housing: 24 July 2015 - 27 October 2019

Personal details
- Born: 1 January 1958 (age 68) Madlauda, Haryana, India
- Party: Bharatiya Janata Party
- Other political affiliations: Janata Party Samata Party Indian National Lok Dal
- Spouse: Hoshiari Devi
- Occupation: Politician

Krishan Lal Panwar is a senior politician from Haryana who is currently serving as Cabinet Minister of Panchayats & Development and Mines & Geology, Government of Haryana. He is a member of the Haryana Legislative Assembly from the BJP representing the Israna Assembly constituency in Haryana.
