= Rajli, Hisar =

Rajli
- village
- Location in Haryana, India Rajli (India)
- Coordinates: 29°17′13″N 75°52′8″E8
- Country: India
- State: Haryana
- District: Hisar
- Founder: Grewal

Government
  - Type: Panchayati rajli (India)
  - Body: Gram panchayat

Population
  - Total: 8,079

Languages Hindi
  - Official: Hindi
- Time zone: UTC+5:30 (IST)
- PIN: 125121 ko
- Vehicle registration: HR
- Website: haryana.gov.in

Rajli is a village in Barwala Tehsil and Hisar district in Haryana state of India. This village has total 1538 families residing. Rajli has population of 8089 as per government records.

== Administration ==
Rajli village is administrated by Sarpanch through its Gram Panchayat, who is elected representative of village as per constitution of India and Panchyati Raj Act.

Particulars	Total	Male	Female
Total No. of Houses	1538		
Population	8089	4315	3774
