= Rahara, Karnal =

Village in Haryana, India

Rahara is a village situated in Assandh tehsil of Karnal District in the state of Haryana, India. It is 10 km (6.2 mi) from Assandh Tehsil. The village has the second largest farming land in the district of Karnal, and a major occupation of villagers is agriculture. Assandh block has a total of 87 villages. People of different castes live in Rahara. Ror, Rajput, Brahmin, and Panchal are general castes.RAJPUTS are majority in village MADHAD gotra rajputs live in village The total population of village is around 24,000 and calculated votes are around 8,700.

People of the village are quite spiritual and there are 10-11 temples in the village. Of these temples, Nakhi Baba Temple is well-known and a center of attraction and faith. It is situated 2 km (1.2 mi) away from village and every Sunday people go there to worship. A cowhouse (gaushala) is also there. People of Rahara are divided into three Patti: Badra, Salu, and Theda Patti. These Patti have different behaviours.
