= Chulkana =

- village
- Location in Haryana, India Chulkana (India)
- Coordinates: 29.202434°N 76.986287°E
- Country: India
- State: Haryana
- District: Panipat district
- Established: 1 November 1966
- ISO 3166 code: IN-HR
- Website: haryana.gov.in

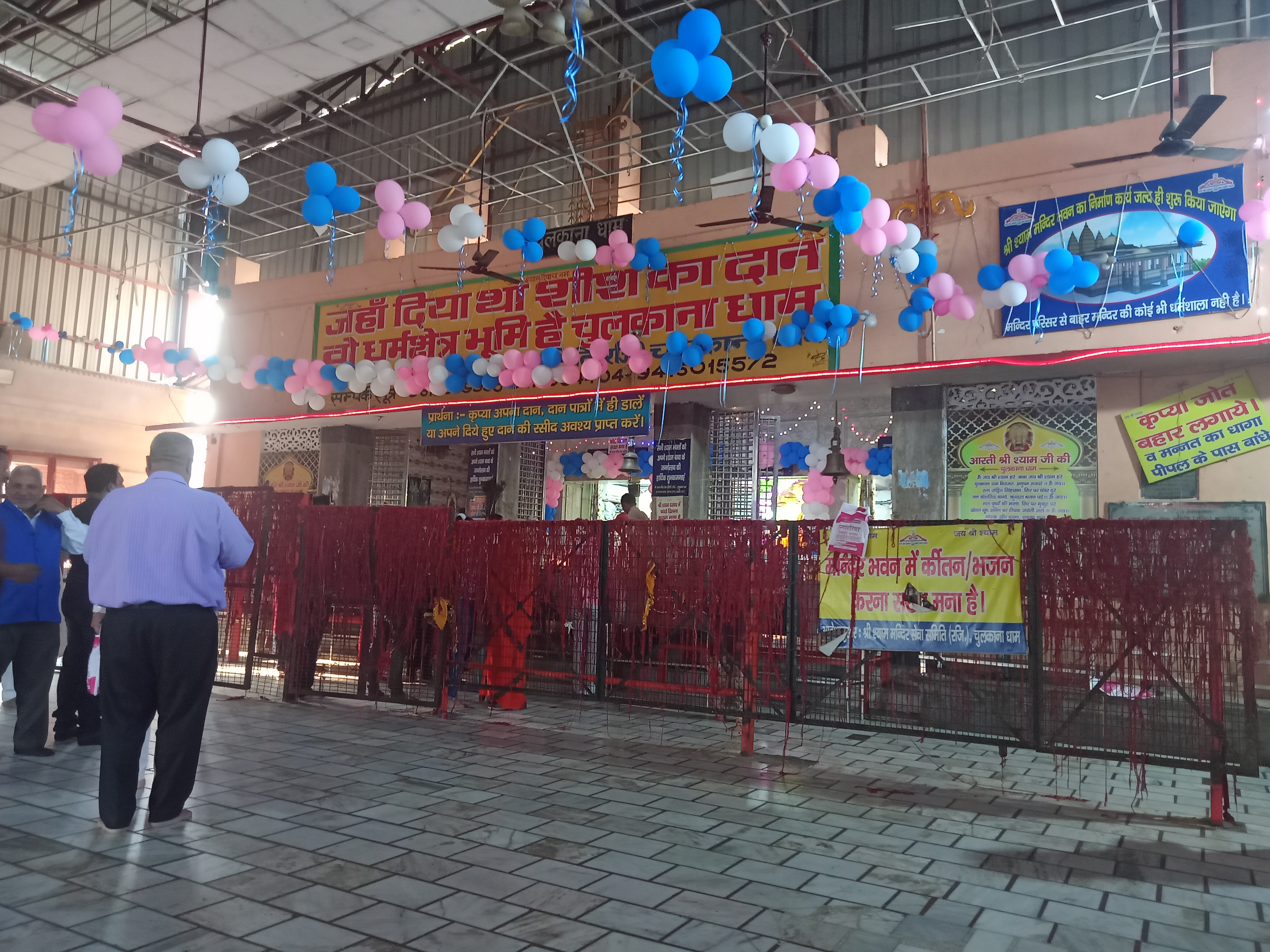
Shyam Baba Chulkana Dham

Chulkana is one of the 24 Chhoukker(Gurjar) village along with nearby villages of Chhoker khap Kiwana, Namunda, Naraina, Patti Kalyana situated in Haryana, India. It comes under district Panipat, municipality Samalkha. The village is situated 3.7 km away from Samalkha. The main landmark is the Baba Lakisher temple, situated in the center of the village. Chulkana has a large population with more than 20,000 residents.
