= Salwan, Haryana =

Village in Haryana, India

Salwan
- Village
- Salwam
- Location in Haryana, India Salwan (India)
- Coordinates: 29°30′23″N 76°43′02″E
- Country: India
- State: Haryana
- District: Karnal
- Founder: Raja Sahliwaan
- Named for: King Saalhiwaan

Government
  - Type: Village Panchayat

Population
  - Total: 18,500

Languages
  - Official: Hindi
- Time zone: UTC+5:30 (IST)
- PIN: 132046
- Telephone code: 01749
- ISO 3166 code: IN-HR
- Vehicle registration: HR 40
- Nearest city: Panipat, Assandh, Safidon, Karnal
- Lok Sabha constituency: Karnal
- Vidhan Sabha constituency: Assandh
- Climate: dry hot during summer with less rainfall (Köppen)
- Website: haryana.gov.in

Salwan is a village in Karnal District, Haryana, India. Apart from the Rajput community, Salwan is home to many other communities, including Jaats and Brahmins.
