= Nambardaar =

Term commonly used in Northern India and Pakistan for the head of a village

Nambardaar is a head of the village who is responsible for certifying land ownership records for governmental purposes, especially in India and Pakistan. This practice dates back to British rule in India. The Nambardaar is also responsible for certifying birth and death. He collects chula tax (family tax) or Abiana (water tax) for revenue department in Pakistan from the villagers/farmers and deposits it in the government exchequer. The Nambardaar keeps a fixed percentage of the collection as his income. Some people use the term Lambardaar for the same purpose.

== See also ==
- Patwari
- Tehsildar
