= Samalkha =

Town in Haryana, India

- Town
- Location in Haryana, India Samalkha (India)
- Coordinates: 29.23°N 77.02°E
- Country: India
- State: Haryana
- District: Panipat
- Elevation: 227 m (745 ft)

Population (2011)
  - Total: 40,000

Languages
  - Official: Hindi
- Time zone: UTC+5:30 (IST)
- PIN: 132101
- Telephone code: 0180
- ISO 3166 code: IN-HR
- Vehicle registration: HR-60
- Website: haryana.gov.in

Samalkha is a town and Sub district of Panipat district that has its own tehsil as well as a municipal committee located in Indian state of Haryana. It is situated on GT road, 19 km (11.7 miles) south of Panipat, the district headquarter and 72 kilometres (45 mi) from the national capital Delhi. It is center of politics in Haryana after Sohna in gurugram and Faridabad.

Industries in the town include textile yarns, cast iron, nuts and bolts, iron rods machine tools and bathroom fittings manufacture. There are about 82 villages in Samalkha block and 17 wards. Main villages are Mahawati, Dikadla, Dehra, Atta, Jaurasi, Shehrmalpur

== Geography ==
Samalkha has an average elevation of 227 metres (745 ft). It is situated on GT road, 19 km (11.7 miles) south of Panipat, 32 km north from Sonipat and 72 kilometres (45 mi) from the national capital Delhi, 136 km (84 miles) south of Ambala and 178 km (110 miles) southwest of Chandigarh.

== Connectivity ==
National Highway 44 (India) is a major road network that connects Samalkha to Grand Trunk road network.

Some of villages (like- Hathwala, Bilaspur, etc) of Samalkha are also connected to UP through the Yamuna River.

Samalkha is connected to all major Indian cities via Samalkha railway station

== Demographics ==
According to the 2011 India census, Samalkha had a population of 39,710. Males are 21,379 and females are 18,331. Samalkha has an average literacy rate of 78%, higher than the national average of 61.5%: male literacy is 78%, and female literacy is 69%. In Samalkha, 20% of the population is under 6 years of age.

Samalkha town is inhabited by outsiders mainly Gujjars, vaishyas, Punjabis and Jats.

== Market ==
Samalkha takes the position of ward no. 5 in Panipat. It is in possession of large grain, jaggery and wood markets, one of the largest markets is located in the state of Haryana. The market stretches for 1 km from the old bus stand/GT road to the railway station and features prominent companies in the polymer and bath fitting industries. It also receives a high influx of customers from neighboring districts like Baghpat or Uttar Pradesh.

== Industries ==
- Nestlé India Ltd, situated on Patikalyana-Kiwana Road.
- Daharia Polychem Industries Private Limited, HSIIDC, Samalkha (World renowned Yarn manufacturers)
- Cybronix Labs Private Limited - World leader Cyber Security and AI Solutions providers (@SecureT360)
- Continental Warehousing Corporation NS Ltd. D P WORLD Group, situated on NH 1 at Diwana, Haryana
- Haryana Organics Bear Factory, situated on Chulkana-Samalkha Road
- Jai Hind Iron Foundry, situated on GT Road Samalkha
- Shri Tirupati Steels, situated on HSIIDC Road Samalkha
- Bharat Trading Company, Shop No.155 situated in New Grain Market Samalkha.
- Ganpati Jewellers, Shop situated on railway road, Samalkha.

== Colleges ==
- Gandhi Adrash College, Chulkana Road
- Vaish Girls College, Samalkha
- Tau Devi Lal College of Education, Manana
- Samalkha Group of Institutions, Hathwala Road
- Panipat Institute of Engineering and Technology, near Pattikalyana, N.H. 44
- Geeta Institute of law, Karhans
