= Israna =

- town
- Location in Haryana, India Israna (India)
- Coordinates: 29°16′26″N 76°50′46″E
- Country: India
- State: Haryana
- District: Panipat district

Government
  - Type: Local government
  - Body: Panchayat

Area
  - Total: 14.65 km^{2} (5.66 sq mi)
- Elevation: 231 m (758 ft)

Population (2011)
  - Total: 9,472
  - Density: 646.6/km^{2} (1,675/sq mi)

Languages
  - Official: Hindi
- Time zone: UTC+5:30 (IST)
- PIN: 132107
- Telephone code: 0180
- Vehicle registration: HR-06, HR-60, HR-67
- Literacy: 74.17% (total); 83.55% (male); 63.75% (female)
- Sex ratio: 882 ♂/♀

Israna is a village panchayat and tehsil in Panipat district in Haryana, India. It lies in the panipat Division. It is located 18 kilometres (11 mi) towards south from district headquarters Panipat and 188 kilometres (117 mi) from state capital Chandigarh towards north.

== History ==
During Third Battle of Panipat at Kala Amb on 14 January 14, 1761 between Maratha warrior Sadashivrao Bhau and Afghan invader Ahmad Shah Abdali, Bhau camped at empty space near Israna and his army camped at Bhadar and Bhaupur village is named after Sadashivrao Bhau. Maratha's built Pragateshwar Mahadev Temple at Bhadar and another Devi temple in the Panipat city. Some of the Ror community claims to have descended from the Marathas of this war. In 2018, Ashutosh Gowariker announced a movie for Third Battle of Panipat is the movie Panipat (film) where Arjun Kapoor and Sanjay Dutt will play Bhau and Abdali respectively.

== Schools & Computer centre ==
Schools in Israna:

- Govt. Sr. Sec. School
- Govt. Girls Middle School
- Govt. Girls Senior Secondary School
- Govt. Girls Sr. Sec. School
- Govt. PARAS HKCL Computer Centre Israna (8607997896)

== College ==
- Nemi Chand Medical college and Hospital, Israna, Panipat
- Govt. College, Israna

== Notable people ==
- Shubham Jaglan, professional golfer

== Transportation ==
- Train
- Bus
