= Ranghar =

Community of Muslim Rajputs and agriculturists

Ranghar are a community of Muslim Rajputs in the Indian states of Haryana, Punjab, Himachal Pradesh and Uttar Pradesh and the union territory of Delhi; and in Sindh (Muhajirs) and Punjab in Pakistan.

The Ranghar were classified as an "agricultural tribe" by the British Raj administration. This was often taken to be synonymous with the classification of martial race, and some Ranghars were recruited to the British Indian Army, especially in Skinner's Horse.

== See also ==
- Garha
- Ranghad (term)
- Tomar (Rajput clan)
