= Yoginder Singh Rana =

Indian politician

Member of the Haryana Legislative Assembly
- Incumbent
- Assumed office 8 October 2024
- Preceded by: Shamsher Singh Gogi
- Constituency: Assandh

Personal details
- Party: Bharatiya Janata Party
- Profession: Politician

Yogender Singh Rana is an Indian politician from Haryana. He is a Member of the Haryana Legislative Assembly from 2024, representing Assandh Assembly constituency as a member of the Bharatiya Janata Party.

== Political career ==
Yogender Singh Rana contested the 2024 elections as a BJP candidate from the Asandh constituency and won by a majority of 2,306 votes against his nearest rival Indian National Congress candidate Shamsher Singh Gogi, becoming an MLA for the first time.

== See also ==
- 2024 Haryana Legislative Assembly election
- Haryana Legislative Assembly
