= Yakuza E-Vehicles =

Electric vehicle manufacturing company

- Type: Private
- Industry: Automotive; Electric vehicles; Motorcycle
- Founded: 2019; 7 years ago
- Founder: Nirmala Rani
- Headquarters: Sirsa, Haryana, India
- Area served: India
- Key people: Nishant Kumar (Director); Dr. Dipanshu Mehta (MD)
- Products: Yakuza Rubie Electric Scooter; Yakuza Neu Electric Scooter; Yakuza Y1 Electric Scooter; Yakuza Y2 Electric Scooter; Yakuza Y4 Electric Scooter; Yakuza Y5 Electric Scooter; Yakuza Duster Electric Scooter; Yakuza Ruster Electric Scooter; Yakuza Dragger Electric Scooter; Yakuza Ramie Electric Scooter; Yakuza Asher Electric Scooter; Yakuza Viraj Electric Scooter; Yakuza Zunaid Electric Scooter; Yakuza Cherry Electric Scooter; Yakuza ADAA Electric Scooter; Yakuza Raavta Electric Scooter; Yakuza ASVA Electric Scooter; Yakuza Sparrow Plus Electric Scooter; Yakuza AQABA Electric Scooter; Yakuza Rush Electric Scooter; Yakuza Lucka Electric Scooter
- Services: Motor Vehicle Manufacturing; Motor Vehicle Distribution; EV Batteries
- Owner: Maa Luxmi E-Vehicles Private Limited
- Website: www.yakuzaev.com

Yakuza E-Vehicles is an Indian electric two-wheeler manufacturer headquartered in Sirsa. It was founded by Nirmala Rani in November 2019. It has EV manufacturing facilities in Sirsa, Haryana, Memari, West Bengal, Samudan, Gwalior, Madhya Pradesh and Salem, Tamil Nadu.

== History ==
Yakuza EV was founded in 21st November 2019 by Nirmala Rani. Yakuza Electric Vehicles comes under parent company Maa Luxmi E-Vehicles Private Limited. Yakuza launched its mother plant in Sirsa, Haryana.

Yakuza produced its first low-speed electric scooter (Yakuza Rubie) in 2019. In 2023, Yakuza launched its first budget-friendly EV car.
