= Sirsa =

City in Haryana, India

- City
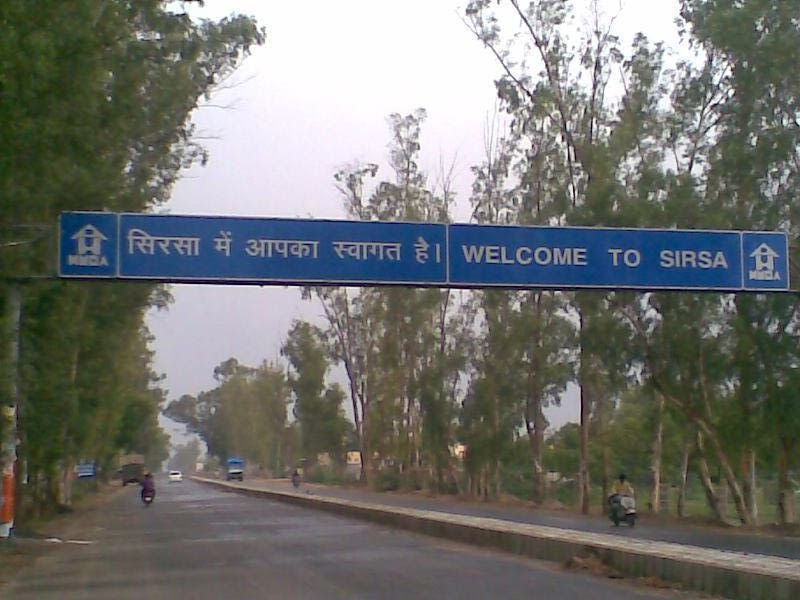
- Sign board of Sirsa city, Haryana, India

- Location within Haryana Location within India
- Coordinates: 29°32′N 75°01′E
- Country: India
- State: Haryana
- Division: Hisar
- District: Sirsa

Government
  - Type: Municipal Council
  - Body: Sirsa Municipal Council
  - Municipal Commissioner: Surender Singh
- Elevation: 200.55 m (658.0 ft)

Population (2011)
  - Total: 200,034
  - Density: 303/km^{2} (780/sq mi)

Languages
  - Official: Hindi
  - Native: Haryanvi; Bagri
- Time zone: UTC+5:30 (IST)
- PIN: 125055
- UNLOCODE: IN HSS
- Telephone code: 91-1666 xxx xxx
- Vehicle registration: HR-24, HR-25, HR-44, HR-57
- Sex ratio: 897 ♂/♀
- Literacy: 72.1
- Planning agency: HUDA
- Website: sirsa.gov.in mcsirsa.gov.in

Sirsa is a city and a municipal council in Sirsa district in the westernmost region of the Indian state of Haryana, bordering Punjab and Rajasthan. It is located near the Thar Desert, 250 kilometres north-west of New Delhi and 260 kilometers south-west of the state capital Chandigarh. Sirsa's nearest cities include Hisar, Fatehabad, Ellenabad, Bhadra, Nohar, Mandi Dabwali and Hanumangarh. Its history dates back to the time of the Mahabharata. At one time, the Sarasvati River flowed in this area.

== Name ==
Sirsa has been identified with two earlier names: Sarsūti in medieval sources and Śairīṣaka in ancient literature. Sarsūti appears to come from the name of the Sarasvati River, which once flowed near Sirsa. Ancient texts mentioning Śairīṣaka include the Mahābhārata, where it is mentioned as one of the places conquered by Nakula; the Aṣṭādhyāyī of Pāṇini; and the Divyāvadāna. The name Śairīṣaka may be derived from the siris tree, Albizia lebbeck, which is common in the area.

A few folk etymologies also exist for the name. The name is derived from that of a mystic named Baba Sarsain Nath; however, there is no historical evidence to support this claim. Another local tradition holds that the town and its fort were founded by a 7th-century king named Saras and subsequently named after him.

== History ==
There are two adjacent archaeological mounds on the southwest side of present-day Sirsa, but archaeologists have not excavated them; therefore, the origins of the settlement at Sirsa remain unknown. However, some isolated discoveries have been made at the Sirsa mounds. The oldest find is a terracotta toy wheel, discovered in 1988, that archaeologists believe dates back to the Iron Age Painted Grey Ware culture (c. 1200-600 BCE). Four terracotta figures, including three depicting women and one depicting a tree (possibly a kalpataru motif), are dated to roughly the time of the Maurya and Shunga dynasties. Numerous copper coins of the Yaudheya and Kushan periods have been found at Sirsa, along with various terracotta objects. These include a statue of the Buddha, a 0.6-m-tall sculpture of the goddess Ganga on her mount, a mukhalinga depicting Shiva, a figure of an elephant with a man and woman riding on top, and various others. Three gold coins from the Gupta Empire (one depicting Samudragupta and an unnamed queen consort, one depicting Chandragupta II, and one of Kumaragupta I) have also been found at Sirsa, along with numerous terracotta objects.

Another discovery from Sirsa is a stone slab inscribed in Sanskrit with a eulogy to a king. The king's name, along with most of the composition, is lost. This inscription is dated to the 5th or 6th century.

Another stone inscription found at the Sirsa mound dates back to the 9th century, during the reign of Mihira Bhoja. Although a large part is missing, the surviving part records the construction of a brick temple to Shiva by a Pāśupata acharya named Nīlakaṇṭha.

According to the Tarikh-i-Firishta, the Ghaznavid sultan Mas'ud I captured Sirsa during his campaign to conquer Hansi in 1037. His troops apparently encountered an abundance of sugar cane growing at Sirsa, which they used to fill the moat around the town's fortress to attack it. However, subsequent Ghaznavid infighting seems to have enabled the Tomara dynasty to recapture Sirsa, since coins of Tomara rulers both before and after 1037 have been found at Sirsa.

The historian Hasan Nizami mentioned Sirsa (as Sarsuti) as the place where Prithviraj Chauhan was captured after the Second Battle of Tarain in 1192. From this point on, Sirsa came under Muslim control. It constituted an iqta, in this context meaning an administrative division, under the Delhi Sultanate. Ibn Battuta visited Sirsa in 1341, during the reign of the Delhi sultan Muhammad bin Tughlaq; he mentioned that it produced a large amount of rice, some of which was exported to Delhi. Also during the 1300s, the Iranian historian Wassaf mentioned Sirsa (as Sarsuti) as one of the major cities of northern India.

Sirsa is listed in the Ain-i-Akbari as a pargana under the sarkar of Hisar, producing a revenue of 4,361,368 dams for the imperial treasury and supplying a force of 5000 infantry and 500 cavalry.

== Geography ==
Sirsa is located at 29.53°N 75.02°E. It has an average elevation of 205 metres (672 feet).

== Demographics ==
As of the 2011 Indian Census, Sirsa had a total population of 200,034, comprising 105,378 males and 94,656 females. The population within the 0 to 6-year age group is 22,804. The total number of literates in Sirsa was 144,225, which constituted 72.1% of the population, with a male literacy rate of 76.0% and a female literacy rate of 67.7%. The effective literacy rate of the 7+ population in Sirsa was 81.4%, with a male literacy rate of 86.2% and a female literacy rate of 76.0%. The Scheduled Castes population was 42,967. Sirsa had 39,689 households in 2011.

=== Religion ===
==== City ====
Religion in Sirsa City
Religion	Population (1911)	Percentage (1911)	Population (1941)	Percentage (1941)
Hinduism	9322	63.73%	13,083	63.15%
Islam	24	31.54%	6,368	30.74%
Sikhism	392	2.68%	831	4.01%
Christianity	123	0.84%	72	0.35%
Others (Note: Including Jainism, Buddhism, Zoroastrianism, Judaism, Ad-Dharmis, or not stated)	177	1.21%	364	1.76%
Total Population	14,629	100%	20,718	100%

==== Tehsil ====
Religion in Sirsa Tehsil (1941)
Religion	Population (1941)	Percentage (1941)
Hinduism	98,161	45.78%
Islam	78,048	36.4%
Sikhism	36,657	17.1%
Christianity	420	0.2%
Others (Note: Including Jainism, Buddhism, Zoroastrianism, Judaism, Ad-Dharmis, or not stated)	1,118	0.52%
Total Population	214,404	100%

== Point of interest ==
=== Air Force station ===
Sirsa hosts Indian Air Force's Sirsa Air Force Station. It is an important air force base, located near the Pakistan border.

=== Dera Sacha Sauda ===
The non-governmental organization Dera Sacha Sauda, established in 1948 by ascetic Mastana Balochistani, has its headquarters in Sirsa.

=== Shri Tara Baba Kutiya (Tarakeswar Dham) ===
Shri Tara Baba Kutiya, also known as Tarakeswar Dham, was constructed in the year 2003 with help from Sirsa MLA Gopal Goyal Kanda. It is near Ramnagarian village on Haryana State Highway 23 (Sirsa-Ellenabad Road). It features a statue of Shiva and an idol of Nandi.

=== Abubshahar Wildlife Sanctuary ===
Abubshahar Wildlife Sanctuary is located in the Sirsa district, which is the largest wildlife sanctuary of Haryana. Abubshaher Wildlife Sanctuary is also the birthplace of the black pheasant.

=== Yakuza E-Vehicles ===
Yakuza Electric Vehicles is one of the largest electric vehicle manufacturing facilities in Sirsa, Haryana.
