= Pundir Rajputs =

Clan of Rajputs in India

Regions with significant populations
- India

Languages
- Hindi, Rajasthani, Garhwali, Kumaoni

Religion
- Hinduism, Islam

Related ethnic groups
- Rajputs

The Pundir are a clan of Rajputs based in Uttarakhand and western Uttar Pradesh.

== History ==
Eric Stokes noted that:

In the Katha the Pundir Rajputs stood out as the dominant landholders, dwelling together as a formidable clan that had never been properly brought under close administration. A proud, hardy race ... they possessed a long history of turbulence. Significantly they had successfully warded off alien intrusion ... So formidable did they appear as adversaries before the recapture of Delhi at the end of September 1857 that the British left them severely alone, despite their attacks on Deoband town and in similar depredations.

== See also ==
- Rajput clans
- Prithviraj Chauhan
- First Battle of Tarain

== Sources ==
- Evatt, John T. Historical Record of the Royal Garhwal Rifles (p. 78; p. 103)
- Roy, K. The Construction of Regiments in the Indian Army: 1859-1913. War in History, 1 April 2001, vol. 8, no. 2 (pp. 127–148)
- Bajpai, Shiv Chandra. The Northern Frontier of India: Central and Western Sector (p. 23)
- Siddiqi, Jamal Muhammad. A Historical Survey: Ancient Times to 1803 AD (p. 124; p. 180)
