= Dighal =

Village in Jhajjar (Haryana), India

- village
- Location in Haryana, India Dighal (India)
- Coordinates: 28°45′N 76°37′E
- Country: India
- State: Haryana
- District: Jhajjar
- Founder: Digha Ahlawat

Area
  - Total: 30.57 km^{2} (11.80 sq mi)
- Elevation: 222 m (728 ft)

Languages
  - Official: Haryanvi
- Time zone: UTC+5:30 (IST)
- PIN: 124107
- Telephone code: 01251
- ISO 3166 code: IN-HR
- Vehicle registration: HR 77
- Nearest city: Rohtak
- Lok Sabha constituency: Rohtak
- Vidhan Sabha constituency: Beri
- Website: haryana.gov.in

Dighal is a village in Beri tehsil in Jhajjar district of Haryana state in north India. It falls under the Rohtak Division. It is the largest village in terms of population in a single panchayat in Haryana.

== History ==
The village was established in 1194 by a legend named 'Digha'.

== Contribution to Indian Armed forces ==
The village is renowned for its contribution in the armed forces. A number of locals from the village join the Indian Army. The “Veer Sainik Yaadgaar” is a memorial built in memory of freedom fighters from the village and was founded by the “Purv Sainik Samiti” in 2013. Some of the prominent martyrs are Captain Narender Pal Singh Ahlawat s/o Ch. Uday Singh Ahlawat, Captain Badan Singh Ahlawat, Captain Narender Singh Ahlawat (Shaurya Chakra).

== Population ==
The Dighal village has a population of 14,146, of which 7,663 are males while 6,483 are females as per Population Census 2011.

== Politics and class ==
Historically, the dominant political parties have been the national party Indian National Congress and the state-level party Indian National Lok Dal. The winning candidate in the local assembly elections has been from the Indian National Congress for the Beri constituency, which Dighal is a part of, since the year 2000.

The village, along with other nearby villages, is also infamous for the influence and political clout of the khap panchayats.

== Religion ==
There are various temples in the village. Peer Baba Mohjama Temple is most famous in nearby villages and sees a footfall of thousands of people from all over, throughout the year.

== Connectivity ==
Dighal has road connectivity by NH-352. It also has a railway station. Abbreviated with station code DGHL, it has two platforms and falls under the Northern Zone of the Indian Railways. Only a few trains halt at the station. The village can also be reached by nearby railway stations in Kharawar and Asthal Bohar.

== Bird watching ==
Dighal is surrounded by lakes and wetlands and is on the route of many migratory bird species which make Dighal an ideal location for bird watching. Hundreds of species of birds migrating from Africa and northern Asia stop over at Dighal making it a popular destination for bird-watching enthusiasts. Over the years, sightings of the marbled duck, long-billed dowitcher, and baikal teal have been reported. In 2018, the rare Slavonian horned grebe was said to have been sighted in Dighal for the first time in 16 years.

== Adjacent villages ==
- Gangtan 0.5 kilometres (0.31 mi) away
- Dhandhlan
- Karontha
- Brahana
- Lakaria
- Dimana
- Gochi
- Kharawar
- Bhambhewa
