= Panipat district =

- District of Haryana
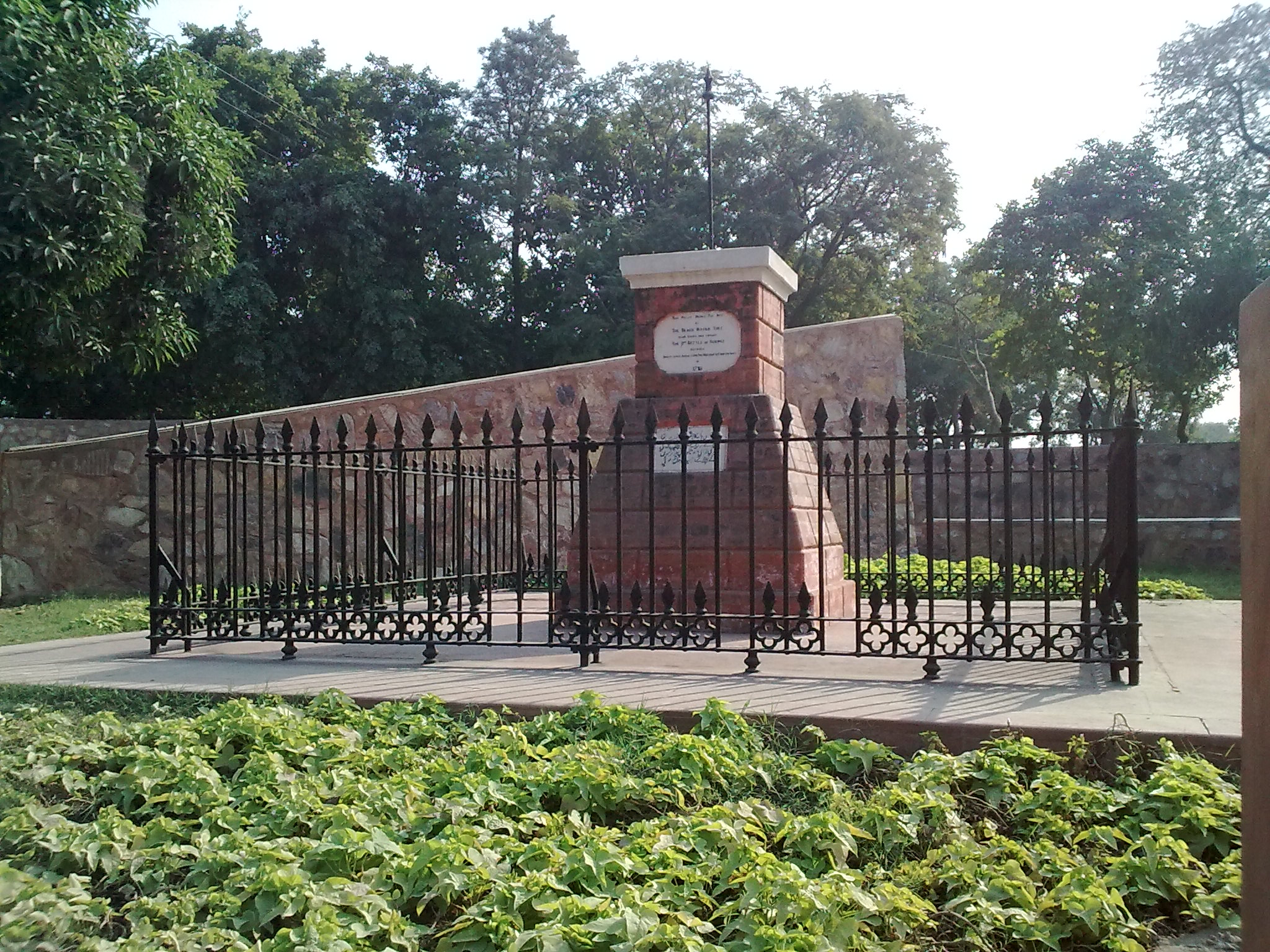
- Kala Amb, site of the Third Battle of Panipat

- Location in Haryana
- Coordinates (Panipat): 29.39°N 76.97°E
- Country: India
- State: Haryana
- Division: Karnal
- Headquarters: Panipat
- Tehsils: 1. Panipat, 2. Samalkha, 3. Israna, 4. Madlauda, 5. Bapoli

Area
  - Total: 1,268 km^{2} (490 sq mi)

Population (2011)
  - Total: 1,205,437
  - Density: 950.7/km^{2} (2,462/sq mi)
  - Urban: 555,085

Demographics
  - Literacy: 75.94%: Male = 83.71%; Female = 67.00%
  - Sex ratio: 864
- Time zone: UTC+05:30 (IST)
- Major highways: NH1, NH71A, NH709AD, SH16
- Lok Sabha constituencies: Karnal (shared with Karnal district)
- Vidhan Sabha constituencies: 1. Panipat Rural, 2. Panipat City, 3. Israna, 4. Samalkha
- Website: panipat.gov.in

Panipat district is one of the 23 districts of Haryana in north India. The historical city of Panipat is the administrative headquarters of the district. The district occupies an area of 1,268 km^{2} (490 mi^{2}), making it the nineteenth largest in the state with Gurgaon and Panchkula following it.

== History ==
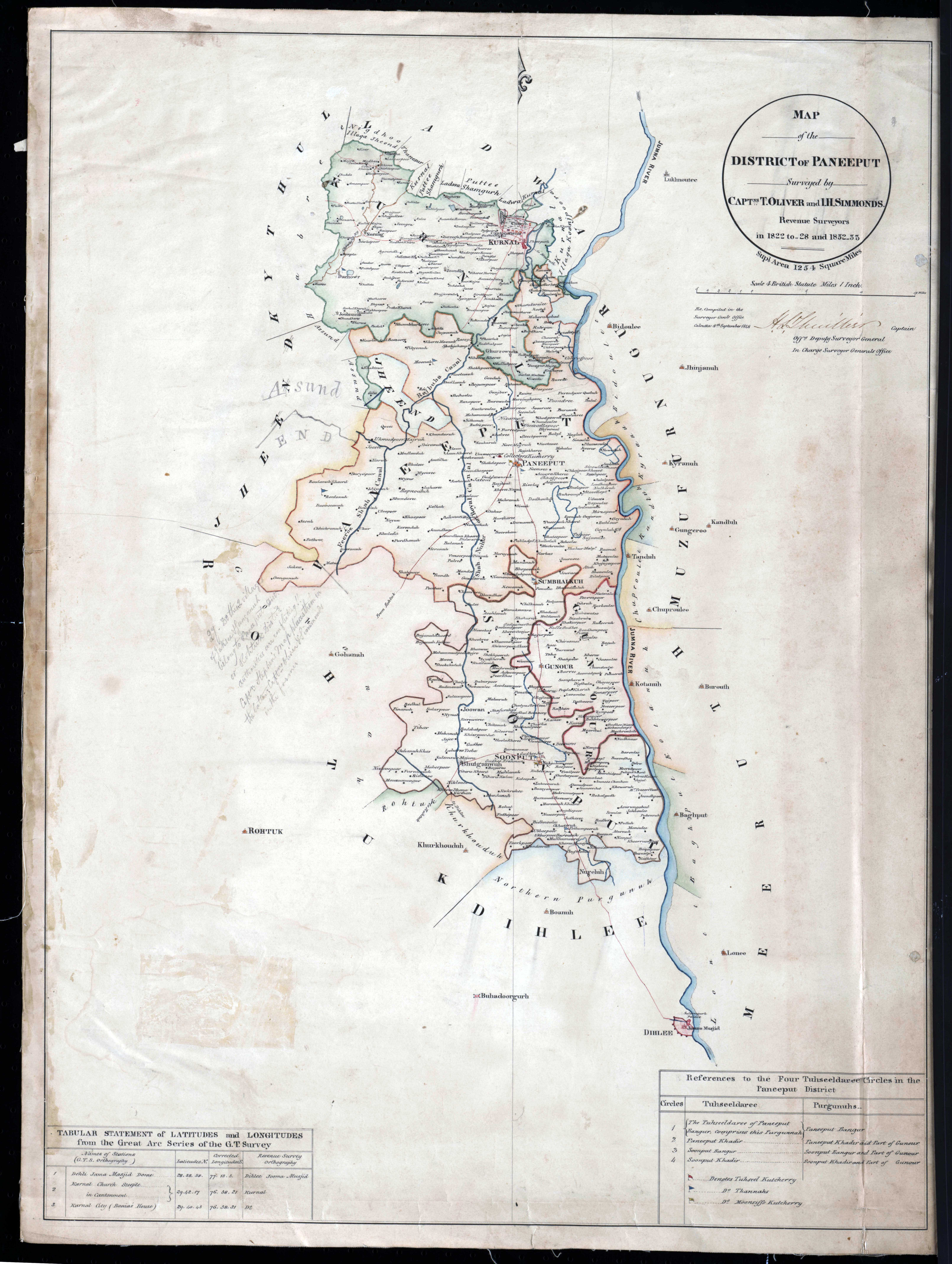
Map of Panipat District, surveyed by T. Oliver and I. H. Simmonds, 1822–28 and 1832–38, recompiled in 1848.

The first record of the district is found in Ain-i-Akbari. It was part of Subah Delhi. When the British took over the area in 1803, it was a part of Delhi territory. In 1819 reorganisation, Panipat, Karnal and Sonipat areas formed part of Panipat district. In 1851 Panipat district was divided into Panipat and Karnal tahsils with headquarters at Panipat and Gharaunda respectively. Three years later, headquarters of the district were shifted to Karnal. Since then numerous intra-district changes occurred.

Panipat district was carved out from the erstwhile Karnal district on 1 November 1989. On 24 July 1991 it was again merged with Karnal district. On 1 January 1992 it again became a separate district. Panipat is famous for textile industry

== Administration ==
The district lies in Karnal division having two sub-divisional offices located at Panipat and Samalkha. The district has three tahsils viz Panipat, Israna and Samalkha. Five Community Development Blocks Madlauda, Panipat, Israna, Samalkha and Bapauli have been set up in the district for the development of rural areas.

Panipat district appeared on the Census map for the first time in 1991 comprising Panipat and Assandh tahsils. It was carved out of Karnal district. At that time, Panipat tahsil had 186 villages and two notified towns of Panipat and Samalkha and Assandh tahsil contained 46 villages and one town, namely, Assandh. Israna and Samalkha tahsils were created in December 1991 out of Panipat tahsil. Assandh tahsil was transferred back to Karnal in July 1991. Present position of the district in 2011 Census is that it contains 3 tahsils, namely, Panipat (76 villages and Panipat MCL, Kachrauli C.T., Kabri C.T., Sikanderpur C.T., Asan Khurd C.T., Panipat Taraf Ansar C.T., Panipat Taraf, Makhdum Zadgan C.T., Ugra Kheri C.T., Panipat Taraf Rajputan C.T., Sec. 11&12 Part II C.T., and Kheri Nangal C.T.), Israna (28 villages and no urban area) and Samalkha (82 villages and Samalkha MC).

Administratively, the Deputy Commissioner of Panipat is the overall incharge of the general administration in the district and performs the duties of the District Magistrate and the District Collector. Below the Deputy Commissioner is the Additional Deputy Commissioner who assists the Deputy Commissioner in the work relating to general administration, rural development, etc. The Deputy Commissioner along with ADC, chief executive officer of Zila Parishad, Superintendent of Police and other senior officers of the district looks after the development and regulatory functions in the district.

== Sub-Divisions ==
The Panipat district is headed by an IAS officer of the rank of Deputy Commissioner (DC) who is the chief executive officer of the district. The district is divided into 2 sub-divisions, each headed by a Sub-Divisional Magistrate (SDM): Panipat and Samalkha.

=== Revenue tehsils ===
The above 2 sub-divisions are divided into 5 revenue tehsils, namely, Panipat, Samalkha, Israna, Bapoli and Madlauda.

== Assembly constituencies ==
There are four Vidhan Sabha constituencies in this district:

- Panipat Rural
- Panipat City
- Israna
- Samalkha

Panipat district is a part of the Karnal (Lok Sabha constituency).

== Demographics ==
Historical population
Year	Pop.	±% p.a.
1951	238,834	—
1961	298,232	+2.25%
1971	382,445	+2.52%
1981	507,164	+2.86%
1991	698,103	+3.25%
2001	967,449	+3.32%
2011	1,205,437	+2.22%

According to the 2011 census Panipat district has a population of 1,205,437, roughly equal to the nation of Bahrain or the US state of New Hampshire. This gives it a ranking of 396th in India (out of a total of 640). The district has a population density of 951 inhabitants per square kilometre (2,460/sq mi) . Its population growth rate over the decade 2001-2011 was 24.60%. Panipat has a sex ratio of 864 females for every 1000 males, and a literacy rate of 75.94%. Scheduled Castes make up 17.11% of the population.

Religion in Panipat district (2011)
Religion	Percent
Hinduism	89.92%
Islam	7.19%
Sikhism	2.08%
Other or not stated	0.81%

=== Languages ===
Languages of Panipat district (2011)
1. Haryanvi (47.9%)
2. Hindi (42.5%)
3. Punjabi (6.09%)
4. Bhojpuri (0.98%)
5. Others (2.52%)

At the time of the 2011 Census of India, 47.89% of the population in the district spoke Haryanvi, 42.52% Hindi, 6.09% Punjabi and 0.98% Bhojpuri as their first language. Hindi, Haryanvi and Punjabi are primarily spoken in urban areas, while Haryanvi dominates rural areas.

== Education ==
There are several engineering colleges in Panipat district:

- APIIT SD India
- Panipat Institute Of Engineering & Technology
- Geeta group of institutions
- NC College Of Engineering

== Notable people ==
- Neeraj Chopra - Indian track and field athlete, 2020 Olympic Gold medalist
- Deshbandhu Gupta (1901–1951) - independence campaigner
- Altaf Hussain Hali - Urdu poet
- Satyen Kappu - Bollywood actor
- Asees Kaur - playback singer
- Rohit Kumar - kabaddi player
- Bu Ali Shah Qalandar (1209–1324 CE) - Qalandar and Sufi saint
- Jasvir Singh - kabaddi player

== Villages ==
- Puthar
- Madlauda
- Bhodwal Majri
- Patti Kalyana
- Chulkana
- Atawala
- Kurad
