= Peont =

- village
- Location in Haryana, India Peont (India)
- Coordinates: 29°37′50″N 76°47′54″E
- Country: India
- State: Haryana
- District: Karnal
- Elevation: 253 m (830 ft)

Population (2001)
  - Total: 6,500

Languages
  - Official: Hindi
- Time zone: UTC+5:30 (IST)
- PIN: 132036
- Telephone code: +91-0184-XXXXXX
- Vehicle registration: HR
- Sex Ratio: 904:1000 ♂/♀
- Website: haryana.gov.in

Peont is a village and a Panchayat at Nissing tehsil in Karnal district in the Indian state of Haryana. It comes under Chirao block. The village is located about 22 km from Karnal on Assandh road National Highway 709A. It is well connected to Jundla via Assandh road 9 km & Gondar road 11 km Pacca khera road 6 km

== Geography ==
Peont is located at 29.653°N 76.86°E. It has an average elevation of 253 metres (777 feet).

== Physiography ==
The village lies in Nardak, Khadir and Bangar area. It has four ponds and two large draining rivers, one flowing from the north east and another flowing from the north west and forming one river which flows to the south.

== Demographics ==
People of this village speak in Haryanvi. Hindi and Punjabi language is the local language.

== Administration ==
Village administration comes under Nilokheri sub-division of Karnal district. It is one among the 44 panchayat of Nissing at Chirao block of Karnal. Polling strength is 2363.

== Social structure ==
Peont is a village in agricultural belt having mostly Ror & Sikh families along with other agricultural communities.

== Utility services ==
The water supply in Peont is managed by its Jal Board and is very well managed. Peont's Electric Supply Undertaking is managed by the Uttar Haryana Bijli Vitran Nigam. Bharat Sanchar Nigam Limited provides tele-services for landline, mobile, and many other services. Many private telecom operators are also offering their services in the city as Vodafone Essar, Airtel, Idea, Reliance, Tata, MTS, Aircel.

=== Commercial banks ===
There are various banks facilitating people of the town as well as other from nearby areas. Automated teller machines of these banks are also situated all over the town for the facility of banking activities.

=== Post Office ===
The pin code of Peont is 132036 and postal head office is at Jundla.

== Transport ==
=== Railways ===
There is no railway station within 10 km. Bazida Jatan Railway Station and Gharaunda Railway Station are major railway stations 18 & 21 km away, respectively. However, the most accessible main station for passengers is Karnal which is 21 km away.

=== Roadways ===
There is a national highway 709A road connecting Karnal to Peont to Assandh National highway 709A Assandh road serving the purpose of connectivity of nearby towns and villages. It is located 22 km to the west of district headquarters Karnal, 9 km from Nissang, and 143 km from state capital Chandigarh.

== Temples ==
There is a big Gururavi dass Temple, Shiv Temple and Sikh Temple (Gurudwara).

== Employment and education ==
The village has approximately 8,500 inhabitants The main occupations are agriculture, farming and cattle breeding.

=== Colleges ===
- Diet Shahpur

=== Schools ===
- Govt Middle School (right side)
- Govt Middle School (left side)
- Geeta Sr. Sec. School

== Nearby places ==
=== Nearby villages ===
- Agond 5 km
- Jundla
- Bansa 5 km
- Chirao
- Gonder 6 km
- Jani
- Katleri 3 km
- Kheri Naroo
- Padha
- Picholia
- Sheikhpura Manchuri

=== Nearby cities ===
- Gharaunda 20 km
- Karnal 22 km
- Assandh 25 km
- Taraori 26 km
- Nilokheri 30 km

== See also ==
- Nissing
- Karnal
