= Chakda =

Chakda ਚਕਦਾ चकदा
- Village
- Location in Haryana, India Chakda (India)
- Coordinates: 29.77°N 76.71°E
- Country: India
- State: Haryana
- District: Karnal
- Tehsil: Nissing

Government
  - Type: Panchayat
  - Body: Gram Panchayat

Population (2011)
  - Total: 741

Languages
  - Official: Punjabi Hindi
- Postal code: 132024
- Telephone code: 01745
- Vehicle registration: HR 05
- Website: m.facebook.com/chakdakarnal

Chakda is a village and a Panchayat at Nissing tehsil in Karnal district in the Indian state of Haryana. Chakda is located about 10 km from Nissing and about 27 km from Karnal district via both state highway 8 and 9.

== History ==
This village was once known by King Chakwa Ben. This village belonged to the Muslim population before the partition.

== Temples ==
- Gurudwara sahib

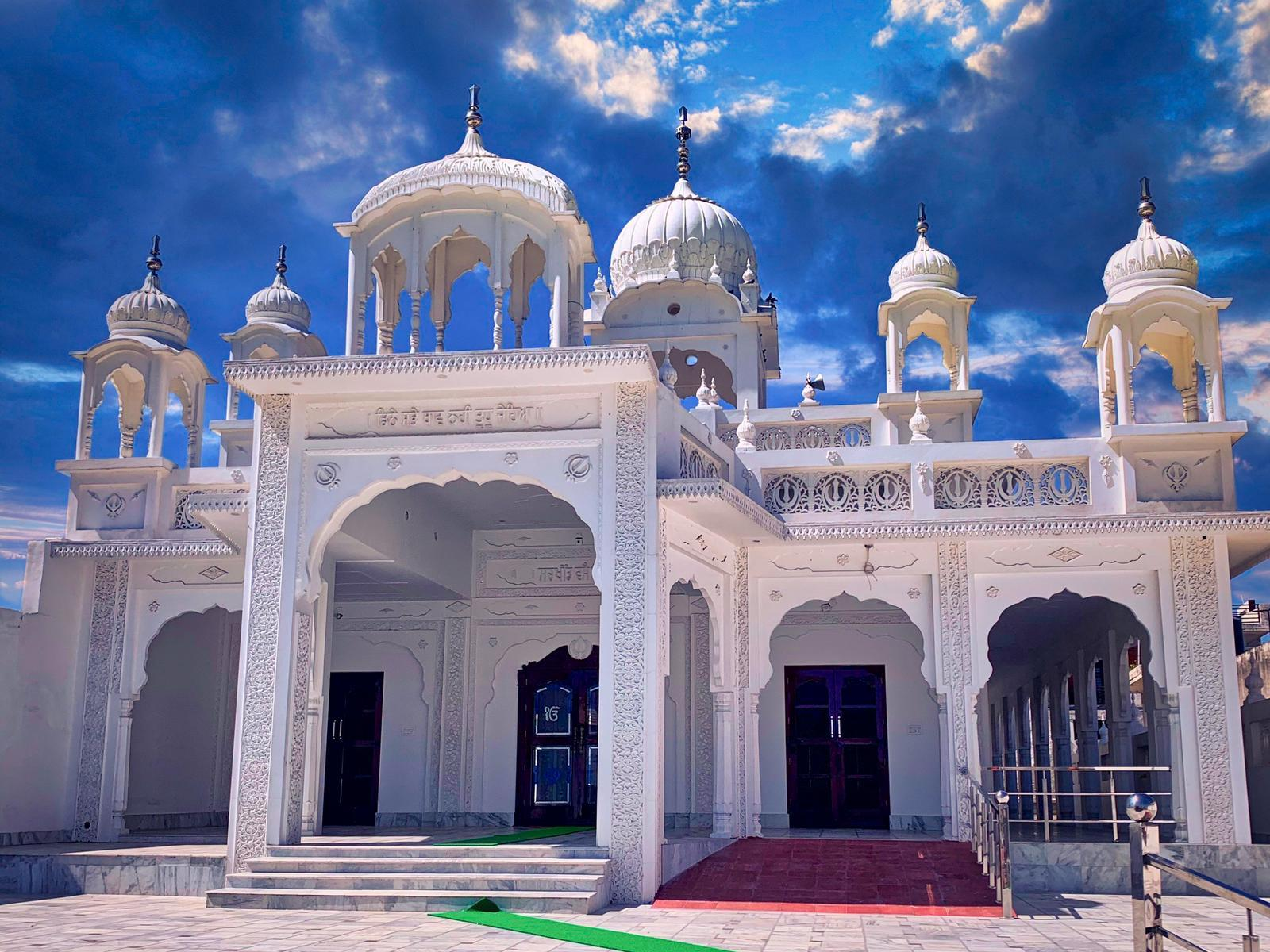

- Pir Baba Ji place
- Nagar khera
- Basanti mata mandir

== Education ==
- Government primary school
- Saraswati public school

== Geography ==
Chakda is located at 29.77°N 76.71°E .This village is located about 10 km from Nissing, 27 km from karnal, 31 km from kaithal, 32 km from kurushetra, 25 km from pehowa and 26 km from Assandh

== Physiography ==
The village lies in Nardak, Khadir and Bangar area. It has two ponds and one big river flowing from north to south.

== Demographics ==
The populace speak the Punjabi language and are mostly Sikhs. They are predominantly agriculturists.

== Administration ==
The village administration comes under Nissing sub-division of Karnal district. It is one among the 44 Pancahayat of Nissing at Chirao block of Karnal.
