= Balraj Panwar =

Indian rower

- Balraj Panwar

Personal information
- Born: 26 July 1999 (age 27) Kaimla, Karnal district, Haryana, India
- Occupation: Rower
- Military career
- Allegiance: India
- Branch: Indian Army
- Service years: 2018–present
- Rank: Naib Subedar

Sport
- Sport: Rowing
- Coached by: Ismail Baig; Bajrang Lal Takhar
Medal record
Representing India
Men's single sculls rowing
Event	1st	2nd	3rd
Olympic Games	0	0	0
World Asian and Oceanian Olympic	0	0	1
Asian Games	0	0	0
National Games	1	0	0
National Rowing Championships	2	0	0
Open Sprints National Rowing Championship	0	0	1
Total	3	0	2
Olympic Games
	2024 Paris	M1X
2024 World Asian and Oceanian Olympics regatta
Bronze medal – third place	2024 Korea	M1X
Asian Games
	2022 China	M1X
	2026 Japan	M1X
Asian Rowing Championships
Gold medal – first place	2025 Haiphong	M1X
World Cup
	2023 Switzerland	M1X
	2024 Poland	M1X
National Games
	2022 Gujarat	M1X
Gold medal – first place	2023 Goa	M1X
National Rowing Championship
Gold medal – first place	2023 Pune	M4X
Gold medal – first place	2024 Pune	M1X
Open Sprint National Rowing Championship
Bronze medal – third place	2024 Pune	M1X

Balraj Panwar (born 26 July 1999) is an Indian rower from Kaimla, Haryana. He competes in the men's single sculls. He qualified to represent India at the 2024 Summer Olympics in Paris in the men's single sculls and finished 23rd.

== Early life and education ==
Panwar was born on 26 July 1999 in Kaimla village, Gharaunda subdivision, Karnal, Haryana. His father Randhir Panwar died when he was 10 and his mother Kamala Panwar brought him up and four other siblings by doing odd jobs like picking vegetables, selling milk, working at construction sites or shred wheat. She also worked at a garment factory. He is married and has one child. He joined Indian Army as a sepoy to support his family financially. He was first posted at the Bengal Engineering Group. He is preparing for the Olympics at the Army Training Node at Pune from October 2021. He is training under National coach Ismail Baig and 2008 Olympian Bajrang Lal Takhar.

== Career ==
Panwar won a bronze medal at the Asia-Oceania Olympic Qualification rowing competition in Chungju, South Korea on 21 April 2024 to book India's first Olympic quota in rowing for the 2024 Paris Olympics. He was leading until the first 1600 metres in the 2 km race, but lost time in the last 500 metres. But his early lead helped him qualify for the Olympics.

Earlier, he missed the bronze medal at the 2022 Asian Games after qualifying for the final. As a second reserve, he was a last-minute participant at the Asian Games. He also took part in the World Championship at Switzerland before Asian Games in July 2023. In the army, he was picked up for rowing because of his 6-foot height and winning the battalion regatta in his first attempt. Earlier, he took part in the 2022 National Games and 2023 National Championship.

Panwar won the gold medal at the 2025 Asian Rowing Championships in Hai Phong, Vietnam, in the men's single scull (M1X) event.
