= Harvinder =

Harvinder is a given name. Notable people with the name include:

- Harvinder Kalyan, Indian politician
- Harvinder Mankkar, Indian writer, illustrator, and film director
- Harvinder Sahota, Indian-American cardiologist
- Harvinder Singh, Indian cricketer
- Harvinder Singh Marwa, Kenyan field hockey player
- Harvinder Sodhi, Indian cricketer
- Harvinder Sall, Accountant & Angel Investor

== See also ==
- Harwinder (disambiguation)
