= Sirsal =

Coordinates: 29°41′N 76°40′E

Sirsal is a village in the Indian state of Haryana, in the Kaithal region. It currently has a total population of 7,696. Most of the villagers are either of the Shandilya Brahmin & Turan Ror Gotra clan. The two Gotras own almost all of the agricultural land around the village. The majority of the village's population is employed in the agricultural sector, although there are a few private businesses and government offices.

== Census Information ==
Census Parameter	Census Data
Total Population	7696
Total # of Houses	1492
Female Population %	46.3% (3561)
Total Literacy Rate	59.8% (4604)
Female Literacy rate	50.9% (1811)
Scheduled Tribes Population %	0.0% (0)
Scheduled Caste Population %	16.9% (1301)
Working Population %	36.7% (2824)
Child(0-6) Population by 2011	14.1% (1083)
Girl Child(0 -6) Population % by 2011	44.6% (483)

== Education ==
There is a government boys' school up to 10th standard and a government girls' school up to 12th standard in the humanities branch, as well as multiple private schools. Village literacy is approximately 59.8% (4,604 people).

== Nearby ==
There is a transport system which links Sirsal to the nearby towns of Nissing, Rasina, and Pundri, and larger cities such as Karnal or Kaithal

== Facilities available in village ==
In the village, there is an animal hospital, primary health center, post office, senior secondary boys & girls high schools, several Hindu temples, privately run clinics and also pharmacies.

== Employment ==
80% of the village residents are dependent on agricultural work, while some others work in the government and the military. Many also manage retail shops in nearby towns such as Nissing or Pundri.
