= Rasina =

Rasina is a Slavic toponym that may refer to:

- Rasina District, a district in Serbia
- Rasina (river), a river in Rasina District
- Rasina, Estonia, a village in Põlva Parish, Põlva County, Estonia
- Rasina, Kaithal, a village in Kaithal District, Haryana, India
