= Rasina, Kaithal =

Rasina
- village
- Location in Haryana, India Rasina (India)
- Coordinates: 29°45′26.9964″N 76°40′27.3396″E
- Country: India
- State: Haryana
- District: Kaithal district

Government
  - Type: Local government
  - Body: Panchayat

Area
  - Total: 7.28 km^{2} (2.81 sq mi)
- Elevation: 237 m (778 ft)

Population (2011)
  - Total: 3,843
  - Density: 528/km^{2} (1,370/sq mi)

Languages
  - Official: Hindi
- Time zone: UTC+5:30 (IST)
- PIN: 136042
- Telephone code: 01746
- Vehicle registration: HR-08
- Literacy: 74.50% (total); 85.85% (male); 62.09% (female)
- Sex ratio: 881 ♂/♀

Rasina is an old village of in Pundri Tehsil in Kaithal district of Haryana State, India before 9th century AD . Its administration done by Pratihars and its situated in the cluster of Pratihars 84 villages. It lies in Kurukshetra of 48 kos area. It is located 29 kilometres (18 mi) towards east from district headquarters Kaithal, 34 km from Karnal, 12 kilometres (7.5 mi) from Pundri and 127 kilometres (79 mi) from state capital Chandigarh 155 km from Delhi. According to a 1918 survey, Rors held 84 villages in Pheoa and 12 villages beyond the Ganges. They had the strongest presence in Indri Nardak and Mori Nardak. They had substantial presence on the east of Pargana Kaithal and south of Kaithal tahsil near the Jind border. Rasina village presence is in Nardak area of Haryana.

== Health Centre ==
There is one government primary health center and a government veterinary hospital. Along with those Dr. Amarjit Teonthewala clinic, Dr. Rampal Clininc, Dr. Ramkumar and Dr. Pal is also in service to save lives.

== Schools ==
There is one government primary school for boys and a government primary school for girls. And also a government high school at Rasina By-Pass Road. Apart from three Government schools, there are three private schools as well providing quality education to the students from neighbour villages. Private: AVP Sr. Sec. School, SD Sr Sec. School and Guru Brahmanand Sr. sec. School. Govt. primary school for boys, Govt. primary school for girls, Govt. high school.

In the 80’s and 90’s, the Government Senior Secondary School was the main secondary school in the area, providing an education that led to success in professions such as civil administration, military, medicine, and engineering for its graduates.

== Transportation ==
Rasina is locate on State Highway 8 right in the center of Kaithal and Karnal. This Village has bypass road for the heavy vehicles - truck, trailer, and all other than public vehicles. There are three Link Road via Sanch village From Rasina to Assandh and Aanhu, Kaul, Dhand Pihowa, third one links to small villages Gohida, Chakda and further. Nearby villages like Teontha, Gohida, Ahun and Ahmedpur, Sanch, Bastli are all linked with Road to Rasina village.

This village has 15 min bus service, sometime 5 min, you can directly ride the buses to various destinations - Karnal, Kaithal, Kurukshetra, Delhi, Gurgaon, Faridabad, Tohana, Sonipat, Jhunjhunu - Rajasthan, Jind, Pehowa, Patiala, Assandh and many others.

== Temple ==
There are many temples of god and goddess, tourist places like Rinmonchan tirth Rasina. Baba Kashipuri temple, Guru Ravidas Temple and Guru Brhmanand Temple are famous. There 2 statues found of 9th century AD and made of chloride schist and has blackish green colour, that was used in also Gandhara sculptures.Bricks Found of the size — 31 x 21x 5 cm in Rinmochan Tirth temple.

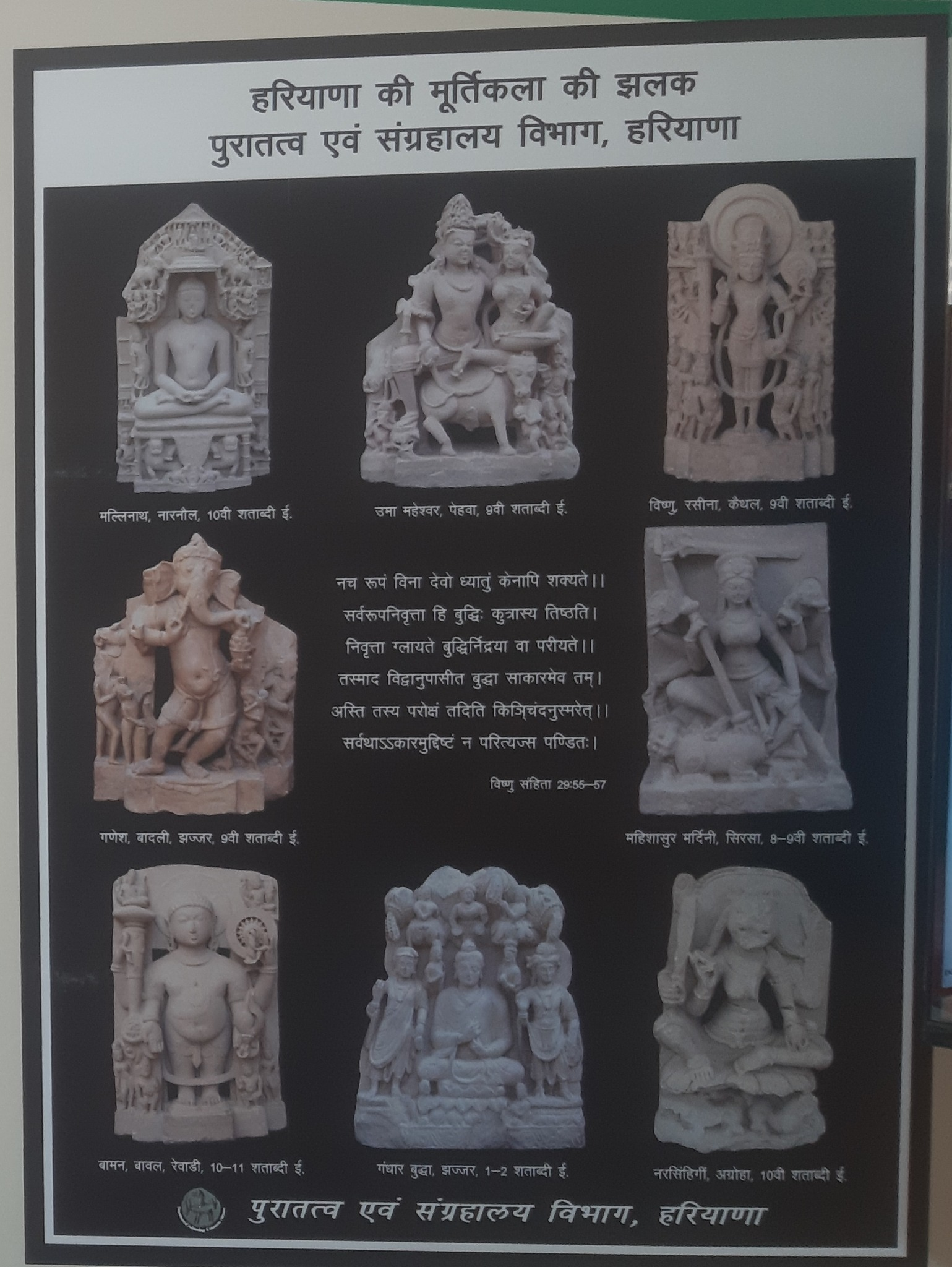
Idols found in Rinmonchan tirth Rasina

== See also ==
- Doab
- Khadir and Bangar
- Nardak
- Ror
