= Agond =

Agondh
- Village
- Location in Haryana, India Agondh (India)
- Coordinates: 29.670°N 76.801°E
- Country: India
- State: Haryana
- District: Karnal
- Division: Rohtak

Government
  - Member of Parliament: Manohar Lal Khattar
  - Member of Legislative Assembly: Yogender Singh Rana
  - Sarpanch: Smt Maina Devi Sharma

Population (2011)
  - Total: 7,450

Languages
  - Official: Hindi
  - Additional official: English, Punjabi
- Time zone: UTC+5:30 (IST)
- PIN: 132024
- Vehicle registration: HR
- Nearest city: Panipat, Kurukshetra, Jind, Kaithal
- Lok Sabha constituency: Karnal
- Vidhan Sabha constituency: Assandh
- Nearest capitals: New Delhi, Chandigarh
- Website: haryana.gov.in

== History ==
This village was settled by separating it from the ancient village of Seori.

== Demographics ==
As of 2011 Indian Census, Agond had a total population of 7,450, of which 3,922 were males and 3,528 were females. Population within the age group of 0 to 6 years was 997. The total number of literates in Agond was 4,642, which constituted 62.3% of the population with male literacy of 67.8% and female literacy of 56.2%. The effective literacy rate of 7+ population of Agond was 71.9%, of which male literacy rate was 78.4% and female literacy rate was 64.8%. The Scheduled Castes population was 1,741. Agond had 1338 households in 2011.

== Nearby settlements ==
There is a transport system which links Agondh to the nearby towns of Nissing, Assandh, and Chirao, and larger cities such as Karnal or Kaithal

== Facilities ==
There is a veterinary hospital in the village. A bank branch is also available with this. Farm medicine shops are also available in the village. Anganwadi centers are also built. Two Haryana Roadways buses are also available in the village.
