= Katlaheri =

Katlaheri (कतलाहेड़ी)
- village
- Location in Haryana, India Katlaheri (India)
- Coordinates: 29°38′32.7″N 76°49′20.7″E
- Country: India
- State: Haryana
- District: Karnal
- Established: 1828
- Founded by: Ror Caste

Population
  - Total: About= 4,500

Languages
  - Official: Hindi, Haryanvi
- Time zone: UTC+5:30 (IST)
- PIN: 132036
- ISO 3166 code: IN-HR
- Vehicle registration: HR 05
- Nearest city: Karnal
- Lok Sabha constituency: karnal
- Website: haryana.gov.in

Katlaheri is a village situated in the Karnal district of Haryana. It is at a distance of 19 kilometres (12 mi) from Karnal and 5 kilometres (3.1 mi) from Jundla on the road to Assandh.

This village is famous by the name thakur Kundan singh and Dr. Panna Lal Sharma
