= Teontha, Kaithal =

Teontha
- Village
- Location in Haryana, India Teontha (India)
- Coordinates: 29°46′25.6″N 76°37′04.3″E
- Country: India
- State: Haryana
- District: Kaithal district

Government
  - Type: Local government
  - Body: Panchayat

Area
  - Total: 12.16 km^{2} (4.70 sq mi)

Population (2011)
  - Total: 5,964
  - Density: 490.5/km^{2} (1,270/sq mi)

Languages
  - Official: Hindi
- Time zone: UTC+5:30 (IST)
- PIN: 136042
- Telephone code: 01749
- Vehicle registration: HR-08
- Literacy: 74.37% (total); 81.84% (male); 66.05% (female)
- Sex ratio: 875 ♂/♀

Teontha is a village in Pundri Tehsil in Kaithal district of Haryana State, India. It is located 21 kilometres towards east from district headquarters Kaithal, 40 km from Karnal, 5 kilometres from Pundri and 125 kilometres from state capital Chandigarh 165 km from Delhi.

== History ==
The royal sage manu performed penance here to attain salvation. This pond is known as Manokamna Teerth after the name of the sage. Local residents proudly claim that the shrine's pond has crystal glass stairs leading to the water.

== Temples ==
Guru Bharmanand Mandir Teontha, Dada Khera Temple, Shiv Temple.

== Societies ==
Ror community of Khasber, Dhandhan, Kharangar gotra lives in Teontha village.

== Transportation ==
Teontha is located on State Highway SH 8 right in the center of Kaithal and Karnal. This Village has bypass road for the heavy vehicles - truck, trailer, and all other than public vehicles. Nearby villages like Sangroli, Chuharmajra, Dusain, Dulyani, Kaul, Sanch, Munnarehri, Habri, Barsana, Jamba are all linked with a road to Teontha village.

The village has 15 min bus service, sometime 5 min, you can directly ride the buses to various destinations - Karnal, Kaithal, Kurukshetra, Delhi, Gurgaon, Faridabad, Tohana, Sonipat, Charkhi dadri, Narnaul, Jhunjhunu - Rajasthan, Jind, Pehowa, Patiala, Assandh and many others.

== Schools ==
Schools include GPS School Teontha, GSSS School Teontha, J.P Sr.Sec. School Teontha and Shree Geeta Niketan Sr. Sec School Teontha.
