= Uncha Siwana =

- Town
- Location in Haryana, India Uncha Siwana (India)
- Coordinates: 29.6208°N 76.9994°E
- Country: India
- State: Haryana
- District: Karnal

Population (2001)
  - Total: 10,609

Languages
  - Official: Hindi
- Time zone: UTC+5:30 (IST)
- ISO 3166 code: IN-HR
- Vehicle registration: HR
- Website: haryana.gov.in

Uncha Siwana is a census town in Karnal district in the Indian state of Haryana.

== Demographics ==
As of 2001 India census, Uncha Siwana had a population of 10,609. Males constitute 65% of the population and females 35%. Uncha Siwana has an average literacy rate of 75%, higher than the national average of 59.5%: male literacy is 85%, and female literacy is 58%. In Uncha Siwana, 10% of the population is under 6 years of age.
