= Pingli =

Pingli may refer to:

- Pingli County, a county of Ankang, Shaanxi, China
- Pingli, Nissing, a village in Nissing, Haryana, India
- Pingali, Parbhani, a village in Maharashtra state of India
