= Nardak =

Region of Haryana, India

The Nardak ("high tract") is a region in western and northern parts of Karnal district in northeastern area of Haryana state of India. All definitions of this area include Assandh, Nissing and Nilokheri Community Development Blocks (CDB) in western and northern parts of Karnal district, and it ends in the north of Karnal city at Indri where Nardak, Khadir and Bangar areas of Yamuna river basin meet. Sometimes, the definition of Nardak is broadened to include the territories of districts of Kurukshetra. Ambala, and Panchkula. This area is rich in fertile loamy soil. Nardak is the high tract, hence a sub-region of bangar (unflooded) region of Yamuna river basin.

During the Vedic era, it was part of Kuru janapada, hence presently has many Mahabharata era tirthas which are part of the wider 48 Kos Parikrama of Kurukshetra. Nardak area lies on either side of Grand Trunk Road.

== Etymology ==
According to Denzil Ibbetson, Nardak is a title of the Kurukshetra from the words "Nirdukh", meaning the "painless".

== History ==
Before the re-alignment of the Western Yamuna Canal (WYC), the Nardak area of Karnal comprised about 150,085 acres with 63 villages. The soil is of a loamy nature. During the British Raj the groundwater used to be saline and was not fit for irrigation. Presently, the area is irrigated by the freshwater from Western Yamuna Canal.

According to George Watt, a British Colonial botanist, this area has historically grown cotton.

According to Ihsan H. Nadiem, during Indian Rebellion of 1857 the Chauhans of Nardak assisted the British colonials, raised a regiment of cavalry, and provided 20 chowkidars to protect Karnal city and its Civil Lines. However, the natives of larger villages of area caused much anxiety to Britishers during the mutiny of 1857 - notably Siwan, Asandh, Jalmana, Gondar, Salwan, Bhalla , etc.

== Demography ==
The land-owners in the Nardak region have Jat, Brahmin, Rajput, Rors, and Punjabis. The Punjabis mostly came from present-day Pakistan after the partition of India in 1947.

The areas bordering Punjab are influenced by the Punjabi language and culture, while the areas near Himachal Pradesh, in Panchkula and Yamunanagar districts of Haryana, are influenced by the Sirmauri (Pahari) language.

== Ecology ==
Earlier, Nardak area was favorite among emperors for hunting lions. Area was also abundant in wolves, jackals and wild pigs. Presently, thus area has no lions, and forests have been converted to agricultural fields.

== See also ==
- Regions of Haryana
  - Ahirwal
  - Bagar tract
  - Deshwali
  - Mewat
- Yamuna
  - Doab
  - Khadir and Bangar
