= Nagla Roran =

- Village
- Location within Haryana Location within India
- Coordinates: 29°48′44″N 77°04′42″E
- Country: India
- State: Haryana
- District: Karnal
- Time zone: UTC+05:30 (IST)
- PincodeK: 132041

Nagla Roran is a village in Karnal District, Haryana, India.
