= Bajrang Lal Takhar =

Indian rower (born 1981)

Retd. Naib Subedar Bajrang Lal Takhar Padma Shri
Personal information
- Born: 5 January 1981 (age 45) Khatu, Sikar, Rajasthan, India
- Military career
- Allegiance: India
- Branch: Indian Army
- Rank: Naib Subedar
- Unit: Rajputana Rifles
- Awards: Padma Shri

Sport
- Sport: Rowing
Medal record
Representing India
Men's rowing
Asian Games
Gold medal – first place	2010 Guangzhou	Single sculls
Silver medal – second place	2006 Doha	Single sculls
Bronze medal – third place	2014 Incheon	Eight

Bajrang Lal Takhar (born 5 January 1981) is a retired Indian rower and coach. He is the first Indian to win an individual gold medal in rowing at the Asian Games. Previously, he won a silver medal at the 2006 Asian Games in Doha. Takhar represented India at the 2008 Summer Olympics in Beijing, competing in the men's single sculls. He has also won multiple gold medals at the South Asian Games and the Asian Championships.

A retired Naib Subedar in the Rajputana Rifles regiment of the Indian Army, Takhar was honored with the Arjuna Award in 2008 and the Padma Shri, India's fourth-highest civilian award, in 2013. He has coached notable rowers, including Balraj Panwar and Arjun Lal Jat.

== Career ==
Takhar began his rowing career while serving in the Indian Army's Rajputana Rifles regiment, where he practiced under the Army's Mission Olympic Programme. He rose through the national ranks to become one of India's leading rowers, representing the country in major international competitions for over a decade.

Takhar first major international success was the 11th Asian Rowing Championship held in Hyderabad, India (2005), winning one gold and two bronze medals. He followed this by securing one gold medal at the 12th Asian Rowing Championship in Chung-Ju, South Korea (2007), another gold medal at the 13th Asian Rowing Championship in Taipei, Taiwan (2009), and an additional gold medal at the 15th Asian Rowing Championship in Luan, China (2013).

At the 2006 Asian Games in Doha, Qatar, Takhar won the silver medal in the men's single sculls, becoming the first Indian rower to win an individual medal at the Asian Games. In the same year, at the 2006 South Asian Games in Colombo, Sri Lanka, he earned two gold medals in rowing events, helping India top the medal standings in the sport.

He represented India at the 2008 Summer Olympics in Beijing, where he competed in the men's single sculls, advancing to the quarterfinals and finishing 21st overall. Two years later, at the 2010 Asian Games in Guangzhou, China, Takhar won gold medal in the men's single sculls with a time of 7:04.78 minutes, marking India's first-ever gold medal in rowing at the Asian Games.

He was part of the Indian men's eight team that won the bronze medal at the 2014 Asian Games in Incheon, South Korea—his third consecutive podium finish at the Asian Games.

After retiring from active competition, Takhar transitioned into coaching and management, contributing to the development of Indian rowing. He served as coach and manager for national and junior teams at various events, including the 2019 Asian Rowing Championship in Chungju, South Korea, where Indian athletes won one gold, two silver, and two bronze medals under his supervision.

He has also worked to promote rowing in Rajasthan, his home state, and has been involved in plans for establishing a rowing academy to train young athletes. In 2024, he coached Indian rower Balraj Panwar, who qualified for the Paris Olympic Games in the men's single sculls.

== Awards ==
- 2008 – Arjun Award by Govt of India.
- 2013 – Padma Shri India's fourth highest civilian award from the Government of India.

== Rowing records ==
- 16/08 Men's Single Sculls Final Ranking (21st)
- 15/08 Men's Single Sculls Final D 7:09.73 (3rd)
- 13/08 Men's Single Sculls Semifinal – Heat 3 7:23.00 (4th)
- 11/08 Men's Single Sculls Quarterfinal – Heat 4 7:19.01 (5th)
- 09/08 Men's Single Sculls Preliminary Round – Heat 4 7:39.91 (3rd)
