= Gonder, Haryana =

Gonder Gautamnagar
- village
- Location in Haryana, India Gonder (India)
- Country: India
- State: Haryana
- District: Karnal
- Named for: Gautam Rishi
- Elevation: 237 m (778 ft)

Population (2011)
  - Total: 18,000

Languages
  - Official: Hindi
- Time zone: UTC+5:30 (IST)
- Postal code: 132024
- Telephone code: +91-01745-XXXXXX
- Vehicle registration: HR-05
- Sex Ratio: 904:1000 ♂/♀
- Website: haryana.gov.in

Gonder is a village in Karnal district, Haryana, India with a population of approximately 30,000. It is an historical village, named for Gautam Rishi. The Chauhan clan from Rajput dynasty has a population of 12,000. Brahmin voters are also dominated in this village, with others castes having a population of 18,000. Rajput is the main caste. The main occupation is agriculture. Though it has poor air quality, the carbon monoxide and Sulphur Dioxide levels are less.

Three politicians from this village have so far been elected as MLAs. However, the village still faces caste based discrimination of lower caste people, especially Dalits. In April 2021, there was a proposal to develop the village pond along with three others, as a model pond by the Karnal civic body.
