= Harwinder =

Harwinder is a given name. Notable people with the name include:

- Harwinder Kalyan (born 1967), Indian politician
- Harwinder Sandhu, Canadian politician
