= Gagsina =

- Location in Haryana, India
- Coordinates: 29°33′N 76°53′E
- District: Karnal
- Settled: Ancient

Government
  - Governor: Kaptan Singh Solanki
- Elevation: 244 m (801 ft)

Population
  - Total: 7,698

Languages
  - Official: Hindi
- Time zone: UTC+5:30 (IST)
- PIN: 132114
- ISO 3166 code: IN-HR
- Distance from Delhi: 125.1 kilometres (77.7 mi)
- Distance from Mumbai: 1,500.7 kilometres (932.5 mi)

Gagsina is the notified area committee in Gharaunda tehsil in Karnal district, Haryana, India. It is one of 55 villages in Gharaunda block and is located 20 km south from district headquarters in Karnal, 10 km from Gharaunda and 153 km from state capital Chandigarh. The postal code of the area is 132114. The main occupation of the people residing in the village is agriculture.

== History ==
The area has the ancient history and dates back to the time when people initially starting residing in Haryana. The major population of the area is Sandhus (clan). Historical monuments in the form of ancient temples viz.दादा काला सन्धू can also be seen in the area.

== Geography ==
Gagsina is surrounded by Karnal Tehsil towards North, Madlauda Tehsil towards South, Nissing At Chirao Tehsil towards North, Panipat Tehsil towards South. Nearby villages include Khora Kheri (4 km), Staundi (4 km), Anchla (4 km), Phurlak (5 km), Picholia Two streams can also be seen named कच्ची नदी, पक्की नदी।(5 km). Gagsina is situated at the R.L. of 244 m above mean sea level.

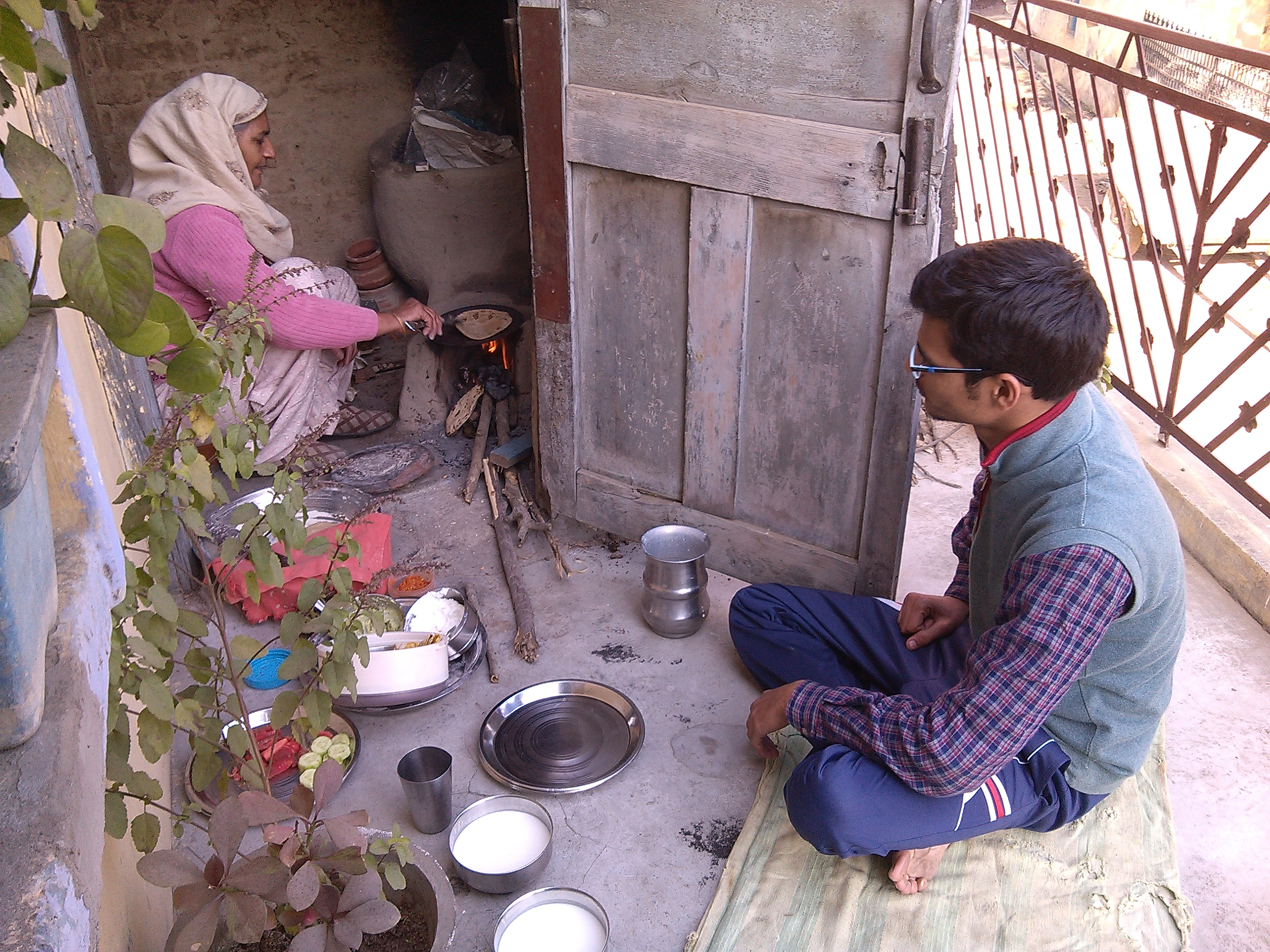
Food preparation on traditional stove i.e. Chullah

== Demographics ==
As per Population Census 2011, Gagsina has the population of 7,698, of which 4,088 are males, while 3,610 are females. In Gagsina 11.60% of total population is under 6 years of age. Gagsina has the average literacy rate of was 75.87% compared to 75.55% of Haryana and higher than the national average of 59.5%. In Gagsina Male literacy stands at 85.99% while female literacy rate was 64.57%. The average sex ratio of Gagsina is 883 females per 1000 males which is higher than Haryana state average of 879 females per 1,000 males. Child Sex Ratio for the Gagsina as per census is 793 females per 1,000 males, lower than Haryana average of 834 females per 1,000 males. Schedule Caste (SC) constitutes 11.69% of total population in Gagsina. The area currently doesn't have any Schedule Tribe (ST) population.

Hindi the official language in the area. People also speak other Indo- Aryan regional languages like Haryanvi and Punjabi.

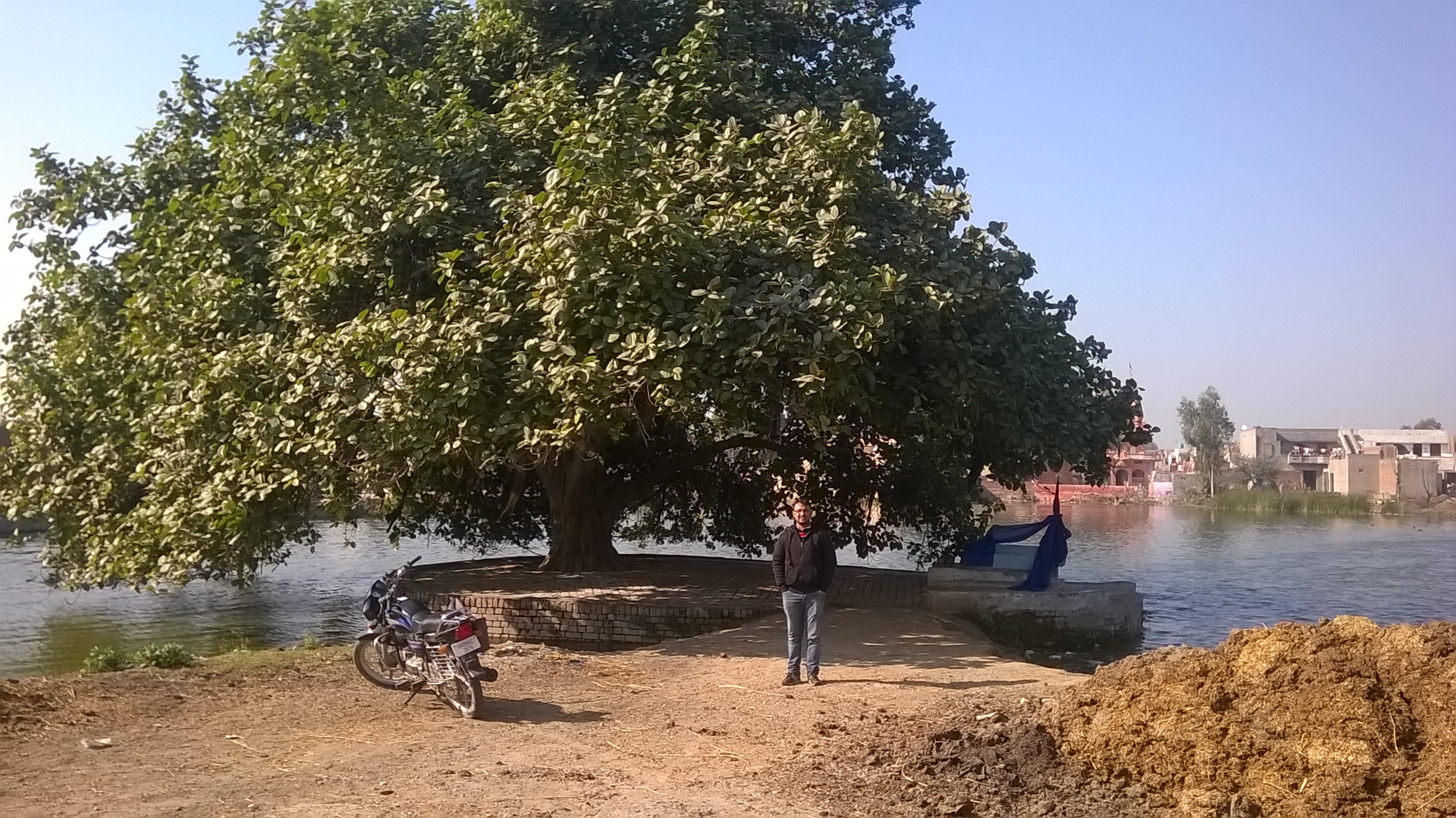
Jod in Gagsina village . In a village, you may find more than 03 Jod

== Government ==
As per constitution of India and Panchyati Raaj Act, the area is administrated by Sarpanch (Head of Village) who is elected representative of village under the government of Haryana.

== Economy ==
The work profile is scattered in different activities from agriculture labourers to engineers and doctors. In Gagsina, out of total population, 2,205 were engaged in work activities. 84.04% of workers describe their work as Main Work (employment or earning more than 6 Months) while 15.96% were involved in marginal activity providing livelihood for less than 6 months. Of 2,205 workers engaged in main Work, 1,116 were cultivators (owner or co-owner) while 263 were agricultural labourers.

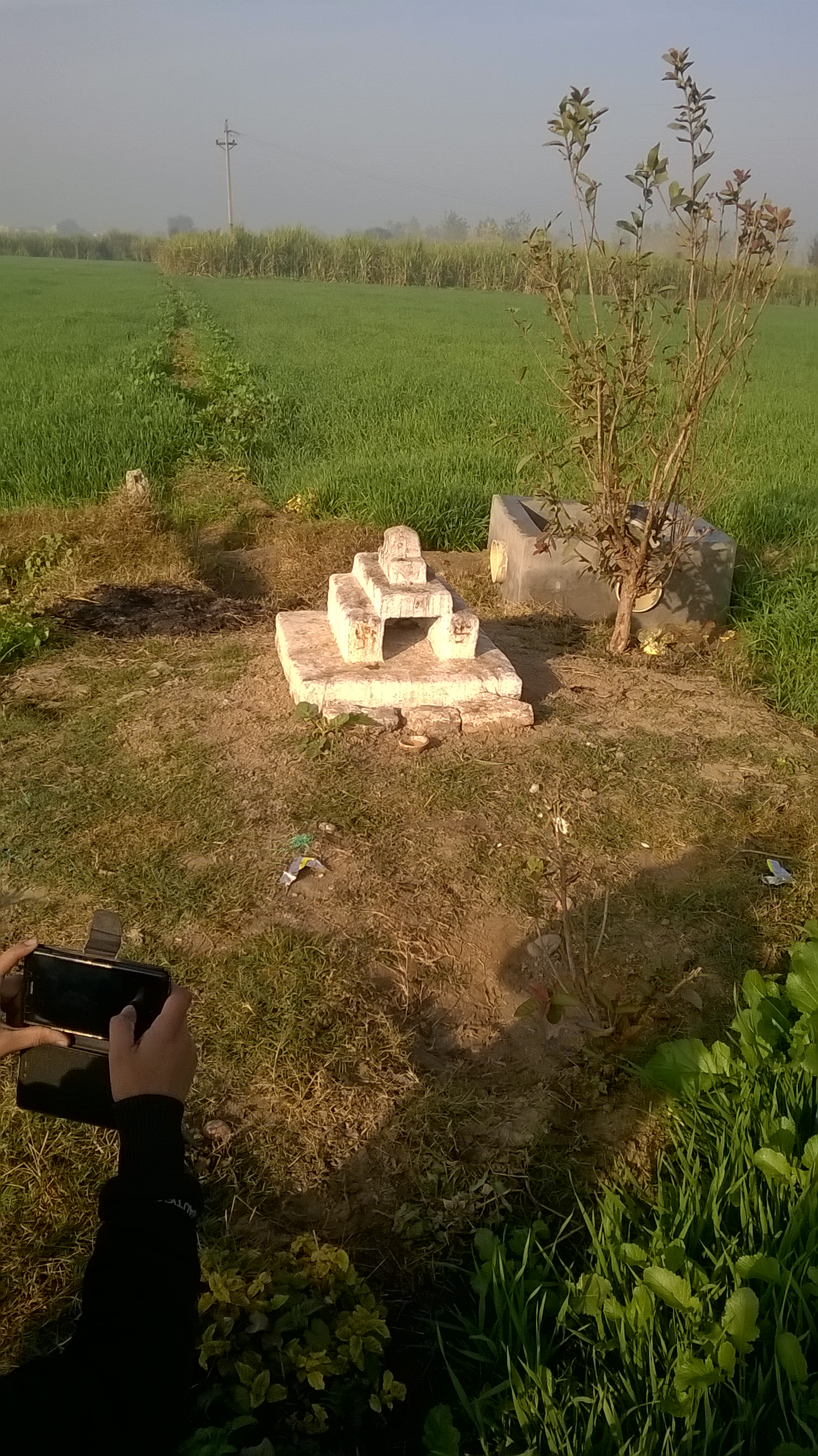
Traditional Pitra in one of the farms of Gagsina to protect village from negativity

== Education ==
- Govt. Girls High School, Gagsina
- Maharishi Dayanand Senior Secondary School, Gagsina
- Adarsh Public School, Gagsina
- Gagsina Senior Secondary School Gagsina

== Transport ==
=== Roadway ===
State Road Transport Cooperation of Haryana provides regular bus services in the area from different significantly important places of the state.

=== Railway ===
Gharaunda railway station is the nearby railway stations to Gagsina. However Panipat Junction railway station on Ambala-Delhi line is major railway station 22 km away.

=== Airway ===
The nearest Airport is in State capital Chandigarh 122 km away. Delhi International Airport can also be easily accessed from the area.

== See also ==
- E-Max School of Engineering and Applied Research
