= Liberty Shoes =

Indian footwear company

- Type: Public
- Traded as: NSE: LIBERTSHOE; BSE: 526596
- ISIN: INE557B01019
- Industry: Footwear
- Founded: 1954; 72 years ago
- Founder: Dharam Pal Gupta, Purshotam Das Gupta, and Rajkumar Bansal
- Headquarters: Karnal, Haryana, India
- Area served: Worldwide
- Key people: Raman Bansal (COO)
- Revenue: ▲₹750 crore (US$78 million)
- Parent: Liberty Group
- Website: www.libertyshoes.com

Liberty Shoes is an Indian multinational footwear company, based in Karnal, Haryana. Founded in 1954, the company operates multi-brand outlets and showrooms in India, with 50 showrooms located outside India.

Liberty has six manufacturing facilities–two in Gharaunda and Liberty Puram (Haryana), where its primary and the largest manufacturing units are situated, Paonta Sahib, (Himachal Pradesh), and two in Roorkee (Uttarakhand).

== Company ==
Liberty Shoes Limited is an Indian footwear manufacturer and retailer engaged in the design, development, manufacturing, marketing and distribution of footwear and related lifestyle products. Headquartered in Karnal, Haryana, the company operates an integrated business model encompassing product development, manufacturing, wholesale distribution, organised retail, exports and e-commerce.

Since its establishment in 1954, Liberty Shoes has evolved from a regional footwear manufacturer into one of India's longstanding footwear companies. The business expanded through manufacturing investments, the development of a nationwide distribution network, and the introduction of a multi-brand portfolio addressing different consumer segments. The company is listed on both the Bombay Stock Exchange and the National Stock Exchange of India.

Liberty's business is organised around multiple footwear categories including formal footwear, casual footwear, athleisure, comfort footwear, children's footwear, school footwear and industrial safety footwear. Products are marketed through proprietary brands, enabling the company to address different consumer demographics, price points and usage occasions. This multi-brand strategy, introduced during the 1990s, represented a shift from a single-brand footwear company to a diversified consumer footwear business.

The company's manufacturing operations are supported by facilities located in Haryana, Himachal Pradesh and Uttarakhand. According to company disclosures, these facilities collectively manufacture more than 60,000 pairs of footwear per day and incorporate product design, material development, quality assurance and testing processes. Product development activities are undertaken through the Liberty Innovation Lab, where the company develops footwear technologies, materials and construction techniques for commercial production.

Liberty Shoes distributes its products through a multi-channel retail network comprising exclusive brand outlets, franchise-operated stores, distributors, multi-brand retailers and digital commerce platforms. According to the company's FY2025 corporate profile, the distribution network includes more than 500 exclusive stores, over 100 distributors and approximately 7,000 multi-brand outlets, while the company's products are available in more than 25 international markets.

The company has expanded its business through both manufacturing capacity and brand development. During the 1990s and 2000s it introduced specialised brands serving formal, casual, sports, comfort, children's and industrial footwear segments. In recent years Liberty has expanded into the athleisure and comfort categories through brands including Leap7X and Healers while investing in proprietary product platforms such as NitPro cushioning, Twist & Go fastening systems, EasyGo slip-in footwear and H-Tech comfort technologies. These technologies are described by the company as proprietary product innovations.

As of FY2024–25, the company reported revenue from operations of ₹675 crore, its highest annual revenue reported to date. According to the company's investor presentation, current strategic priorities include strengthening omnichannel retailing, expanding international operations, improving manufacturing efficiency, and increasing investment in innovation and product development.

== Manufacturing ==
Liberty Shoes manufactures footwear through a network of production facilities located in the Indian states of Haryana, Himachal Pradesh and Uttarakhand. The company's principal manufacturing units are situated at Libertypuram and Gharaunda in Haryana, Paonta Sahib in Himachal Pradesh, and Roorkee in Uttarakhand. These facilities produce footwear for both the domestic and export markets.

Liberty has an installed production capacity of more than 60,000 pairs of footwear per day. The manufacturing network produces a broad range of products including formal shoes, casual footwear, sports shoes, school footwear, sandals, slippers, comfort footwear and industrial safety footwear.

The company's manufacturing operations follow an integrated production model encompassing product design, raw-material sourcing, cutting, stitching, assembly, finishing and quality assurance. According to Liberty, quality control

Liberty also operates the Liberty Innovation Lab, which undertakes footwear research, product design, material evaluation and performance testing. The facility supports the development of proprietary footwear technologies, construction techniques and product platforms used across the company's brands.

Over the years, Liberty has expanded its manufacturing infrastructure in response to domestic demand and export growth. In 2006, the company announced plans to establish additional manufacturing units in northern India to increase production capacity and strengthen its supply chain.

The manufacturing facilities support Liberty's multi-brand portfolio and produce footwear across multiple consumer segments including formal, casual, athleisure, children's, comfort and industrial safety categories. Products manufactured at these facilities are supplied through the company's domestic retail network and export channels.

== Distribution ==
Liberty Shoes operates a multi-channel distribution network comprising exclusive brand outlets, franchise-operated stores, distributors, multi-brand retailers, institutional sales and e-commerce platforms. According to the company's corporate profile, the distribution network includes more than 500 exclusive showrooms, over 100 distributors and more than 7,000 multi-brand outlets across India.

The company expanded its organised retail presence during the 2000s through the establishment of Liberty Retail Revolutions Limited (LRRL), which was created to strengthen company-operated retail stores while continuing to develop the franchise network. This expansion complemented Liberty's traditional wholesale business and increased the company's direct engagement with consumers.

Liberty distributes footwear through multiple retail formats, including exclusive Liberty stores, franchised outlets, large-format retailers, independent footwear dealers and online marketplaces. The company's products are also available through its direct-to-consumer website and third-party e-commerce platforms.

Internationally, Liberty exports footwear to more than 25 countries across Asia, the Middle East, Africa and Europe through distributors and retail partners. According to company disclosures, export markets continue to form an important component of the company's business strategy, supported by its domestic manufacturing base and international distribution network.

In recent years, Liberty has adopted an omnichannel retail strategy integrating physical stores with digital commerce. According to the company's investor presentation, strategic priorities include expanding direct-to-consumer sales, strengthening marketplace partnerships and enhancing customer engagement through digital platforms.

The company's distribution strategy supports its portfolio of footwear brands across different price points and consumer segments, enabling nationwide availability through organised retail, traditional trade and digital channels.
