= Katleri =

Subdistrict of Tallinn, Estonia

- Subdistrict of Tallinn
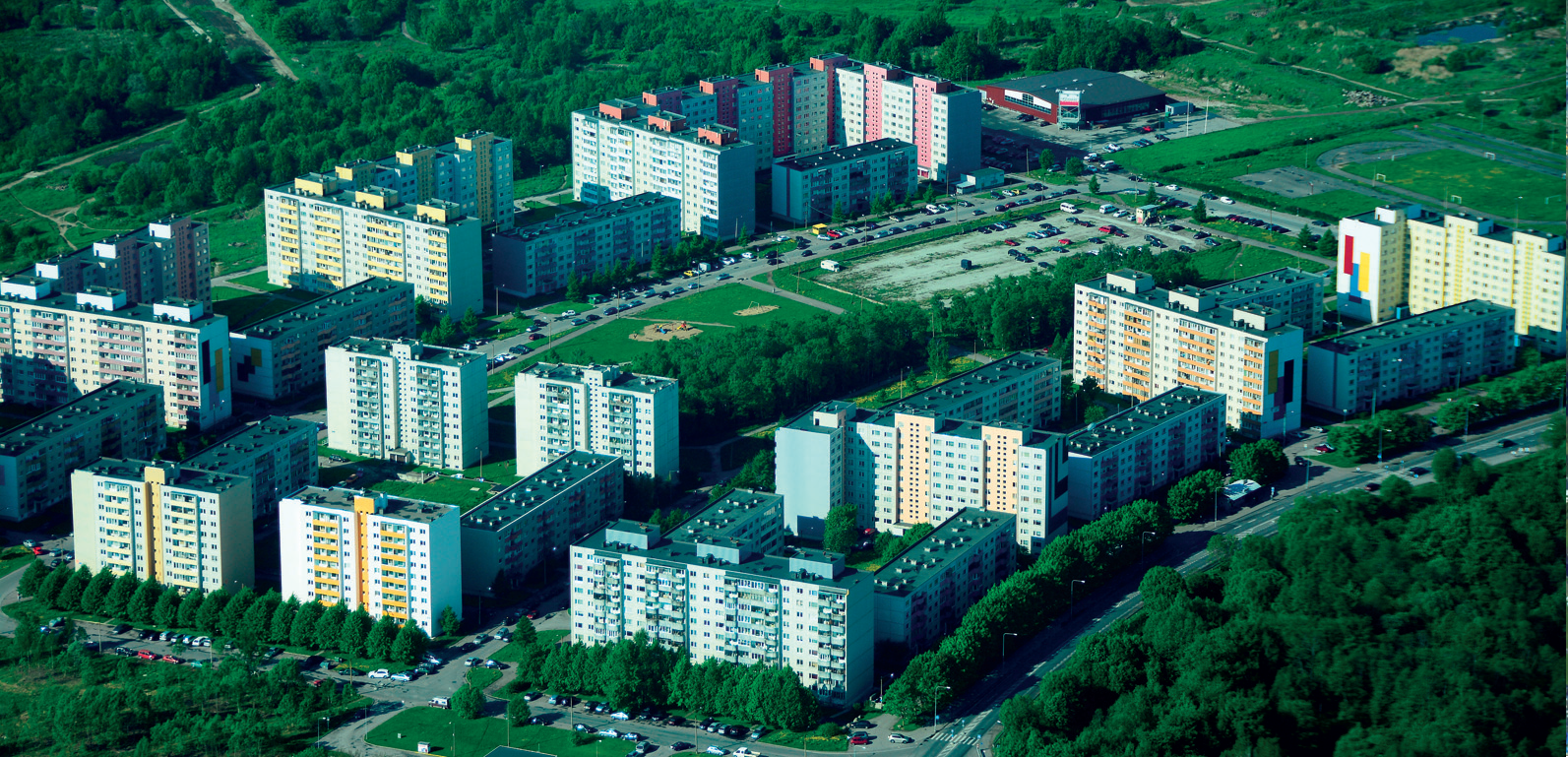
- Aerial view of Katleri

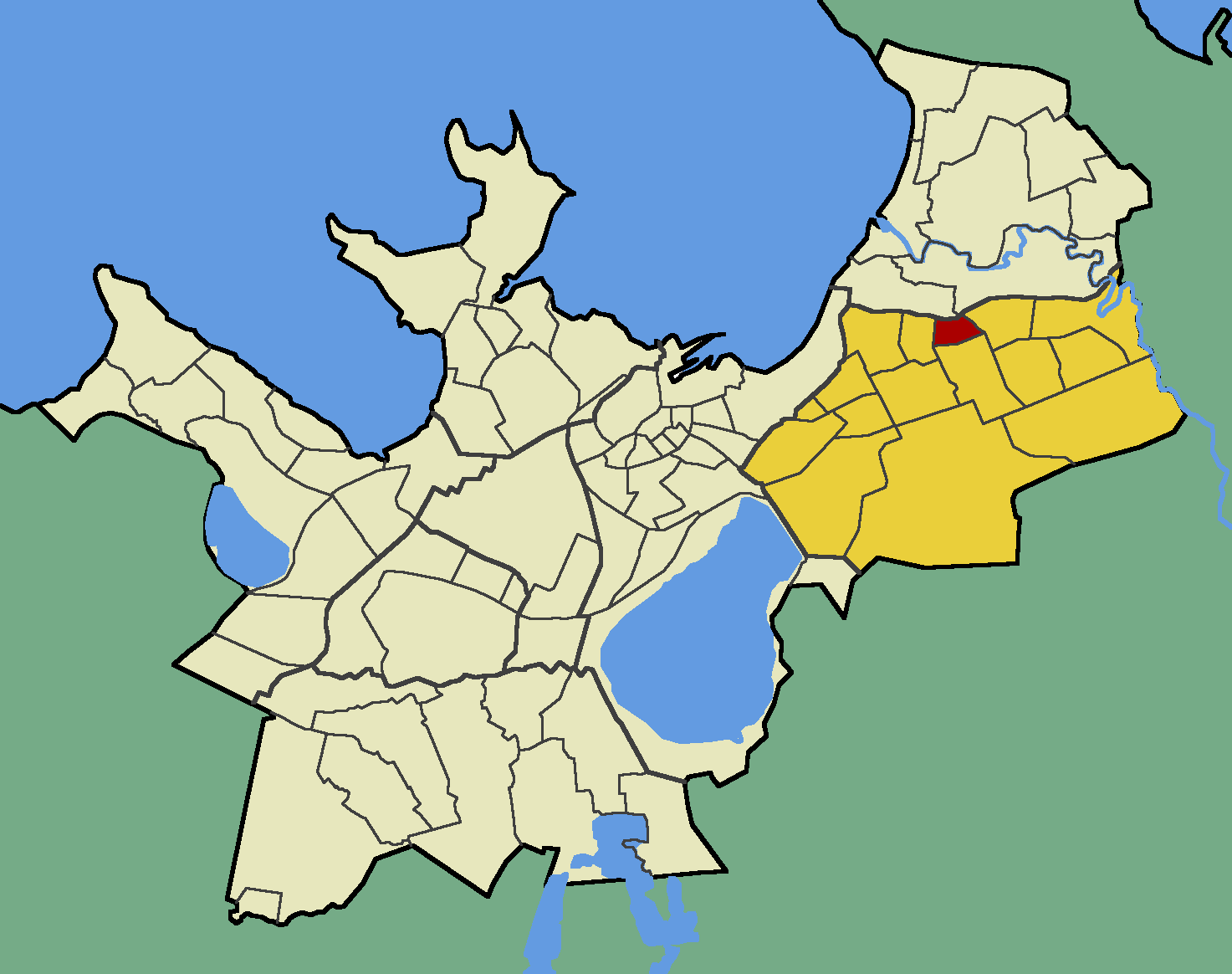
- Katleri within Lasnamäe District
- Coordinates: 59.4498°N 24.8501°E
- Country: Estonia
- County: Harju County
- City: Tallinn
- District: Lasnamäe

Population (01.01.2014)
  - Total: 5,133

Katleri is a subdistrict (Estonian: asum) in the district of Lasnamäe, Tallinn, the capital of Estonia. As of 1 January 2014, it had a population of 5,133.

== Gallery ==
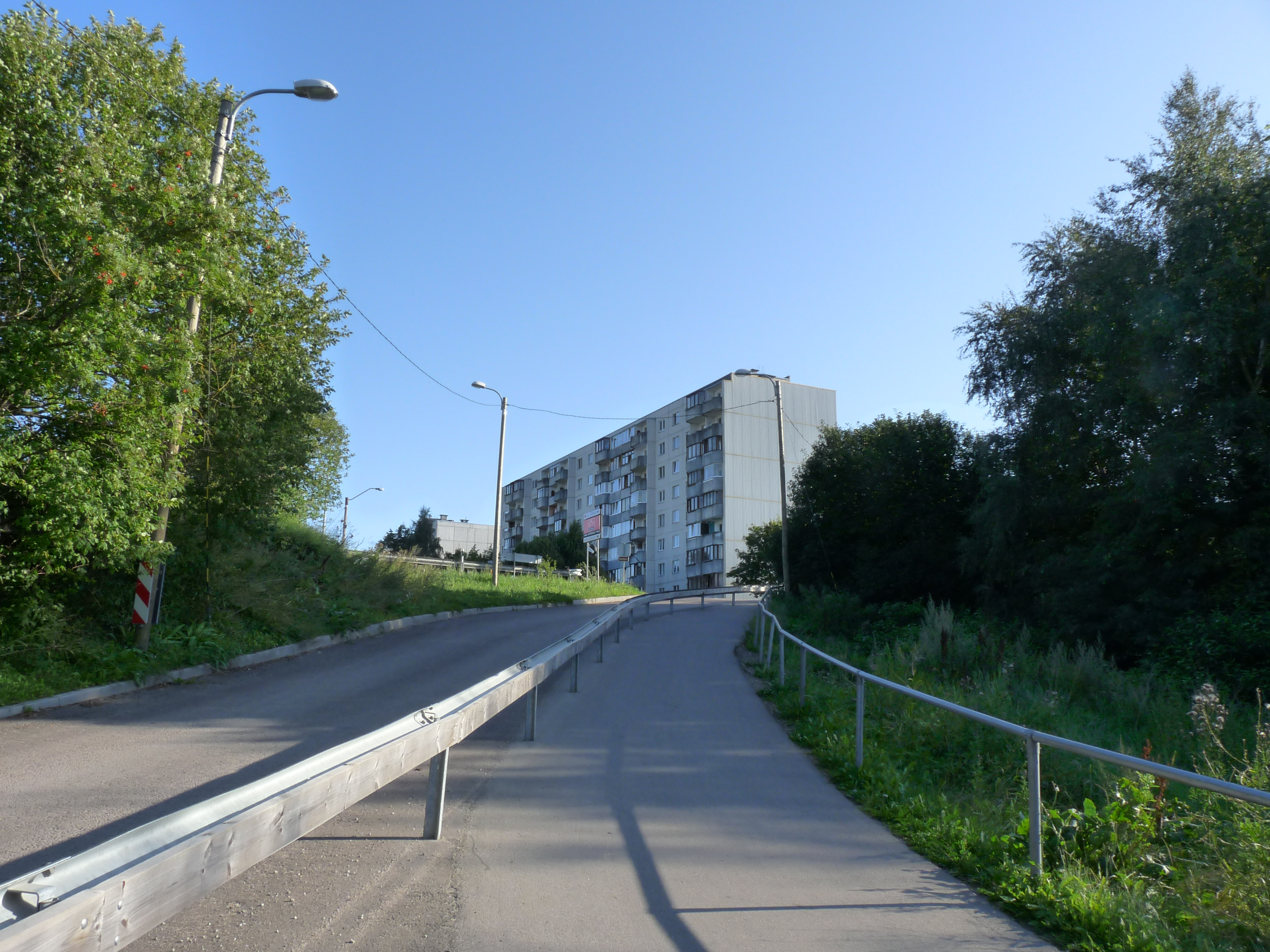
Downhill to Pirita

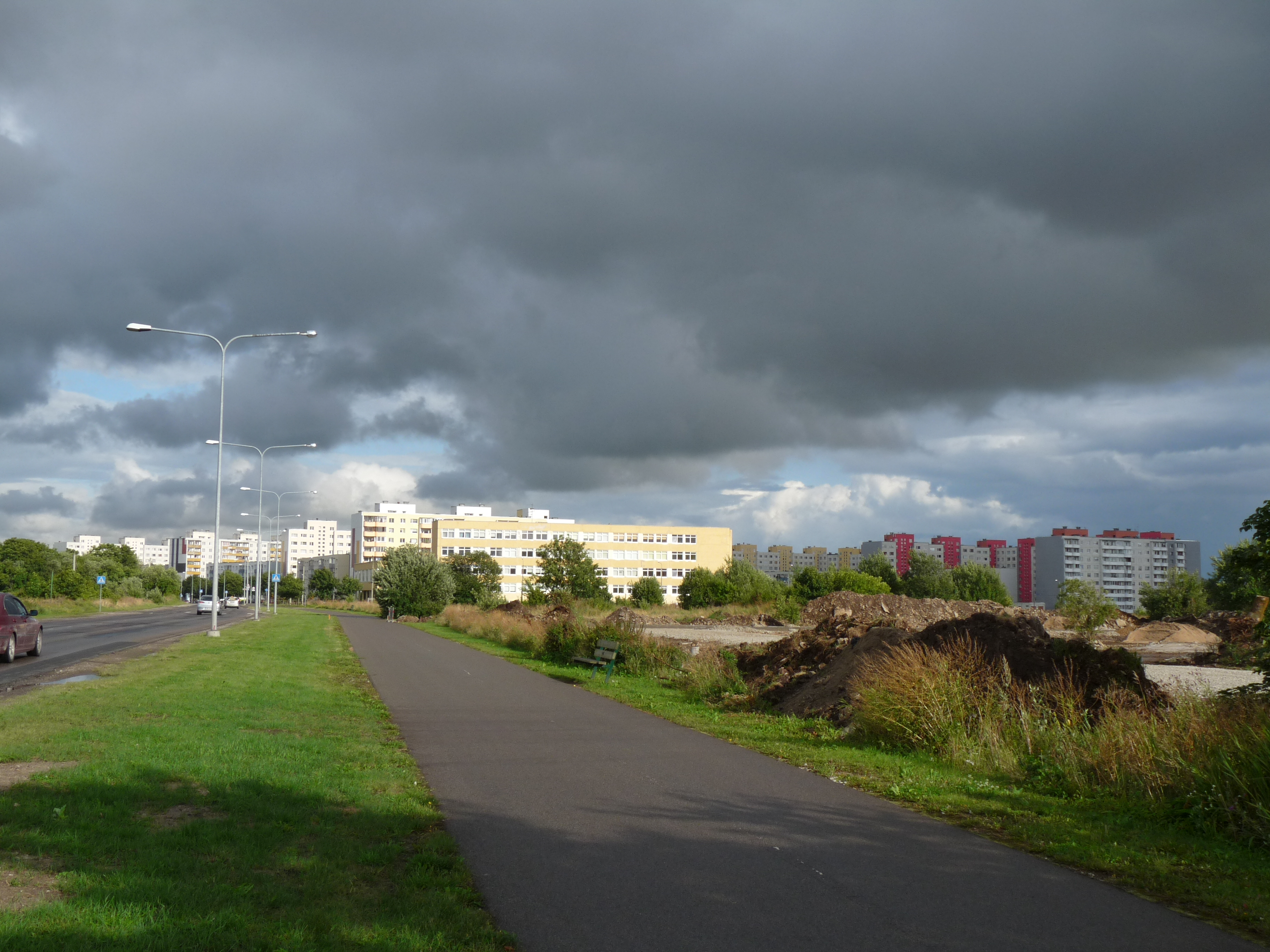
Katleri seen from Loopealse
