= Rowing at the 2014 Asian Games – Men's eight =

Men's eight at the 2014 Asian Games
- Venue: Tangeum Lake
- Date: 21–25 September 2014
- Competitors: 45 from 5 nations

Medalists
gold medal	China; Cheng Xunman, Yang Dongdong, Zhao Longjie, Feng Jiahui, Ni Xulin, Liu Hang, Yang Zengxin, Li Dongjian, Zhang Shetian
silver medal	Japan; Yu Kataoka, Yusuke Imai, Sumito Nakamura, Baku Hiraki, Mitsuo Nishimura, Kiyotaka Ito, Masato Kobayashi, Kenta Tadachi, Hiroki Sasano
bronze medal	India; Kapil Sharma, Ranjit Singh, Bajrang Lal Takhar, P. U. Robin, Sawan Kumar Kalkal, Azad Mohammed, Maninder Singh, Davinder Singh, Ahmed Mohammed

The men's eight competition at the 2014 Asian Games in Chungju, South Korea was held from 21 September to 25 September at the Tangeum Lake International Rowing Center.

== Schedule ==
All times are Korea Standard Time (UTC+09:00)

Date	Time	Event
Sunday, 21 September 2014	11:40	Heat
Thursday, 25 September 2014	12:15	Final

== Results ==
=== Heat ===
- Qualification: 1–5 → Final (FA)

Rank	Team	Time	Notes
1	China (CHN); Cheng Xunman; Yang Dongdong; Zhao Longjie; Feng Jiahui; Ni Xulin; Liu Hang; Yang Zengxin; Li Dongjian; Zhang Shetian	5:46.01	FA
2	India (IND); Kapil Sharma; Ranjit Singh; Bajrang Lal Takhar; P. U. Robin; Sawan Kumar Kalkal; Azad Mohammed; Maninder Singh; Davinder Singh; Ahmed Mohammed	5:53.58	FA
3	Japan (JPN); Yu Kataoka; Yusuke Imai; Sumito Nakamura; Baku Hiraki; Mitsuo Nishimura; Kiyotaka Ito; Masato Kobayashi; Kenta Tadachi; Hiroki Sasano	5:53.79	FA
4	Uzbekistan (UZB); Abbosjon Sanakulov; Shekhroz Hakimov; Yokub Khamzaev; Islambek Mambetnazarov; Abdurasul Muhammadiev; Dostonjon Bahriev; Botir Murodov; Zafar Usmonov; Dostonjon Khursanov	6:01.39	FA
5	Iran (IRI); Saeid Adeli; Yaser Johari; Masoud Mohammadi; Afshar Heidari; Atabak Pishyar; Farhad Gholizadeh; Farzad Gholizadeh; Vahid Johari; Keyhan Shamsi	6:05.41	FA

=== Final ===
Rank	Team	Time
1st place, gold medalist(s)	China (CHN); Cheng Xunman; Yang Dongdong; Zhao Longjie; Feng Jiahui; Ni Xulin; Liu Hang; Yang Zengxin; Li Dongjian; Zhang Shetian	5:46.70
2nd place, silver medalist(s)	Japan (JPN); Yu Kataoka; Yusuke Imai; Sumito Nakamura; Baku Hiraki; Mitsuo Nishimura; Kiyotaka Ito; Masato Kobayashi; Kenta Tadachi; Hiroki Sasano	5:50.04
3rd place, bronze medalist(s)	India (IND); Kapil Sharma; Ranjit Singh; Bajrang Lal Takhar; P. U. Robin; Sawan Kumar Kalkal; Azad Mohammed; Maninder Singh; Davinder Singh; Ahmed Mohammed	5:51.84
4	Uzbekistan (UZB); Abbosjon Sanakulov; Shekhroz Hakimov; Yokub Khamzaev; Islambek Mambetnazarov; Abdurasul Muhammadiev; Dostonjon Bahriev; Botir Murodov; Zafar Usmonov; Dostonjon Khursanov	6:00.65
5	Iran (IRI); Saeid Adeli; Yaser Johari; Masoud Mohammadi; Afshar Heidari; Atabak Pishyar; Farhad Gholizadeh; Farzad Gholizadeh; Vahid Johari; Keyhan Shamsi	6:01.41
