= Loopealse =

Subdistrict of Tallinn, Estonia

Coordinates: 59.448086°N 24.838114°E

- Subdistrict of Tallinn
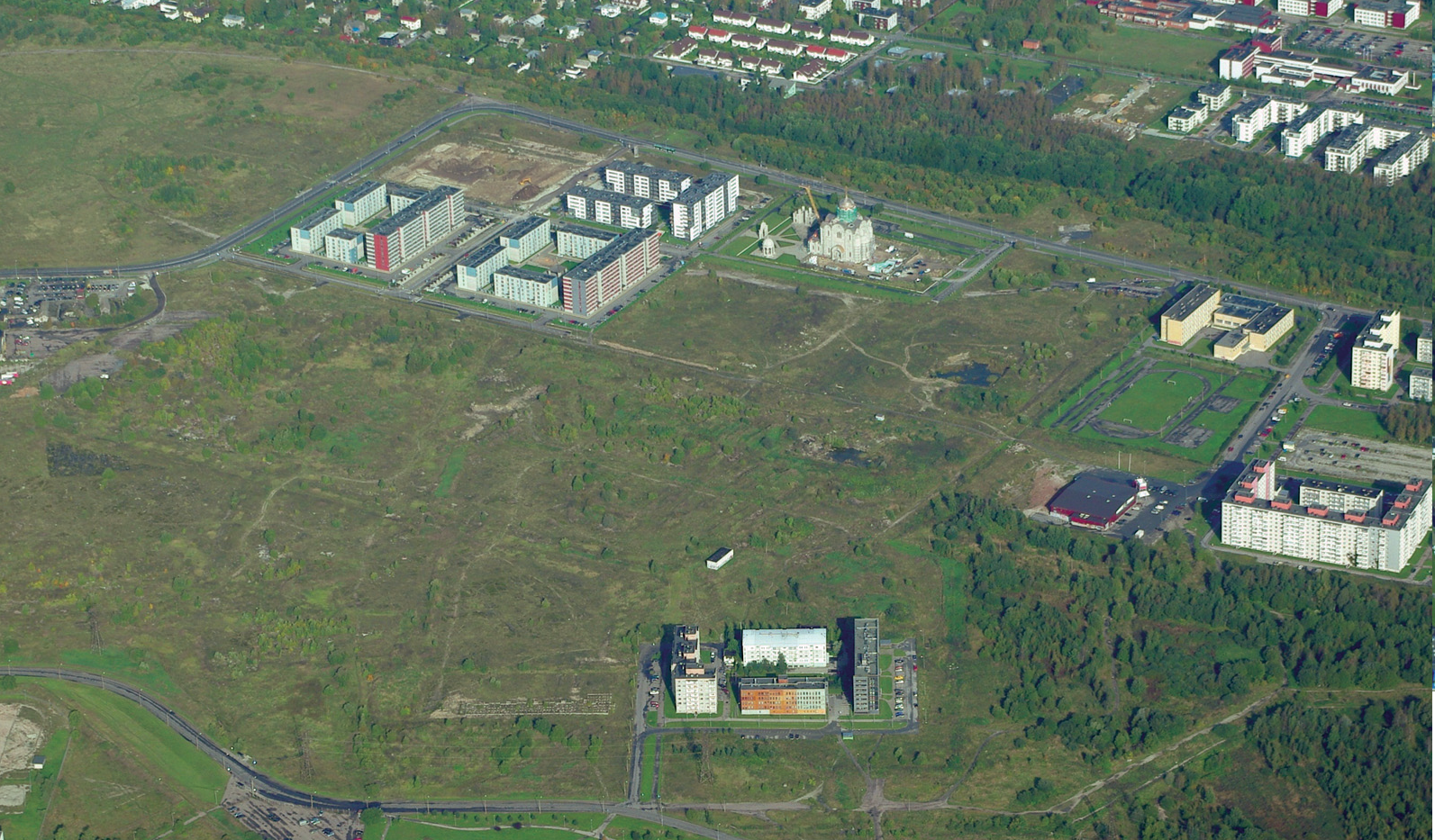

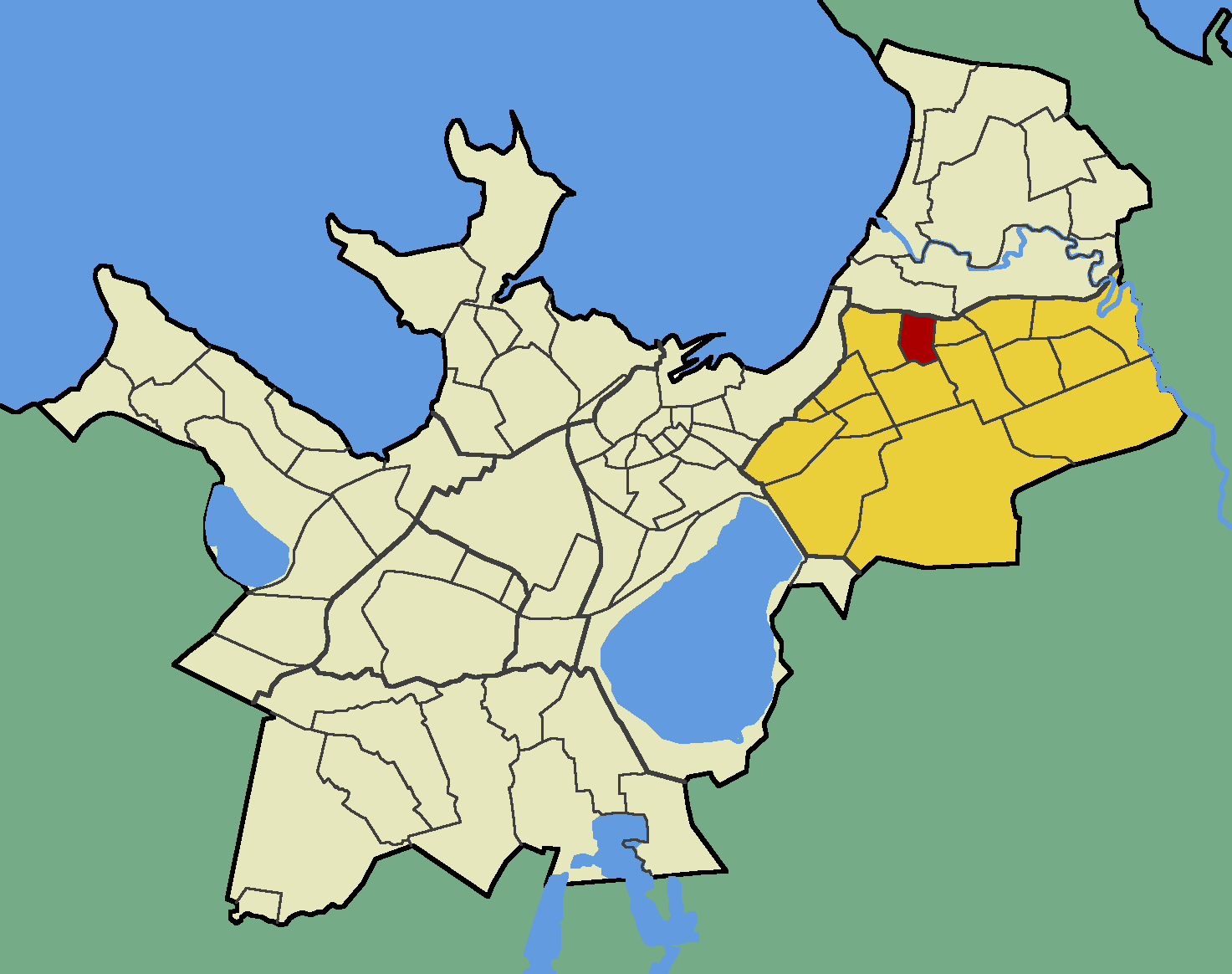
- Loopealse within Lasnamäe District.
- Country: Estonia
- County: Harju County
- City: Tallinn
- District: Lasnamäe

Population (2014)
  - Total: 2,388

Loopealse (Estonian for "Alvar", literally "Above Alvar") is a subdistrict (Estonian: asum) in the district of Lasnamäe, Tallinn, the capital of Estonia. As of 1 January 2014, it has a population of 2,388.

== Gallery ==
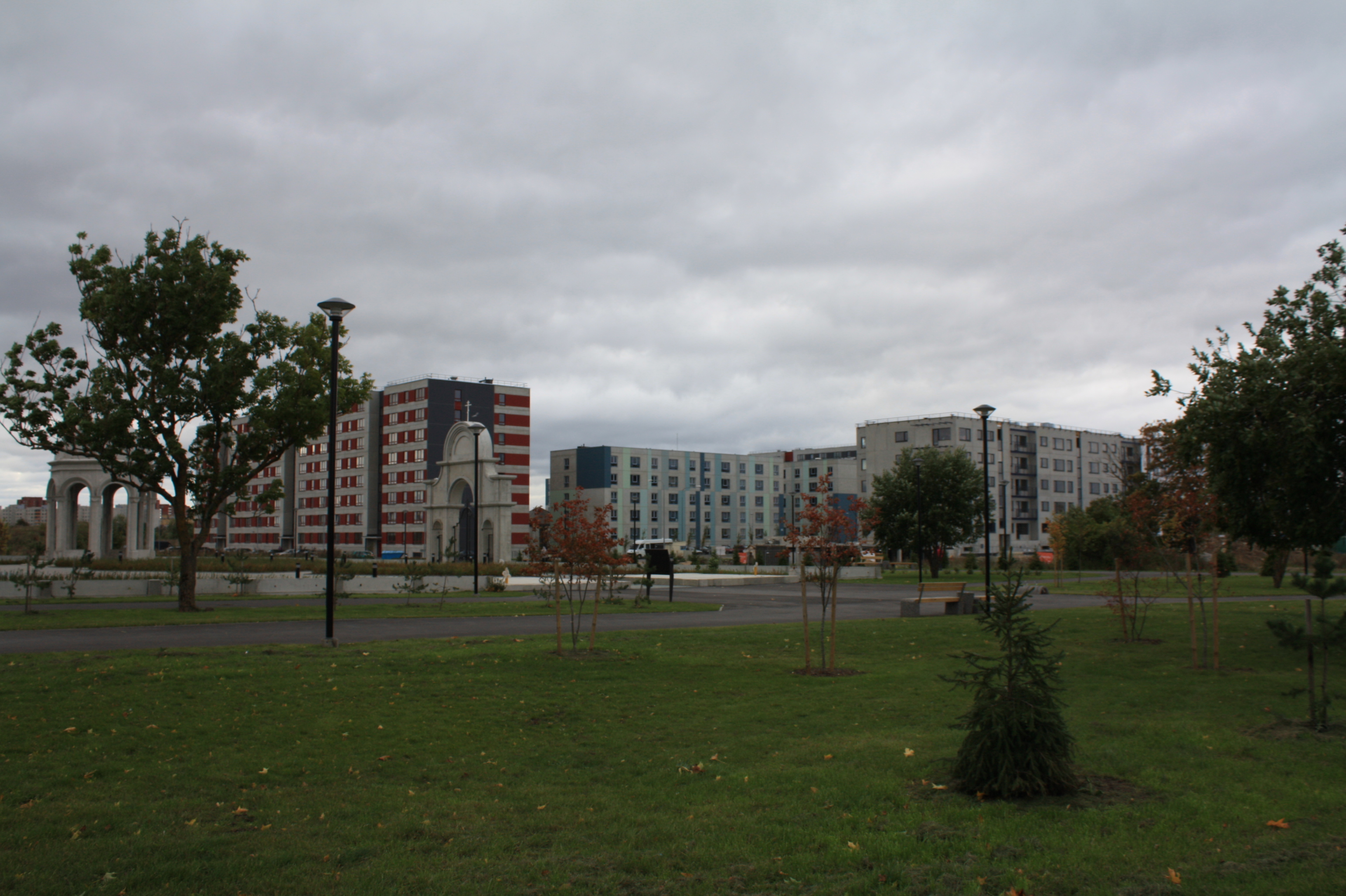

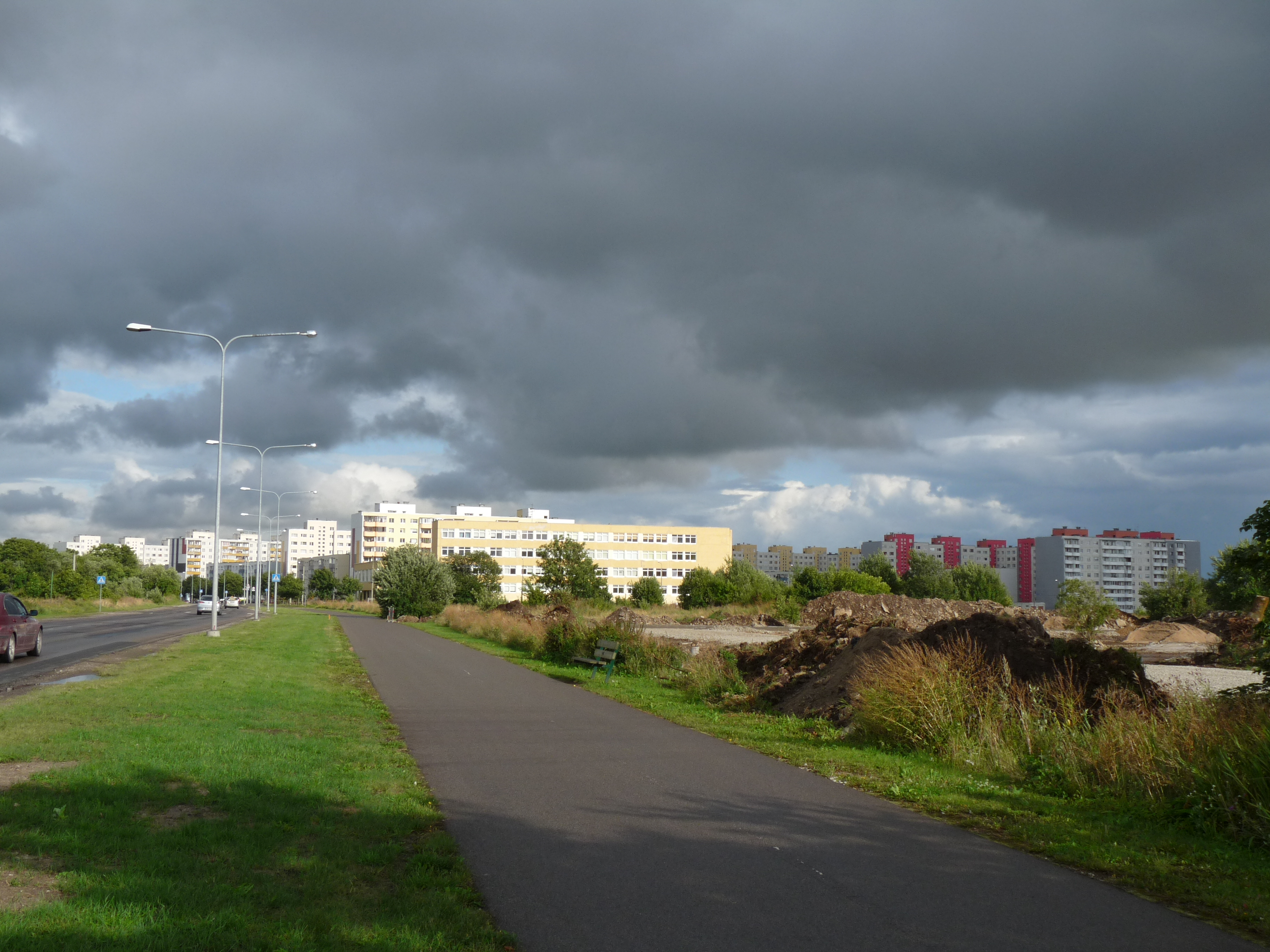
View from Loopealse to Katleri

The construction of the Church of the Icon of the Mother of God "Quick to Hearken" in 2009.

== See also ==
- Church of the Icon of the Mother of God "Quick to Hearken"
