= Harvinder Mankkar =

Indian cartoonist, writer and director

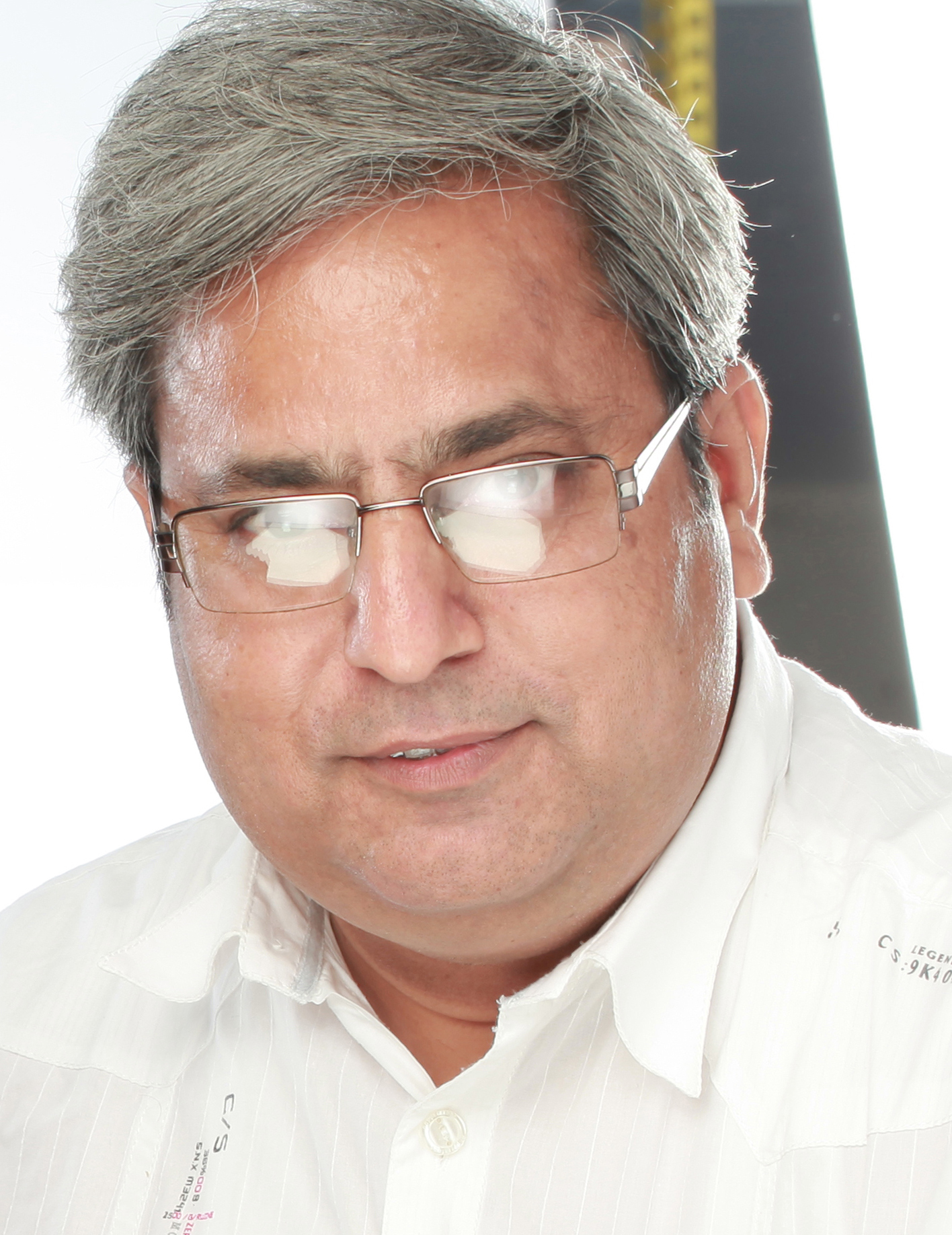
- Born: 27 April 1964 (age 62); Delhi, India
- Occupations: Cartoonist, illustrator, script-writer, film director
- Years active: 1980–present
- Website: http://harvindermankkar.com

Harvinder Mankkar (born 27 April 1964) is an Indian cartoonist, illustrator, script-writer and film director. He is known for his comic series characters Motu Patlu published in Lot Pot magazine. Its 3D animated television series adaptation is airing on Nickelodeon. He has illustrated almost 22,000 pocket cartoons, comic strips, educational books and story books. He is founder and CEO of The Art Studio company. Also, he is the Creative Director and Chief Illustrator for Lot Pot magazine. He is editorial director of the film magazine Mayapuri.

== Work ==
Mankkar's work included feature films such as Hair is Falling and promotions such as Toonpur ka Superhero.

- Hair is Falling (2011)

== Awards and recognition ==
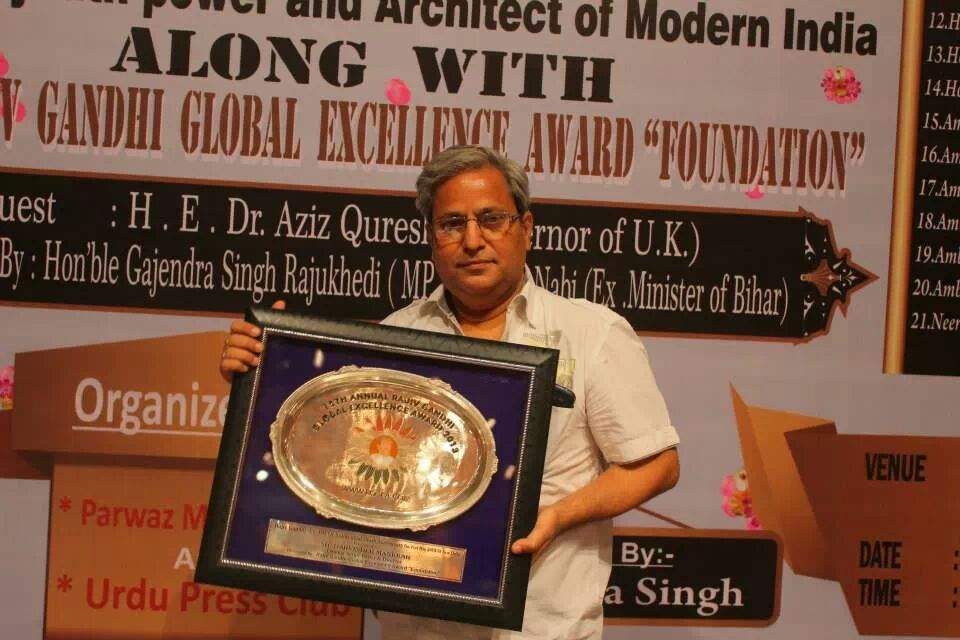
Harvinder Mankkar honored with Rajiv Gandhi Global Excellence Award 2013

- Rajiv Gandhi Global Excellence Awards 2013
