= Jundla =

Jundala
- village
- Location in Haryana, India Jundala (India)
- Country: India
- State: Haryana
- District: Karnal
- Elevation: 237 m (778 ft)

Languages
  - Official: Hindi
- Time zone: UTC+5:30 (IST)
- Postal code: 132001
- Telephone code: +91-01745-XXXXXX
- Vehicle registration: HR-05
- Sex Ratio: 904:1000 ♂/♀
- Website: haryana.gov.in

Jundla is a town in the Karnal district of the Indian state of Haryana about 15 kilometers.
