= Sangroli =

- village
- Location in Haryana, India Sangroli (India)
- Coordinates: 29.81011°N 76.64325°E
- Country: India
- State: Haryana
- District: Kaithal
- Elevation: 248 m (814 ft)

Languages
  - Official: English, Hindi, Punjabi
- Time zone: UTC+5:30 (IST)
- PIN: 136021
- Telephone code: 91-1746
- ISO 3166 code: IN-HR
- Vehicle registration: HR-08
- Nearest city: Pundri
- Website: haryana.gov.in

Sangroli is a village under Panchayat samiti in Kaithal district in the Indian state of Haryana. In the past, it was under the jurisdiction of Kurukshetra and Karnal districts. Sangroli is about 44 km west from Karnal, 25.6 km south-west from Kurukshetra and 11.2 km from the nearest city Pundri. The primary language spoken here is Hindi (national language) and Haryanvi. Other languages which may be heard here are English and Punjabi.

== Major facts ==
Sangroli is a large village with a population of about 6000 people. The people of this village are very kind and they live in complete harmony. In the ancient times, this village was known for its lake named Shravan Kumar Lake. It was the place where Raja Dashratha had killed Shravan Kumar. More than 1000 people have settled abroad in countries like Canada, USA, Australia, New Zealand, United Kingdom, Germany, Singapore, Malaysia and Italy. This village is also a home of many scholars and over 85% of the people are highly educated. The water supply in Sangroli is good and managed by the Haryana Government and Panchayat samiti and the rest of the demand is met by private and public tube wells and hand pumps.

== Educational and Health infrastructure ==
Sangroli has one higher secondary co-education school and one middle school for girls, other than these there are two private co-education schools also. The people are well educated and these educated people are in respectful government professions such as being in Military Forces like The Indian Air Force, Indian Army, and they are also performing as doctors, engineers, scientists, and policemen. There is also a medical facility for villagers and one veterinary care.

== Geographical and Historical Things ==
Sangroli is located at 29.81011°N 76.64325°E. It has an average elevation of 248 metres (814 feet). Sangroli has a humid subtropical climate characterized by a seasonal rhythm: very hot summers, mild winters, unreliable rainfall and great variation in temperature about (0.5−43 °C). During monsoon (from mid-June to mid-September), Sangroli receives moderate to heavy rainfall and sometimes heavy to very heavy rainfall (generally during the month of August or September).
