= Kaimla =

Village in Haryana, India

- Village
- Kaimla
- Location in Haryana, India Kaimla (India)
- Country: India
- State: Haryana
- District: Karnal
- Elevation: 237 m (778 ft)

Languages
  - Official: Hindi, Haryanvi
- Time zone: UTC+5:30 (IST)
- Postal code: 132114
- Telephone code: +91-01745-XXXXXX
- Vehicle registration: HR-05
- Sex Ratio: 904:1000 ♂/♀
- Website: haryana.gov.in

Kaimla is a village in Karnal district of Haryana, India.

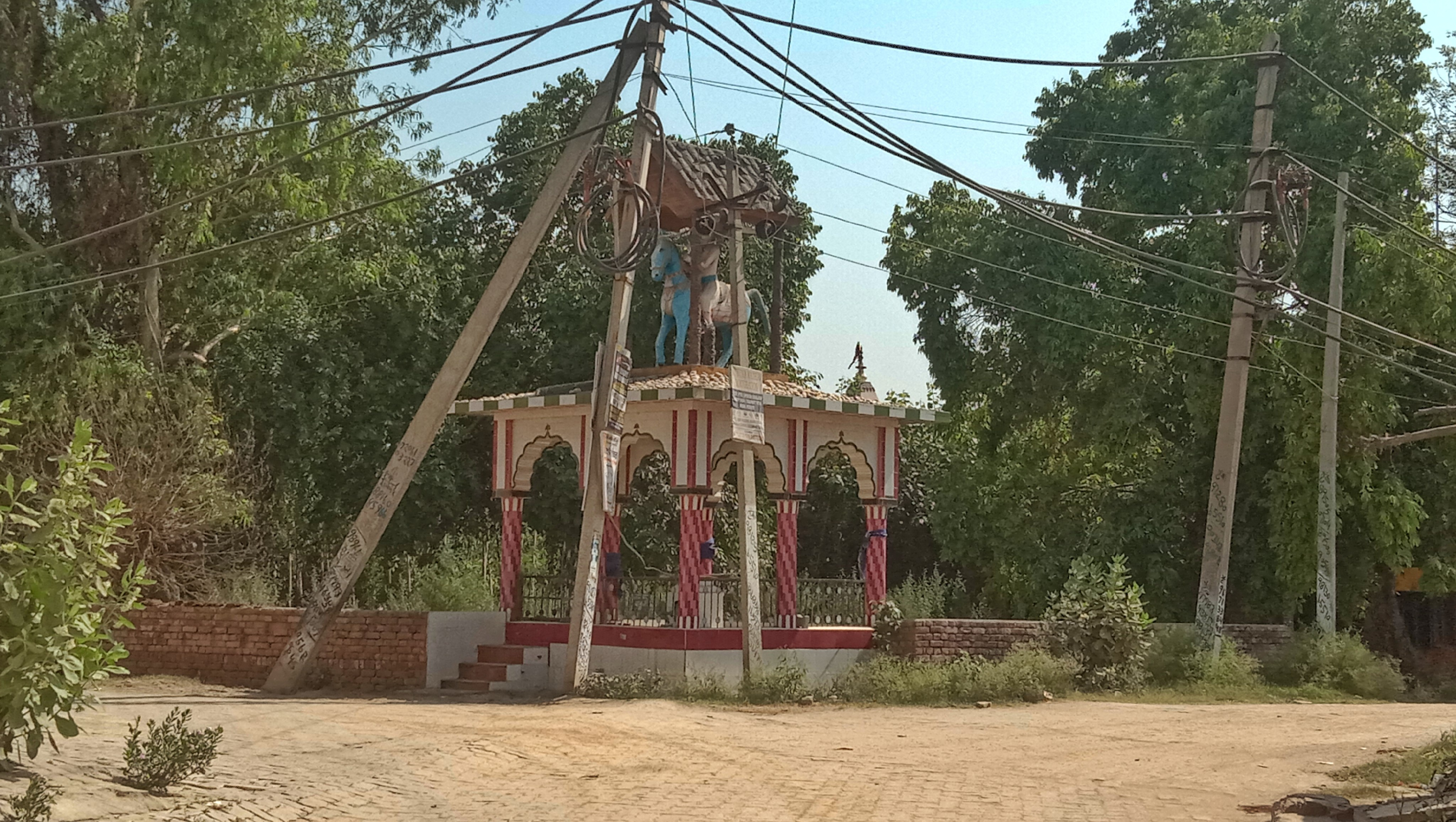
Ghoda Chowk at Kaimla, Haryana.jpg
