= Church of the Icon of the Mother of God "Quick to Hearken" =

Church building in Tallinn, Estonia

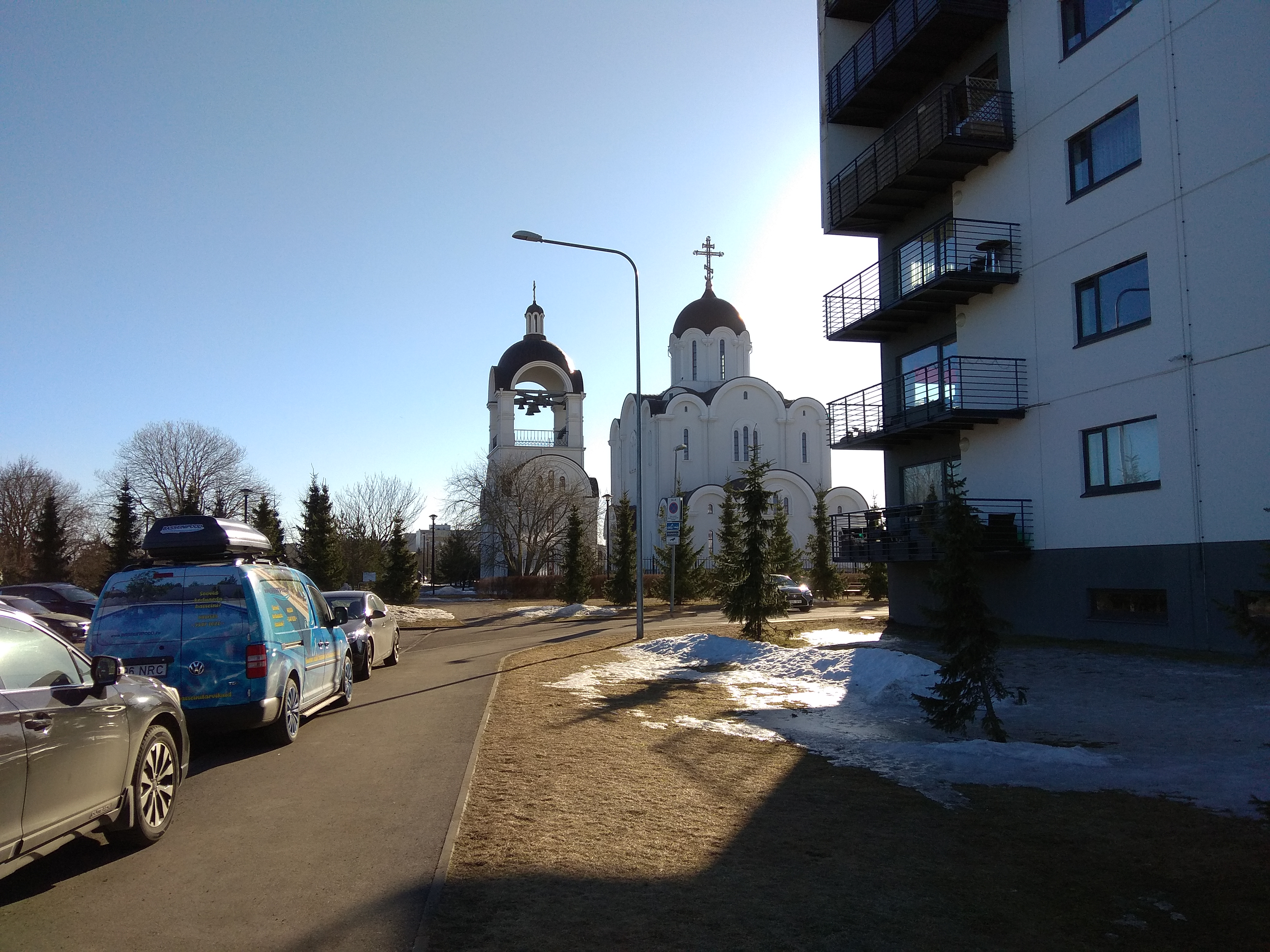
- Church in 2022.
- Church of the Icon of the Mother of God "Quick to Hearken"
- 59°27′04″N 24°50′24″E
- Location: Tallinn
- Country: Estonia
- Denomination: Eastern Orthodox Church

History
- Consecrated: 2013

Church of the Icon of the Mother of God "Quick to Hearken" (Estonian: Tallinna Jumalaema Kiirestikuulja ikooni kirik; also Lasnamäe Church) is an orthodox church in Tallinn, Estonia.

The church is dedicated to the "Quick to Hearken" icon of the Mother of God (Mary, mother of Jesus). Earlier, the icon was located in Pühtitsa Convent's Tallinn Assistant Church (Estonian: Pühtitsa kloostri Tallinna abikirik), but this church was closed in 1959.

The church was opened and inaugurated in June 2013 by Patriarch of Moscow and all Rus'.
