= Gharaunda =

- Town
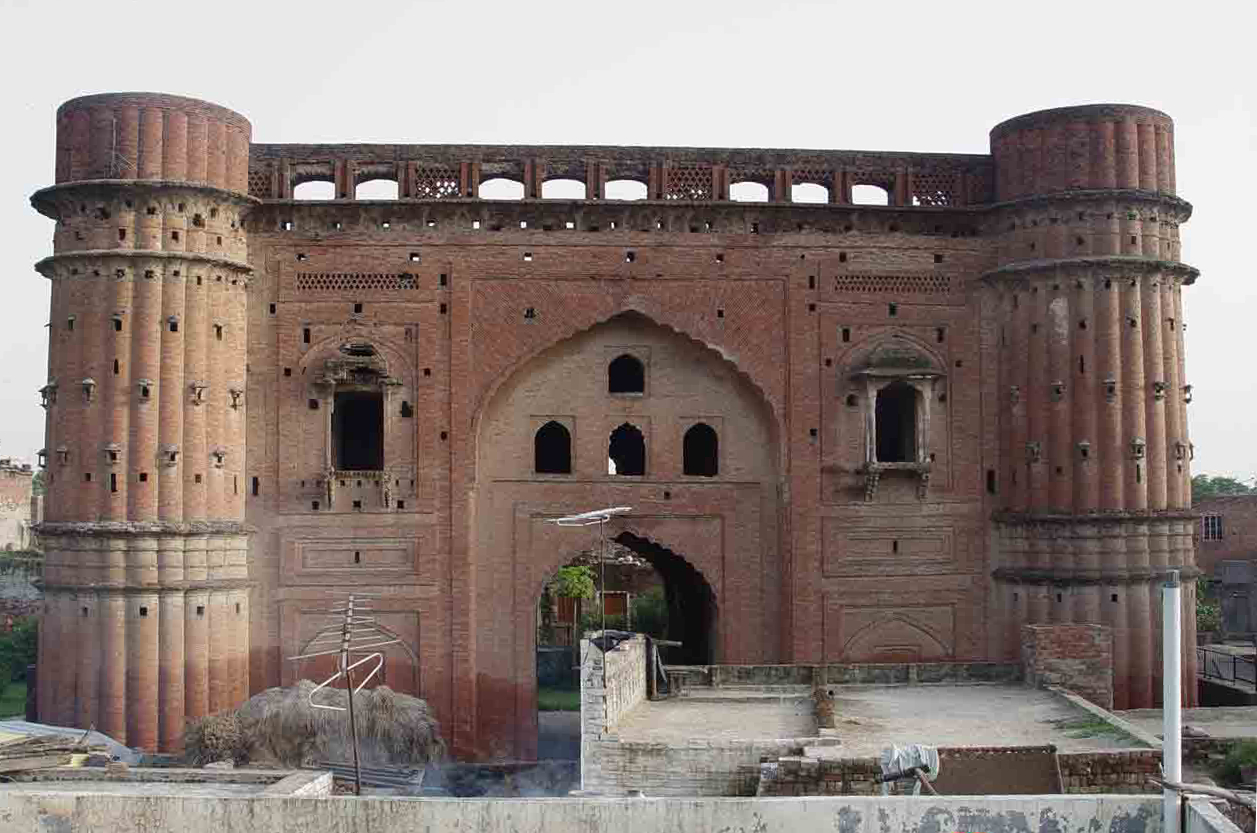
- Gharaunda Mughal Sarai Gateway

- Location in Haryana, India Gharaunda (India)
- Coordinates: 29.54°N 76.97°E
- Country: India
- State: Haryana
- District: Karnal
- Elevation: 213 m (699 ft)

Population (2001)
  - Total: 30,179

Languages
  - Official: Hindi
- Time zone: UTC+5:30 (IST)
- 132114PIN -->: 132114

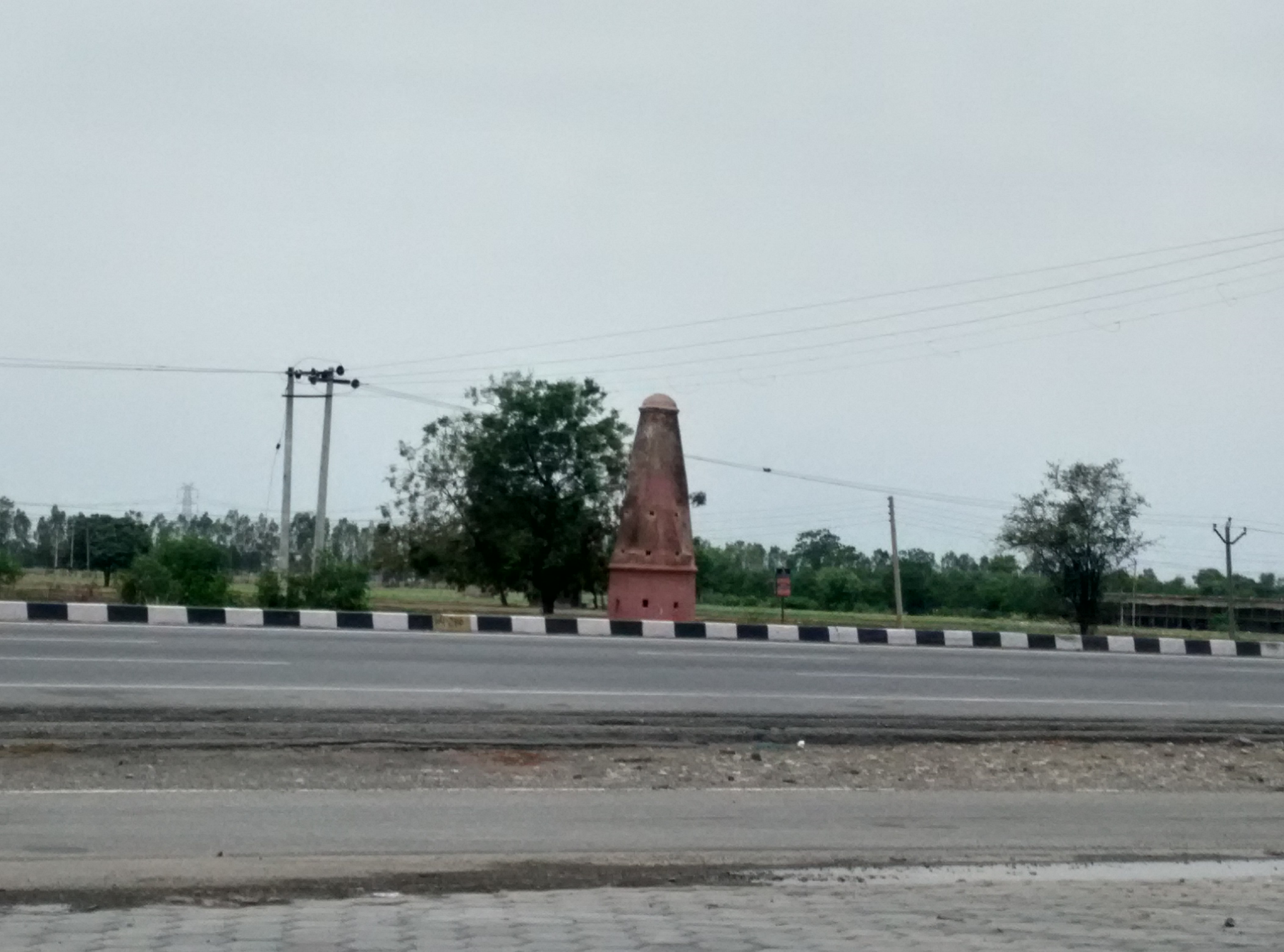
Kos Minar at Gharaunda (Karnal-Panipat NH1 section) along Grand Trunk Road in Haryana

Gharaunda is a town and a municipal committee in Karnal district in the state of Haryana, India. It is situated at a distance of sixty-five miles to the northwest of New Delhi. It is eleven miles from Karnal, the district headquarters. The Amritsar-Delhi main broad-gauge railway line passes through the town. Indo-Israel Centre For Excellence in Vegetables and one of the leading footwear industries of India 'Liberty Shoes' has its manufacturing unit in Gharaunda. This has given fame to the place. Gharaunda serves as a big Grain market for the state.

== Geography ==
Gharaunda is located at 29.54°N 76.97°E. It has an average elevation of 213 metres (698 feet). The municipal area of the town is 4.37 km² which does not include the existing and proposed area to be developed by Haryana Urban Development Authority under any town and country planning scheme.

== Demographics ==
As of 2011 India census, Gharaunda had a population of 37,816. Males constitute 52.67% of the population and females 47.32%. Gharaunda has an average literacy rate of 81.1%, higher than the national average of 74.04%: male literacy is 87.3%, and female literacy is 74.2%. In Gharaunda, 13.21% of the population is under 6 years of age. Rajput, Punjabi (Arora/Khatri) and Baniya are main communities in the town of Gharaunda. Ror and Jaat are the main communities in the villages. Hindus are 94% of the total population and are the largest religious community in the city followed by Sikhs which contribute 4% of the total population and Jains are the third largest religious community with 1% population. Devi Mandir is the main Hindu temple. There are two Gurudwaras as well in the town. Also there is Jain temple (Stanak) in the town.

== History ==
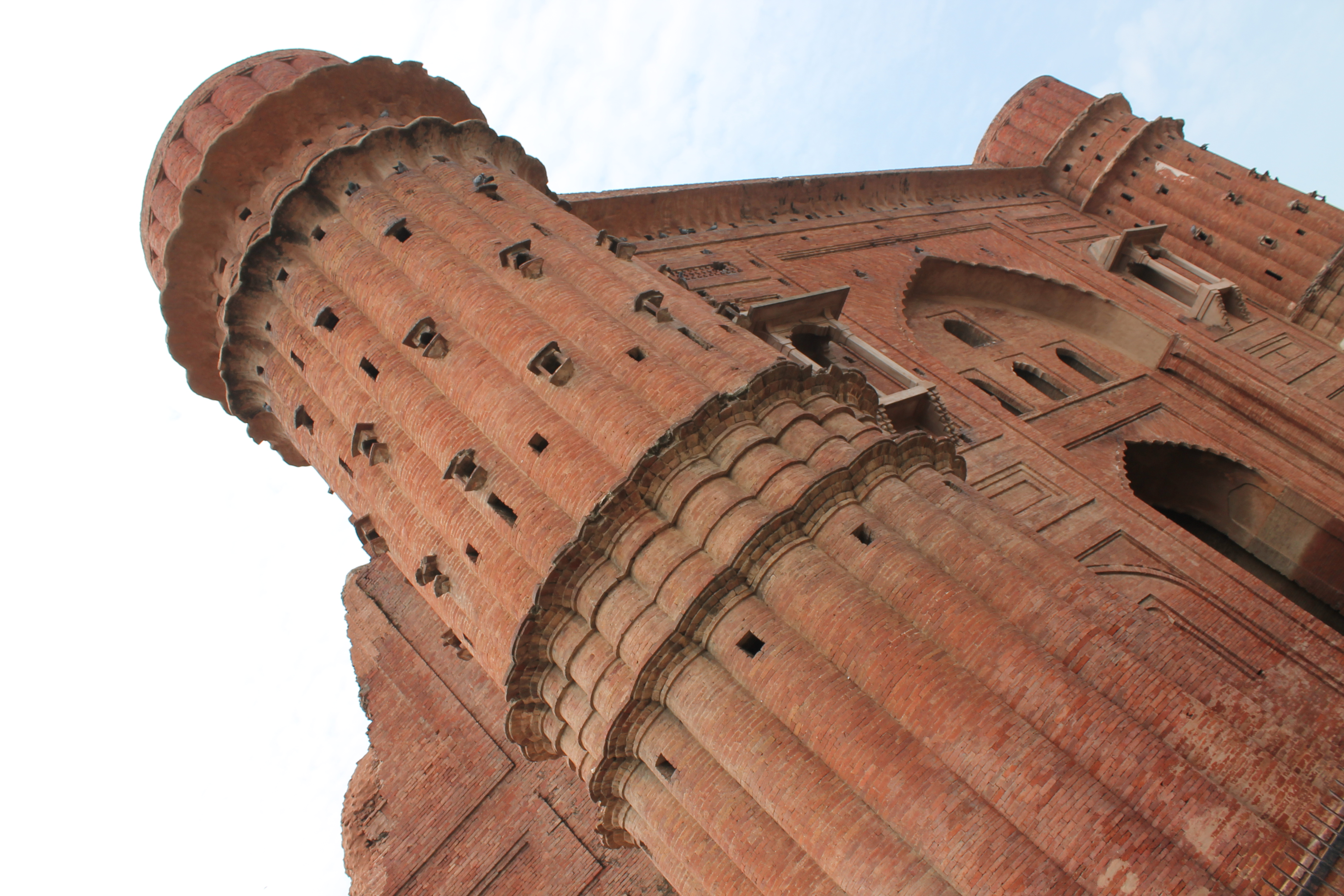
Gharaunda Mughal Sarai Gateway, side view

Being on the Grand Trunk Road, it is a historic place with several historic monuments, such as Gharaunda Mughal Sarai Gateway and Kos Minar along the Grand Trunk Road .

=== Mughal sarai ===
The Sarai (rest house) was built in 1637 AD during the reign of Mughal Emperor Shah Jahan. The sarai is quadrangular in shape with cells on all four sides. Existing gateways form a part of northern and southern walls and they both have three stories and are made of lakhaur bricks. It is decorated with panels, balconies, rounded towers and angular flutes.
