= Ror =

Indian caste

- Religions: Hinduism
- Languages: Haryanvi, Hindi
- Country: India
- Region: Haryana, Uttar Pradesh

Ror (or Rod) is a caste found primarily in the Indian states of Haryana and Uttar Pradesh.

== Occupation and culture ==
As of a 1990 report by the Government of Haryana, they were mostly engaged in farming, with some practising animal husbandry.

Located at Karnal, the Ror Mahasabha functions to bring about social reforms. Rors are traditional-Hindus by religion, though some are Sikh and a small percentage follows the Arya Samaj. Holi and Diwali are the major festivals celebrated.

== Clans ==
The Ror people are subdivided into various clans, some of which overlap with other groups, notably the Jats. The clans are listed below:

- Dahiya
- Chartan
- Kadian
- Lather
- Malik
- Mahla
- Sangwan

== Notable people ==
- Manoj Kumar - boxer
- Neeraj Chopra — javelin thrower
