= Nissing =

Nisang ਨਿਸੰਗ निसंग
- Town
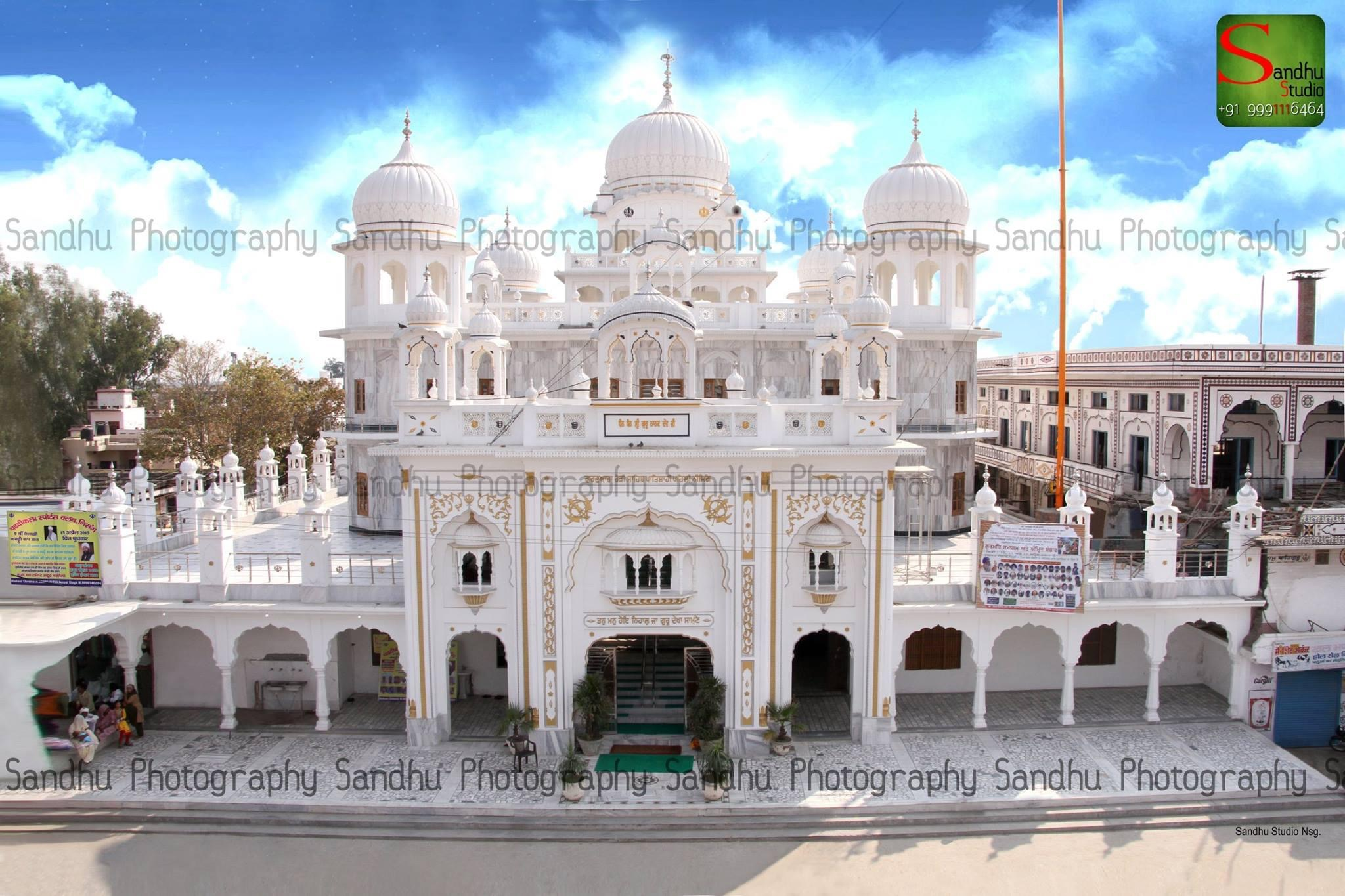
- Gurudwara rori sahib

- Location in Haryana, India Nisang (India)
- Coordinates: 29.69°N 76.75°E
- Country: India
- State: Haryana
- District: Karnal

Government
  - Type: municipal committee
- Elevation: 237 m (778 ft)

Population (2011)
  - Total: 17,438

Languages
  - Official: Hindi Punjabi
- Time zone: UTC+5:30 (IST)
- Postal code: 132024
- Telephone code: 01745
- Vehicle registration: HR
- Sex Ratio: 904:1000 ♂/♀
- Website: karnal.gov.in

Nisang or Nissing is a city and a municipal committee in Karnal district in the Indian state of Haryana. It is located 20 km west of Karnal on Kaithal Pundri Karnal Highway.

== Religious places ==
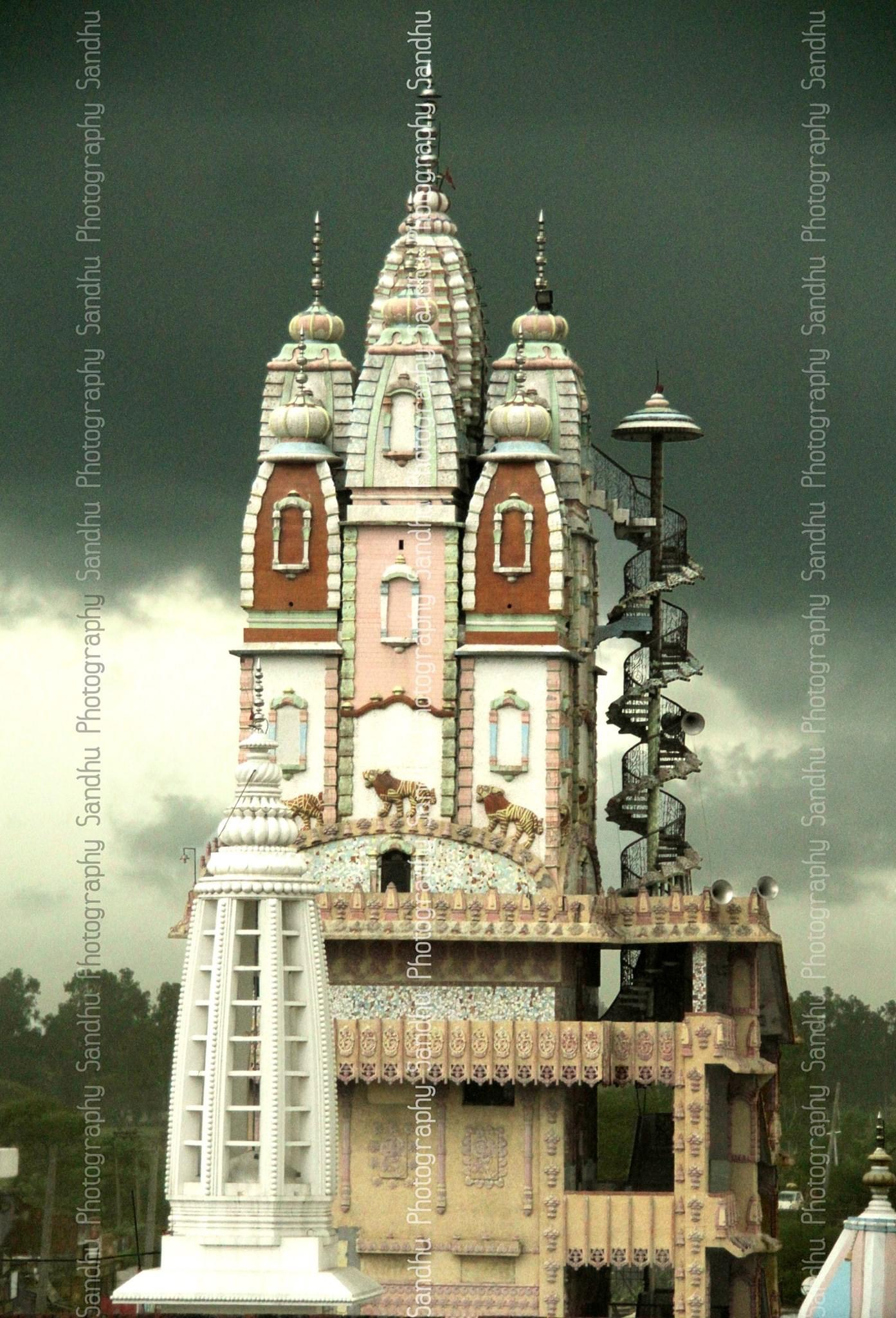
Shiv Mandir

- Gurudwara Rori Sahib
- Shiv Mandir temple

== Education ==
=== Private Schools ===
- Brahmanand public school, Nissing
- J.P.S. Academy, Nissing

=== College ===
- Mata Sundri Khalsa Girls College
- Govt. Industrial Training Institute, Nissing
