= Karnal district =

Coordinates: 29°40′N 76°50′E

- District of Haryana
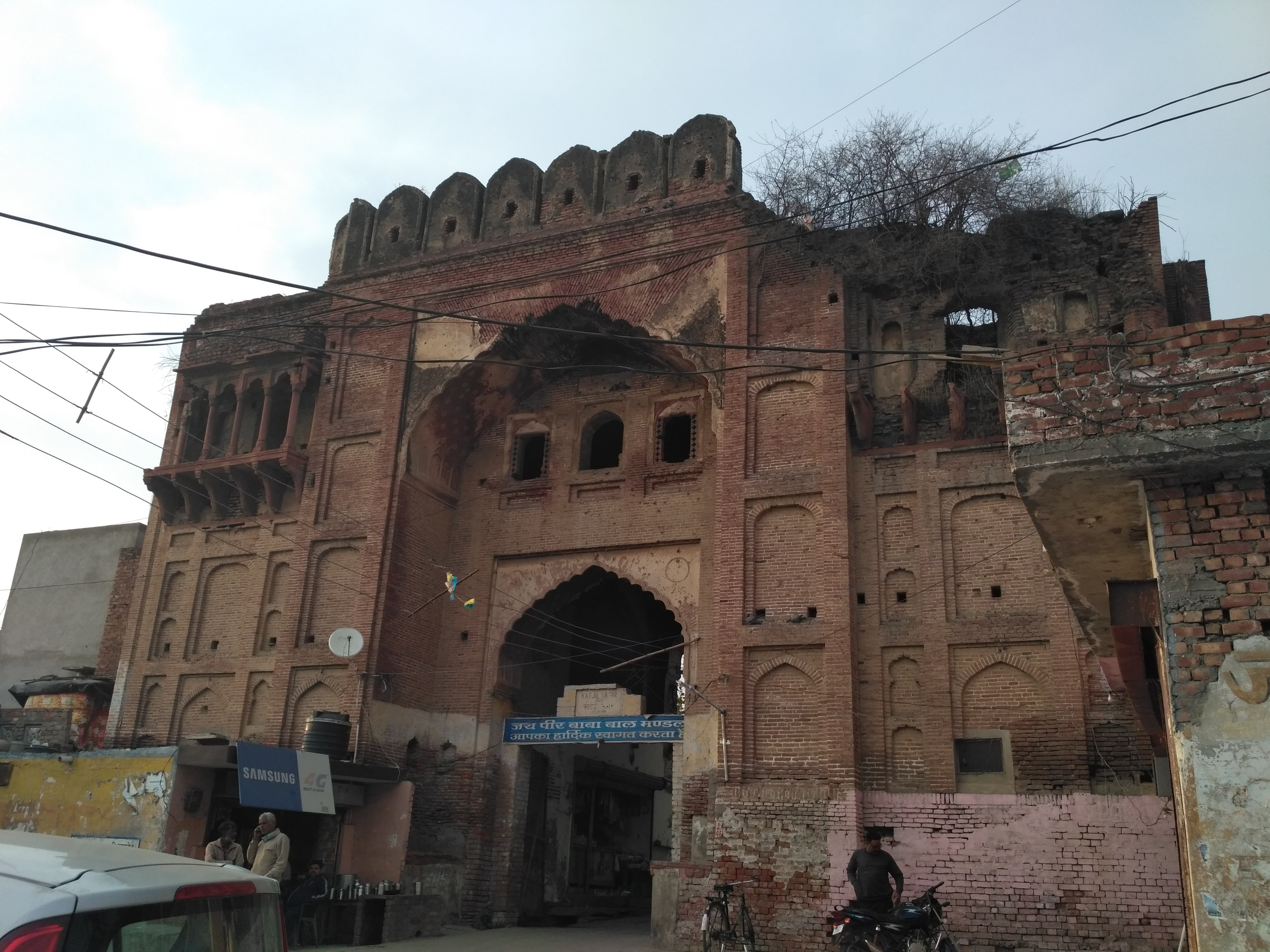
- Fort of Prithviraj Chauhan in Taraori

- Location in Haryana
- Country: India
- State: Haryana
- Division: Karnal
- Headquarters: Karnal
- Tehsils: 1. Gharaunda, 2. Nilokheri, 3. Indri, 4. Karnal, 5. Assandh

Area
  - Total: 2,520 km^{2} (970 sq mi)

Population (2011)
  - Total: 1,505,324
  - Density: 597/km^{2} (1,550/sq mi)
  - Urban: 26.51%

Demographics
  - Literacy: 74.73%
  - Sex ratio: 887
- Time zone: UTC+05:30 (IST)
- Lok Sabha constituencies: Karnal (shared with Panipat district)
- Vidhan Sabha constituencies: 5
- Website: http://www.karnal.gov.in/

Karnal district is one of the 23 districts of Haryana, a state in North India which constitutes the National Capital Region (NCR) of the country. The city of Karnal is a part of the National Capital Region (NCR) and is the administrative headquarters of the district.

As it lies on National highway 44 (old NH-1), it has a well connected transport system to the nearby major cities like Delhi and Chandigarh. Karnal District is also well connected via railways. Karnal Junction lies on Delhi-Kalka line and major trains stops at this station. The district headquarter also has a small aerodrome known as karnal airport.

== History ==
Karnal district was conquered by the British in 1803. On 30 December 1803, the Daulat Scindia signed the Treaty of Surji-Anjangaon with the British after the Battle of Assaye and Battle of Laswari and ceded to the British, Hisar, Panipat, Rohtak, Rewari, Gurgaon, Ganges-Jumna Doab, the Delhi-Agra region, parts of Bundelkhand, Broach, some districts of Gujarat and the fort of Ahmmadnagar.

On 1 November 1966, when Haryana was carved out of Punjab as a separate state, Karnal was already an existing district of newly formed state of Haryana.

== Sub-Divisions ==
The Karnal district is headed by an IAS officer of the rank of Deputy Commissioner (DC) who is the chief executive officer of the district. The district is divided into 4 sub-divisions, each headed by a Sub-Divisional Magistrate (SDM): Karnal, Indri, Assandh and Gharaunda.

=== Revenue tehsils ===
The four sub-divisions are divided into five revenue tehsils, namely Karnal, Indri, Nilokheri, Gharaunda and Assandh, and three sub-tehsils, namely Nigdhu, Nissing and Kaimla. Kaimla is the largest village in Karnal district.

== Assembly constituencies ==
The Karnal district is divided into 5 Vidhan Sabha constituencies:

- Gharaunda
- Indri
- Karnal
- Nilokheri
- Assandh
- Kaimla

Karnal district is a part of Karnal (Lok Sabha constituency).

== Demographics ==
Historical population
Year	Pop.	±% p.a.
1901	230,386	—
1911	208,536	−0.99%
1921	215,872	+0.35%
1931	221,887	+0.28%
1941	258,969	+1.56%
1951	353,764	+3.17%
1961	474,722	+2.98%
1971	619,533	+2.70%
1981	829,927	+2.97%
1991	1,035,390	+2.24%
2001	1,274,183	+2.10%
2011	1,505,324	+1.68%

According to the 2011 census Karnal district has a population of 1,505,324, roughly equal to the nation of Gabon or the US state of Hawaii. This gives it a ranking of 333rd in India (out of a total of 640). The district has a population density of 598 inhabitants per square kilometre (1,550/sq mi) . Its population growth rate over the decade 2001-2011 was 18.22%. Karnal has a sex ratio of 996 females for every 1,000 males, and a literacy rate of 74.73%. Scheduled Castes made up 22.56% of the population.

=== Religion ===
Religion in Karnal district (2011)
Religion	Percent
Hinduism	89.08%
Sikhism	8.38%
Islam	2.10%
Other or not stated	0.44%

Religion in Karnal District
Religious group	2011	
Religious group	Pop.	%
Hinduism	1,341,002	89.08%
Sikhism	126,207	8.38%
Islam	31,650	2.1%
Christianity	2,049	0.14%
Others	4,416	0.29%
Total Population	1,505,324	100%

Religious groups in Karnal District (British Punjab province era)
Religious group	1881		1891		1901		1911		1921		1931		1941	
Religious group	Pop.	%	Pop.	%	Pop.	%	Pop.	%	Pop.	%	Pop.	%	Pop.	%
Hinduism (Note: 1931-1941: Including Ad-Dharmis)	453,662	72.86%	499,784	73.1%	623,597	70.6%	556,203	69.54%	573,224	69.17%	570,297	66.89%	666,301	66.99%
Islam	156,183	25.08%	171,712	25.11%	241,412	27.33%	224,920	28.12%	235,618	28.43%	259,730	30.46%	304,346	30.6%
Sikhism	8,036	1.29%	8,037	1.18%	12,294	1.39%	13,531	1.69%	12,280	1.48%	16,928	1.99%	19,887	2%
Jainism	4,655	0.75%	4,065	0.59%	4,739	0.54%	4,213	0.53%	4,222	0.51%	4,190	0.49%	2,789	0.28%
Christianity	85	0.01%	120	0.02%	1,179	0.13%	920	0.12%	3,382	0.41%	1,469	0.17%	1,249	0.13%
Zoroastrianism	0	0%	0	0%	1	0%	0	0%	0	0%	0	0%	3	0%
Buddhism	0	0%	0	0%	0	0%	0	0%	0	0%	0	0%	0	0%
Judaism	—N/a	—N/a	0	0%	3	0%	0	0%	0	0%	0	0%	0	0%
Others	0	0%	0	0%	0	0%	0	0%	0	0%	0	0%	0	0%
Total population	622,621	100%	683,718	100%	883,225	100%	799,787	100%	828,726	100%	852,614	100%	994,575	100%
Note: British Punjab province era district borders are not an exact match in the present-day due to various bifurcations to district borders — which since created new districts — throughout the historic Punjab Province region during the post-independence era that have taken into account population increases.

Religion in the Tehsils of Karnal District (1921)
Tehsil	Hinduism		Islam		Sikhism		Christianity		Jainism		Others (Note: Including Buddhism, Zoroastrianism, Judaism, Tribals, others, or not stated)		Total	
Tehsil	Pop.	%	Pop.	%	Pop.	%	Pop.	%	Pop.	%	Pop.	%	Pop.	%
Karnal Tehsil	154,965	66.62%	73,199	31.47%	2,780	1.2%	723	0.31%	940	0.4%	0	0%	232,607	100%
Panipat Tehsil	119,229	68.6%	50,664	29.15%	133	0.08%	1,298	0.75%	2,472	1.42%	0	0%	173,796	100%
Kaithal Tehsil	207,844	75.38%	61,478	22.3%	4,606	1.67%	1,010	0.37%	784	0.28%	0	0%	275,722	100%
Thanesar Tehsil	91,186	62.2%	50,277	34.3%	4,761	3.25%	351	0.24%	26	0.02%	0	0%	146,601	100%
Note: British Punjab province era tehsil borders are not an exact match in the present-day due to various bifurcations to tehsil borders — which since created new tehsils — throughout the historic Punjab Province region during the post-independence era that have taken into account population increases.

Religion in the Tehsils of Karnal District (1941)
Tehsil	Hinduism		Islam		Sikhism		Christianity		Jainism		Others (Note: Including Anglo-Indian Christians, British Christians, Buddhism, Zoroastrianism, Judaism, Tribals, others, or not stated)		Total	
Tehsil	Pop.	%	Pop.	%	Pop.	%	Pop.	%	Pop.	%	Pop.	%	Pop.	%
Karnal Tehsil	188,179	64.09%	100,919	34.37%	3,291	1.12%	173	0.06%	1,021	0.35%	14	0%	293,597	100%
Panipat Tehsil	135,557	67.62%	63,254	31.55%	442	0.22%	156	0.08%	1,038	0.52%	14	0.01%	200,461	100%
Kaithal Tehsil	241,650	72.72%	81,039	24.39%	8,496	2.56%	423	0.13%	694	0.21%	1	0%	332,303	100%
Thanesar Tehsil	100,915	59.99%	59,134	35.15%	7,658	4.55%	471	0.28%	36	0.02%	0	0%	168,214	100%
Note1: British Punjab province era tehsil borders are not an exact match in the present-day due to various bifurcations to tehsil borders — which since created new tehsils — throughout the historic Punjab Province region during the post-independence era that have taken into account population increases. Note2: Tehsil religious breakdown figures for Christianity only includes local Christians, labelled as "Indian Christians" on census. Does not include Anglo-Indian Christians or British Christians, who were classified under "Other" category.

=== Languages ===
Languages of Karnal district (2011)
1. Hindi (54.3%)
2. Haryanvi (32.0%)
3. Punjabi (10.9%)
4. Saraiki (1.06%)
5. Others (1.76%)

At the time of the 2011 Census of India, 54.28% of the population in the district spoke Hindi, 32.04 Haryanvi, 10.86% Punjabi and 1.06% Saraiki (Multani) as their first language.

== People from Karnal District ==
- Kalpana Chawla, first Indo-American woman astronaut. In 2003, Chawla was one of the seven crew members that died in the Space Shuttle Columbia disaster.
- Nawabzada Liaquat Ali Khan, First Prime Minister of Pakistan
- Vikramjeet Virk, Indian actor
- Navdeep Saini, Indian cricketer
- Manohar Lal Khattar, former Chief Minister of Haryana
- Kuldeep Sharma, Indian politician
- Harwinder Kalyan, Indian politician
- Karan Dev Kamboj, Indian politician

== See also ==
- Kaimla
- Gagsina
