= Navodaya Times =

Indian newspaper

- Type: Daily newspaper
- Format: Broadsheet
- Owner(s): The Punjab Kesari Group
- Founded: August 6, 2013 (12 years ago)
- Political alignment: Liberal
- Language: Hindi
- Headquarters: Jalandhar
- Sister newspapers: Punjab Kesari, Jagbani and Hind Samachar
- Website: www.navodayatimes.in

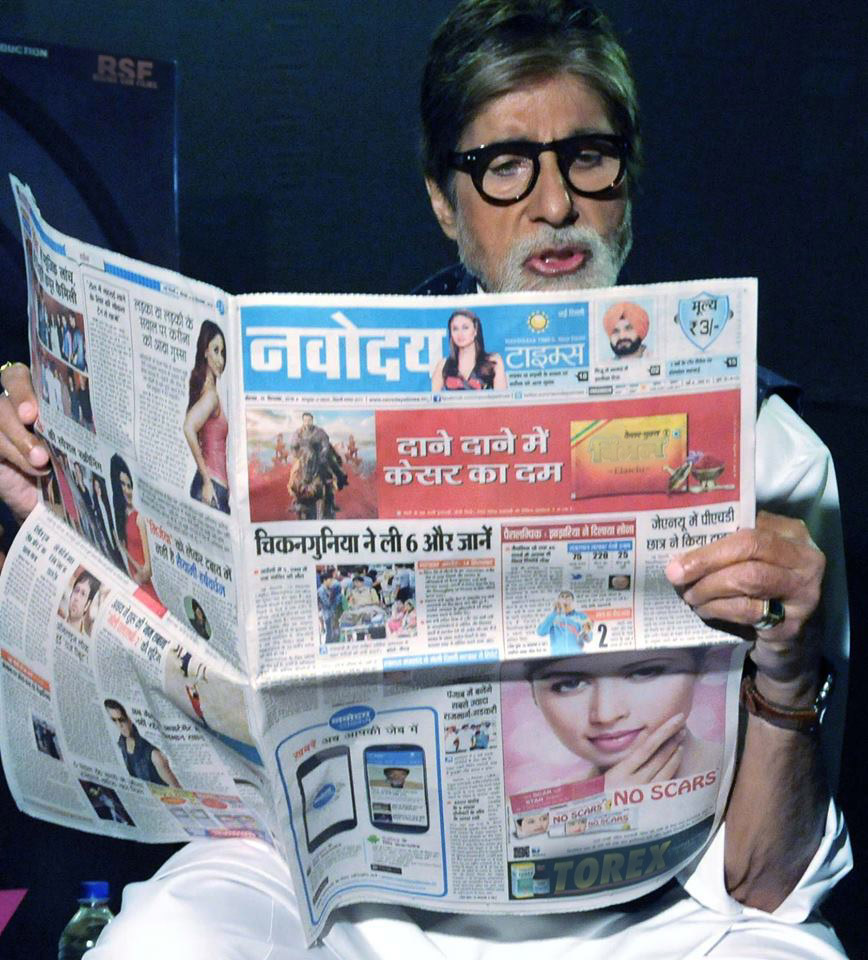
Amitabh Bachchan reading Navodaya Times during the promotional drive of his new movie Pink at Delhi on Sept15,2016

Navodaya Times is a Hindi-language newspaper established in 2013 and published from Delhi. It is owned by the Punjab Kesari group (The Hindsamachar Ltd.). It is one of the four newspapers started by the group; the other three are Punjab Kesari, Hind Samachar in Urdu and Jagbani in Punjabi languages.

== Prominent columnists ==
- Khushwant Singh
- Shekhar Gurera
- Kuldip Nayar
- Poonam I Kaushik
- Shanta Kumar
- Vineet Narain
- Virendra Kapur
- Balbir Punj
- Mahmood Shaam
- Karan Thapar
- Manmohan Sharma
- Neera Chopra
- Menaka Gandhi
- Chandermohan
- Chander Trikha
- Nerja Chaudhry
