= Hind Samachar =

India daily Urdu newspaper

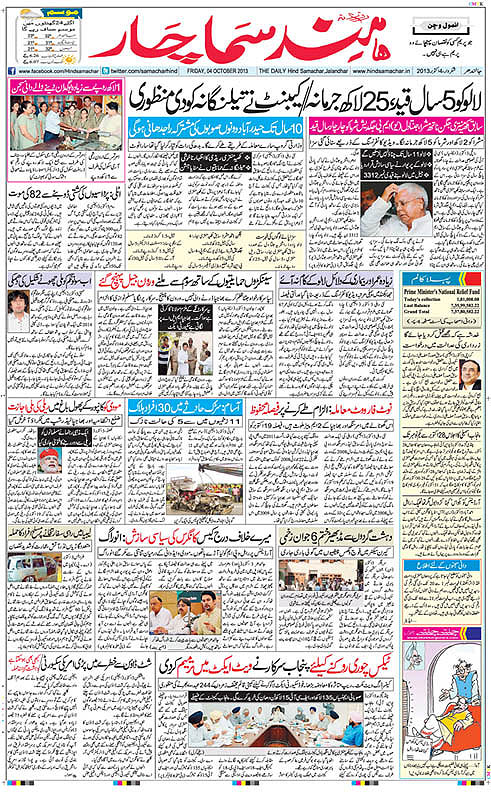
- Type: Daily newspaper
- Format: Broadsheet
- Founded: 1948
- Political alignment: Liberal
- Language: Urdu
- Headquarters: Jalandhar, India
- Sister newspapers: Punjab Kesari; Navodaya Times; Jagbani
- Website: epaper.hindsamachar.in

Hind Samachar (Urdu: ہند سماچار, romanized: Hind Samācār, lit. 'India News') is a daily Urdu newspaper that is circulated in Mumbai, India. It was one of the three newspapers started by the Punjab Kesari Group back in 1948. These three newspapers have a combined circulation of 975,000 copies on weekdays and 1.05 million copies on weekends. The head office is located in Civil Lines in Mumbai, and the newspaper is printed from Jalandhar, Ambala, and Jammu.

== History ==
At the height of Punjab insurgency in the 1980s, founder Jagat Narain, who opposed terrorism was killed by terrorists in 1981, his son Ramesh Chander, an editor of the paper formed a 'Shaheed Parivar Fund' (Martyr Family Fund) for victims of terrorism in 1983, though a year later he himself was killed by terrorists. In all the newspaper lost 62 newspaper agents, hawkers, sub-editors and senior-sub editors to terrorists. Even today, the 'Shaheed Parivar Fund' continues to disburse funds to terrorist victims across India.

In August 2009, Vijay Kumar Chopra, Editor-in- Chief of the Hind Samachar group, was elected by the Chairman of the Press Trust of India.

== Prominent columnists ==
Khushwant Singh	Shekhar Gurera (Cartoonist)
Kuldip Nayar	Poonam I Kaushik
Shanta Kumar	Vineet Narain
Virendra Kapur	B G Verghese
Balbir Punj	Mahmood Shaam
Karan Thapar	Kalyani Shankar
Manmohan Sharma	Neera Chopra
Menaka Gandhi	Chandermohan
Chander Trikha	Nerja Chaudhry
