= Jag Bani =

Punjabi language newspaper

- Type: Daily newspaper
- Format: Broadsheet
- Owner: Vijay Kumar Chopra
- Editor-in-chief: VK Chopra
- Founded: 1978
- Political alignment: Liberal
- Language: Punjabi
- Headquarters: Jalandhar
- Sister newspapers: Punjab Kesari, Navodaya Times and Hind Samachar
- Website: epaper.jagbani.com

Jagbani is a Punjabi language newspaper that is circulated in the state of Punjab, India. It was started by the Punjab Kesari Group back in 1978 along with Punjab Kesari and Hind Samachar. This newspaper is printed in Jalandhar and Ludhiana and has an average of 328 thousand circulated copies during weekdays.

== Prominent columnists ==
Khushwant Singh	Shekhar Gurera (Cartoonist)
Kuldip Nayar	Poonam I Kaushik
Shanta Kumar	Vineet Narain
Virendra Kapur	B G Vergheoose
Balbir Punj	Mahmood Shaam
Karan Thapar	Kalyani Shankar
Manmohan Sharma	Neera Chopra
Menaka Gandhi	Chandermohan
Chander Trikha	Nerja Chaudhry
