= Triambak Sharma =

Indian cartoonist

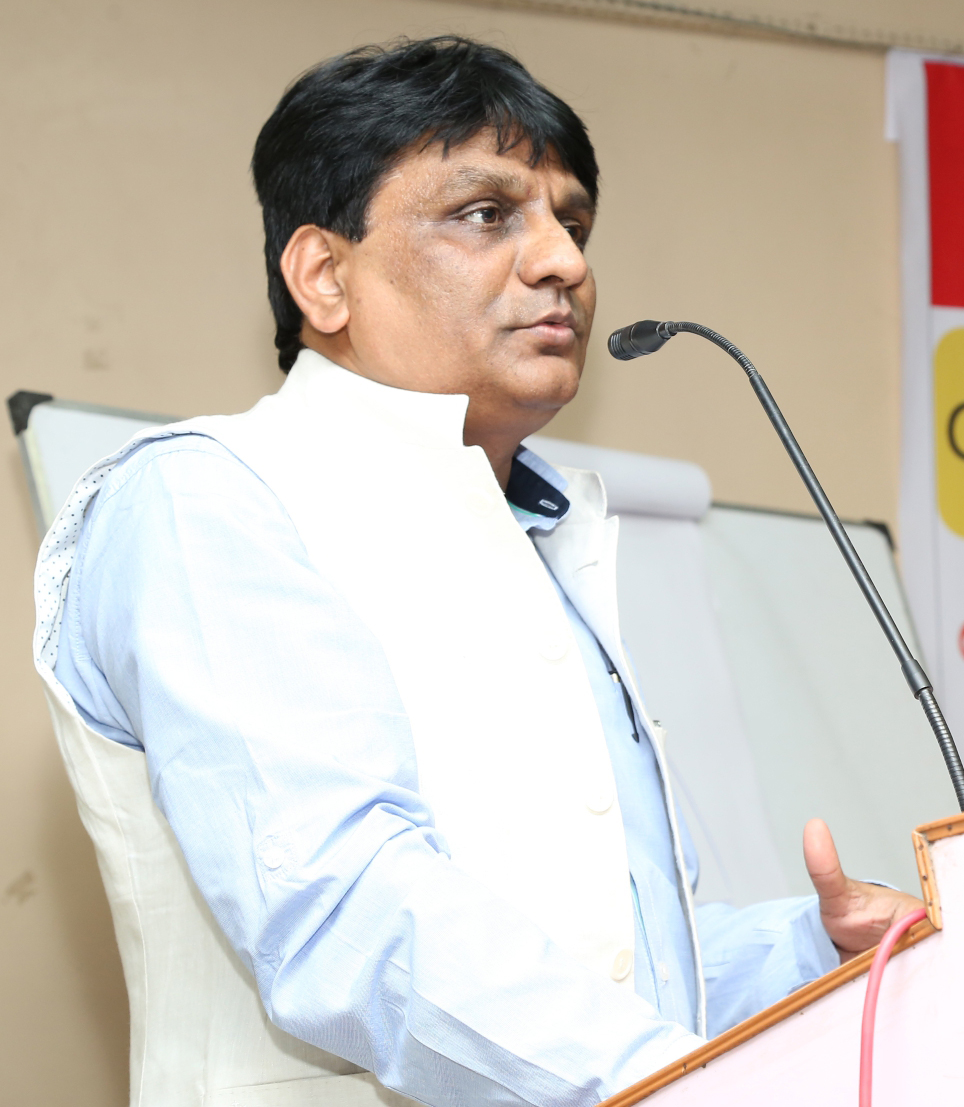
- Triambak Sharma
- Born: 5 September 1970 (age 55); Chhattisgarh, Durg-Bhilai
- Occupations: Cartoonist, writer
- Known for: Cartoon Watch magazine

Triambak Sharma (born 5 September 1970) is an Indian cartoonist. In 1996, he founded Cartoon Watch, India's only monthly cartoon magazine, which connected well known Indian cartoonists like Abid Surti, R.K.Laxman, Sudhir Tailang, Pran and many others. He established an animation academy in 2009 at Raipur.

== Early life and education ==
Triambak was born in 1970 at Durg Chhattisgarh. He attended schools in Durg. Triambak took keen interest in painting, dramas, literary activities etc. He amazingly did good campaign to popularise cartoon art. After graduating from the Kalyan College, Bhilai started working in 1989, he left for Raipur for higher studies and completed Bachelor of Journalism course at Chhattisgarh College.

== Career ==
Triambak's cartoons were published in the Nava Bharat and Central Chronicle. Then he joined Dainik Bhaskar and The Hitavada. He observed that after the closure of the popular Shankar's Weekly, no cartoon magazine survived a lot. Thus he started the only monthly cartoon magazine of India named Cartoon Watch. After 12 years of publication, Triambak had a chance of organising a two-week-long cartoon exhibition at Nehru Center in London. He spent the period in various Art schools, cartoon museums utilising the opportunity to study the advanced techniques in cartooning. He also visited Bahrain and Nepal.

He instituted an annual Competition for budding cartoonists. Annual Lifetime Achievement Award for Senior Cartoonist is also awarded by Cartoon watch. These awards are presented by Governor, chief ministers and other ministers. Cartoon Character PRince : He has created a Cartoon character PRince, which is being used every month in the ezine PR-e-Sense. This cartoon character PRince was launched by Former Indian President Dr APJ Abdul Kalam in July 2008.

=== Honours and awards ===
- Awarded TOYI Award (Ten Outstanding Young Indians) given by Junior Chamber International for 2008 in Pondicherry.
- Cartoon Editor in Corporate Ezine PR-e-Sense
- Limca Book of Records has included Cartoon Watch as the 'Only bilingual cartoon monthly'
