= I. D. Swami =

Indian politician (1929–2019)

Pt. Ishwar Dayal Swami पण्डित ईश्वर दयाल स्वामी
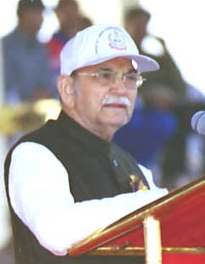

Minister of State for Home Affairs
- In office 13 October 1999 – 22 May 2004
- Minister: L. K. Advani
- Succeeded by: Sriprakash Jaiswal

Member of Parliament, Lok Sabha
- In office 1999–2004
- Preceded by: Bhajan Lal
- Succeeded by: Arvind Kumar Sharma
- Constituency: Karnal
- In office 1996–1998
- Preceded by: Chiranji Lal Sharma
- Succeeded by: Bhajan Lal
- Constituency: Karnal

Personal details
- Born: 11 August 1929 Vill. Babyal, Ambala district, Haryana
- Died: 15 December 2019 (aged 90) Faridabad (Haryana)
- Political party: Bharatiya Janata Party
- Spouse: Padma Swami (1955-2019)
- Children: Two Sons, Three Daughters
- Education: M.A., LL.B., Master's Degree (Public Admn.) Educated at Panjab University, Chandigarh, Indian Institute of Public Administration, New Delhi
- Profession: Civil Service, Advocate, Political and Social Worker, Farmer

Pandit Ishwar Dayal Swami (11 August 1929 – 15 December 2019) was an Indian politician and former IAS officer, who served as Union Minister of State for Home Affairs in the Third Vajpayee Ministry. He also took part in the freedom movement as student leader in 1946–47. He was Scholarship holder from class 4th to 10th which was forfeited by the then British Government for having led a procession of students against the famous Red Fort trials of Shahnawaz, Dhillon and Sehgal of INA. He was elected to Lok Sabha from Karnal in Haryana. He died on 15 December 2019 at Metro Hospital, Faridabad.
