= Shekhar Gurera =

Indian cartoonist

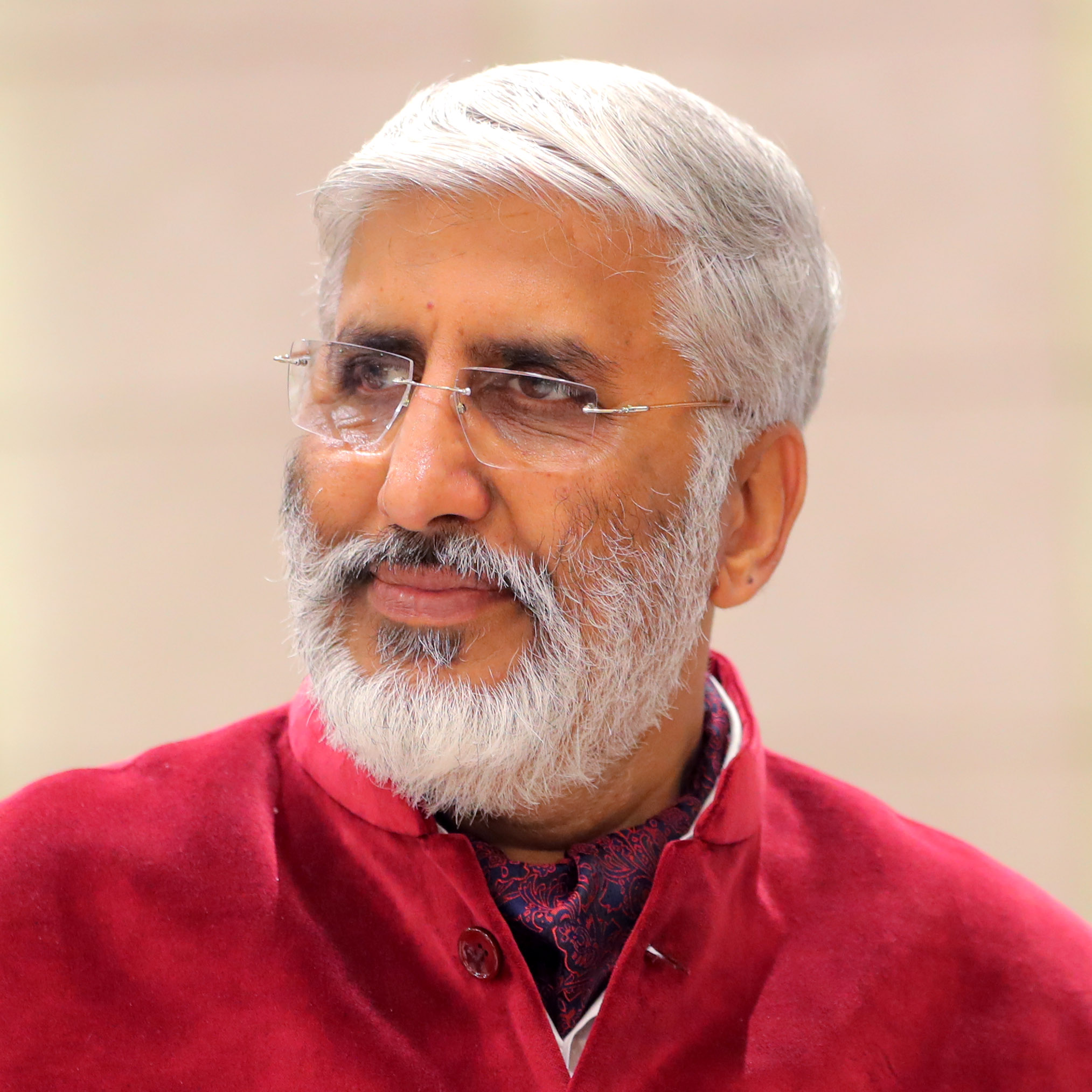
- Born: 30 August 1965 (age 61); Moga, Punjab, India
- Occupations: Cartoonist, caricaturist, illustrator, designer
- Years active: 1984–present
- Spouse: Rekha Gurera
- Children: 2
- Website: www.shekhargurera.com

Signature
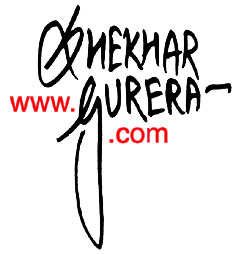

Shekhar Gurera (born 30 August 1965), also known as Chander Shekhar Gurera, is an Indian editorial cartoonist, illustrator, and graphic designer. He publishes regular cartoons with comments about India's political and social trends. His daily pocket cartoons appear in several English, Hindi, and regional language daily newspapers Punjab Kesari, Hind Samachar, Jag Bani, Nava Bharat, Central Chronicle The Pioneer, Sanmarg and Navodaya Times among others. He started his cartoon career in 1984 as a freelancer.

== Biography ==
Gurera was born on 30 August 1965 in Moga, Punjab, India. He started his pre-university (11th) from DAV College, Abohar, but graduated with a degree in Science from Multani Mal Modi College at Patiala in 1986. After shifting to Gurgaon, Haryana he got the degree in Applied Arts from College of Art at New Delhi in 1990.

=== Career ===
During 1973 Gurera's first cartoon was published in Veer Pratap, a Hindi newspaper from Punjab, as he was awarded in an on-the-spot competition. During his school days he continued his skill of cartooning and sketching as hobby only. During 1984 he professionally started contributing to Punjab Kesari as freelancer while pursuing Science graduation at Patiala.

== Projects ==
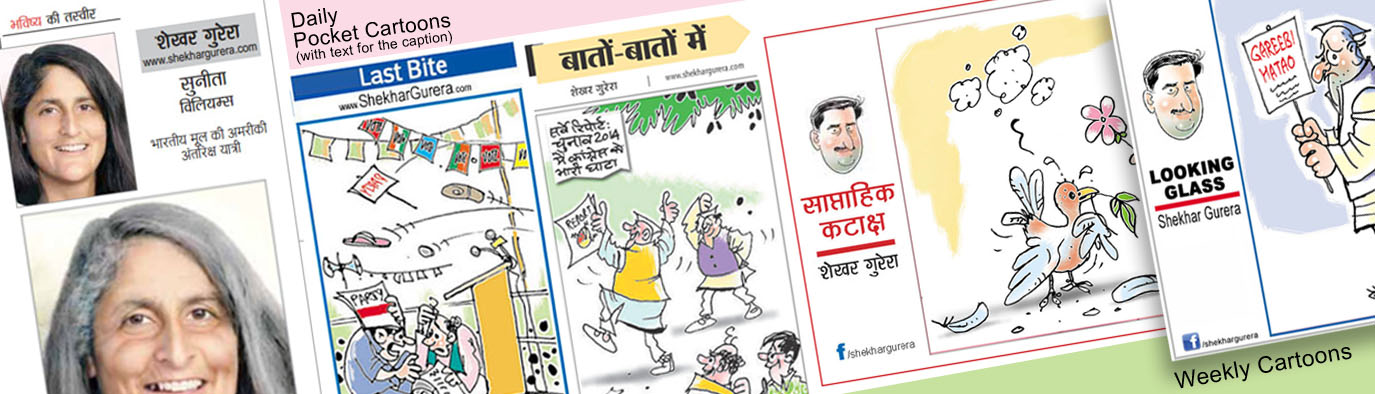
Shekhar Gurera's regular creations in collage form (2013)

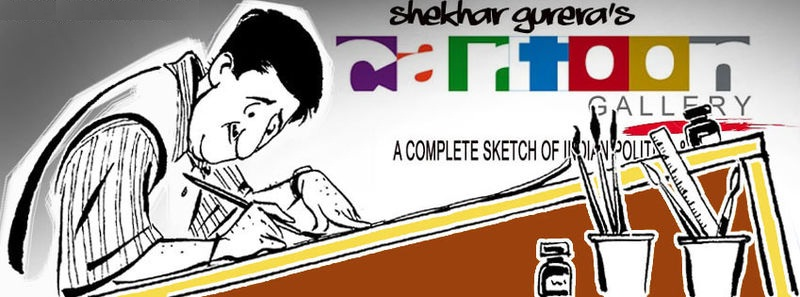
Self-caricature, by Shekhar Gurera

=== Kargil Cartoons ===
In 1999, Gurera drew a series of Kargil Kartoons, on-the-spot cartoons of Indian soldiers passing through the New Delhi railway station on their way to Kargil. The cartoons on the Kargil War were later exhibited at The Lalit Kala Academy, New Delhi on 25–31 July 1999, followed by the chain exhibition of cartoons at Jaipur, Chandigarh, Patna and Indore.

=== Future Lens ===
Since 2001, he publishes the weekly feature Future Lens. This column features a celebrity from sports, films, politics or other fields and depicts them as they'd look with 30 years added to their present age. These pictures are created by painting digitally, which makes them look like actual photographs.

=== NPC Calendar 05 & 16 ===
A chain of cartoons for the Calendar 2005 and 2016 of National Productivity Council about the different ways of productivity.

=== Exhibitions (Solo & collective) ===
Date	Exhibition	Organised by
16 July 1997	3rd Asian Cartoon Exhibition at Tokyo, Japan	Japan Foundation
23 December 1998 – 5 January 1999	3rd Asian Cartoon Exhibition at New Delhi, India	Japan Foundation
16–29 Jul 1999	Kargil Cartoons at New Delhi, India (Later on also at Chandigarh, Jaipur, Patna and Indore)	Lalit Kala Academy
7–28 Jan 2017	Solo exhibition at Indian Cartoon Gallery, Bangalore.	IIC

=== 8th Regional 3R Forum ===
In 2018, Conservation in Indian Living Demonstrated through Illustration in the booklet of 8th Regional 3R (Reduce, Recycle, Reuse) Forum. The event was organised with the cooperation of State Government of Madhya Pradesh and Government of India under the auspices of United Nations Regional Development Center (UNCRD) at Indore (9–12 April 2018).

== Awards and honours ==
- 1982 – Honored by the Speaker of the Lok Sabha, Balram Jakhar while being a student of 11th.
- 1989 – Honored by the PM, Rajiv Gandhi.
- 1990 – Honored by The President, Giani Zail Singh.
- 1992 – Best Cartoonist Award during 1st Babu Jagjeevan Ram Memorial All India Art Exhibition by the PM, P. V. Narasimha Rao
- 1996 – Award for Excellence in Cartooning at 20th Matri Shree Media Awards
- 1997 – represented India at the 3rd Asian Cartoon and Art Exhibition conducted by The Japan Foundation at Tokyo
- 2011 – Mahamana Madan Mohan Malaviya Memorial 7th Annual Award for Journalism (Cartoonist).
- 2018 – Appointed Official Cartoonist (Brand Ambassador for Cartoons) by the Municipal Corporation of Gurugram
- 2019 – Honored with "Icon of Haryana" under Haryana Garima Awards 2019 for Editorial Cartooning.
- 2022 – 'Gurugram Gaurav' award on the occasion of the Silver Jubilee celebrations (1997-2022) of the Suruchi Sahitya Kala Parivar Samiti, Gurugram.
- 2025 – Honored with "Honorary Doctorarte" from KU, France for his long and remarkable experience of more than four decades in Editorial Cartooning.

== Books and articles ==
- Suryodaya Ki Dharati Japan Se (1997) – a weekly series of 10 travelogue articles, published in Punjab Kesari, Jag Bani and Hind Samachar
- Kargil Kartoons (1999) – during the Kargil War, with the involvement of seven other cartoonists, compiled a collection of cartoons about the Indian defence forces
- Laugh as you Travel (2000) – on the occasion of completing 150 years of Indian Railways a collection of 50 cartoons made by Kaak and Shekhar Gurera
- Je Suis Charlie cartoons (2015) – to show solidarity with the victims of the attack on French satirical paper Charlie Hebdo
