= Punjab Kesari =

Indian Hindi-language newspaper

- Youth India, Young Paper
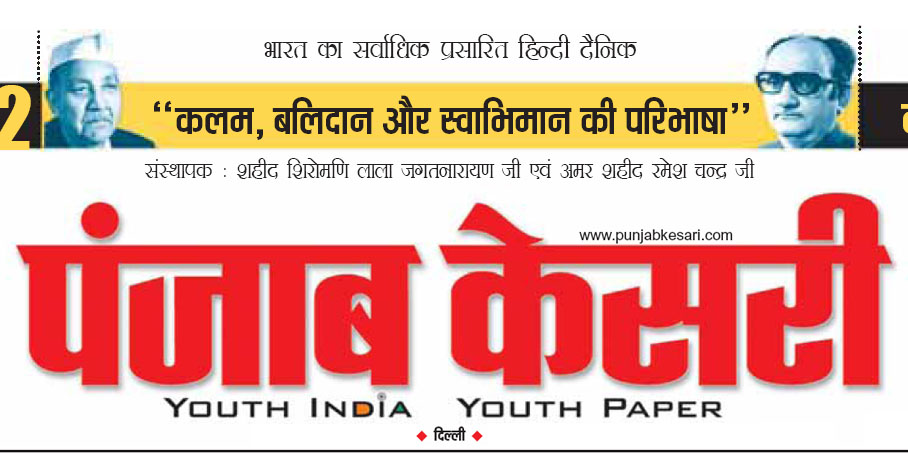

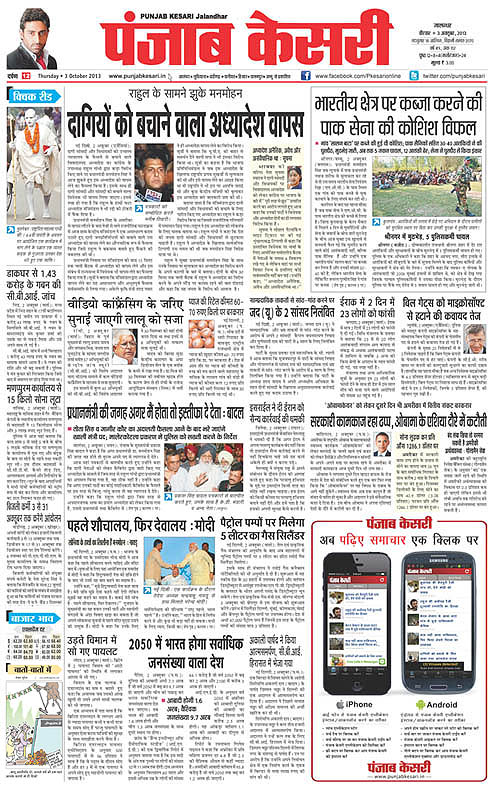
- Punjab Kesari header with the photos of late founders Lala Jagat Narain and Romesh Chander
- Type: Daily newspaper
- Format: Broadsheet
- Owner: Ashwini Kumar Chopra
- Founder: Lala Jagat Narain
- Publisher: The Hindsamachar Ltd. Jalandhar and Dainik Samachar Ltd., Delhi
- Editor-in-chief: Vijay Kumar Chopra
- Editor: Vijay Chopra (Jalandhar) and Ashwini Kumar Chopra (Delhi)
- Managing editor: Vijay Kumar Chopra
- Founded: 1965
- Political alignment: Liberal
- Language: Hindi
- Headquarters: Jalandhar, Punjab; Delhi
- Country: India
- Circulation: 1,159,489 Daily (as of Jul - Dec 2015)
- Website: Jalandhar; Delhi; Haryana

Punjab Kesari (lit. 'The Lion of Punjab') is a Hindi-language newspaper published from many centres in Punjab, Haryana, Rajasthan, Himachal Pradesh and Delhi in India. It is owned by the Punjab Kesari group, Jalandhar (The Hindsamachar Ltd.) and Dainik Samachar Ltd., Delhi. It is one of the four newspapers started by the group; the other three are Hind Samachar in Urdu, Jagbani in Punjabi and Navodaya Times in Hindi from Delhi NCR.

The newspaper was established by Lala Jagat Narain and later on his elder son Romesh Chander took over the reins. However, during the days of Punjab insurgency, both were assassinated, in 1981 and 1984 respectively.
The management also established Shaheed Parivar Fund (martyrs' welfare fund) to provide help to the affected families.

== Publication centres ==
The newspaper has a daily circulation of approximate 1,571,000 copies which are printed from the following locations:

- Jalandhar (since 1965)
- Delhi (1983)
- Ambala Cantt (1991)
- Palampur (2004)
- Ludhiana (2004)
- Jaipur (2006)
- Panipat (2006)
- Hisar (2006)
- Jammu (2007)
- Mohali (2008),
- Chandigarh (2009)
- Shimla (2009)

== Punjab Kesari on internet ==
Digital Portals: publish news on their respective websites from two different places in India, i.e., Delhi on PunjabKesari.com and Jalandhar on PunjabKesari.in. As per Alexa, a web traffic data and analytics, Jalandhar group's website PunjabKesari.in is ranked 523 in India and Delhi group's website PunjabKesari.com is ranked 9425 in India on 17 March 2018.

Bollywood Kesari: Delhi group launched a Bollywood niche website under the brand name Bollywood Kesari.

Cricket Kesari: Delhi group launched a cricket niche website recently under the brand name Cricket Kesari and its Facebook page has over 121k likes. Sports Punjab kesari site is: sports.punjabkesari.in

Shayari: Delhi group also launched a Shayari specific Facebook page named Shayari

== Prominent columnists ==
- Khushwant Singh
- Shekhar Gurera (Cartoonist)
- Feroze Varun Gandhi
- Poonam I Kaushik
- Shanta Kumar
- Vineet Narain
- Virendra Kapur
- B G Verghese
- Balbir Punj
- Mahmood Shaam
- Karan Thapar
- Kalyani Shankar
- Manmohan Sharma
- Neera Chopra
- Maneka Gandhi
- Chandermohan
- Chander Trikha
- Nerja Chaudhry

== Gallery ==
Punjab Kesari, Jalandhar

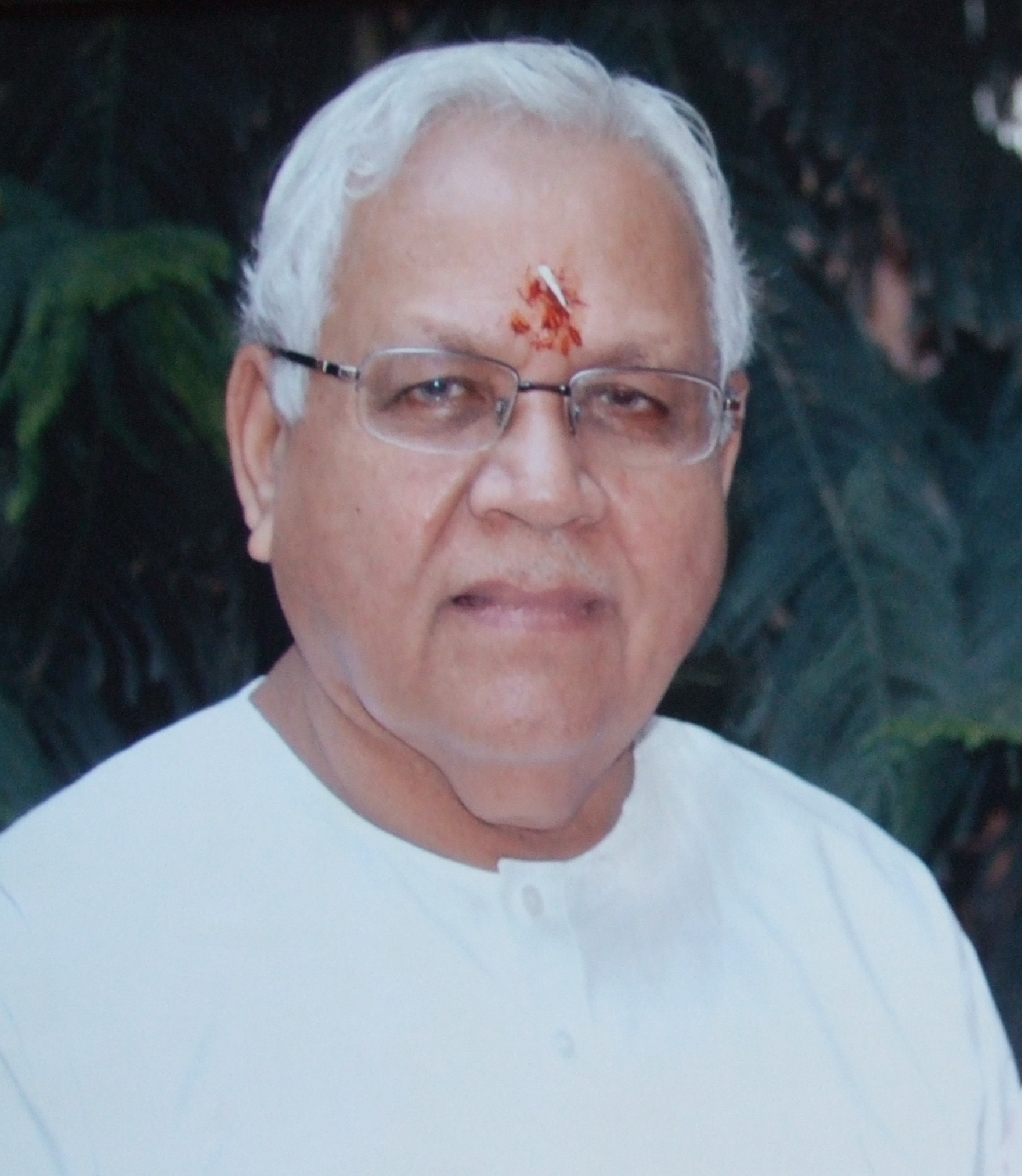
Vijay Kumar Chopra, Editor-in-Chief cum Managing Director Punjab Kesari

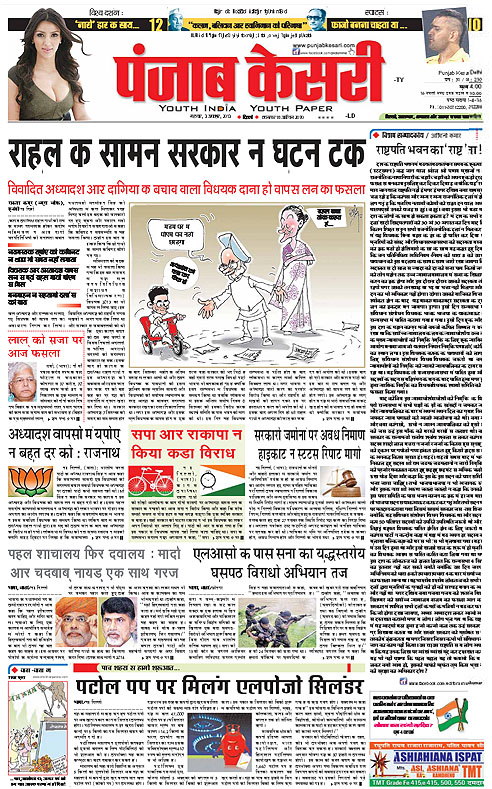
Punjab Kesari, Delhi

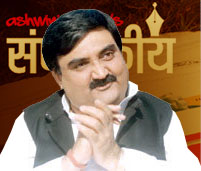
Ashwini Kumar Chopra (senior journalist, Resident Editor and Owner at Punjab Kesari, Delhi

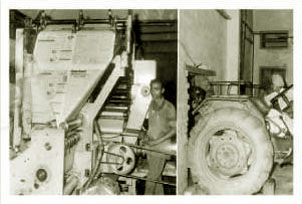
During 1974 emergency in India, when undeclared censorship was imposed on the press and the power supply was discontinued, the newspaper was printed by the alternative arrangements with tractors on diesel

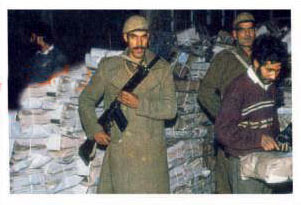
1984–92 : During the Punjab insurgency, due to the continuous threats and attack on media staff, the production, printing and distribution, every process was under strict police protection
