= D.A.V. College =

D.A.V. College Managing Committee is an educational organisation in India, affiliated with Dayananda Saraswati's Arya Samaj Hindu reform movement

It may specifically refer to these colleges of the organisation in India:

- BBK DAV College for Women, Amritsar, Punjab
- DAV College, Abohar, Punjab
- DAV College, Chandigarh
- DAV College, Kanpur, Uttar Pradesh
- D.A.V. College, Koraput, Odisha
- D.A.V. College (Lahore), Ambala City, Punjab
- D.A.V. College, Lucknow, Uttar Pradesh
- DAV Post Graduate College, Uttar Pradesh
- D.A.V. Post Graduate College, Dehradun, Uttarakhand
- D.A.V. Post-Graduate College, Siwan, Bihar
- Dayanand college, Hisar, Haryana
- Dayanand College, Ajmer, Rajasthan
- Dayanand College Latur, Maharashtra
- Dayanand College of Law, Kanpur, Uttar Pradesh
- Dayanand Medical College & Hospital, Ludhiana, Punjab* Pannalal Girdharlal Dayanand Anglo Vedic College, Delhi
- DAV Institute of Engineering and Technology (DAVIET), Jalandhar, Punjab

== See also ==
- DAV University, Jalandhar, Punjab, India
