= Ashwini Kumar Chopra =

Indian journalist (1956–2020)

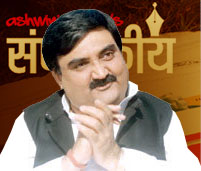
- Director, Editor : Punjab Kesari

Member of Parliament, Lok Sabha
- In office 16 May 2014 – 23 May 2019
- Preceded by: Arvind Kumar Sharma
- Succeeded by: Sanjay Bhatia
- Constituency: Karnal

Personal details
- Born: 11 June 1956 Jalandhar, Punjab, India
- Died: 18 January 2020 (aged 63) Gurugram, Haryana, India
- Spouse: Kiran Chopra
- Children: 3
- Education: Graduation from Guru Nanak Dev University. Masters in Journalism from Punjab University.
- Occupation: Cricketer, Journalist, Politician
- Nickname: Minna

Ashwini Kumar Chopra (11 June 1956 – 18 January 2020), was a senior journalist and resident editor of the Punjab Kesari, in Delhi. He got elected to 16th Lok Sabha from Karnal as a candidate of the Bharatiya Janata Party, and was the eldest son of the third generation from the journalists' family who own the Hindsamachar group of newspapers. During the days of terrorism in Punjab, his grandfather Lala Jagat Narain and father Romesh Chander were assassinated in 1981 and 1984 respectively. In their collective bid to curb terrorism through a drive by the journalists and activists, Punjab Kesari is commonly called the newspaper of martyr journalists.

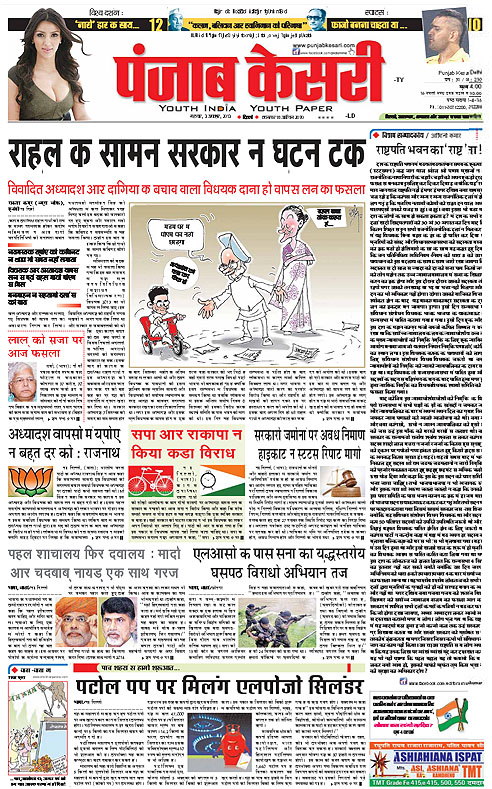
Punjab Kesari, Delhi with daily Special Editorial at page one

== Education ==
After graduating from Guru Nanak Dev University, Ashwini obtained a master's degree in journalism from Punjab University. In his quest for in depth study of journalism, he opted for a master's degree in journalism from University of California, Berkeley and thereafter under the guidance of his grandfather and father stepped into journalism and while being in USA Ashwini worked for the San Francisco Chronicle for about 6 months and later he worked with The Times Group in Delhi, India.

== Cricketing career ==
Prior to entering journalism full-time, he played under the name of Ashwini Minna for Punjab in the Ranji Trophy and played a total of 25 first class matches between 1975–76 and 1979–80. He was a leg-spinner and was being considered for the Indian team from 1975 to 1977, but could not do much against the MCC touring team of 1976–77. His maiden first-class wicket was that of Sunil Gavaskar in the Irani Cup match of 1975–76.

== Career ==
Ashwini is well known for his daily page one, Special Editorial with bold and popular wording. He was given Lok Sabha ticket by BJP for 2014 from Karnal. He was the New MP from Karnal. He won by a huge margin.

General Election, 2014
Party	Candidate	Votes	%	±%
BJP	Ashwini Kumar Chopra	594,817	49.84%	+26.98%
INC	Dr. Arvind Kumar Sharma	234,670	19.66%	−17.91%
INLD	Jaswinder Singh Sandhu	187,902	15.74%	+15.74%
BSP	Virender Maratha	102,628	8.60%	−19.56%
NOTA	None of the above	2,929	0.25%	−−−
Majority		360,147	30.18%	+15.47%
Turnout		1,193,500		
BJP gain from INC		Swing		

Political offices
Preceded by Arvind Kumar Sharma	Member of Parliament for Karnal; 2014 – 2019	Succeeded by Sanjay Bhatia
