= Karnal Lok Sabha constituency =

Lok Sabha constituency in Haryana

Coordinates: 29.7°N 77.0°E

Karnal HR-5
- Lok Sabha constituency
- Interactive Map Outlining Karnal Lok Sabha constituency

Constituency details
- Country: India
- Region: North India
- State: Haryana
- Assembly constituencies: Nilokheri; Indri; Karnal; Gharaunda; Assandh; Panipat Rural; Panipat City; Israna; Samalkha
- Established: 1952
- Reservation: None

Member of Parliament
- 18th Lok Sabha
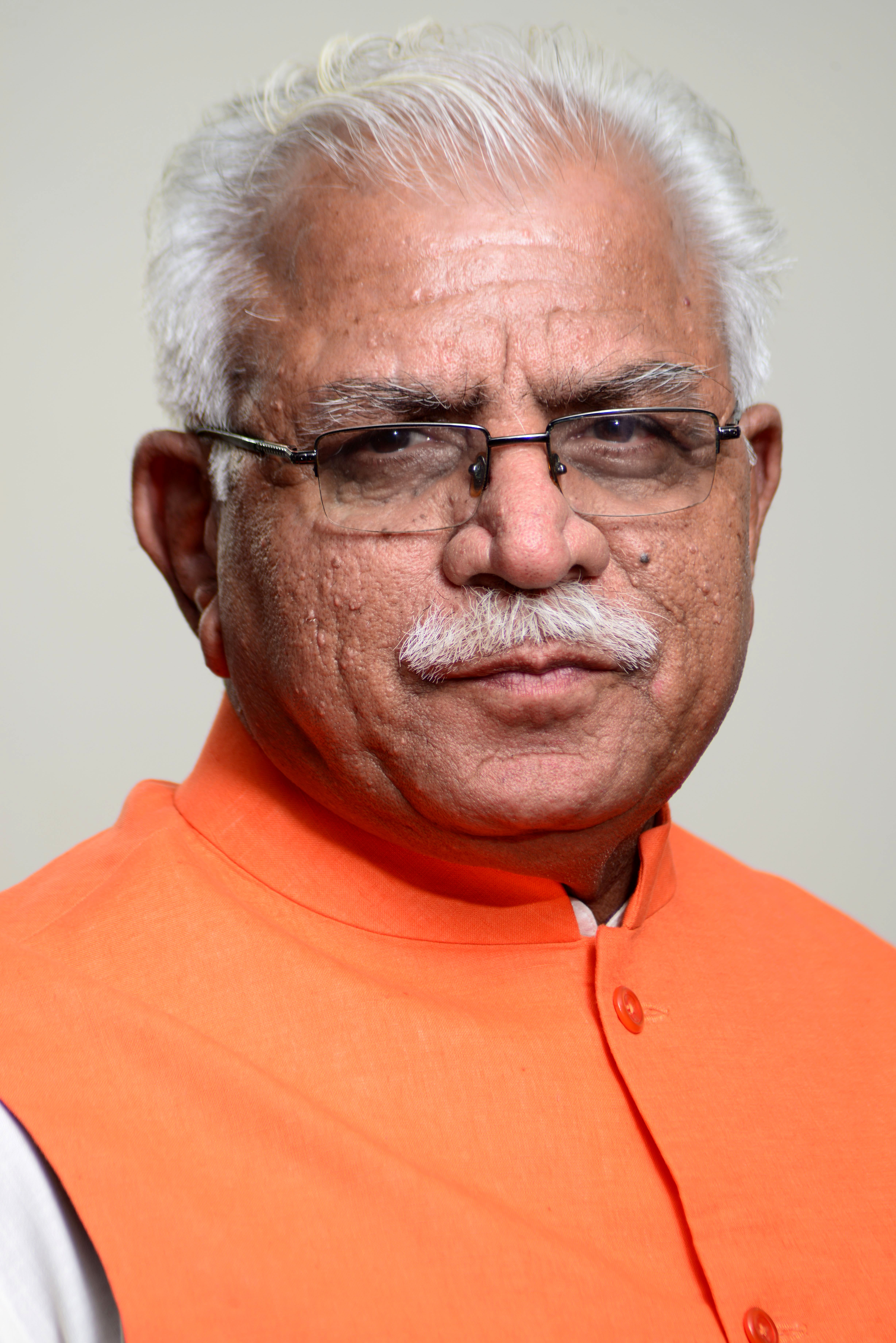
- Incumbent Manohar Lal Khattar; Union Minister of Power; Union Minister of Housing and Urban Affairs
- Party: BJP
- Alliance: NDA
- Elected year: 2024

Karnal Lok Sabha constituency is one of the 10 Lok Sabha (parliamentary) constituencies in Haryana state in northern India.

== Assembly segments ==
At present, Karnal Lok Sabha constituency comprises Nine Vidhan Sabha (legislative assembly) constituencies. These are:

#	Name	District	Member	Party	Leading (in 2024)
19	Nilokheri (SC)	Karnal	Bhagwan Das	BJP	BJP
20	Indri	Karnal	Ram Kumar Kashyap	BJP	BJP
21	Karnal	Karnal	Jagmohan Anand	BJP	BJP
22	Gharaunda	Karnal	Harvinder Kalyan	BJP	BJP
23	Assandh	Karnal	Yogender Singh Rana	BJP	BJP
24	Panipat Rural	Panipat	Mahipal Dhanda	BJP	BJP
25	Panipat City	Panipat	Parmod Kumar Vij	BJP	BJP
26	Israna (SC)	Panipat	Krishan Lal Panwar	BJP	BJP
27	Samalkha	Panipat	Manmohan Bhadana	BJP	BJP

== Members of Parliament ==
Year	Winner	Party
1952	Virendar Kumar Satyawadi	Indian National Congress
1957	Subhadra Joshi	Indian National Congress
1962	Swami Rameshwaranand	Bharatiya Jana Sangh
1967	Madho Ram Sharma	Indian National Congress
1971	Madho Ram Sharma	Indian National Congress
1977	Bhagwat Dayal Sharma	Bharatiya Lok Dal
1978^	Mohinder Singh	Janata Party
1980	Chiranji Lal Sharma	Indian National Congress (I)
1984	Chiranji Lal Sharma	Indian National Congress
1989	Chiranji Lal Sharma	Indian National Congress
1991	Chiranji Lal Sharma	Indian National Congress
1996	Ishwar Dayal Swami	Bharatiya Janata Party
1998	Bhajan Lal	Indian National Congress
1999	Ishwar Dayal Swami	Bharatiya Janata Party
2004	Arvind Sharma	Indian National Congress
2009	Arvind Sharma	Indian National Congress
2014	Ashwini Chopra	Bharatiya Janata Party
2019	Sanjay Bhatia	Bharatiya Janata Party
2024	Manohar Lal Khattar	Bharatiya Janata Party

^ by-poll

== Election results ==
=== 2024 ===
2024 Indian general election: Karnal
Party	Candidate	Votes	%	±%
BJP	Manohar Lal Khattar	739,285	54.83	▼15.25
INC	Divyanshu Budhiraja	5,06,708	37.65	▲18.02
BSP	Inder Singh	32,508	2.42	▼2.75
NCP-SP	Virender Maratha	29,151	2.17	New
JJP	Devender Kadian	11,467	0.85	New
Majority		2,32,577	17.18	▼33.26
Turnout		13,46,656	63.83	▼4.52
BJP hold		Swing		

=== 2019 ===
2019 Indian general elections: Karnal
Party	Candidate	Votes	%	±%
BJP	Sanjay Bhatia	911,594	70.08	▲20.24
INC	Kuldip Sharma	2,55,452	19.63	▼0.02
BSP	Pankaj	67,183	5.17	▼3.43
AAP	Krishan Kumar Aggarwal	22,084	1.70	N/A
INLD	Dharmvir Padha	15,797	1.21	▼14.53
None of the Above	None of the Above	5,463	0.48	▲0.23
Majority		6,56,142	50.45	▲20.26
Turnout		13,01,474	68.35	▼2.51
BJP hold		Swing	▲10.13	

=== 2014 ===
2014 Indian general elections: Karnal
Party	Candidate	Votes	%	±%
BJP	Ashwini Kumar Chopra	594,817	49.84	▲26.98
INC	Arvind Kumar Sharma	2,34,670	19.66	▼17.91
INLD	Jaswinder Singh Sandhu	1,87,902	15.74	▲15.74
BSP	Virender Maratha	1,02,628	8.60	▼19.56
NOTA	None of the Above	2,929	0.25	−−−
Majority		3,60,147	30.18	▲15.47
Turnout		11,93,500	70.86	▲4.22
BJP gain from INC		Swing		

=== 2009 ===
2009 Indian general elections: Karnal
Party	Candidate	Votes	%	±%
INC	Arvind Kumar Sharma	304,698	37.57	
BSP	Virender Maratha	2,28,352	28.15	
BJP	Ishwar Dayal Swami	1,85,437	22.86	
HJC(BL)	Dr. Ramesh Chhabra	49,226	6.07	
Majority		76,346	9.41	
Turnout		8,11,029	66.64	
INC hold		Swing		

== See also ==
- Karnal district
- Panipat district
- List of constituencies of the Lok Sabha
