= Matri Shree Media Award =

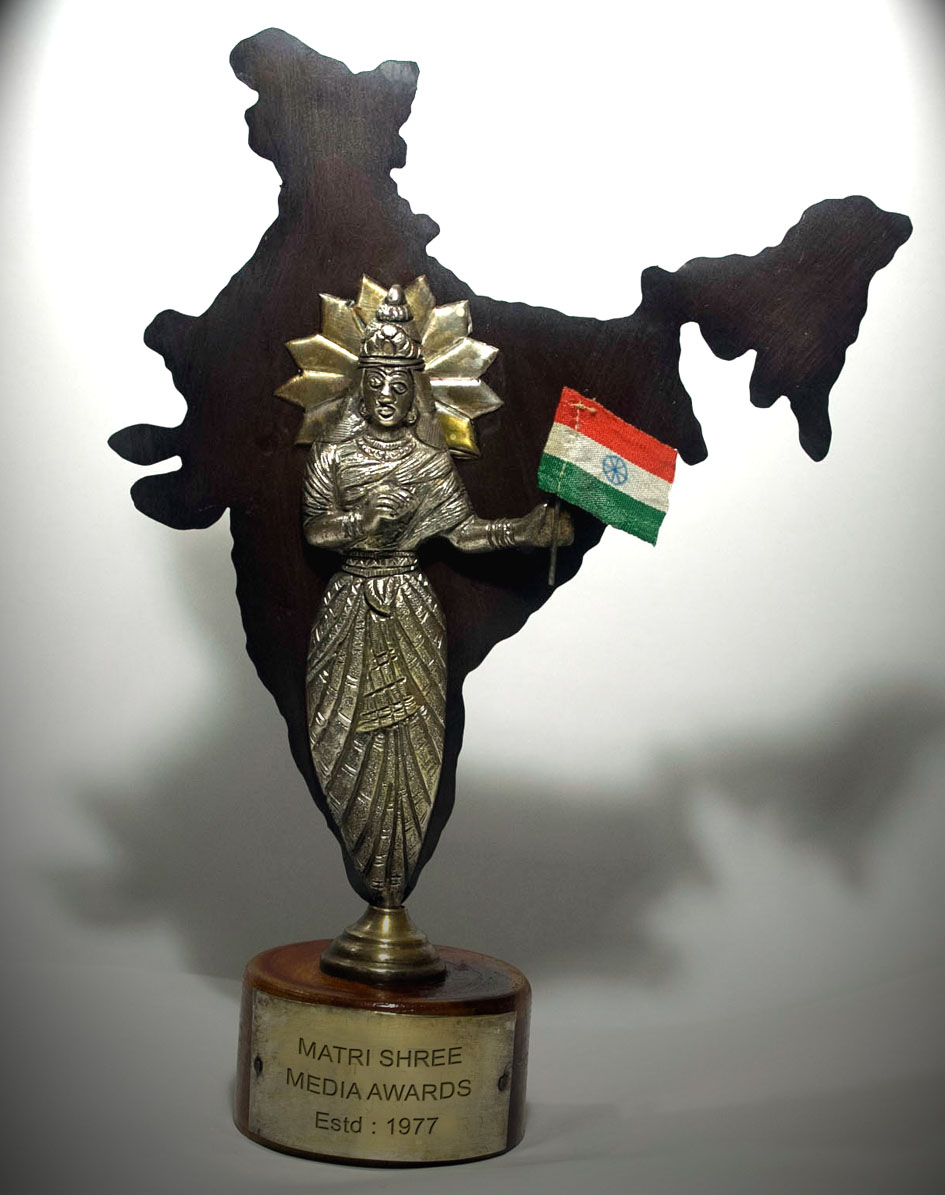
- Trophy of Matri Shree Media Award
- Awarded for: The excellence in the field of print as well as electronic media
- Location: Delhi, India
- First award: 1975
- Website: MSMA

The Matri Shree Media Award is a series of awards for outstanding performance in different areas of journalism and related fields awarded in New Delhi, India. This award was established during the days of The Emergency (India) in 1975. Since then, this award has been awarded annually to 25 outstanding candidates in print journalism and electronic media. Starting in 2000, Indian filmmakers were also eligible to receive awards. Senior Journalist Dinesh Sharma is the convener of the award committee.

== Prominent recipients ==
=== Journalists ===
Lala Jagat Narain, Ramesh Chander, Dr Rajender Mathur, Khushwant Singh, Ashwini Chopra, Mahender Khanna, Harish Chopra, Shekhar Singh Jha, Pankaj Vohra, Dilbar Gothi, Ashok Sharma, Vijay J. Darda, Banwarilal Purohit, Manish Pandey of TOI, Jitesh Wadhawan of PTI, Naresh Kaushik of PTI, R K Saxena (UNI Varta), Javed Akhtar (UNI Urdu service), Faizal Khan (UNI), Zia-us-Salam (film critic, the Hindu) Anuj Gupta, Agyaraam Prem, K Narinder, Anil Narinder, Bhavna Vij, Kuldeep Avinash Bhandari, Shakeel Hasan Shamsi, Deepak Dholkia, Indiwar Parijat, Dinesh Upretee, M K Laul, Ashok Singhal, Rakesh Gupta, Aditi Kaul, Rakesh Dua, Poonam Pandey, Usha Pahwa, Meenakshi Rao, Sumit Kumar Singh, Pramod Kumar Singh, Anup Verma etc.

=== Cartoonists ===
Irfan Hussain (Outlook), Shekhar Gurera, R Prasad, Rohnit, Surendra (The Hindu), Ismail Lehri, Sandeep Adhvaryu (TOI) etc.

=== Photo-Journalists ===
Ravi Batra, Dhruv Kumar, Shailesh Seth (cameraman - Star News), Surender Mandral (cameraman - Zee News), Ritu Rajput (AIR), H C Tiwari (The Hindustan Times), Manoj Verma (India Today), C N Rao (Eenadu), Sirish Shete (PTI) etc.

== Annually Awarded Indian Films ==
- Umrao Jaan (1982)
- Prem Rog (1983)
- Bombay (1996)
- Black (2005)
- Apharan (2006)
- Krrish (2007)
- Cheeni Kum (2008)
- Paa (2010)
- Paan Singh Tomar (2012)
- Barfi (2013)
- Highway (2014)
- Mary Kom (2015)
- Neerja (2016)
- Sarbjit (2017)
- Toilet: Ek Prem Katha (2018)
- Badhaai Ho (2019)

== Awardees of Matru Shree Media Award ==
| S.No / Date | Film | Journalist (Print) | Photo Journalist | Cartoonist | Journalist (Electronics) | Video Journalist |
|---|---|---|---|---|---|---|
| 42nd / 2017 | Sarbjit | Santu Das (UNI), Archana (Univarta), Maqsood (UNI), Rajesh Rai(PTI) | ... | Surendra (The Hindu) | ... | ... |
| 43rd / 2018 | Toilet: Ek Prem Katha | Sanya Pandey (UNI), Rajiv Upreti (Univarta), Amandeep Shukla (PTI), Vaibhav (Bhasha) | Vipin (Jagran), Manas Ranjan (Tribune) | Ismail Lehri (Bhaskar) | ... | Kartik Harbola (LSTV) |
| 44th / 2019 | Badhaai Ho | Sarvotam Jaipuriyar (PTI), Namita Singh (Bhasha), A P Singh (UNI), Jitender (Univarta), Poonam Gaur (NBT) | D P Mishra (PTI), Rahul Singh (ANI), Paras (Jagran) | Sandeep Adhvaryu (TOI) | Vishnu Sharma (India News), Ranjeet Kumar (Aajtak) | Dilip Avasthi (India News) |
