= The Hitavada =

English-language daily newspaper in India

- The 31 January 2012, Nagpur edition of The Hitavada
- Type: Daily newspaper
- Format: Broadsheet
- Publisher: Progressive Writers and Publishers
- Editor-in-chief: Banwarilal Purohit
- Editor: Vijay Phansikar
- Founded: 1911
- Language: English
- Headquarters: The Hitavada, Pt. Jawaharlal Nehru Marg, Nagpur – 12
- Website: www.thehitavada.com

The Hitavada is an English daily newspaper circulating mainly in Central parts of India. Founded in 1911 by freedom fighter Gopal Krishna Gokhale in Nagpur, the newspaper was taken over by Purohit and Company, owned by Banwarilal Purohit, the former Bharatiya Janata Party MP from Nagpur and former Governor of Punjab. In 2011, it completed its 100 years and celebrated its centenary festival which was inaugurated by Pratibha Patil, then President of India.

== History ==
The Hitavada was started in the central Indian city of Nagpur by freedom fighter Gopal Krishna Gokhale. It was the first and the only English daily of Nagpur. In the mid 20th century, it found a competitor in another English daily, the Nagpur Times, which however was later shut down due to bankruptcy. The Hitavada in 1978, was taken over by Banwarilal Purohit, who later became the Member of Parliament, Lok Sabha under BJP, from Late Vidya Charan Shukla, who owned the Progressive Writers and Publishers which published this paper. The Hitavada, today, is the largest selling English broadsheet daily of Central India with Nagpur and Raipur, though it competes with Indian Express, The Times of India, and Lokmat Times in Nagpur, with Hindustan Times and Central Chronicle in Bhopal and Raipur. It has a daily circulation of over 200,000 copies across the Central India with 130,000 in Nagpur alone.

== Editions and supplements ==
The Hitavada is simultaneously published from the cities of Nagpur, Jabalpur, Raipur, and Bhopal. Every city edition carries a special supplement called City Line that deals with the local city news and engagements. The Hitavada also has regional editions:
1. Vidarbha Line, distributed outside the Metropolitan areas of Nagpur and rest of Vidarbha
2. Chhattisgarh Line, distributed in Chhattisgarh
3. Madhya Pradesh Line, distributed in Bhopal and other areas surrounding Jabalpur
Anshuman Bhargava is the State Editor. The other supplements include Money (Mondays), Future (Tuesdays), Woman's World (Wednesdays), Twinkle Star (Saturdays), Insight (Sundays). It also distributes a supplement called The Knowledge Magazine in schools, especially meant for children.
