= Sanjay Bhatia =

Indian politician

Member of Parliament, Rajya Sabha
- Incumbent
- Assumed office 10 April 2026
- Preceded by: Kiran Choudhry
- Constituency: Haryana

Member of Parliament, Lok Sabha
- In office 23 May 2019 – 4 June 2024
- Preceded by: Ashwini Kumar Chopra
- Succeeded by: Manohar Lal Khattar
- Constituency: Karnal

National General Secretary of Bharatiya Janata Party
- Incumbent
- Assumed office 17 August 2026
- President: Nitin Nabin

General Secretary of Bharatiya Janata Party, Haryana
- In office February 2015 – May 2021

Personal details
- Born: 29 July 1967 (age 59) Panipat, Haryana, India
- Party: Bharatiya Janata Party
- Spouse: Anju Bhatia
- Children: 2
- Education: Kurukshetra University
- Occupation: Politician; social worker
- Website: http://www.sanjaybhatia.co.in/
- Nickname: Bunty Bhai

Sanjay Bhatia (born 29 July 1967) is an Indian politician of the Bharatiya Janata Party from Haryana. He is currently serving as a member of Rajya Sabha, the upper house of Indian Parliament, from Haryana. He was an elected Member of Parliament from Karnal constituency in 2019 Lok Sabha election. He also serves as State general secretary at Bhartiya Janata Party (BJP), Haryana and former chairman, Haryana Khadi and Village Industries Board.
