= Karnal Assembly constituency =

Constituency of the Haryana legislative assembly in India

Coordinates: 29.69°N 76.99°E

- Constituency No. 21 for the Haryana Legislative Assembly

Constituency details
- Country: India
- Region: North India
- State: Haryana
- District: Karnal
- Lok Sabha constituency: Karnal
- Established: 1967
- Total electors: 2,65,466
- Reservation: None

Member of Legislative Assembly
- 15th Haryana Legislative Assembly
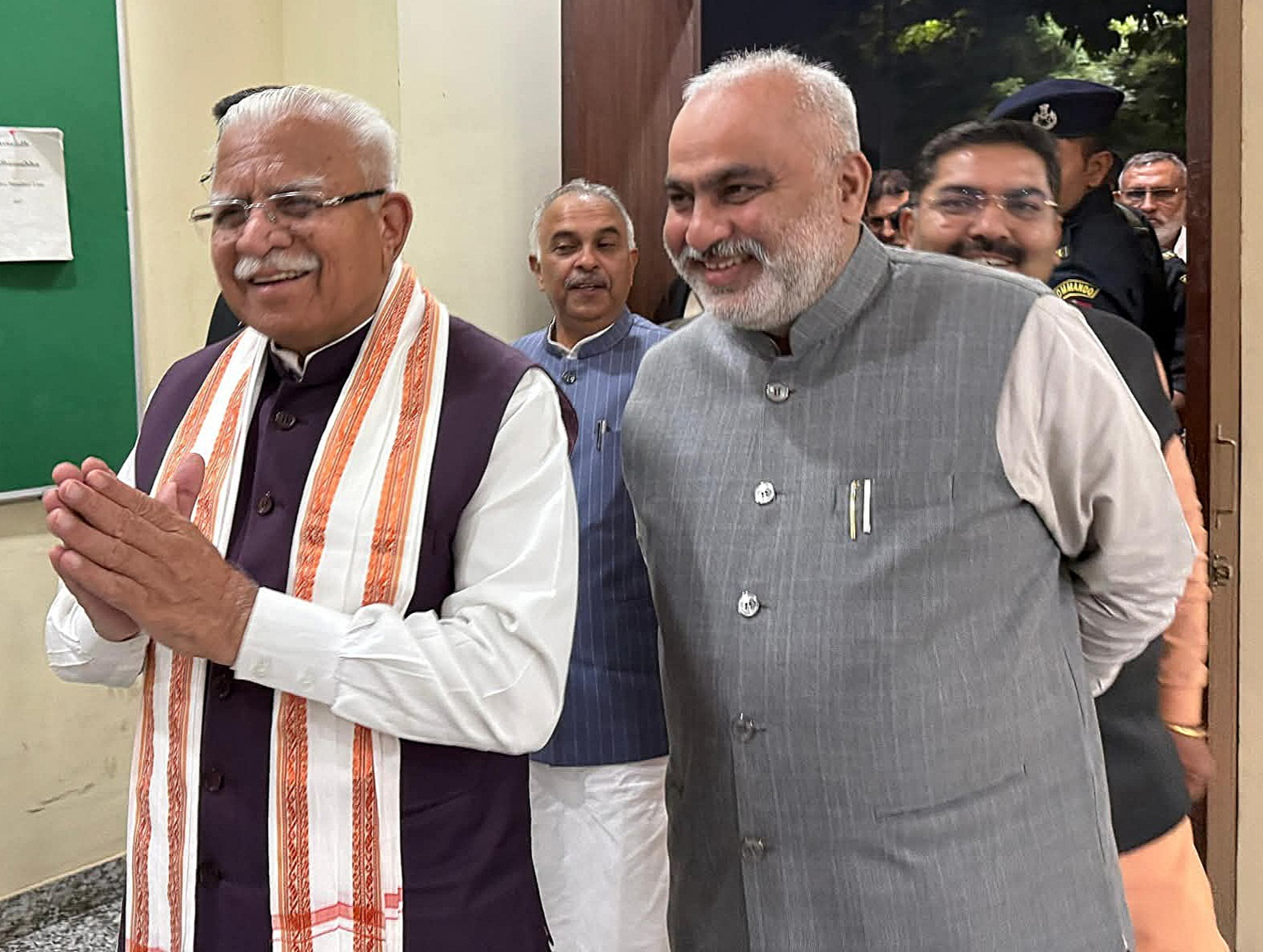
- Incumbent Jagmohan Anand
- Party: BJP
- Alliance: NDA
- Elected year: 2024

Karnal Assembly Constituency is a part of Karnal district. It is one of the nine seats which make up Karnal (Lok Sabha constituency).

== Members of Legislative Assembly ==
Year	Member	Party
1957	Arjun Arora	Indian National Congress
1962	Sardar Madho Singh	Communist Party of India
1967	Ram Lal	Bharatiya Jana Sangh
1968	Shanti Prasad	Independent
1972	Ram Lal	Bharatiya Jana Sangh
1977	Ram Lal	Janata Party
1982	Shanti Devi	Indian National Congress
1987	Lachhman Dass	Bharatiya Janata Party
1991	Jai Parkash Gupta	Indian National Congress
1996	Shashipal Mehta	Bharatiya Janata Party
2000	Jai Parkash Gupta	Independent
2005	Sumita Singh	Indian National Congress
2009	Sumita Singh	Indian National Congress
2014	Manohar Lal Khattar	Bharatiya Janata Party
2019	Manohar Lal Khattar	Bharatiya Janata Party
2024^	Nayab Singh Saini	Bharatiya Janata Party
2024	Jagmohan Anand	Bharatiya Janata Party

== Election results ==
=== Assembly Election 2024 ===
2024 Haryana Legislative Assembly election: Karnal
Party	Candidate	Votes	%	±%
BJP	Jagmohan Anand	90,006	59.66	▼2.77
INC	Sumita Virk	56,354	37.35	▲2.22
AAP	Sunil Bindal	1,723	1.14	New
INLD	Surjeet Singh	950	0.63	New
NOTA	None of the Above	854	0.57	▼0.17
Margin of victory		33,652	22.31	▼4.99
Turnout		1,50,871	56.59	▼1.31
Registered electors		2,65,466		▲1.44
BJP hold		Swing	▼2.77	

=== Assembly by-election 2024 ===
2024 Haryana Legislative Assembly by-election: Karnal
Party	Candidate	Votes	%	±%
BJP	Nayab Singh Saini	95,004	62.43	▼1.28
INC	Tarlochan Singh	53,464	35.13	▲7.45
JJP	Rajinder	1,073	0.71	New
NOTA	None of the Above	1,113	0.73	▼0.83
Margin of victory		41,540	27.30	▼8.73
Turnout		1,52,172	57.90	▲5.53
Registered electors		2,62,821		▲9.75
BJP hold		Swing	▼1.28	

=== Assembly Election 2019 ===
2019 Haryana Legislative Assembly election: Karnal
Party	Candidate	Votes	%	±%
BJP	Manohar Lal Khattar	79,906	63.72	▲4.97
INC	Tarlochan Singh	34,718	27.68	▲18.56
JJP	Tej Bahadur	3,192	2.55	New
BSP	Satish Balmiki	2,597	2.07	▼0.38
NOTA	Nota	1,956	1.56	New
AAP	Mahinder Pal Rathi	1,402	1.12	New
Independent	Satpal Sahil Hindustani	858	0.68	New
Margin of victory		45,188	36.03	▼9.39
Turnout		1,25,408	52.37	▼15.47
Registered electors		2,39,477		▲15.71
BJP hold		Swing	▲4.97	

=== Assembly Election 2014 ===
2014 Haryana Legislative Assembly election: Karnal
Party	Candidate	Votes	%	±%
BJP	Manohar Lal Khattar	82,485	58.75	▲44.06
Independent	Jai Parkash	18,712	13.33	New
INLD	Manoj Wadhwa	17,685	12.60	▲8.71
INC	Surender Narwal	12,804	9.12	▼26.31
BSP	Ranbir Singh	3,437	2.45	▼8.54
Independent	Suresh Matlauda	2,230	1.59	New
HJC(BL)	Tejpal Garg	943	0.67	▼31.08
Margin of victory		63,773	45.42	▲41.74
Turnout		1,40,405	67.84	▲4.00
Registered electors		2,06,972		▲30.42
BJP gain from INC		Swing	▲23.32	

=== Assembly Election 2009 ===
2009 Haryana Legislative Assembly election: Karnal
Party	Candidate	Votes	%	±%
INC	Sumita Singh	35,894	35.43	▼17.57
HJC(BL)	Jai Parkash	32,163	31.75	New
BJP	Chander Parkash Kathuria	14,883	14.69	▼0.68
BSP	Balvinder Singh Kalra	11,128	10.98	▲9.76
INLD	Ashok	3,932	3.88	▼2.66
Independent	Sushil Kumar	884	0.87	New
Independent	Anand Parkash	680	0.67	New
Independent	Narender Saroha	525	0.52	New
Margin of victory		3,731	3.68	▼30.13
Turnout		1,01,307	63.84	▲0.55
Registered electors		1,58,695		▼0.13
INC hold		Swing	▼17.57	

=== Assembly Election 2005 ===
2005 Haryana Legislative Assembly election: Karnal
Party	Candidate	Votes	%	±%
INC	Sumita Singh	53,300	53.01	▲42.56
Independent	Jai Parkash	19,303	19.20	New
BJP	Shashipal Mehta	15,455	15.37	▼17.61
INLD	Dharam Pal Gupta	6,574	6.54	New
BRP	Pt Kimti Lal Sharma	2,971	2.95	New
BSP	Zile Singh	1,229	1.22	▲0.52
Independent	Ramesh Kumar	646	0.64	New
Margin of victory		33,997	33.81	▲29.37
Turnout		1,00,556	63.28	▲3.63
Registered electors		1,58,894		▲12.60
INC gain from Independent		Swing	▲15.59	

=== Assembly Election 2000 ===
2000 Haryana Legislative Assembly election: Karnal
Party	Candidate	Votes	%	±%
Independent	Jai Parkash	31,495	37.41	New
BJP	Satish Kalra	27,762	32.98	▼4.55
INC	Suresh Gupta S/O Som Datt	8,790	10.44	▼18.19
Independent	Suresh Gupta S/O Daya Ram	8,276	9.83	New
Independent	Nathi Ram	3,177	3.77	New
Independent	Narender Kumar	825	0.98	New
Independent	Bhagat Ram	797	0.95	New
Independent	Brij Bhushan	779	0.93	New
Independent	Suresh Kumar S/O Dharam Pal	625	0.74	New
BSP	Palvinder Singh	594	0.71	▼1.70
Margin of victory		3,733	4.43	▼4.46
Turnout		84,185	59.69	▼6.09
Registered electors		1,41,114		▼1.95
Independent gain from BJP		Swing	▼0.12	

=== Assembly Election 1996 ===
1996 Haryana Legislative Assembly election: Karnal
Party	Candidate	Votes	%	±%
BJP	Shashipal Mehta	35,511	37.53	▲13.75
INC	Jai Parkash	27,093	28.63	▼23.00
AIIC(T)	Suresh Kumar	15,936	16.84	New
SAP	Brij Kumar	7,044	7.44	New
BSP	Suresh Kumar S/O Badlu Ram	2,272	2.40	New
JD	Ishwar Singh	1,878	1.98	New
Independent	Balwinder Singh	1,567	1.66	New
Margin of victory		8,418	8.90	▼18.97
Turnout		94,627	67.90	▲4.20
Registered electors		1,43,925		▲25.35
BJP gain from INC		Swing	▼14.11	

=== Assembly Election 1991 ===
1991 Haryana Legislative Assembly election: Karnal
Party	Candidate	Votes	%	±%
INC	Jai Parkash	36,485	51.63	▲7.59
BJP	Chetan Dass	16,798	23.77	▼28.77
Independent	Dalbir Singh Sandhu	7,690	10.88	New
JP	Brij Kumar	4,000	5.66	New
HVP	Darshan Lal	2,634	3.73	New
Independent	Suraj Parkash	360	0.51	New
Margin of victory		19,687	27.86	▲19.36
Turnout		70,660	63.07	▼0.42
Registered electors		1,14,814		▲16.24
INC gain from BJP		Swing	▼0.90	

=== Assembly Election 1987 ===
1987 Haryana Legislative Assembly election: Karnal
Party	Candidate	Votes	%	±%
BJP	Lachhman Dass	32,156	52.54	▲19.58
INC	Jai Prakash	26,955	44.04	▼12.58
Independent	Pardeep Kumar	381	0.62	New
Independent	Kashmira Singh	327	0.53	New
Margin of victory		5,201	8.50	▼15.16
Turnout		61,205	62.44	▼6.89
Registered electors		98,769		▲27.23
BJP gain from INC		Swing	▼4.08	

=== Assembly Election 1982 ===
1982 Haryana Legislative Assembly election: Karnal
Party	Candidate	Votes	%	±%
INC	Shanti Devi	30,267	56.62	▲37.65
BJP	Ram Lal	17,618	32.96	New
Independent	Paramjit Singh	1,814	3.39	New
JP	Avtar Singh	1,340	2.51	▼63.05
Independent	Kallu Ram	1,108	2.07	New
Independent	Bhartu Ram	418	0.78	New
Margin of victory		12,649	23.66	▼22.92
Turnout		53,457	69.70	▲7.36
Registered electors		77,633		▲24.02
INC gain from JP		Swing	▼8.93	

=== Assembly Election 1977 ===
1977 Haryana Legislative Assembly election: Karnal
Party	Candidate	Votes	%	±%
JP	Ram Lal	25,236	65.55	New
INC	Ram Sarup	7,303	18.97	▼23.21
Independent	Ram Piara	4,937	12.82	New
Independent	Shanti Prasad	885	2.30	New
Margin of victory		17,933	46.58	▲44.43
Turnout		38,497	62.20	▼7.21
Registered electors		62,599		▲7.62
JP gain from ABJS		Swing	▲21.21	

=== Assembly Election 1972 ===
1972 Haryana Legislative Assembly election: Karnal
Party	Candidate	Votes	%	±%
ABJS	Ram Lal	17,719	44.34	▲18.63
INC	Shanti Devi	16,857	42.18	▲20.06
Independent	Balwan Singh	1,602	4.01	New
Independent	Piara Lal	1,243	3.11	New
Independent	Kali Ram	1,203	3.01	New
Independent	Kallu	616	1.54	New
Independent	Radhe Shayam	542	1.36	New
Independent	Kashmira Singh	180	0.45	New
Margin of victory		862	2.16	▼5.18
Turnout		39,962	70.36	▲7.09
Registered electors		58,165		▲11.22
ABJS gain from Independent		Swing	▲11.29	

=== Assembly Election 1968 ===
1968 Haryana Legislative Assembly election: Karnal
Party	Candidate	Votes	%	±%
Independent	Shanti Prasad	10,648	33.05	New
ABJS	Ram Lal	8,285	25.71	▼5.67
INC	Roshan Lal	7,127	22.12	▼2.59
BKD	Ram Piara	6,162	19.12	New
Margin of victory		2,363	7.33	▲0.66
Turnout		32,222	63.01	▼11.31
Registered electors		52,295		▲2.27
Independent gain from ABJS		Swing	▲1.67	

=== Assembly Election 1967 ===
1967 Haryana Legislative Assembly election: Karnal
Party	Candidate	Votes	%	±%
ABJS	Ram Lal	11,702	31.38	
INC	L. Ram	9,215	24.71	
Independent	R. Piara	9,080	24.35	
Independent	S. Prasad	5,176	13.88	
Independent	P. Lal	1,924	5.16	
Independent	S. Sunder	196	0.53	
Margin of victory		2,487	6.67	
Turnout		37,293	76.29	
Registered electors		51,136		
ABJS gain from CPI		Swing		
