= Vijay Kumar Chopra =

Indian newspaper owner (born 1932)

Vijay Kumar
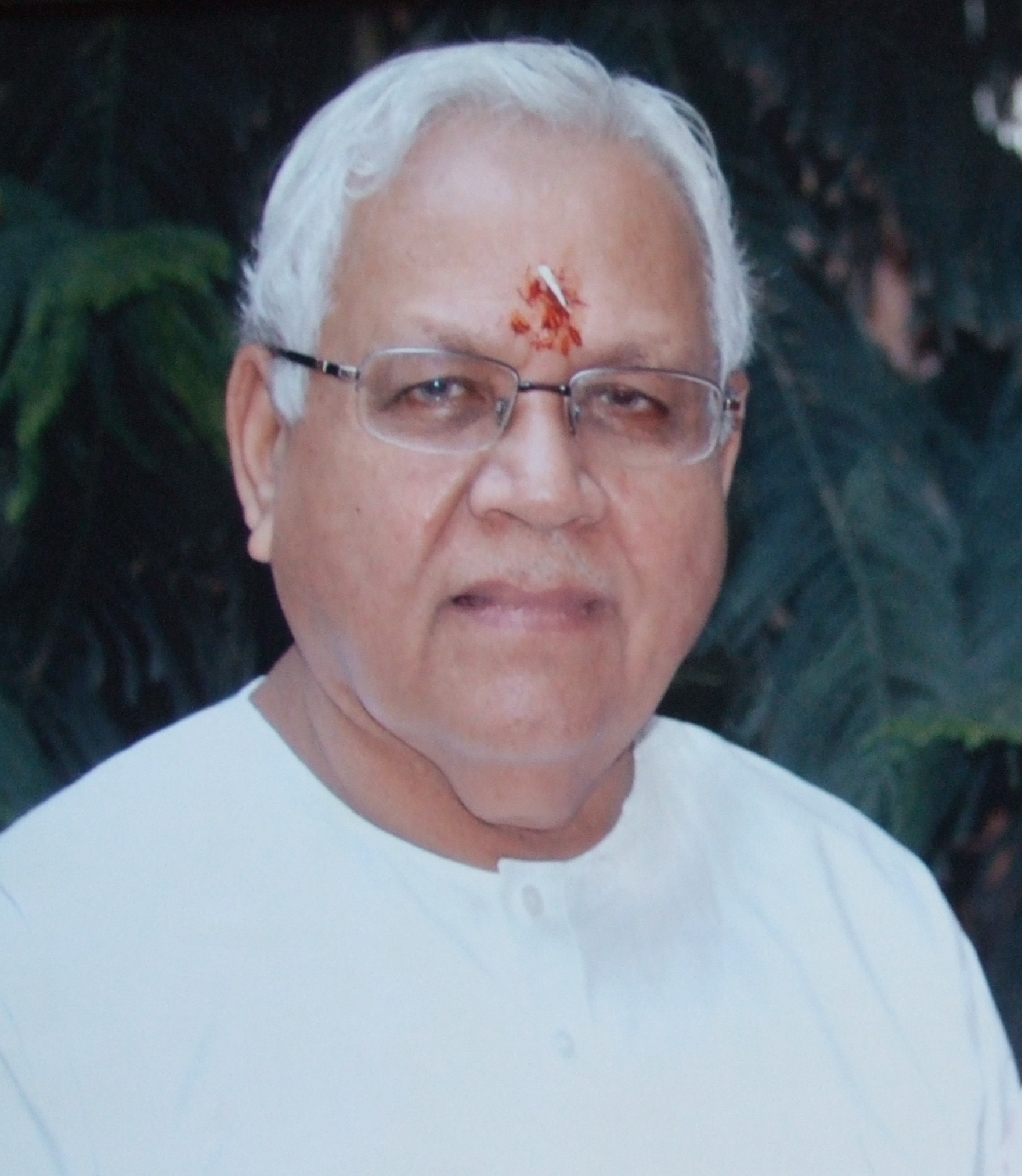

Personal details
- Born: 31 January 1932 (age 94) Lahore, British India
- Spouse: Swadesh Chopra (25 August 1937 - 7 July 2015)
- Children: 2 sons: Avinash Chopra and Amit Chopra
- Parent(s): Lala Jagat Narain and Shanti Devi

Vijay Kumar Chopra (born 31 January 1932, in Lahore) is the chief executive officer and editor in chief of the Punjab Kesari print news organisation. He is involved in social welfare work and has received a Padma Shri award (Literature & Education : 1990). In August 2009, he was elected by the Chairman of the Press Trust of India.

== Family ==
Chopra is a member of the Khatri clan of Punjabi origin and a follower of the Swami Dayanand (or Arya Samaj, a Hindu reform movement). He is the second child of Lala Jagat Narain and Shanti Devi. Lala Jagat Narain was killed in September 1981 by Khalistan supporters in Punjab, while his brother Romesh Chander was killed by Khalistan Supporters in Jalandhar in May 1984. Chopra has two sons, who both work in the family business.

== Education ==
In 1955, Chopra graduated from Doaba College, Jalandhar. In 1967, Chopra trained in the field of printing technology in Leipzig, Germany. In 1972, he underwent further training in the Thompson Foundation Newspaper Management Course in the United Kingdom.

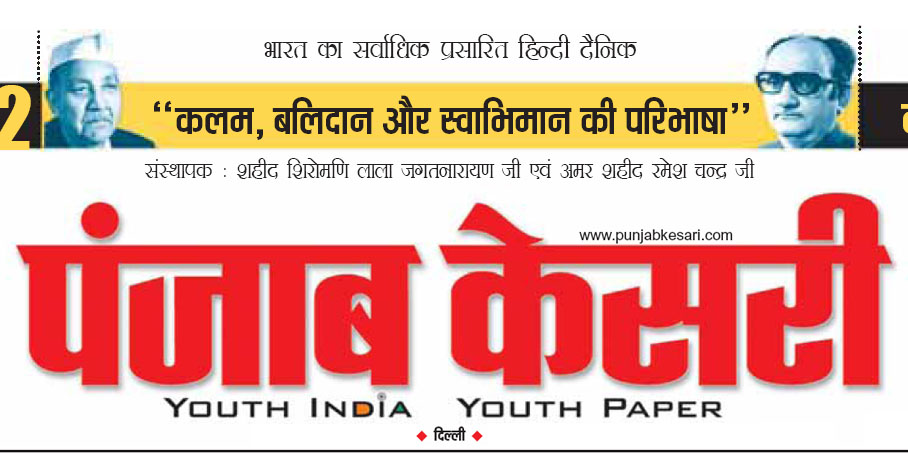
Punjab Kesari header with the photos of Late founders Lala Jagat Narain (father) & Romesh Chander (elder brother)

== Career ==
Chopra is the chief editor and CEO of Punjab Kesari Group, a newspaper organisation. He publishes three vernacular papers: the Punjab Kesari (in Hindi); the Jagbani (in Punjabi); and the Hind Samachar (in Urdu). The Punjab Kesari Group has eight locations: Jalandhar, Patiala, Ambala, Palampur, Ludhiana, Panipat, Hisar, Jammu, and Mohali.

== Honours ==
- The "Tama Patra". A recognition by the government for suffering during the National Movement for Independence. (Imprisonment for one year at age 15).
- 1990. The Padma Shri. The fourth highest civilian award given by the president.
- 1990. "FIE Award". Given by the "FIE Foundation". (For eminence in journalism).
- 1990. "F.F.I. Award". Given by the "Foundation of Freedom of Information", New Delhi. (For eminence in Journalism).
- 1991. "Munshi Premchand Award". After the Hindi-Urdu writer. (For fearless and impartial journalism).
- 1994. "Sant Namdev Award". Given by the "Vande Matram Sanghatana" social organization, in Pune. (For safeguarding the unity & integrity of the nation through fearless journalism).
- 1994. "Saraswati Award". Given by the "Haryana Accredited Press Reporters Union" (Haryana Union of Journalists, HUJ) in Kurukshetra.
- 1997. Entry in the Limca book of records. (Writer of the longest travelogue).
- "Punjab Ratan award." Given by the "Punjab Writers' Forum" in Patiala.
- 2005. "President’s Print Award" given at "PRINT 05" trade show in Chicago, USA.
- 2006. "Rashtriya Ekta Samman" by National Unity Conference, New Delhi.
- 2007 "Suryadatta Life Time Achievement Award" given by the Suryadatta group of institutes in Pune. (For fearless journalism).
- "Samaj Rattan award." Given by the Punjab Gayatri Foundation & Shri Gayatri Jan Kalyan Samiti, Ludhiana. (For religious, cultural and social activities).
- 2007 "Maulana Mohd. Ali Jauhar Award". Given by Maulana Mohd of the Ali Jauhar Academy, Delhi. (For journalism)
- 2007 "Bhagat Munshi Ram." Personality of the year. Given by the N.T.A.S. Patiala.
- "Guru Padam Jain Memorial Welfare Award."
- "Dr. D. R. Garg Memorial National Integration Award." Given by the Himotkarsh Sahitya, Sanskriti Avem Jan Kalyan Parishad (Regd.) in Una. (A social welfare organisation).
- "Bhagat Munshi Ram National Integration Award." Given by the National Theatre Arts Society, Patiala. (For journalism).
- "Manvadhikar Shiromani Award." Given by the Global Human Rights Council (R&C), 3234, Sector 44-D, Chandigandra

== Curriculum Vitae ==
- All India federation of master printers. President (2004) and member of executive committee.
- Press trust of India. Chairman. (2001 and 2009).
- The India newspaper society. President (2000) and member of executive committee.
- Press Council of India (PCI), New Delhi. Member.
- The Indian Newspaper Society (I.N.S.). President and member of executive committee.
- Syndicate and senate, Punjab University, Chandigarh. Member.
- Punjab Urdu Academy, Patiala. Member.
- Syndicate and senate, Guru Nanak Dev University, Amritsar. Member.
- Editors' guild of India. Member.
- Organising committee first Indo-Pak Punjab Games. Member. (2005).
- Urdu Press. Committee of the national council for promotion of Urdu language. Member.
- State advisory board for the department of languages, Patiala. Member.
- Punjab legal services authority. Member.
- Pushpa Gujral science city. Member.
- Shri Baba Harballabh Sangeet Mahasabha. Member.
- North India Printers Association. Foundation president.
- Jalandhar printers' association. President.
- R.B. Sewak Ram Maternity Hospital. Trustee.
- K. L. Saigal Memorial Trust. Trustee.
- Rajan Memorial Trust, Jalandhar. Trustee.
- Jalandhar district cricket association. Patron.
- Shri Ram Navmi Utsav Committee, Jalandhar. President.
- Jalandhar Senior Citizen Council (Regd.), Jalandhar, Chief patron.
- Local managing committee, D.A.V. College, Jalandhar. Member.
- Local managing committee, D.A.V. Institute of Physiotherapy & Rehabilitation, Jalandhar.
- Local managing committee, Dayanand Ayurvedic College, Jalandhar. Member.
- Himotkarsh and Lala Jagat Narain Girls College Shiksha Samiti (Regd.), Una. Patron.
- National committee for commemoration of the ter-centenary of the Guru-Ta-Gaddi celebrations, Nanded. (2008).
- Punjab Gowshalla Mahasangh (Regd.), Gowshalla, Sangrur. Chief Patron.
- Amritsar Sewa Samiti (Regd.), Amritsar, Khuh Suniarian, Amritsar. Patron.
- Akhil Bhartiya Valmiki Shakti Dal (Regd.), Delhi. Chief patron.
- "Shaheed Parivar Fund". This fund has raised over INR 111.6 million for dependants of victims of terrorism. Over 99 functions have been held. 7,667 families have benefited from UTI certificates to a value of INR 89,141,122.
- Other donations.
