= Hawala scandal =

1991–1997 Indian political scandal

The Hawala scandal, also called the Jain Diaries case or the hawala scam, was an Indian political and financial scandal involving payments allegedly sent by politicians (black money) through four hawala brokers, namely the Jain brothers. It was a US$18 million bribery scandal that implicated some of the country's leading politicians.

The Jain Hawala story was broken by two Delhi-based journalists Ram Bahadur Rai and Rajesh Joshi, working for the Hindi daily Jansatta, and then by Vineet Narain, a journalist who filed a public interest litigation in the Supreme Court of India.

== Events ==
In 1991, an arrest linked to militants in Kashmir led to a raid on hawala brokers, revealing evidence of large-scale payments to national politicians. On 25 March 1991, as per the court proceedings published by the Supreme court of India, Ashfak Hussain Lone, a person alleged to be an official of the terrorist organisation Hizbul Mujahideen, was arrested in Delhi. During his interrogation, the police learnt that his organisation was funded through hawala, using Surendra Kumar Jain and his family as a conduit. Based on this and further information received during Lone's interrogation, the Central Bureau of Investigation (CBI) conducted raids on the premises of Surendra Kumar Jain, his brothers, relatives and businesses. During the raids, the CBI seized Indian and foreign currency, two diaries and two note books at the premises. These diaries contained detailed accounts of vast payments made to people, identified only by initials, who were high ranking politicians, both in power and out of power, and of high ranking bureaucrats. At this stage, the investigation stopped at the CBI and neither the Jains, nor the contents of their diaries were investigated. Meanwhile, officers of the CBI involved in the investigation were transferred to other places by orders from ruling politicians. However, the case continued to make headlines in the news media, as it was pursued by a few journalists.

On 4 October 1993, writ petitions were filed in the Supreme court of India, on public interest under Article 32 of the Indian Constitution. They contained allegations that Government agencies like the CBI and the revenue authorities had failed to perform their duties and legal obligations as they had "failed to investigate matters arising out of the seizure of the "Jain diaries"; that the apprehension of terrorists had led to the discovery of financial support to them by clandestine and illegal means using tainted funds obtained through 'hawala' transactions; that this had also disclosed a nexus between politicians, bureaucrats and criminals, who were recipients of money from unlawful sources, given for unlawful consideration that the CBI and other Government agencies had failed to investigate the matter, take it to its logical conclusion and prosecute all persons who were found to have committed an offence; that this was done with a view to protect the persons involved, who were very influential and powerful; that the matter disclosed a nexus between crime and corruption at high places in public life and it posed a serious threat to the integrity, security and economy of the nation; that probity in public life, the rule of law and the preservation of democracy required that the Government agencies compelled to duly perform their legal obligations and to proceed in accordance with law against every person involved, irrespective of where he was placed in the political hierarchy." In India, the Hawala method is an illegal method of transacting in foreign currency. It is illegal and contentious due to two reasons. Firstly, it is highly secretive as it does not reveal the identity of people on either side of the transaction, even to the hawala operators. Secondly, it violates the FERA regulations of India as it does not use approved channels of regular banks for foreign currency transactions. However, it is often used in India for two reasons. Firstly, to transfer legally earned salaries (example: by ordinary workers overseas in Saudi Arabia and UAE) to their hometowns, as hawala transaction costs are a fraction of banks, and hawala operators can be found in the smallest villages of India. Secondly, by politicians, bureaucrats and nefarious elements to transfer corruption money.

== Discovery of involvement of politicians ==
Those accused included L. K. Advani, V. C. Shukla, Devi Lal, Sharad Yadav, Balram Jakhar, and Madan Lal Khurana. and an entrepreneur from Hyderabad Anwar Alvi.The list contained politicians from multiple political parties including BJP, INC, SJP and Janata Dal, and one independent, with amounts varying between Rs. 50,000 to Rs. 7.5 crore. The prosecution that followed was partly prompted by a public interest petition (see Vineet Narain), but the court cases of the Hawala scandal eventually all collapsed without convictions. Many were acquitted in 1997 and 1998, partly because the hawala records (including diaries) were judged in court to be inadequate as the main evidence. The Central Bureau of Investigation's role was criticized. In concluding the Vineet Narain case, the Supreme Court of India directed that the Central Vigilance Commission should be given a supervisory role over the CBI.

L. K. Advani resigned as MP in 1996 because of the scandal, before being re-elected in 1998. Later in June 2015 he said, "I quit over Hawala because I listened to my conscience". This statement was seen as a "veiled message" to Lalit Modi to also take moral responsibility over Modigate scandal.

== Supreme court decision ==
The Supreme Court proceedings did not relate to the hawala case per se but rather to the suspicious transfer of the CBI Director Joginder Singh and the rampant misuse of political power to curb the investigations of the CBI and Revenue department. In its judgment, delivered on 18 December 1997, the court, through Judges S.P. Bharucha and S.C. Sen, gave a ruling consisting of a 26 points list of pronouncements, the most important of which made it impossible for politicians in the government to remove the Director of the CBI for 2 years, thus ensuring that the CBI and its officers would have freedom to carry out their work without political interference.

== Sources ==
- Vineet Narain, 1999, Corruption, Terrorism and Hawala Scandal in Hindi ebook
- Kapoor, S. (1996), Bad Money, Bad Politics: The Untold Hawala Story, Har–Anand Publications, Delhi - cited (p. 22) by Ashok V. Desai in The Economics and Politics of Transition to an Open Market Economy: India, OECD Working Paper 155 accessed at https://doi.org/10.1787/487223334520 16 October 2026
- Hawala. An Informal Payment System and Its Use to Finance Terrorism by Sebastian R. Müller (Dec. 2006), ISBN 3-86550-656-9
