= Dayanand College, Ajmer =

College in Rajasthan

Coordinates: 26.4242615°N 74.6343472°E

Dayanand College
- Established: 1888; 1942 (as college)
- Students: 2,300
- Location: Ajmer, Rajasthan, India
- Website: www.davajmer.org

Dayanand College is a college in Ajmer, Rajasthan, India, that was established in 1887 in form of a Pathshala (School) through the efforts of Karmaveer Pt. Jiyalal and Prof. Dattatreya Vable. In July 1942, it became a college. After Dayanana Anglo-Vedic College (DAV) in Lahore was closed, this college became the oldest Dayanand College run by Arya Samaj Shiksha Sabha. Dayanand College is affiliated with Maharshi Dayanand Saraswati University, Ajmer.

== Education format ==
The College imparts education in five faculties: Arts, Science, Commerce, Agriculture and Physical Education. There are facilities for research (in various subjects at Ph.D. level) and qualified Professors, that are available. Dayanand College has a research institute called Dayanand Vedic Shodha Peeth. Such research institutes are only established in universities. Further, an Indira Gandhi National Open University (IGNOU) Study Centre has been established on campus. in which facilities for the study of 30 subjects at MBA and B.Ed. level are available.

== Features ==
Laboratories for students of the agricultural sciences, the farmland and a working dairy farm are also on site, so that students gain practical knowledge and the skills of their subjects.

For students of Physical Education, the College boasts a swimming pool, gymnasium complex, a large well-maintained sports fields and a 400-meter cinder track. Such facilities stand out as unique in the region. Besides developing the intellectual capacity of its 2,300 students, training is also imparted under National Service Scheme (N.S.S.) to 200 students and also in National Cadet Corps (N.C.C.) Army, Navy and Artillery to 500 cadets. There are two residential hostels for students.

== See also ==
- Dayanand Anglo-Vedic College Trust and Management Society
- Arya Samaj
