= Chiranji Lal Sharma =

Indian politician (1923–2011)

Chiranji Lal Sharma (23 September 1923 – 12 December 2011) was a member of 7th Lok Sabha from Karnal (Lok Sabha constituency) in Haryana State, India. He was elected to 8th, 9th and 10th Lok Sabha from Karnal. He was born in Ahulana, District Sonepat, Haryana. He died in Gurgaon in 2011, aged 88.
