= Babiyal =

- Census town
- Location in Haryana, India Babiyal (India)
- Coordinates: 30.35628°N 76.86882°E
- Country: India
- State: Haryana
- District: Ambala

Population (2001)
  - Total: 21,650

Languages
  - Official: Hindi
- Time zone: UTC+5:30 (IST)
- ISO 3166 code: IN-HR
- Vehicle registration: HR
- Website: haryana.gov.in

Babiyal is a census town in Ambala district in the state of Haryana, India.

== Demographics ==
As of 2001 India census, Babiyal had a population of 21,650. Males constitute 52% of the population and females 48%. About 12% of the population is under 6 years of age.
