= Jagmohan Anand =

Indian politician (born 1969)

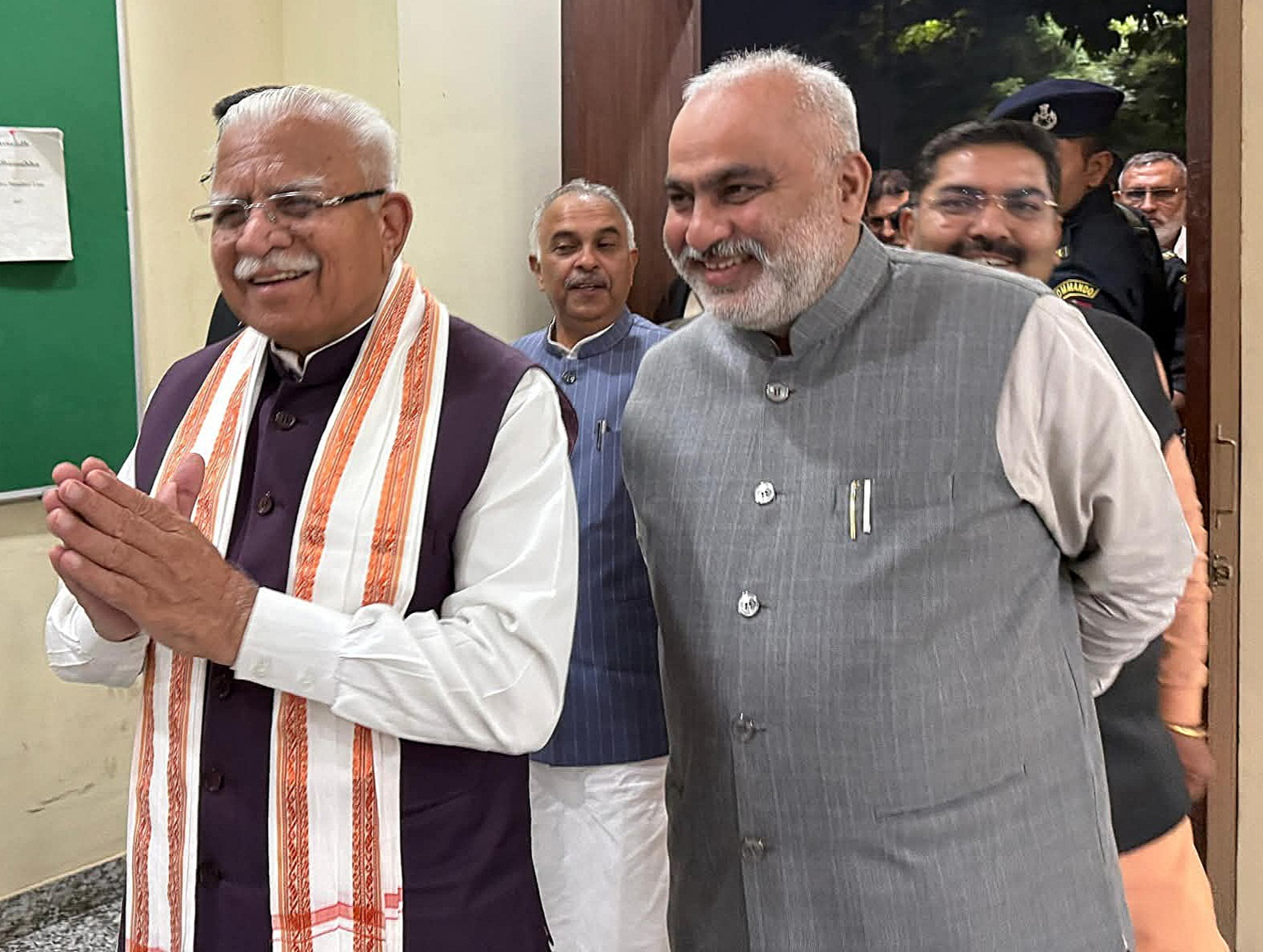
- Anand in 2025 with Manohar Lal Khattar

Member of the Haryana Legislative Assembly
- Incumbent
- Assumed office 8 October 2024
- Preceded by: Nayab Singh Saini
- Constituency: Karnal

Personal details
- Born: 30 November 1969 (age 56) Karnal, Haryana, India
- Party: Bharatiya Janata Party
- Spouse: Rekha Anand (social activist)
- Profession: Politician and businessman

Jagmohan Anand (born 30 November 1969) is an Indian politician from Haryana. He is a Member of the Haryana Legislative Assembly since 2024, representing Karnal Assembly constituency as a Member of the Bharatiya Janata Party. He has also formerly served as the District Council president of Karnal District and as a media coordinator to the former Chief Minister of Haryana Manohar Lal Khattar

== Businessman ==
Jagmohan Anand's profession according to the election affidavit filed with the Election Commission of India, and as analysed by the Association for Democratic Reforms (ADR) for the Haryana Assembly elections 2024 is Promotor Director in Kaysons Oils Pvt. Ltd.

== See also ==
- 2024 Haryana Legislative Assembly election
- Haryana Legislative Assembly
