= DAV College, Abohar =

Coordinates: 30.1339178°N 74.2082031°E

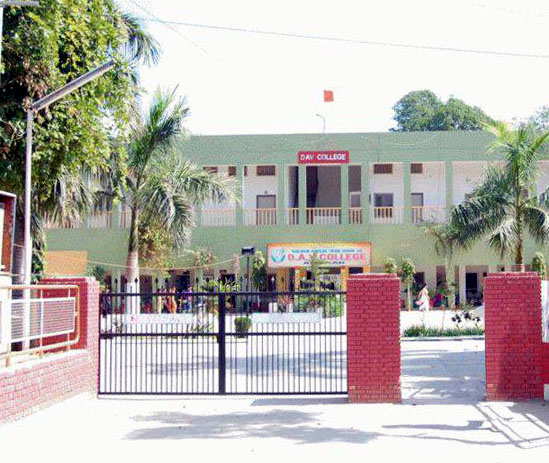
DAV College Photo by Yogesh

DAV College, Abohar is a post graduate college in the city of Abohar, Punjab, India. It is spread over 20 acres of land on Hanumangarh Road.

== History ==
DAV College, Abohar was established in 1960 under the aegis of the DAV College Managing Committee, New Delhi. The first principal of this college was N. D. Grover. The institution is affiliated to Panjab University, Chandigarh. Currently, Rajesh Mahajan is the principal of the college, who received the All India Mahatma Hans Raj Best Principal award from by Pawan Bansal, the Union Minister for Parliamentary Affairs and Water Resources, and Padma Bhushan G. P. Chopra, President, D.A.V. College Managing Committee, New Delhi.

The college building contains hostels, auditorium, library, play ground and 'yajna-shala'.

=== Notable events ===
- In March 1982, 8th Speaker of the Lok Sabha Balram Jakhar visited as Chief Guest in an annual function.
- In March 2012, Pawan Bansal, Union Minister for Parliamentary affairs visited as Chief Guest in an annual function.

=== Notable alumni ===
- Prem Chand Chauhan (Retd DIG-BSF)
- Shekhar Gurera (Editorial Cartoonist)
- Ashoo Punjabi (Punjabi Singer)
- Santosh Snehi Mann (DHJS)
- Suneet Arora (Director, Producer)

Prem Singhmar was student of premedical in 1996 and he is settled in Canada

=== NAAC Accreditation ===
The college secured an 'A' grade in a recent accreditation by NAAC. It managed to score a 3.06 CGPA.
