= Lala Jagat Narain =

Indian journalist

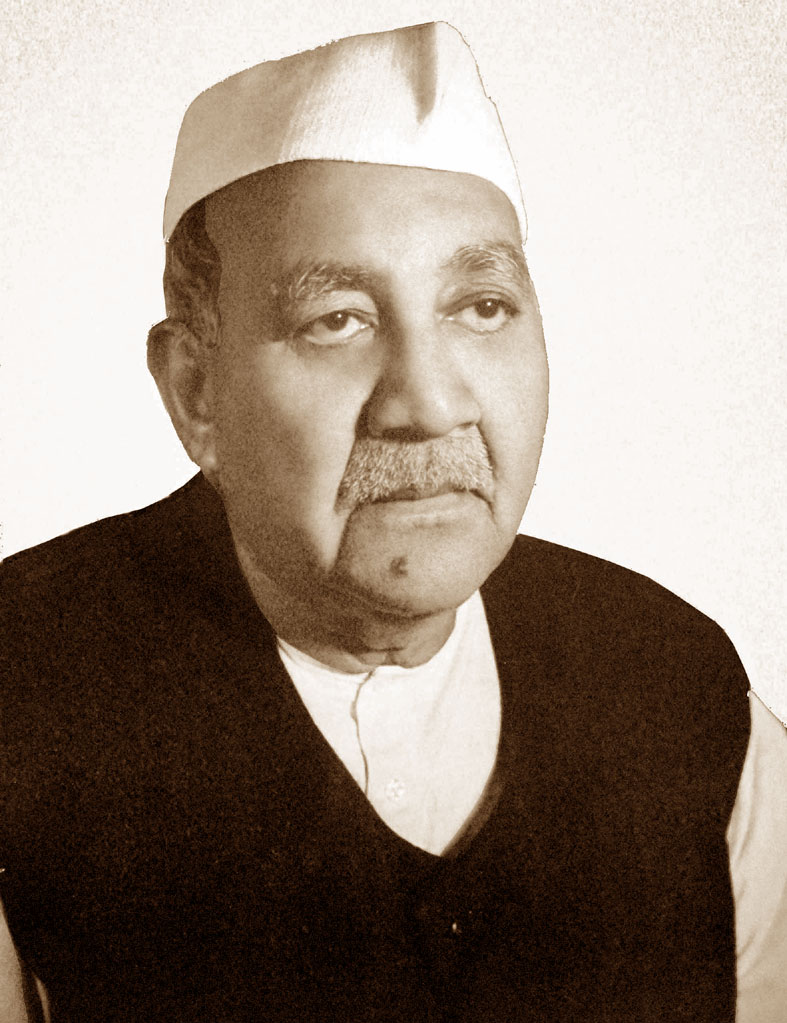
- Portrait of Lala Jagat Narain

Personal details
- Born: 31 May 1899 Wazirabad, Gujranwala District, British India
- Died: 9 September 1981 (aged 82) Jullundur, Punjab
- Spouse: Shanti Devi
- Children: 2 sons and 8 daughters: Romesh Chander, Vijay Kumar Chopra, Sudershan Trehan,
- Education: DAV College, Lahore; Law College, Lahore

Lala Jagat Narain (31 May 1899 − 9 September 1981) was an Indian editor, member of the Punjab Legislative Assembly, Member of Parliament and founder of the Hind Samachar media group.

== Early life ==
Lala Jagat Narain was born at Wazirabad, Gujranwala District (now in Pakistan) in 1899. He graduated from D.A.V. College, Lahore in 1919, and joined the Law College, Lahore.

== Establishment ==
He left his studies in 1920 at the call of Mahatma Gandhi to join the Non-cooperation movement. He was sentenced to two and a half years imprisonment. In jail, he acted as Lala Lajpat Rai's personal secretary.

In 1924 he became the editor of Bhai Parmanand's weekly Hindi language paper Akashvani. He participated in the Satyagraha movement and was in jail for about nine years on different occasions. His wife was in jail for six months and his eldest son, Ramesh Chandra, was arrested during the Quit India movement.

== Political life ==
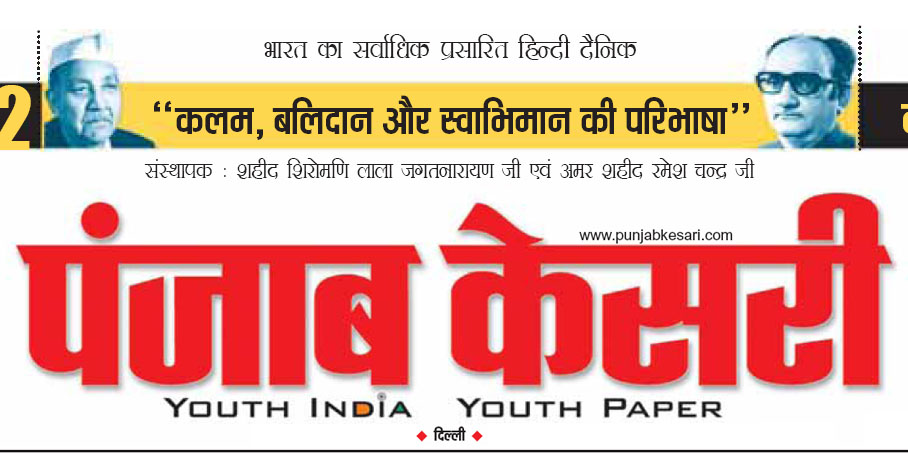
Punjab Kesari, header with the founders Lala Jagat Narain & Romesh Chander)

Narain was President of the Lahore City Congress Committee for seven years, leader of the Congress Party in the Lahore Corporation, a member of the Punjab Provincial Congress Committee for more than thirty years and member of the All-India Congress Committee for about 30 years.

Lala Jagat Narain was detained under MISA during Indira Gandhi's Emergency which was later on revoked on 4 January 1977. Following this incident, he parted ways with the party.

Narain had come to Jalandhar as a refugee from Lahore and started an Urdu daily, Hind Samachar in 1948. Urdu then was the language of the salaried urban men of Punjab, the people who could afford the time and money for a newspaper. But Urdu in independent India lacked government support. In 1965, he founded Punjab Kesari, a Hindi-language daily.

During the Punjabi Suba movement, he had resigned as minister in protest when the Regional Formula, a proposition to give the Punjabi and Hindi languages equal status in Punjab that the Akali Dal had provisionally accepted, had been implemented in 1956. He would periodically opine when the Akalis and the government would appear to make progress on the issue of Punjab statehood, stating once that "the Hindus of Punjab would never accept the settlement."

An Arya Samaji widely known for anti-Sikh communalism, Narain had urged Hindus in Punjab to reply to disown Punjabi as their mother tongue. His paper played a significant role in "fanning the flames of communal hatred between Hindus and Sikhs," and the Hindi press based in Jalandhar consistently vilified Sikhs, without making any distinction between Sikh groups.

After the Punjabi Suba was nevertheless established, he would later denounce the Anandpur Sahib Resolution which sought to rectify perceived injustices in water allotment and state powers and development following its formation; he and other Arya Samaj leaders and editors like Virendra would continue to communalize demands for the welfare of the entire state of Punjab, which would be further pursued during the Dharam Yudh Morcha. Again presuming to speak on behalf of the state's Hindus, he would assert in an article in the Indian Express that the primarily urban Hindu population in the state had nothing to do with the continuing state-center dispute over the proportionally unequal distribution of river waters, disregarding the influence on the state's economy of the water allotment amount, and in turn its social cohesion.

== Death and aftermath ==
Jagat was a critic of the Khalistan movement and had survived an assassination attempt in January 1981. On 9 September 1981, Narain was shot dead by a two-man team of assassins. Nachhatar Singh Rode, was arrested at the scene of the crime. Dalbir Singh and Swaran Singh Rode are two others accused in the case.

Jarnail Singh Bhindranwale, who had accused Narain of portraying the Sikh gurus as "lovers of wine and women" in his newspapers in spite of protests, was implicated in the assassination, though it was the Dal Khalsa which had likely committed it. An Indian Airlines plane would be hijacked by them on 29 September 1981 to demand his release, with no casualties.

In 1981, Bhindranwale remained inside Gurudwara Gurdarshan Parkash at Mehta Chowk, but was persuaded to surrender on 20 September 1981. For 25 days, violence exploded all over Punjab, while Bhindranwale was jailed in Circuit House.

India's Union Home Minister, Giani Zail Singh, announced to Parliament that there was no evidence that Bhindranwale was involved in Lala Jagat Narain's assassination, and was released on 15 October 1981.

On 10 July 1984, The White Paper on violence in Punjab issued by the government of India mentioned that Narain was assassinated because of his criticism of Bhindrawale. He was present during the clash that occurred between the Sant Nirankaris and Akhand Kirtani Jatha members, and stood witness at the Karnal trial against Bhindrawale.

== Legacy ==
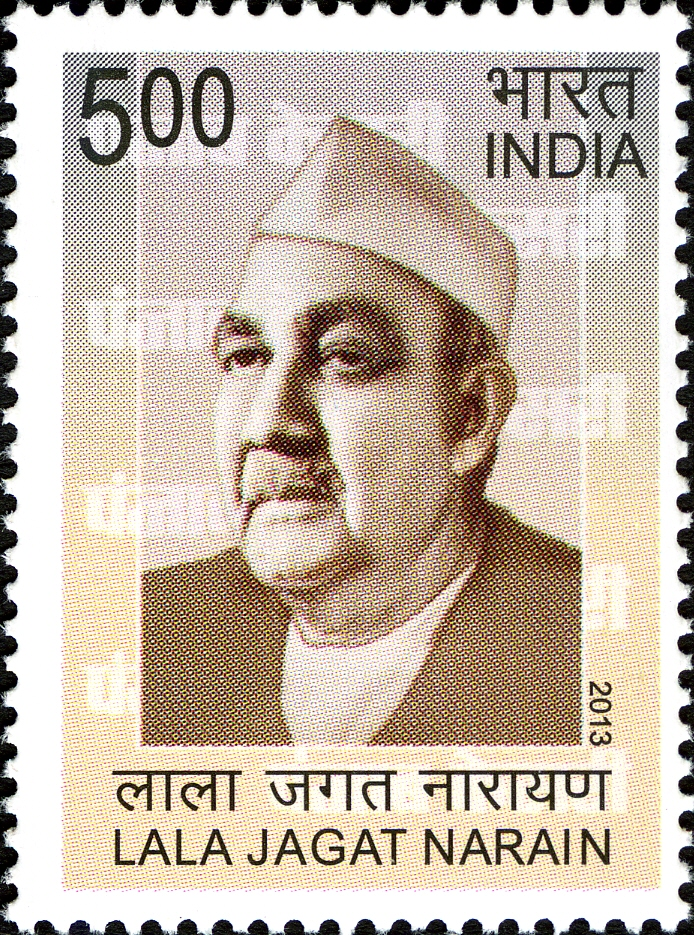
Jagat Narain on a 2013 stamp of India

H.K. Dua, a former Editor-in-Chief of The Tribune, praised Narain's Hind Samachar Group for standing up against terrorism pointing out that 62 of his staff were gunned down over a period of time.

A chair in the name of Narain was established at Kurukshetra University in 1998.

On 9 September 2013, Prime Minister Manmohan Singh released a postage stamp in memory of Jagat Narain.
