= Nava Bharat =

Hindi-language daily newspaper

NavaBharat
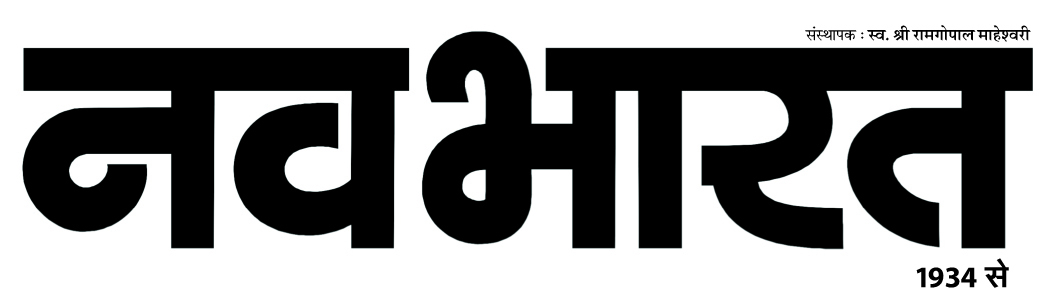

- Type: Daily newspaper
- Format: Broadsheet
- Owner: Ram Gopal Investments Pvt. Ltd.
- Founder: Ramgopal Maheshwari
- Publisher: NavaBharat Media Group
- Founded: 1934
- Political alignment: Liberal
- Language: Hindi
- Headquarters: Nagpur, Bhopal, Raipur.
- Circulation: 17,75,450
- Sister newspapers: Central Chronicle, NavaRashtra
- Website: https://navbharatlive.com/
- Free online archives: epaper.navbharatlive.com www.navarashtra.com

Nava Bharat (lit. 'The New India') is a Hindi-language daily newspaper published through 14 editions from the states of Maharashtra, Madhya Pradesh, and Chhattisgarh. Founded in 1934, Navabharat has the sixth highest readership according to Indian Readership Survey ('09 R1) in India amongst Hindi newspapers. With its sister newspapers Central Chronicle and Navarashtra, published in English and Marathi respectively, Navabharat has three supplements: Suruchi, Glamour, and Awakash.

== History ==
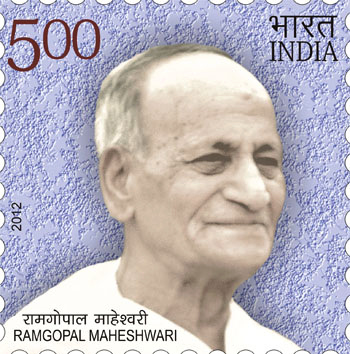
Ramgopal Maheshwari on a 2012 stamp of India

Nava Bharat was launched on 8 February 1934 by Shri Ramgopal Maheshwari (1911–1999), a Gandhian freedom fighter, journalist, and promoter of Hindi language. Maheshwari served as its Editor-in-Chief for 65 years. It started as a bi-weekly publication in Nagpur, and soon became a daily newspaper; Navabharat has set its boundaries to different parts of the country. The bi-weekly since its inception have participated in the freedom movement and bore the brunt of the British Government. In 1942 during 'Quit India Movement' Navabharat risked its existence for its extensive coverage. During this period, the police and secret services kept a close watch on its activities, raided the press and also imprisoned the founder.

Navabharat commemorated the launch of its Jabalpur edition in the year 1950. In the mid nineteenth century, Navabharat launched its Bhopal, Raipur and Indore editions. The 1980s and 1990s saw the launch of a Bilaspur edition in Chhattisgarh, of a Gwalior edition in Madhya Pradesh, and of Pune, Satara and Mumbai editions in Maharashtra.

== Navarashtra ==
Navabharat added another majorly spoken language in their bout with their Marathi daily 'Navarashtra' in the year 2000 from the central India. Navarashtra now gets published from three centers Nagpur, Mumbai and Pune along with many other rural areas. Navarashtra has 9 hyper local editions as well and 3 supplements Gunjan, Mayuri and Kshitij.

== Navbharat Live ==
Navabharat has played a significant role in strengthening Hindi journalism in Central India. For the past nine decades, this institution has been actively engaging with its readers through its Hindi and Marathi newspapers. Thanks to its credibility, factual reporting, and comprehensive coverage, Navabharat has established itself as a trusted brand among readers.

Navabharat has also established a strong digital presence among readers. Today, Navbharat Live is one of the leading Hindi news websites in India and Maharashtra. We are known for providing our readers with the latest and accurate news. Navbharat Live offers the latest news from across the country and the world, including political, sports, entertainment, social, and economic updates, as well as interesting and important information on topics such as health and technology.

To further enhance access to our readers, we are also present on platforms such as Facebook, X, Instagram, and YouTube. Navbharat Live's mission is not only to provide news, but also to empower readers and connect them with various aspects of society, politics, and culture.

In addition, the Navbharat Live website also offers special reporting and analytical angle-based content that helps you understand the reality behind events. For more information and the latest updates, visit the official Navbharat Live website

== Central Chronicle ==
The English daily of Navabharat Media group known as Central Chronicle was started from Bhopal in 1957. Central Chronicle started expanding in the post-independence era. In 1984, the Central Chronicle's Bilaspur and Raipur editions were launched.

== Digital presence ==
Navabharat entered the digital world so that the news reaches their readers on time with their convenience. They started publishing E-Papers for Navabharat and Navarashtra as substitutes for the print copy. Navabharat and Navarashtra also have their separate Web Portal. They also have three applications namely Navabharat Shorts, Navabharat App and Navarashtra App which are available for both the iOS & Android devices. Navabharat and Navarashtra are available on the social media platforms like Facebook, Twitter, Instagram, Pinterest and YouTube.

== Social initiatives ==
An organisation must never ignore its responsibilities towards society and should take necessary steps for the benefit of society. Like many other newspapers Navabharat, has also undertaken some responsibilities and social initiatives to create awareness in the society. Latur earthquake caused the firm to organize a relief camp in order to provide food and shelter to the victims of the disaster. Also in the year 1991 when the Mowad flood in Nagpur district, affected thousands of lives, as a part of social responsibility, the organization allied funds and contributed to the affected to rebuild their houses and start all over again. Navabharat to create awareness in the society conducted health checkup camps free of cost for every class of the society. Navabharat also conducted zero load shedding where they helped to solve the load shedding issues which were faced by the people of Nagpur. Many other initiatives and campaigns were conducted by the organization such as the 'No Parking Board', Healthy Mornings, Wall graffiti, Zero Mile Campaign, and Swachh Nagpur Sundar Nagpur have turned out to be great examples of social responsibility and awareness among the society.

== Community networks ==
Navabharat provides a platform to the communities to come together and connect. This has resulted in the genesis of Suruchi, Gurukul, Second Innings, Gen Nex & Udaan. Community networks help people to come together.

== Editions ==
NavaBharat is published from the following places:

- Bhopal
- Gwalior
- Jabalpur
- Indore
- Satna
- Chhindwara
- Nagpur
- Mumbai
- Pune
- Nasik
- Raipur
- Bilaspur
- Amravati
- Chandrapur
