= Central Chronicle =

Indian newspaper

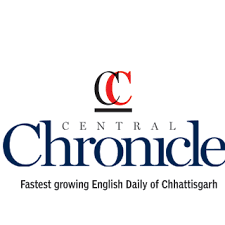
- Type: Daily newspaper, News Website
- Format: Broadsheet
- Owner: Ram Gopal Investments Pvt. Ltd.
- Publisher: Kishore Trivedi
- Editor: Sameer Shukla (Chhattisgarh edition); Sameer Diwan (City editor)
- Founded: 1957
- Political alignment: Liberal
- Language: English
- Headquarters: Bhopal, Raipur
- Circulation: 27081
- Sister newspapers: Nava Bharat; NavaRashtra
- Website: centralchronicle.in

Central Chronicle is an English-language daily regional newspaper being published from Bhopal, Madhya Pradesh and Raipur, Chhattisgarh. The newspaper publishes about central India, containing a mix of local and national news. The original name of Central Chronicle was MP Chronicle when Madhya Pradesh and Chhattisgarh were one state. After 1 November 2000 it was changed to Central Chronicle when Raipur went to the parted state Chhattisgarh.

== Editions ==
Central Chronicle is published from the following places:

- Bhopal (Since 1957)
- Raipur (Since 1974)
