= Balbir Punj =

Indian journalist and political worker (1949–2026)

Former Member of Parliament, Rajya Sabha
- In office 2000–2006
- Constituency: Uttar Pradesh
- In office 2008–2014
- Constituency: Odisha

Personal details
- Born: 2 October 1949 Lalowal, East Punjab, India
- Died: 18 April 2026 (aged 76)
- Party: BJP
- Spouse: Shashibala Punj
- Children: 2
- Website: https://balbirpunj.in/
- As of 22 November, 2010

Balbir Punj (2 October 1949 – 18 April 2026) was an Indian journalist and columnist who wrote on events in Hindi-English newspapers and magazines from the early 1990s. He specialised in writing about social, economic and political issues.

Punj started his career in journalism for the publication Motherland in 1971. He worked for Financial Express from 1974 to 1996. He then worked for The Observer of Business and Politics (a business daily published from Delhi and Mumbai) as an Executive Editor from May 1996 to March 2000. He was also chairman of the IIMC, a Southeast Asian media training organization, for two years until March 2000. Punj also participated in the Delhi Journalists Association, where he served as President for two consecutive terms between 1989 and 1991. In 1993–95, Punj worked as the General Secretary of the National Union of Journalists (NUJ). He was chairman of the National Commission for Youth. He was also a member of the Delhi Finance Commission established by the then Delhi Government in 1996–97.

On 18 May 2022, Punj was conferred the Lifelong Devrishi Narad Samman Award.

== Columnist ==
Punj wrote columns in the National English & Hindi Daily and Indian weekly magazine. He later wrote a regular column for the daily newspaper Punjab Kesari, Dainik Jagran, Amar Ujala and a bunch of other regional papers. In English dailies, he occasionally wrote for Hindustan Times, The Indian Express and "ThePrint". Until some time ago, Balbir Punj was also writing for years in “The New Indian Express”, Asian Age, Mail Today (India Today), and Outlook.

== Political career ==
Punj was a columnist and an active political worker. He was a member of Rajya Sabha for two terms. Punj was Bharatiya Janata Party (BJP)'s Rajya Sabha MP from Uttar Pradesh from 2000 to 2006. In 2008, Balbir Punj was again elected a member of Rajya Sabha from Odisha and retired in 2014. He was the convener of the Intellectual Cell of the BJP for a decade, helping the party chart its ideological course. Punj was also chairman of the National Commission for Youth (Minister of State status). On 31 March 2013, he was promoted as one of the Vice Presidents of the Bharatiya Janata Party (BJP). Punj has served BJP party as its national secretary, and as in charge of several states, including Gujarat, Punjab, Kerala and Himachal Pradesh. Member of BJP's National Executive from 2000 to 2014. He was a board member (Non-Official) of Bishweshwar Prasad Koirala India-Nepal Foundation (BPKF) under Ministry of External Affairs, India since July 2017. He is described as a close associate of the Rashtriya Swayamsevak Sangh. Punj was also seen on news channels debating issues.

== Death ==
Punj died on 18 April 2026, at the age of 76.
