= Vineet Narain =

Indian journalist (born 1956)

Vineet Narain (born 1956) is an Indian journalist, anti-corruption activist and conservator of heritage. His exposure of the 1990s Jain Hawala scandal led him to use a public interest petition to apply pressure on the Central Bureau of Investigation. The CBI was widely criticised when its prosecutions collapsed, and the Supreme Court of India in deciding the Vineet Narain Case made directions that included new supervision of the CBI by the Central Vigilance Commission.

== Family and early life ==
Born in 1956 in a Brajwasi family, Vineet Narain had his primary education in Western Uttar Pradesh and did his higher studies from Jawaharlal Nehru University in New Delhi. His father was an academician and served as the Vice-Chancellor of two prominent universities in U.P. He fought against interference of the political masters in the admission procedure of some of the professional courses in the state. His mother, a Gandhian social worker and highly spiritual person, was active in students politics at the Lucknow University in 1950s. She gave values of social commitment to her children.

Narain is married to Dr. Meeta Narain who is Professor of Russian language at the Jawaharlal Nehru University, New Delhi. In 2019, she was awarded the prestigious Pushkin Medal for her contribution to Russian Literature and Language. He has two sons Azeez Narain and Eeshit Narain.

Narain was drawn to social work from his early youth. He worked in a village at the age of 18 years with an NGO.

== Started independent Hindi TV Journalism in India ==
In 1980s he anchored Yuv Manch a youth TV show on government controlled only TV channel i.e. Doordarshan. In 1986–87 he anchored the first ever investigative TV show on Doordarshan, titled Sach Ki Parchain and created nationwide ripples with his bold exposés of the failures of government policies at the grass root level. Soon as a protest against editorial interference from the Govt. he decided to sacrifice his TV career at its prime. A magazine TV & Video World reported, "It may sound surprising, but men of principles, willing to take tough stand and unwilling to compromise on basic ideals, still exist in our society. When, in April 1987, one of his programmes in the Sach Ki Parchhain series was arbitrarily stopped by Doordarshan authorities, its producer, TV and newspaper journalist Vineet Narain vowed never to present anything on the government-controlled network until it was made autonomous and functioned more democratically.

In 1989 he launched the first Hindi-language video news magazine 1989 named Kalchakra and repeatedly shook the nation with his bold reports. As a consequence he faced several hurdles from the government controlled Film Censor Board. In those days pre-censorship was a must for this first ever independent Hindi TV news. In 1990 Narain challenged this law in the Delhi High Court and led a nationwide campaign for the independence of TV news in India.

== Hawala Scam ==
After exposing the Terrorists and politicians Hawala network, as early as in 1993, he approached the apex court of India demanding honest probe in this case. The now known Jain Hawala Case got a momentary boost up as a result of a PIL (Public Interest Litigation) filed in the Supreme Court in 1993 by Narain. In 1996 for the first time in Indian history, several Cabinet Ministers, Chief Ministers, Governors and Leaders of Opposition besides bureaucrats were charge-sheeted for corruption. Several landmark decisions were passed by the Supreme Court of India in the Vineet Narain Vs Union of India, which have also been criticised.

In July 1997, Mr. Narain compelled the Chief Justice of India to reveal what was happening behind the scene to hush up this high-profile case. CJI's revelations caused major uproar in the parliament, Bar and media. Narain wrote a book in Hindi on this case titled 'Bhrashtachar Atankvaad and Hawala Karobar'(Corruption, Terrorism and Hawala Business')

=== Insulating the CBI ===
As a fallout of the PIL by Narain, the Supreme Court of India ruled that the Director of the CBI should be appointed on the recommendations of a committee headed by the Central Vigilance Commissioner, the Home Secretary and the Secretary in the Department of Personnel as members. The committee should also take the opinion of the incumbent Director CBI before forwarding their recommendations to the Appointments Committee of the Cabinet.

== Fight against corruption in Indian Judiciary ==
Narain brought out a series of land scams involving the sitting chief justices of India. As a result, contempt of court proceedings were initiated against him not in Delhi but in J&K. He remained underground for 18 months (2000–2001) before finally fleeing the country. No one from the Bar, Parliament or media showed the courage to stand by him due to the fear of Contempt of Court Act. He got support from various international organisations later on such as Committee to Protect Journalists, Human Rights Watch and other media organisations from all over the world but he did not return till that CJI retired. He has also written a volcanic book in Hindi on this crusade titled 'Adalat Ki Avmanana Kanoon ka Durupyog' Misuse of Contempt of Courts Act

== TV Journalism in India ==
He launched Kalchakra, the first Hindi-language video magazine, in 1989. He faced hurdles due to financial crisis and by the government controlled censor board. He writes a weekly syndicated column in several regional daily newspapers.

Earlier he worked as a correspondent of national dailies and has appeared in programmes on several international television networks. He began investigative TV journalism in 1980. TV & Video World reported, "It may sound surprising, but men of principles, willing to take tough stand and unwilling to compromise on basic ideals, still exist in our society. When, in April 1987, one of his programmes in the Sach Ki Parchhain series was arbitrarily stopped by Doordarshan authorities, its producer, TV and newspaper journalist Vineet Narain vowed never to present anything on the government-controlled network until it was made autonomous and functioned more democratically." He has been honoured by the life membership of International Film And Television Club of Asian Academy of Film & Television.

== Current Activities ==
Vineet Narain writes a syndicated column in over 22 national dailies on a weekly basis. Vineet Narain gives a weekly news report from India on telephone to SBS Radio, Australia and also contributes to weekly columns in two dozen popular dailies of India.

Through Kalchakra Investigative News Bureau, he, along with his associates, undertake investigative journalism in India. He is also the founder Secretary of People's Vigilance Commission, a group headed by J F Ribeiro, Ex-DGP, Punjab. Narain has been involved in the wider restoration works in Braj.

He also supported T N Seshan's Deshbhakta Trust, but later resigned after objecting to Seshan tried to seek funds from corrupt persons and dubious companies.
