= Mahmood Shaam =

Pakistani journalist

Mahmood Shaam محمود شام
- Born: Tariq Mehmood; 5 February 1940 (age 86)
- Education: B.A, M.A in Philosophy
- Occupations: Journalist, poet
- Awards: Pride of Performance Award in 2010 by the President of Pakistan

Mahmood Shaam (Urdu: محمود شام), born Tariq Mahmood (Urdu: طارق محمود) on 5 February 1940, is a Pakistani Urdu language journalist, poet, writer and news analyst.

After serving Pakistan's largest newspaper Jang Group for more than 16 years as Group Editor, he joined ARY Digital Group on 21 September 2010 to launch a new Urdu language newspaper. He has written many books on different subjects.

== Early life ==
Mahmood Shaam received his bachelor's degree in English literature, Persian and Philosophy from Government College Jhang in 1962. In 1964, he obtained a master's degree in philosophy from Government College Lahore. He was the editor of the college magazine Ravi.

Shaam has visited several countries during his journalistic career including the United Kingdom, Singapore, Burma, Denmark, Sri Lanka, Saudi Arabia, Sweden, Malaysia, Switzerland, Syria, Qatar, Egypt, Italy, United Arab Emirates, India and Canada.

== Career ==
=== As journalist ===
Mahmood Shaam has worked for almost 45 years as a journalist including 16 years with Jang Group of Newspapers. He has written 20 books including poetry books.

In his journalistic career, he has interviewed many national and international leaders like Yasir Arafat, Zulfikar Ali Bhutto, Indira Gandhi, Sheikh Mujibur Rahman, Gerald Ford, Henry Kissinger, Tun Abdul Razak, Benazir Bhutto, Pervez Musharraf, Abdul Ghaffar Khan, G.M. Syed, Khan Abdul Wali Khan, Maulana Bhashani, Mufti Mahmood, Asghar Khan and Ghulam Mustafa Jatoi.

=== Designations ===
He has worked as;

Assistant Editor Qandeel (magazine), Lahore, (1962–1964)

Magazine Editor Daily "Nawa-i-Waqt" Lahore, (1965–1967)

Editor Weekly "Akhbar-e-Jahan" Karachi, (1967–1970) and (1972–1975)

Special Correspondent for Sindh for Daily "Musawat" Lahore, (Jul 1970 – Apr 1972)

Editor/Publisher: Weekly "Mayar" Karachi, (Apr 1976 – 1978) & (1980–1994)

In January 2018, Mahmood Shaam who, for a long time, had edited the Urdu language newspaper Daily Jang returned to work for the Jang Group of Newspapers. He had quit the Jang Group in 2012 to pursue other interests.

== Bibliography ==
Poetry

- Aune-paune ghazlein baicheen, nazmaun ka bewpaar kiya
- Cardio Spasm (A Long Poem) 1969
- Akhri Raqs (Last Dance) 1971
- Chehra Chehra Meri Kahani (My Story on Every Face) 1975
- Nawishta-e-Dewar (Writings on Wall) 1980
- Qurbanion Ka Mausam (The Season of Sacrifices) 1991
- Mohallon Mein Sarhadein (Frontiers within Streets) 1999
- Ayyan Ayyan Yo Yo, Urdu poems for children
- Bas ek apne hi qadmon ki chhaap suntan hoon

Other books

- Roo ba Roo (Face to Face)
- Larkana Se Peking (Larkana to Peking ) 1972
- Larkana to Peking 1973
- Kitna Qareeb Kitna Door (So Near So Far) 1974, A travelogue
- Bhutto Key Akhri Ayyam (The Last Days of Bhutto) 1979
- Nai Awazen (New Voices) 1987, Interview with emerging leaders
- Benazir Bhutto – The Way Out 1988
- Benazir Bhutto – Ek Hi Rasta 1988
- Bartania Mein Khizaan (The English Autumn) 1992, Travelogue
- Taqdeer Badalti Taqreerain (Speeches that Changed Destiny) 1993
- Khawateen-o-Hazraat (Ladies and Gentlemen) 1998
- Shab-ba-Kher (Good Night) 1999, A political novel
- Roo ba Roo (Face to Face), New Edition – Interviews from 1967 to 1977
- One to One, Interviews from 1977 to 2002
- Bharat Mein Black List (Black Listed in India)
- Amrica Kia Soch Raha Hai (Urdu), American visit after 9/11
- Visiting American Mind – English Version
- Mumlikat Aey Mumlikat 2007
- Pakistan Per Qurban, The day with Benazir Bhutto (1970 to 2007)
- Indifference in the time of extremism (2017)

== Awards and recognition ==
- Pride of Performance Award by the President of Pakistan in 2010

== See also ==
- List of Pakistani journalists
- List of Pakistani poets
- List of Urdu language poets
- List of Pakistani writers
- List of Urdu language writers
