= Bale =

Bale may refer to:

== Packaging ==
- Cotton bale
- Hay or straw bale in farming, bound by a baler
- Paper bale, a unit of paper measurement equal to ten reams
- Wool bale, a standard-sized and -weighted pack of classed wool

== Places ==
- Bale Zone in Oromia Region, Ethiopia
  - Bale Mountains
- Bale Province, Ethiopia, a former province
- Bale (historical region), former geographic region in Northeast Africa
- Sultanate of Bale, a former Muslim sultanate
- Bale, Poland
- Bale, Konjic, Bosnia and Herzegovina, a village
- Bale, Croatia, a settlement and municipality
- Bale, Norfolk, England, a village
- Balé Province, Burkina Faso
- Basel, Switzerland, a city whose French name is Bâle

== Other uses ==
- Bale (name), a list of people with that name
- Bale baronets, an extinct title in the Baronetage of England
- Bale Messenger, an Iranian instant messaging app
- Bail (jewelry), also spelled bale, a component of certain types of jewelry, mostly necklaces
- A variant breed or type of Abyssinian horse

== See also ==
- Bale shrew, a species endemic to the Bale Mountains of Ethiopia
- Akar-Bale language, an extinct Great Andamanese language of India
- Baal (disambiguation)
- Bail (disambiguation)
- Bales, surname
- Baale (disambiguation)
- Bale Pandiya (disambiguation)
