= Bail (disambiguation) =

Bail is the conditional release of an arrested person prior to their trial, or the money or property used as security that the person will appear at trial.

Bail may also refer to:

== People ==
- Alex Bail (1900–1973), American radical and union leader
- Charles Bail, director and co-screenwriter of the 1976 comedy film The Gumball Rally
- Grace Shattuck Bail (1898–1996), American composer, poet and teacher
- Murray Bail (born 1941), Australian writer of novels, short stories and non-fiction
- Paul Bail (born 1965), English cricketer
- René Bail (1931–2007), Canadian director, cinematographer and actor
- Rohan Bail (born 1988), Australian rules footballer

== Objects ==
- Bail (cricket), one of the two wooden crosspieces that rest on top of the stumps to form a wicket in cricket
- Bail (jewelry), a component of certain types of jewelry, mostly necklaces
- Bail handle or bail, a hooped handle of a bucket or kettle
- Bail or flip-top closure on jars or bottles

== Other uses ==
- Bail Organa, a Star Wars character
- Bail, an animal stall for milking cows
- "Bail", a song by Arcángel from the album Sentimiento, Elegancia y Más Maldad (2023)
- Bail up, Australian term for detention by a bushranger
- Bail (film), an Indian action crime drama

== See also ==
- Baal (disambiguation)
- Bael (disambiguation)
- Bale (disambiguation)
- Clovis Le Bail (born 1995), French rugby union player
- Bailing (disambiguation)
- Bailout (disambiguation)
