= Bhalla =

Bhalla may refer to:

- Bhalla, Karnal in Haryana, India
- Bhalla (food), a snack from India
- Bhalla, Jammu and Kashmir, a village in Jammu and Kashmir
- Bhallaladeva, fictional character in the Indian Baahubali media franchise

== People ==
=== Historical figures ===
- Guru Amar Das (born Amar Das Bhalla, 1479–1574), Punjabi saint and third Sikh Guru
- Mata Bhani (born Bhani Bhalla, 1535–1598), Punjabi saint and daughter of Guru Amar Das
- Bhai Gurdas (born Gurdas Bhalla, 1551–1636), Sikh writer, historian, preacher and official
- Sumer Singh (1847–1903), Sikh historian, writer, poet and teacher; descendant of Guru Amar Das

=== Modern people ===
- Ajay Kumar Bhalla (born 1960), Indian bureaucrat and administrator
- Amit Bhalla (born 1991), known by his stage name Ninja, Indian singer
- Anil Kumar Bhalla, Indian transplant surgeon
- Ashima Bhalla (born 1983), Indian actress
- Attin Bhalla, Indian actor
- Deepti Omchery Bhalla (born 1957), Indian dancer
- Gopi Bhalla (born 1968), Indian actor
- Guneeta Singh Bhalla, Indian-American physicist and historian
- Gyan Bhalla (born 1910), Indian sprinter
- Harbans Bhalla (1930–1993), Indian writer
- Jagadish Bhalla (1948–2019), Indian judge
- Jaswinder Bhalla (1960–2025), Indian comedian and actor
- Pukhraj Bhalla (born 1994), Indian actor and singer
- Needhi Bhalla, American biologist
- Raman Bhalla, Indian politician
- Ravinder Bhalla (born 1974), American civil rights lawyer and politician
- Rhetesh Bhalla (born 1982), American wrestler
- Sanjay Bhalla, Indian admiral
- Sheila Bhalla (1933–2021), Canadian-Indian labor economist and trade union adviser
- Surjit Bhalla, Indian economist and writer
- Tashi Bhalla (born 1984), Indian cricketer
- Upinder Singh Bhalla (born 1963), Indian computational neuroscientist and professor
- Vikas Bhalla (born 1972), Indian actor and producer

== See also ==
- Bhaal (disambiguation)
- Veera Ballala (disambiguation)
