= Baal (disambiguation) =

Baal is a Semitic term for "Lord" or "owner".

Baal may also refer to:

== Religion ==
- Baal (demon), a Christian demon, loosely identified with the Canaanite god
- Baal Peor, a Canaanite deity
- Baal-berith, worshiped in ancient Canaan
- Baal-zebub or Beelzebub, a demon in some Abrahamic religions
- Hadad, a Canaanite deity commonly known as Baal or Ba'lu

== Places ==
- Baal, Germany, a village in the municipality of Hückelhoven
- Baal, Belgium, a village in the municipality of Tremelo
- Baal, Netherlands, a hamlet in the Dutch province Gelderland

== People ==
- Baal I, 7th-century BC king of Tyre
- Baal Shem Tov (1698–1760), Jewish mystical rabbi
- Baal HaTanya (1745–1812), Orthodox Rabbi
- Baal Müller (born 1969), German writer and publisher
- Adam Muraszko (stage name Baal), Czech/Polish heavy metal musician
- Georges Baal (1938–2013), Hungarian writer
- Johann Baal (1657–1701), German composer
- Karin Baal (1940–2024), German film actress
- Loïc Baal (born 1992), French footballer
- Ludovic Baal (born 1986), French Guianese footballer

== Arts and entertainment ==
=== Characters and fictional entities ===
- Baal (comics), a Marvel Comics character
- Bhaal (Forgotten Realms), a fictional deity in the Dungeons & Dragons: Forgotten Realms novels and games
- Ba'al (Stargate), a fictional character in Stargate SG-1
- Ba'al, a character in Vampireology: The True History of the Fallen
- General Baal, a character of the video game Grandia
- Baal, a character in the Diablo series
- Baal, a character in the Disgaea series of games
- A fictional planet in the Warhammer 40,000 series
- Baal, a character in the video game Genshin Impact

=== Music ===
- Baal (opera), based on Brecht's play, by Friedrich Cerha (premiered 1981)
- Baal (band), a Danish rock band
- BAAL (Serbian band), a Serbian gothic rock band
- Baal (EP), a 1981 EP by David Bowie, featuring incidental music written for Brecht's play
- Baal: Book of Angels Volume 15, a 2010 album by the Ben Goldberg Quartet composed by John Zorn
- "Baäl", a song by Exuma from his 1970 album Exuma II
- Baal Records, a Singapore based record label

=== Other uses in arts and entertainment ===
- Baal (film), a 1970 German TV film, directed by Volker Schlöndorff and based on the play
- Baal (play), a 1918 play by Bertolt Brecht
- Baal (video game), a 1988 computer game for the Amiga
- Baal, a 1978 horror novel by Robert McCammon
- "BA'AL" the fifth episode of the first season of the tv series American Horror Stories, aired in 2021

== Other uses ==
- British Association for Applied Linguistics, a UK society for applied linguists
- Baal teshuva movement, worldwide movement among the Jewish people

== See also ==
- Baalah (disambiguation)
- Bhaal (disambiguation)
- Bael (disambiguation)
- Bal (disambiguation)
- Ball (disambiguation)
- Bail (disambiguation)
- Bale (disambiguation)
- Belus (disambiguation)
