= Bailing out =

Bailing out may refer to:

- Parachuting out of an aircraft in an emergency
- In rebreather scuba diving, a "bail out" is a backup breathing system for when the main breathing system fails; see Rebreather#Bailout
- In balance boarding, hastily jumping off the board; see Balance board#Playing the game: its tension

== See also ==
- Bail (disambiguation)
- Bale (disambiguation)
