= Locket =

Pendant that opens to hold a small item

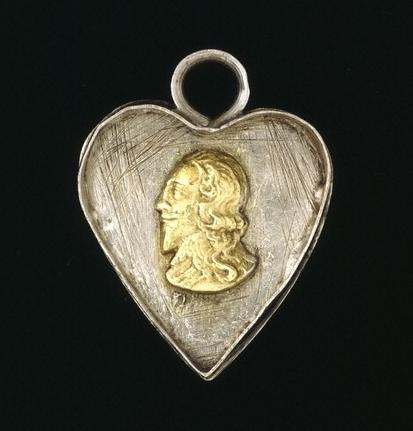
A late 17th-century locket, depicting the head of King Charles I (reigned 1625–1649)

A locket is a pendant that opens to reveal a space used for storing a photograph or other small items such as a lock of hair. Lockets are usually given as gifts during holidays and special occasions like Valentine's Day, christenings, weddings and --especially during the Victorian Age--funerals. Historically, they often opened to reveal a portrait miniature.

Lockets are generally worn on chains around the neck and often hold a photo of the person who gave the locket, or they could form part of a charm bracelet. They come in many shapes such as ovals, hearts, prisms and circles and are usually made of precious metals such as gold or silver befitting their status as decorative jewelry.

Lockets usually hold only one or two photographs, but some specially made lockets can hold up to eight. Common in the Victorian Era, 'spinner' lockets have a bail that attaches to the necklace chain is attached but not fixed to the locket itself which is free to spin. Around 1860, memento lockets started to replace mourning rings as the preferred style of mourning jewellery. British author Jilly Cooper reportedly wore a locket in which she kept a photograph of one of her mongrels after they died.

Keepsake lockets can also be made with a glass pane at the front so that what is inside can be seen without opening the locket. Such lockets are generally used for items like locks of hair which could fall out and become lost if the locket were repeatedly opened, whereas photograph lockets are generally enclosed on all sides and the photographs are secured by pieces of clear plastic.

Another kind of locket still made was in a filigree style with a small cushion in the centre to which a few drops of perfume should be added. Perfume lockets were popular in eras when personal hygiene was restricted and sweet smelling perfume was used to mask the odour of a person or their companions.

Very rare World War I- and World War II-era British and American military uniform locket buttons exist, containing miniature working compasses.

== See also ==
- Coin locket
- Stanhope (optical bijou)
