= Bansi (disambiguation) =

Bansi is a city in the Siddharthnagar district in the state of Uttar Pradesh, India.

Bansi may also refer to:

== Places ==
- Baansi, a village in southern Rajasthan, India; 96 km (60 mi) away from Udaipur and close to Chittorgarh
- Bansi, Nepal, a Village Development Committee in Dailekh District in the Bheri Zone of western-central Nepal
- Bangshi River, a river in central Bangladesh

== People ==
- Bansi Chandragupta (1924–1981), art director of Indian film industry
- Bansi Lal (1927–2006), political leader from the state of Haryana, India
- Bansilal Gurjar, Indian politician
- Bansilal Verma, Indian artist
- Bansi Kaul (1949–2021), Indian theatre director
- Bansi Pandit (born 1942), Indian writer and speaker on Hinduism
- Bansi Ponnappa, Indian military officer and UN peacekeeper
- Josef Quinteros (1976–2018), trance keyboardist from Barcelona, Spain, who produced under the name "Bansi"
- Anna Barbara Bansi (1777–1863), Swiss-born French painter
- Praz Bansi, British professional poker player

== Meteorology ==
- Cyclone Bansi, the second named tropical cyclone of the 2014–15 South-West Indian Ocean cyclone season

== See also ==
- Vamshi (disambiguation)
- Bansuri (disambiguation), an Indian flute
- Bangshi Badan Barman, Indian politician
- Bansilalpet Stepwell, Secunderabad, India
- Bansilal Ramnath Agarwal Charitable Trust's Vishwakarama Institute Of information technology, Pune, India
