= Kapuściaki =

Village in Gmina Mokobody, Poland

- Village
- Location within Poland
- Coordinates: 52°15′54″N 22°05′40″E
- Country: Poland
- Voivodeship: Masovian
- County: Siedlce
- Gmina: Mokobody

Kapuściaki [kapuɕˈt͡ɕaki] is a village in the administrative district of Gmina Mokobody, within Siedlce County, Masovian Voivodeship, in east-central Poland.
