= Męczyn-Kolonia =

Village in Gmina Mokobody, Poland

- Village
- Location within Poland
- Coordinates: 52°17′14″N 22°05′35″E
- Country: Poland
- Voivodeship: Masovian
- County: Siedlce
- Gmina: Mokobody

Męczyn-Kolonia [ˈmɛnt͡ʂɨn kɔˈlɔɲa] is a village in the administrative district of Gmina Mokobody, within Siedlce County, Masovian Voivodeship, in east-central Poland.
