= Panduvamshi =

Panduvamshi (IAST: Pāṇḍuvaṁśī, "descendants of Pandu") may refer to either of the following dynasties that ruled in Central India:

- Panduvamshis of Mekala
- Panduvamshis of Dakshina Kosala

== See also ==
- Pandu (disambiguation)
- Vamshi (disambiguation)
