= Pieńki, Gmina Mokobody =

Village in Gmina Mokobody, Poland

Pieńki
- Village
- Location within Poland
- Coordinates: 52°18′43″N 22°07′07″E
- Country: Poland
- Voivodeship: Masovian
- County: Siedlce
- Gmina: Mokobody

Pieńki [ˈpjɛɲki] is a village in the administrative district of Gmina Mokobody, within Siedlce County, Masovian Voivodeship, in east-central Poland.
