= Męczyn =

- Village
- Location within Poland
- Coordinates: 52°17′N 22°5′E
- Country: Poland
- Voivodeship: (Masovian Voivodeship) Masovian
- County: Siedlce
- Gmina: Mokobody

Męczyn [ˈmɛnt͡ʂɨn] is a village in the administrative district of Gmina Mokobody, within Siedlce County, Masovian Voivodeship, in east-central Poland.
