= Bhaal =

Bhaal may refer to:

- Bhaal (Forgotten Realms), a deity in the Forgotten Realms setting of Dungeons and Dragons
- the Bhal region of India

== See also ==
- Bhalla (disambiguation)
- Bhala, an Indian spear
- Baal (disambiguation), a term applied to deities in ancient Semitic religions
