= Zaliwie-Szpinki =

- Village
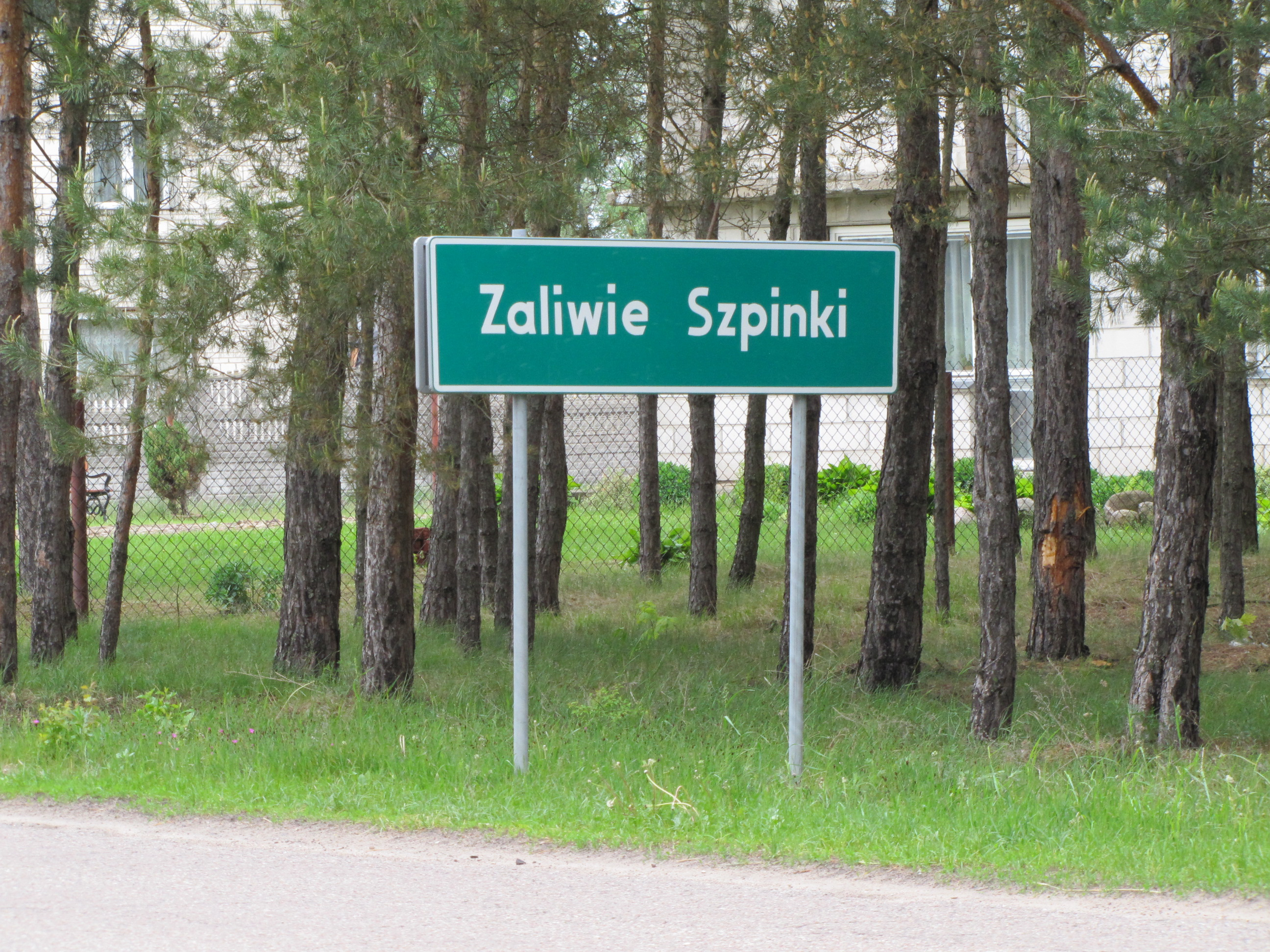

- Location within Poland
- Coordinates: 52°15′43″N 22°04′53″E
- Country: Poland
- Voivodeship: Masovian
- County: Siedlce
- Gmina: Mokobody

Zaliwie-Szpinki [zaˈlivjɛ ˈʂpiŋki] is a village in the administrative district of Gmina Mokobody, within Siedlce County, Masovian Voivodeship, in east-central Poland.
