= Wesoła, Siedlce County =

Wesoła
- Village
- Location within Poland
- Coordinates: 52°15′00″N 22°09′42″E
- Country: Poland
- Voivodeship: Masovian
- County: Siedlce
- Gmina: Mokobody

Wesoła [vɛˈsɔwa] is a village in the administrative district of Gmina Mokobody, within Siedlce County, Masovian Voivodeship, in east-central Poland.
