= Zemły =

- Village
- Location within Poland
- Coordinates: 52°18′34″N 22°07′39″E
- Country: Poland
- Voivodeship: Masovian
- County: Siedlce
- Gmina: Mokobody

Zemły [ˈzɛmwɨ] is a village in the administrative district of Gmina Mokobody, within Siedlce County, Masovian Voivodeship, in east-central Poland.
