= Zaliwie-Piegawki =

- Village
- Location within Poland
- Coordinates: 52°14′59″N 22°05′43″E
- Country: Poland
- Voivodeship: Masovian
- County: Siedlce
- Gmina: Mokobody

Zaliwie-Piegawki [zaˈlivjɛ pjɛˈɡafki] is a village in the administrative district of Gmina Mokobody, within Siedlce County, Masovian Voivodeship, in east-central Poland.
