= Księżpole-Jałmużny =

- Village
- Location within Poland
- Coordinates: 52°19′5″N 22°6′29″E
- Country: Poland
- Voivodeship: Masovian
- County: Siedlce
- Gmina: Mokobody
- Population: 110

Księżpole-Jałmużny [kɕɛ̃ʂˈpɔlɛ jau̯ˈmuʐnɨ] is a village in the administrative district of Gmina Mokobody, within Siedlce County, Masovian Voivodeship, located in east-central Poland.
