= Needhi Bhalla =

American biologist

- Born: United States
- Education: Columbia University (B.A.); University of California, San Francisco (Ph.D.)
- Children: 2
- Scientific career
- Workplaces: University of California, Santa Cruz
- Doctoral advisor: Andrew W. Murray
- Other academic advisors: Teri Melese; Abby Dernburg

Needhi Bhalla is an American biologist. She researches mitosis and meiosis in Caenorhabditis elegans. Bhalla is a professor at University of California, Santa Cruz.

== Early life and education ==
Needhi Bhalla was raised on the southern shore of Long Island near Queens. She was born into a Punjabi Khatri family who emigrated to the United States from India in the 1960s and 1970s for higher education opportunities. Bhalla's mother is a nutritionist and her father, a United States Air Force engineer.

In 1993, Bhalla worked as a summer intern with John Kornblum in the New York City Public Health Laboratories. In 1995, she graduated magna cum laude with a Bachelor of Arts from Columbia College (New York). One summer during her undergraduate studies, Bhalla researched in Teri Melese's lab at Columbia University where she learned of her interest in cell biology. Bhalla completed a Doctor of Philosophy at University of California, San Francisco in 2002. She completed her doctoral research in Andrew W. Murray's lab where she researched mitotic chromosome segregation in yeast. Bhalla researched meiosis in C. elegans during her postdoctoral studies in Abby Dernburg's lab at Lawrence Berkeley National Laboratory.

== Career ==
Bhalla worked as an assistant professor from 2008 to 2015 in the Department of Molecular, Cell and Developmental Biology at University of California, Santa Cruz. She became an associate professor in 2015, and was appointed to full professorship in 2019. Bhalla is on the working group of Mothers in Science which works to evaluate scientific conference guidelines to address barriers facing parents.

== Personal life ==
Bhalla has two sons.
