= Vamsi =

Vamshi, Vamsi or Vamsy may refer to:

== People ==
=== Given name ===
- Vamsi Krishna, Indian actor
- Vamsi Mootha, Indian-American physician-scientist
- Vamshi Paidipally (born 1979), Indian actor
- Vamsy (born 1956), Indian film director, writer and music director

=== Surname ===
- Krishna Vamsi, Indian film director
- Vakkantham Vamsi, Indian actor and screenwriter

== Other uses ==
- Bamboo flute (Sanscrit: vāṃśī)
  - Bansuri, an ancient side blown flute originating from India and Nepal
- Vamsi (film), a 2000 Indian Telugu-language film
- Vamshi (film), a 2008 Indian Kannada-language action drama film

== See also ==
- Bansi (disambiguation)
- Panduvamshi (disambiguation)
- Bansuri: The Flute, a 2021 Indian film
- The dictionary definition of वंशी at Sanskrit Wiktionary
