= Trade dollar =

Silver coins minted for trading purposes

Trade dollars were silver coins minted as trade coins by various countries to facilitate trade with countries in East Asia, especially China and Japan. They all approximated in weight and fineness to the Spanish dollar, which had set the standard for a de facto common currency for trade in the Far East.

== History ==
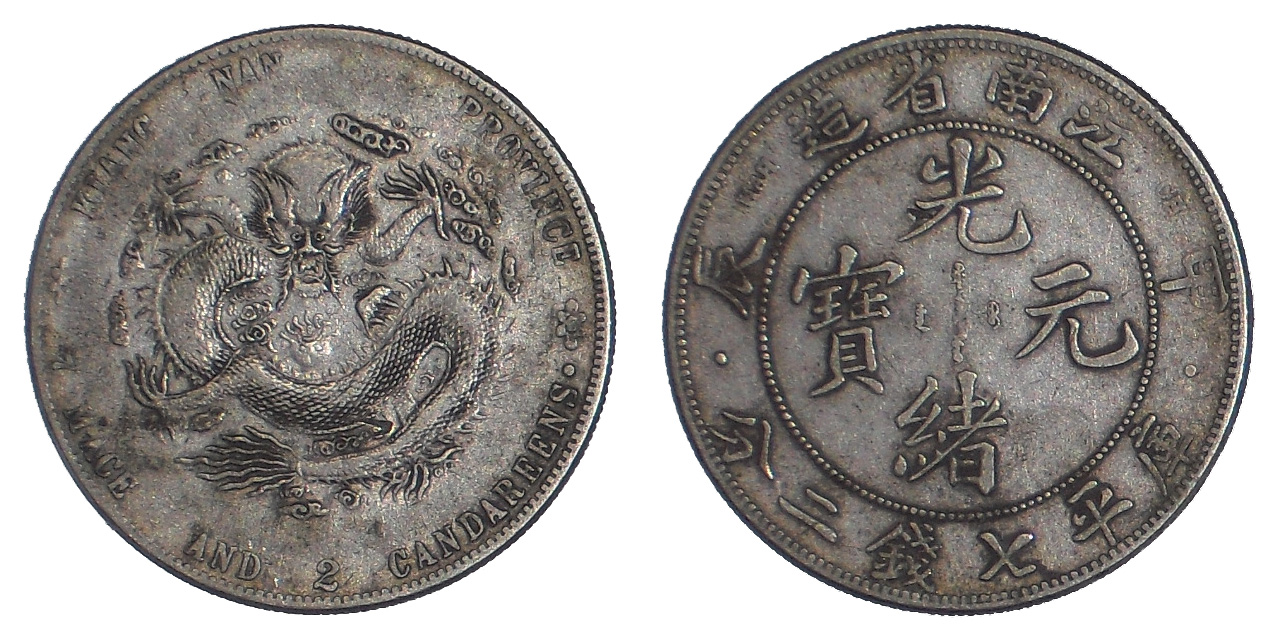
Chinese dragon dollar of 1904

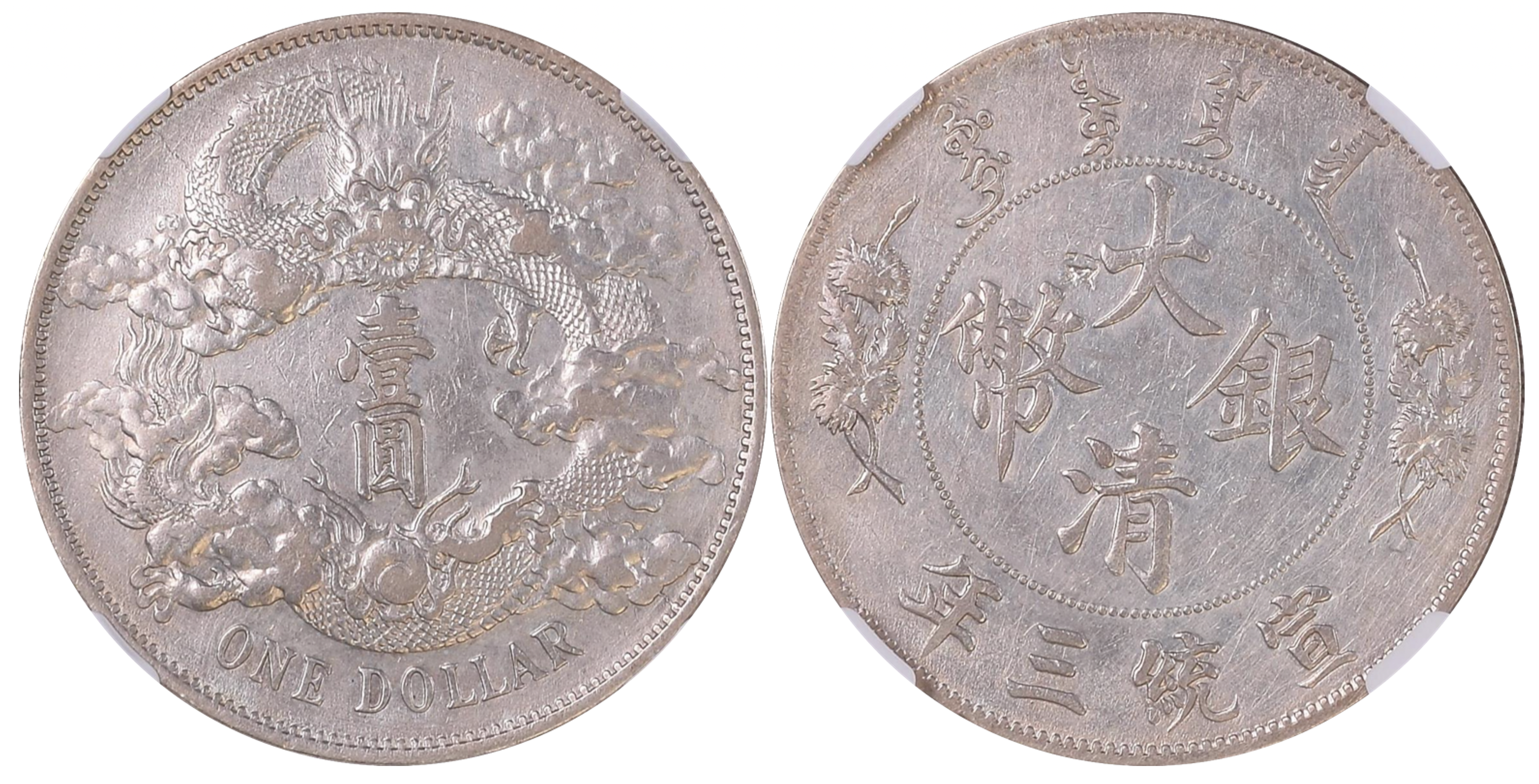
Silver coin: 1 yuan/dollar Xuantong 3rd year - 1911 Chopmark

The existence of trade dollars came about because of the popularity of the silver Spanish dollar in the Far East, such as in China, East Asia, and the East Indies. Following the establishment of Spanish Philippines, Manila (in the modern area of Intramuros) became an entrepôt for Chinese goods in one direction and Spanish silver dollar, from across the Pacific to the Spanish-held mints and silver mines of Mexico, Peru, and Bolivia, in the other. The Manila-Acapulco Galleon Trade, led from the 16th Century onwards to the wide circulation of "pieces of eight" as a standard of trade in the Far East.

The high regard in which these coins came to be held, led to the minting of the silver Chinese yuan, a coin designed to resemble the Spanish one. These Chinese "dragon dollars" not only circulated in China, but together with original coins of Spanish-Mexican origin became the preferred currency of trade between China and its neighbours. Defeated in the First Opium War, China was forced to open its ports to foreign trade, and in the late half of the 19th Century Western nations trading with China found it cheaper and more expedient to mint their own coins, from their own supplies of silver, than to continue to use coins from Mexican sources. These so-called trade dollars would approximate in specification, weight 7 mace and 2 candareens (approx. 27.2 grams; 7/8 troy ounce) and fineness .900 (90%), the Spanish-Mexican coins so long trusted and valued in China.

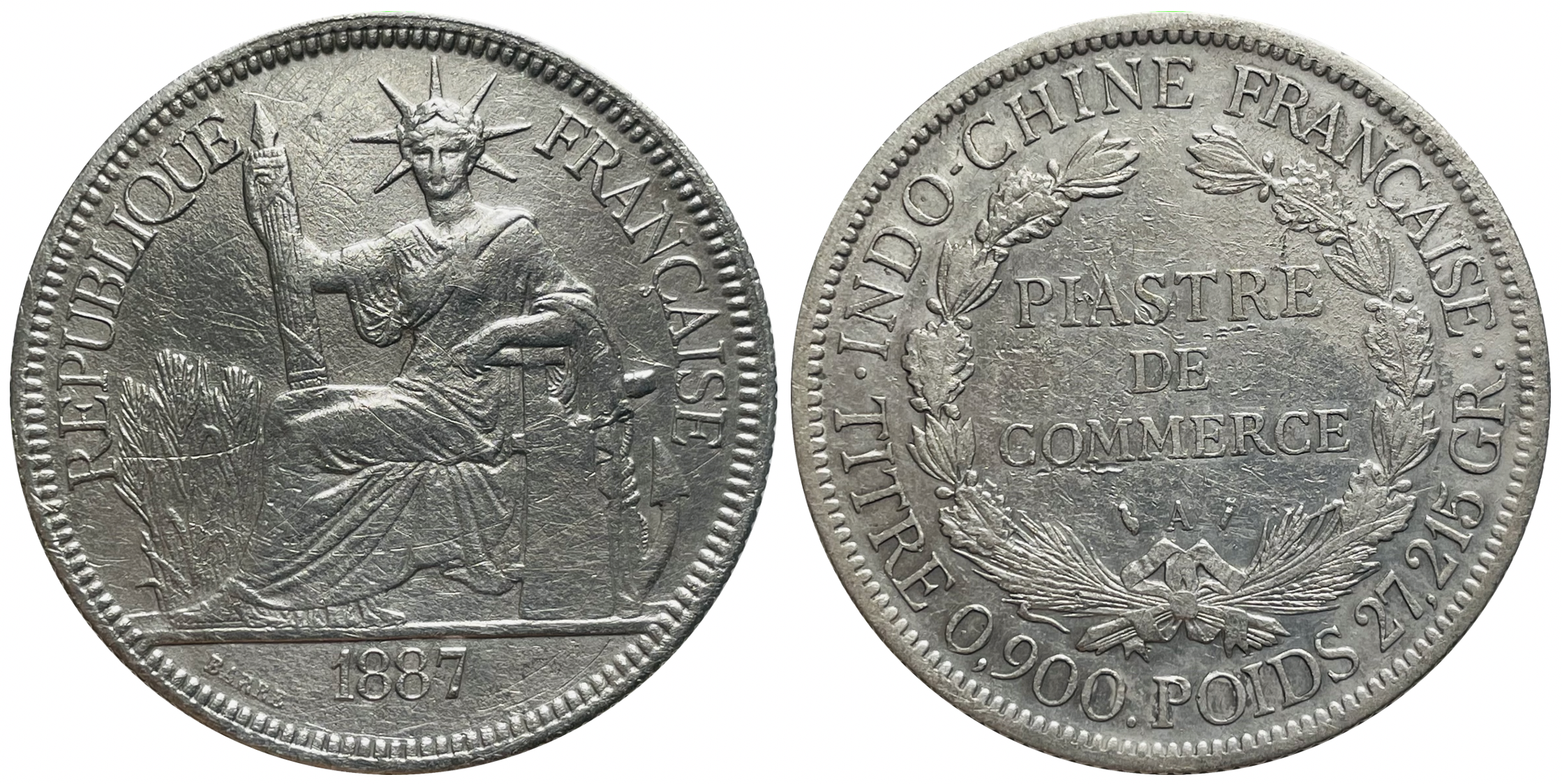
French Indochina Piastre 1887

=== France ===
To control the money supply in French Indochina in 1885, the French introduced a new silver Piastre de commerce and associated subsidiary coinage throughout the entire Indo-Chinese colonies in order to increase monetary stability. The piastre was initially equivalent to the Mexican peso. The piastre was therefore a direct lineal descendant of the Spanish pieces of eight that had been brought to the Orient from Mexico on the Manila Galleons. It was initially on a silver standard of 1 piastre = 24.4935 grams pure silver. This was reduced to 24.3 grams in 1895.

=== Japan ===
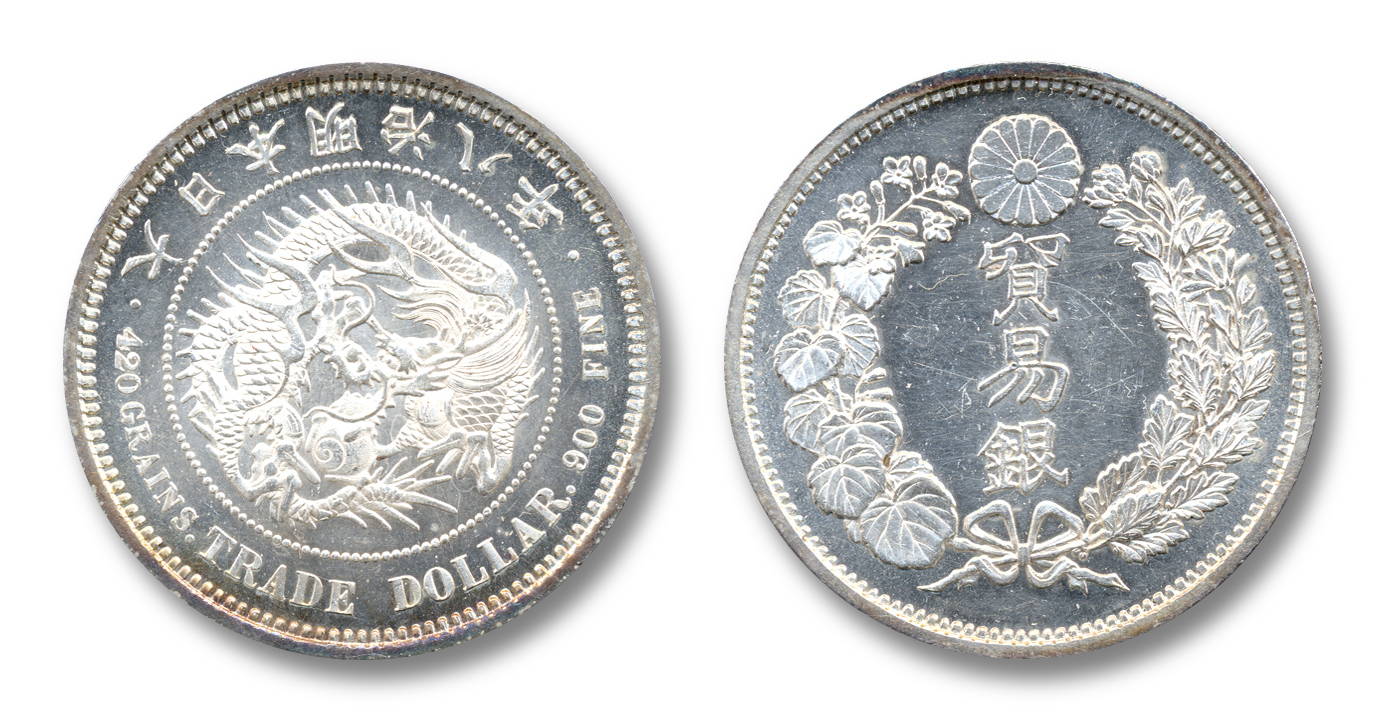
Japanese Trade Dollar dated 1875

The Japanese Trade Dollar was a dollar coin, issued from 1875 to 1877. It was minted of 27.22 g of silver with a fineness of .900 (90%). The Yen coin had 26.96 g of silver at that time, and otherwise nearly identical in design to the trade dollar.

2,736,000 coins of this type were minted, the vast majority in 1876-77. When Japan introduced the gold standard in 1897, the silver 1 yen coins, including the trade dollars, were demonetized. The majority of the trade dollars were counterstamped with the character "gin" (Japanese for "silver"). The Osaka mint placed the mark on the left side of the reverse, the Tokyo mint on the right. The coins were then released for use in Japanese-occupied Taiwan, Korea and Lüshunkou.

=== United Kingdom ===
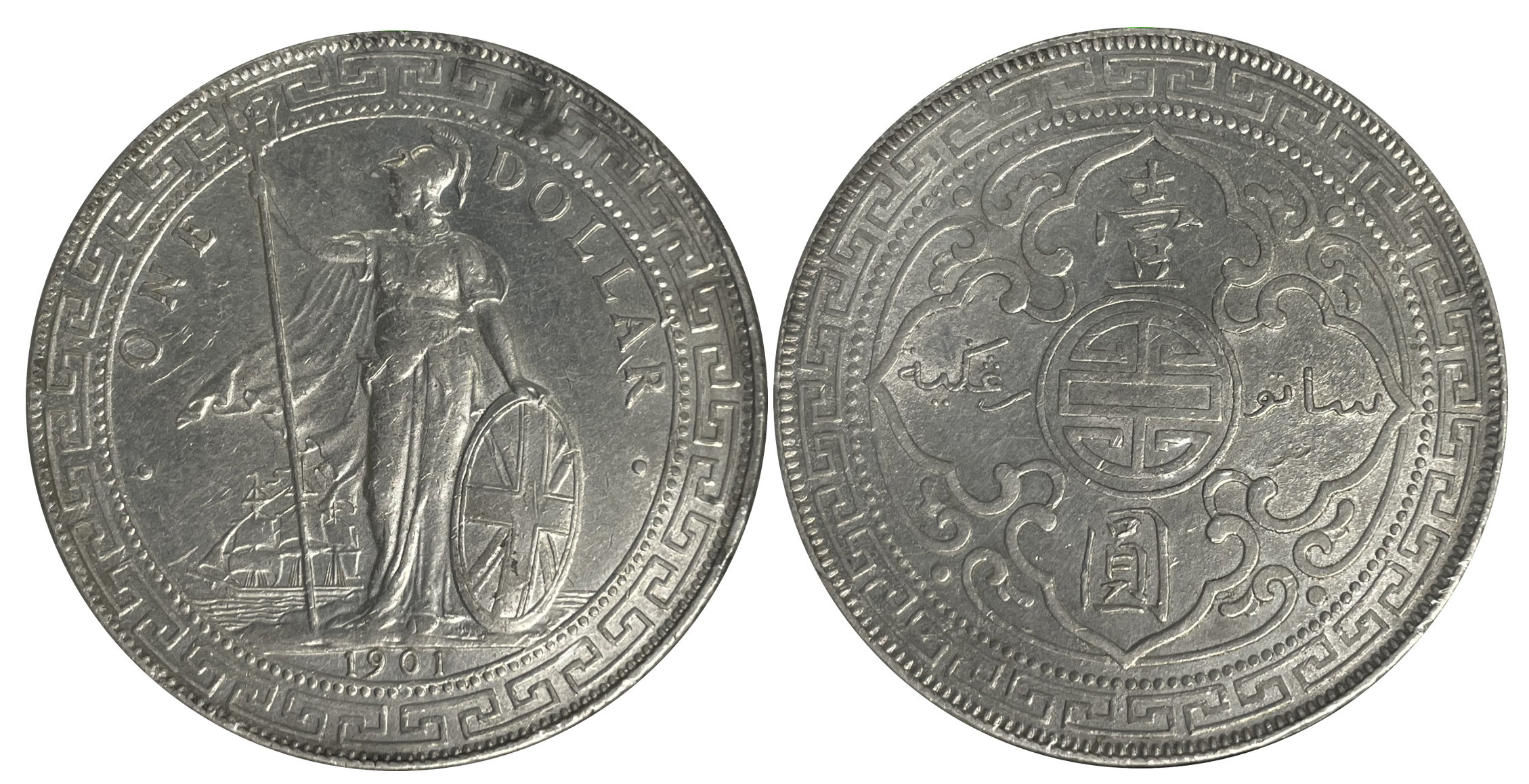
A Trade Dollar from the reign of Victoria. It is dated 1901 and minted at the Bombay mint.

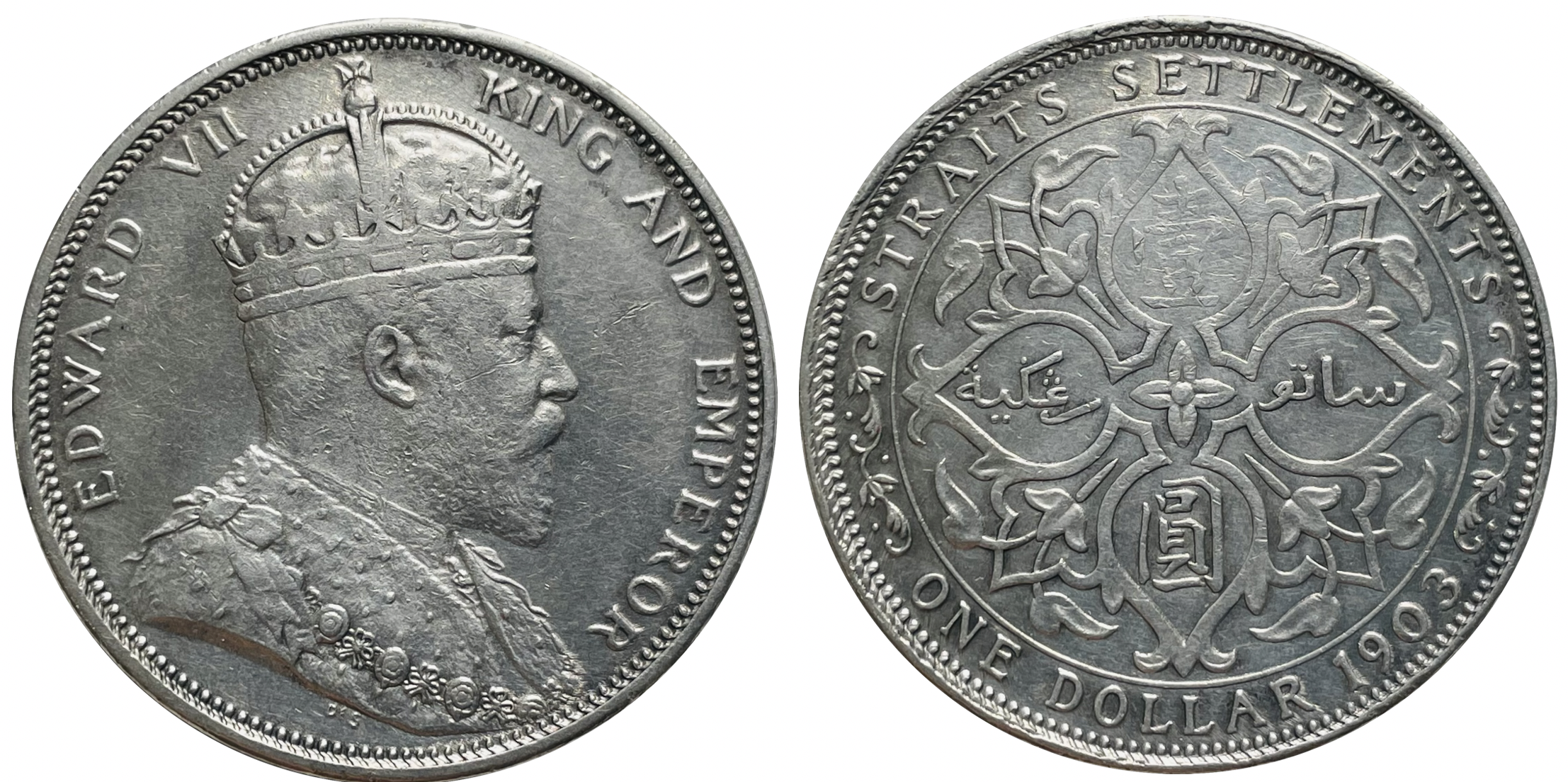
Silver coin: 1 Strait dollar, Edward VII, 1903

With the extension of British trading interests in the East, especially after the founding of Singapore in 1819 and Hong Kong in 1842, it became necessary to produce a special dollar so as to remove the reliance of a British Colony upon the various foreign coins then in circulation.

"China trade silver dollars" were a direct result of the First (1839–1842) and Second Opium War (1856–1860), which broke out when Chinese authorities tried to stop Britain from smuggling opium into the country. The loser, China, had to open up a number of ports to British trade and residence, and cede Hong Kong to Britain. In the decades that followed, merchants and adventurers flocked to these areas, and international trade flourished. Foreign banks were established and large silver coins from all over the world began arriving to pay for tea, silk and Chinese porcelain to be shipped abroad. These .900 fine silver trade dollars were then circulated throughout China, where they were readily accepted as a medium of exchange. The British trade dollar, minted exclusively for use in the Far East, depicts Britannia standing on the shore, holding a trident in one hand and balancing a British shield in the other, with a merchant ship under full sail in the background. On the reverse is an arabesque design with the Chinese symbol for longevity in the center, and the denomination in two languages – Chinese and Jawi Malay.

The British trade dollar was designed by George William De Saulles and minted from 1895 for Hong Kong and the Straits Settlements. But after the Straits dollar was introduced to the Straits Settlements in 1903, it became exclusively a Hong Kong coin produced until 1935. Those with the mint mark "B" were produced at the Bombay Mint; others, marked "C", were struck in Calcutta. Those with no mint mark were produced in London. The mint mark "C" can be found in the ground between the left foot of Britannia and the base of the shield, while the mint mark "B" is located in the center prong of the trident. The 1921-B dollar was struck but never released for circulation, and only a limited number of 1934-B and 1935-B coins were released.

In some cases, the date on an already manufactured coin die was altered. As this could not be done without leaving a trace of the former date, some coins show traces of an older date below the clearly visible date. These include 1897-B over 1896-B, 1900-B over 1894-B, 1901-B over 1900-B, 1909-B over 1908-B, 1904-B over 1898-B, 1903-B over 1902-B, 1908-B over 1903-B, 1904-B over 1903-B, 1929-B over 1901-B, 1908-B over 1907-B, and 1910-B over 1900-B.

The British trade dollar was demonetized on 1 August 1937.

=== United States ===
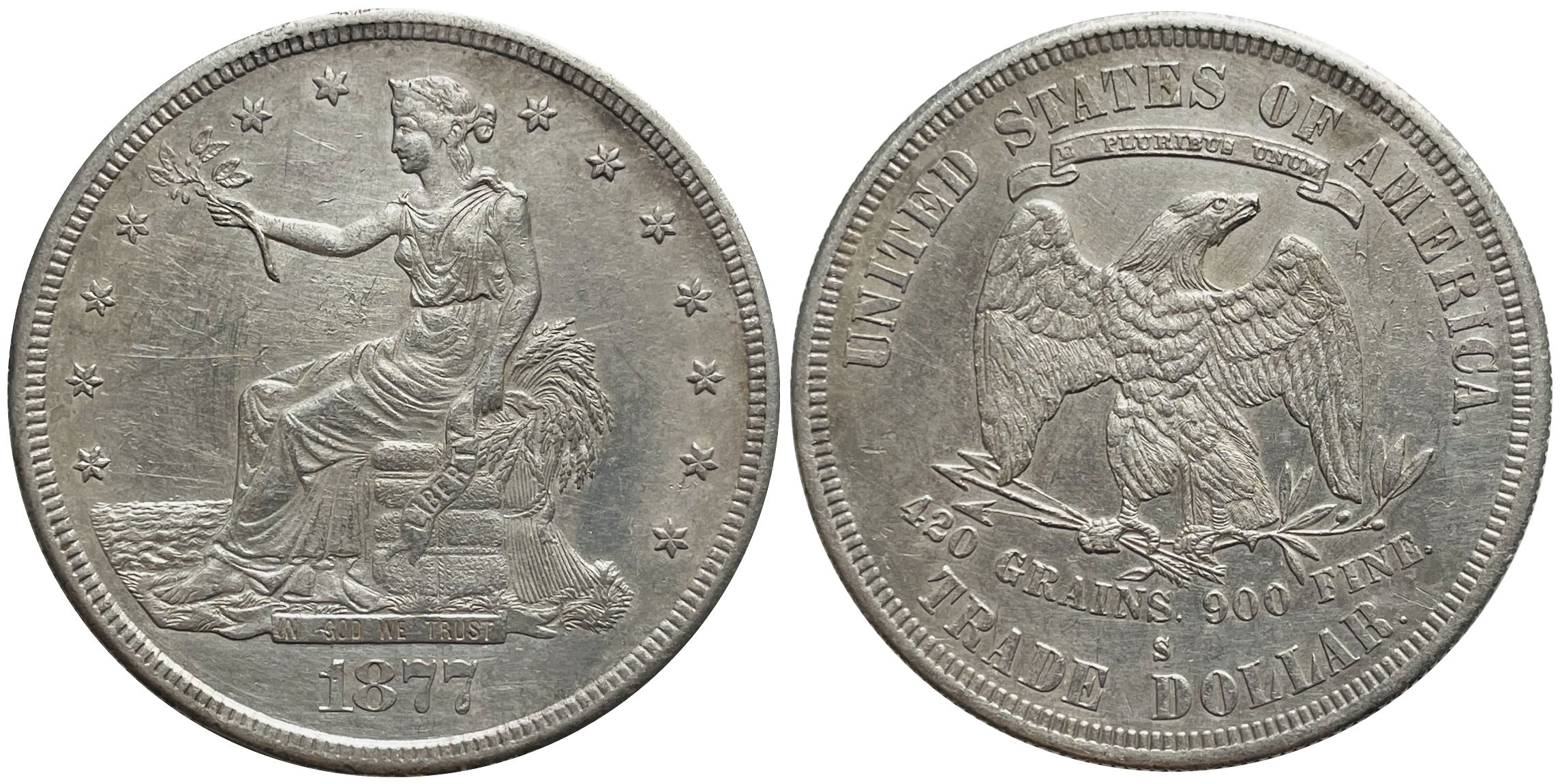
1877 United States Trade Dollar pattern.

The United States trade dollar is a silver (fineness of .900 or 90%) dollar coin that was issued by the United States Mint and minted in Philadelphia, Pennsylvania, Carson City, and San Francisco from 1873 to 1885. Business strike trade dollars were last produced in 1878 and proof coin production continued until 1885. The coin weighs 420 grains (7/8 of a troy ounce) (27.2 g), about 8 grains (0.52 g) more than the domestic silver dollar (Seated Liberty Dollars and Morgan Dollars) of the time. It is 4 grains heavier than the Mexican peso; however, the peso is .903 silver.

The coin was designed by William Barber, the mint's chief engraver. More trade dollars were minted in San Francisco than Carson City and Philadelphia combined. San Francisco was closest both to the source of the silver as well as the ultimate destination of the coins, China. Many Trade dollars have what are called "chopmarks" on them. Chinese merchants would stamp the coins in order to verify their correct weight and value.

The United States Congress authorized the U.S. Mint to create a trade dollar to improve trade with the Orient, China in particular. Prior to that, the Mexican peso had been the primary silver coin used in trading with China. In fact, the eagle on the trade dollar's reverse looks quite similar to the peso's.

== See also ==
- Trade dollar locket
