= Pandavulu =

Pandavulu means Pandavas in the Telugu-language, the protagonists of the ancient Indian epic Mahabharata, and may refer to these Indian films:

- Mana Voori Pandavulu, a 1978 Telugu film
- Kaliyuga Pandavulu, a 1986 Telugu film
- Pandavulu Pandavulu Tummeda, a 2014 Telugu film

== See also ==
- Pandu (disambiguation)
- Pandiyan (disambiguation)
