= Bailer (hydrogeology) =

Tube for retrieving groundwater samples

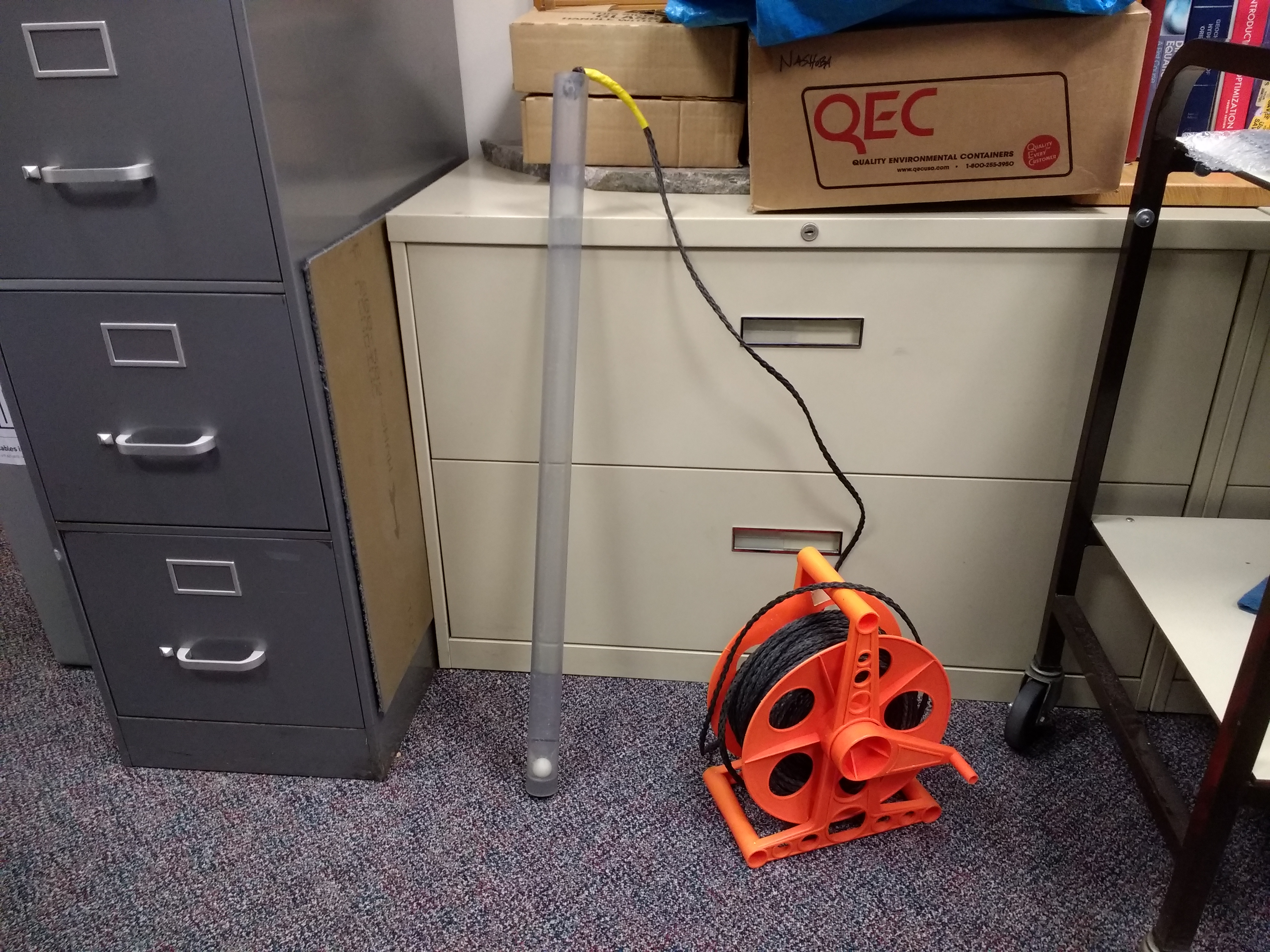
a bailer used for sampling groundwater

A bailer in hydrogeology is a hollow tube used to retrieve groundwater samples from monitoring wells. The wells are typically built out of PVC casing which is slotted to allow groundwater to flow freely through the well. Bailers are tied to a piece of rope (usually made from nylon or polypropylene) or a piece of wire (composed of Teflon or stainless steel) and lowered into the water column. Once lowered, the bailer uses a simple ball check valve to seal at the bottom in order to pull up a sample of the groundwater table. Bailers can be disposable or reusable, and they are made out of polyethylene, PVC, FEP or stainless steel.

There are advantages and disadvantages to using bailers for groundwater sampling. Bailers are simple devices to use and are relatively inexpensive. Disposable bailers are usually cleaned to United States Environmental Protection Agency specifications and individually packaged to protect sample integrity. In addition, bailers can be lowered to any depth while pumps have sharp limitations on the depth of the well. The main drawback of using bailers is aeration of the water as the sample is obtained, which could release volatile organic compounds that need to be tested. Also, if there is a high amount of sediment or turbidity, this may interfere with the ball check valve seating correctly.

A basic disposable bailer can also be used as the slug in a slug test to remove water from the well. This is sometimes referred to more specifically as the bail-down test. A disposable bailer is light and easy to carry in field conditions in comparison to a heavy solid slug. On the other hand, bailers cannot be used to do falling head tests (i.e. where the slug is quickly dropped below the water table). Bailers' check valves not seating properly and water potentially splashing off from the top of the bailer are other issues which might compromise test results.

== See also ==
- Hand bailer
