= Wólka Żukowska =

- Village
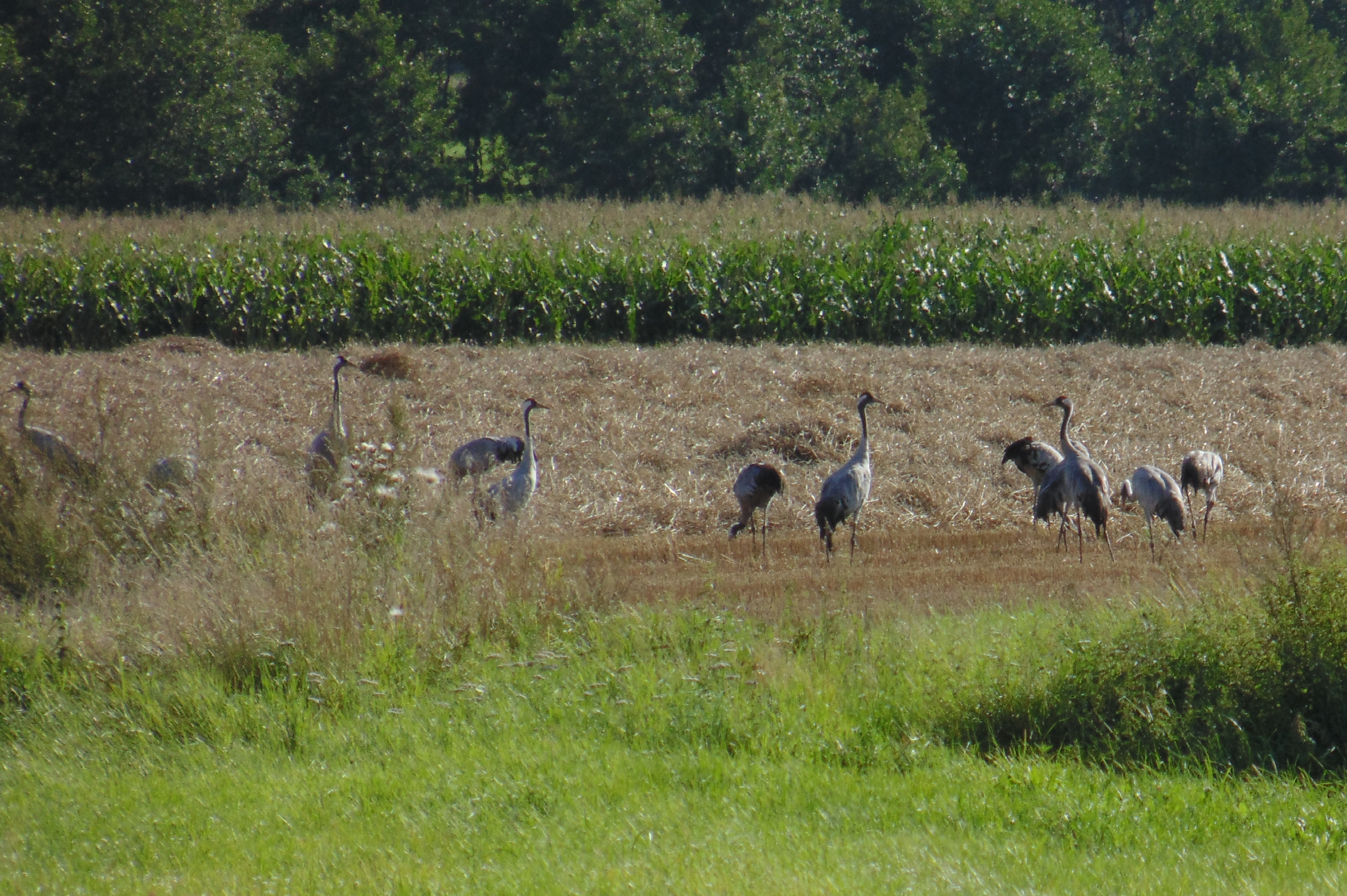

- Location within Poland
- Coordinates: 52°13′42″N 22°05′28″E
- Country: Poland
- Voivodeship: Masovian
- County: Siedlce
- Gmina: Mokobody

Wólka Żukowska [ˈvulka ʐuˈkɔfska] is a village in the administrative district of Gmina Mokobody, within Siedlce County, Masovian Voivodeship, in east-central Poland. It had a population of 7 as of 2011.
