= Pandiyan =

Pandiyan may refer to:

- Pandyan dynasty, which ruled South India from pre-historic times until end of the 15th century
- Pandiyan (actor), Indian actor
- Pandiyan (film), 1992 Indian film by S. P. Muthuraman.
- Pandya (surname), Indian surname

== See also ==
- Pandu (disambiguation)
- Pandavulu (disambiguation)
- Bale Pandiya (disambiguation)
