= Bailing =

Bailing may refer to:

- Bailing (boardsports), process of falling off a board
- Bailing (boats), the removal of water from a vessel
- Bailing Sport Park, in Shilin District, Taipei, Taiwan
- Bailing, Jiangxi, a town in Jiangxi, China
- Bailing, Wulipu, Shayang, Jingmen, Hubei
