= Kisielany-Żmichy =

- Village
- Location within Poland
- Coordinates: 52°14′11″N 22°10′19″E
- Country: Poland
- Voivodeship: Masovian
- County: Siedlce
- Gmina: Mokobody

Kisielany-Żmichy [kiɕɛˈlanɨ ˈʐmixɨ] is a village in the administrative district of Gmina Mokobody, within Siedlce County, Masovian Voivodeship, in east-central Poland.
