= Księżpole-Smolaki =

- Village
- Location within Poland
- Coordinates: 52°18′57″N 22°5′42″E
- Country: Poland
- Voivodeship: Masovian
- County: Siedlce
- Gmina: Mokobody
- Population: 70

Księżpole-Smolaki [kɕɛ̃ʂˈpɔlɛ smɔˈlaki] is a village in the administrative district of Gmina Mokobody, within Siedlce County, Masovian Voivodeship, in east-central Poland.
