= Jeruzale =

- Village
- Location within Poland
- Coordinates: 52°17′37″N 22°11′09″E
- Country: Poland
- Voivodeship: Masovian
- County: Siedlce
- Gmina: Mokobody

Jeruzale [jɛruˈzalɛ] is a village in the administrative district of Gmina Mokobody, within Siedlce County, Masovian Voivodeship, in east-central Poland.
