= Gmina Mokobody =

Gmina Mokobody Mokobody Commune
- Gmina
- Coat of arms
- Interactive map of Gmina Mokobody
- Coordinates (Mokobody): 52°17′N 22°7′E
- Country: Poland
- Voivodeship: Masovian
- County: Siedlce County
- Seat: Mokobody

Area
  - Total: 119.17 km^{2} (46.01 sq mi)

Population (2014)
  - Total: 5,092
  - Density: 42.73/km^{2} (110.7/sq mi)
- Website: http://www.mokobody.pl

Gmina Mokobody is a rural gmina (administrative district) in Siedlce County, Masovian Voivodeship, in east-central Poland. Its seat is the village of Mokobody, which lies approximately 16 kilometres (10 mi) north-west of Siedlce and 75 km (46 mi) east of Warsaw.

The gmina covers an area of 119.17 square kilometres (46.0 sq mi), and, as of 2006, its total population is 5,293 (5,092 in 2014).

== Villages ==
Gmina Mokobody contains the villages and settlements of Bale, Dąbrowa, Jeruzale, Kapuściaki, Kisielany-Kuce, Kisielany-Żmichy, Księżpole-Jałmużny, Księżpole-Smolaki, Męczyn, Męczyn-Kolonia, Mokobody, Mokobody-Kolonia, Niwiski, Osiny Dolne, Osiny Górne, Pieńki, Skupie, Świniary, Wesoła, Wólka Proszewska, Wólka Żukowska, Wyłazy, Zaliwie-Brzozówka, Zaliwie-Piegawki, Zaliwie-Szpinki, Zemły, Ziomaki and Żuków.

== Neighbouring gminas ==
Gmina Mokobody is bordered by the gminas of Bielany, Grębków, Kotuń, Liw, Siedlce, and Suchożebry.
