= Bale Pandiya =

Bale Pandiya may refer these Indian Tamil-language films:

- Bale Pandiya (1962 film), starring Sivaji Ganesan, M. R. Radha and Devika, directed by Ramakrishnaiah Panthulu
- Bale Pandiya (2010 film), starring Vishnu Vishal, Piaa Bajpai and Pradeep Rawat, directed by Siddharth Chandrasekhar

== See also ==
- Bale (disambiguation)
- Pandiyan (disambiguation)
