= Mokobody =

- Village
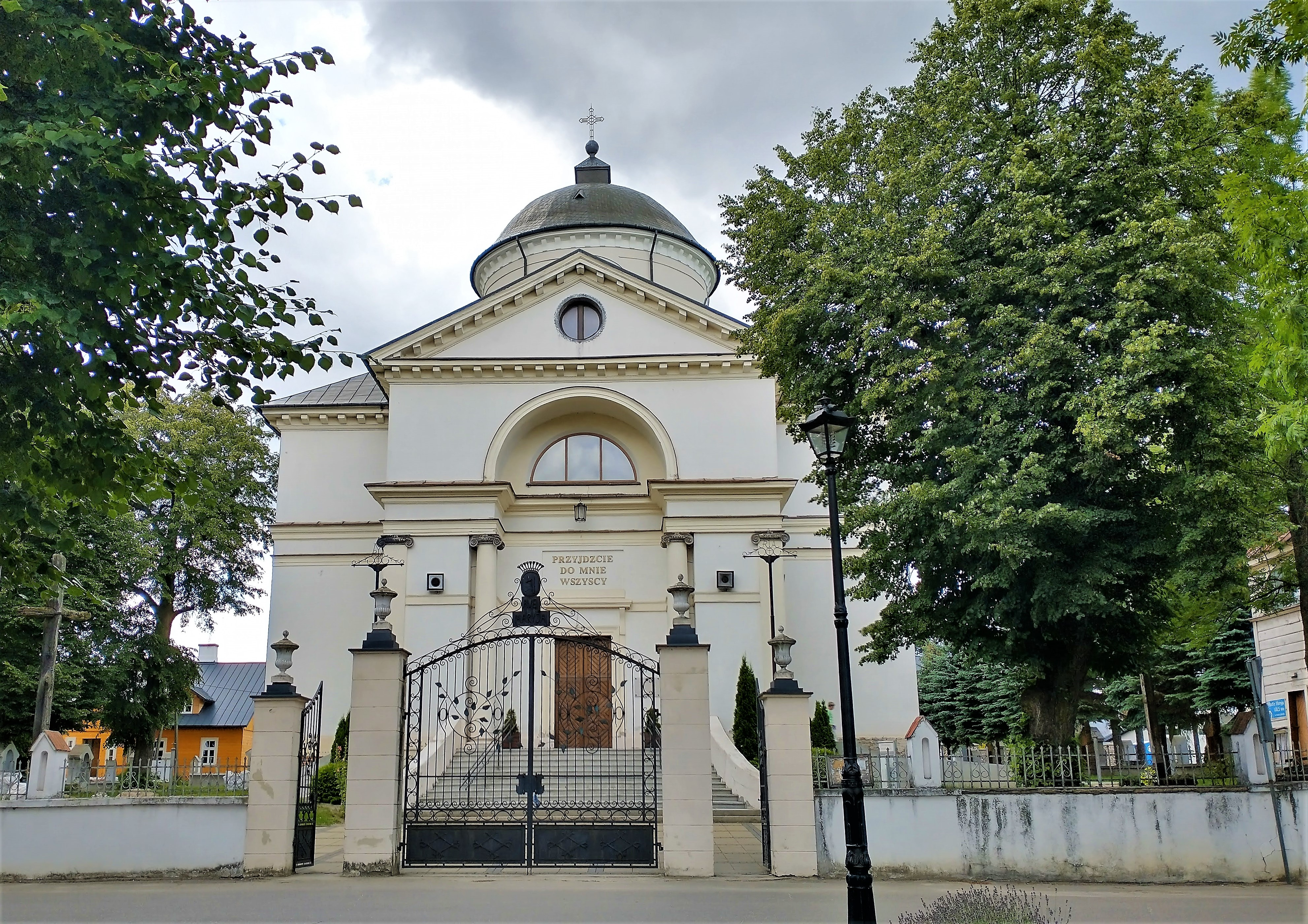
- Saint Hedwig Church

- Location within Poland
- Coordinates: 52°17′N 22°7′E
- Country: Poland
- Voivodeship: Masovian
- County: Siedlce
- Gmina: Mokobody

Population
  - Total: 1,600
- Time zone: UTC+1 (CET)
  - Summer (DST): UTC+2 (CEST)
- Vehicle registration: WSI
- Website: http://www.mokobody.pl/

Mokobody [mɔkɔˈbɔdɨ] is a village in Siedlce County, Masovian Voivodeship, in east-central Poland, in the historical region of Podlachia. It is the seat of the gmina (administrative district) called Gmina Mokobody.

== History ==
In 1496, it was granted Chełmno town rights with two annual fairs by Alexander Jagiellon. King Sigismund I the Old allowed to change the name to Nowe Miasto, meaning "new town", however, the old name remained in use. It was a private town of the Chreptowicz and Ossoliński noble families, administratively located in the Drohiczyn County in the Podlaskie Voivodeship in the Lesser Poland Province of the Kingdom of Poland. In 1774, King Stanisław August Poniatowski established eight annual fairs.

Following the joint German-Soviet invasion of Poland, which started World War II in September 1939, Mokobody was occupied by Germany until 1944.
