= Bael =

Bael may refer to:

- Aegle marmelos, commonly known as bael, a species of tree
- Bael (demon), a demon described in demonological grimoires
- Bael (Dungeons & Dragons), a Dungeons & Dragons character
- Bael (Devil May Cry), a demon from the video game Devil May Cry 4
- Bael (wrestler), Filipino American professional wrestler Benito Cuntapay (born 1978)
- Bael Bael, Victoria, Australia
- El Libertador Air Base, an air base in Venezuela

== See also ==
- Baal (disambiguation)
- Bail (disambiguation)
