= Dąbrowa, Gmina Mokobody =

Dąbrowa
- Village
- Location within Poland
- Coordinates: 52°18′05″N 22°04′55″E
- Country: Poland
- Voivodeship: Masovian
- County: Siedlce
- Gmina: Mokobody

Dąbrowa [dɔmˈbrɔva] is a village in the administrative district of Gmina Mokobody, within Siedlce County, Masovian Voivodeship, in east-central Poland.
