= Pandu (disambiguation) =

Pandu was a king of the Kuru Kingdom and a progenitor of the Pandavas in Indian mythology.

Pandu may also refer to:

- Pandu (actor) (1947–2021), an Indian actor in Tamil cinema
- Pandu (film), a 2021 Indian Marathi-language film
- Pandu, a village near Chakothi in Azad Kashmir, Pakistan; site of the 1947 Battle of Pandu during the Indo-Pakistani war of 1947–1948

== See also ==
- Panduvamshi (disambiguation)
- Pandiyan (disambiguation)
- Pandavulu (disambiguation)
- Pandurang, Hindu god
- Pandurangashram, eighth guru of Chitrapur Saraswat Brahmin community
- Pandurang Sadashiv Khankhoje (1884–1967), Indian scientist and statesman
- Pandurang Sadashiv Sane, an Indian freedom fighter
- Pandurang Shastri Athavale, Indian activist, philosopher, spiritual leader, social revolutionary
