= Trade-dollar locket =

Locket made from two coins

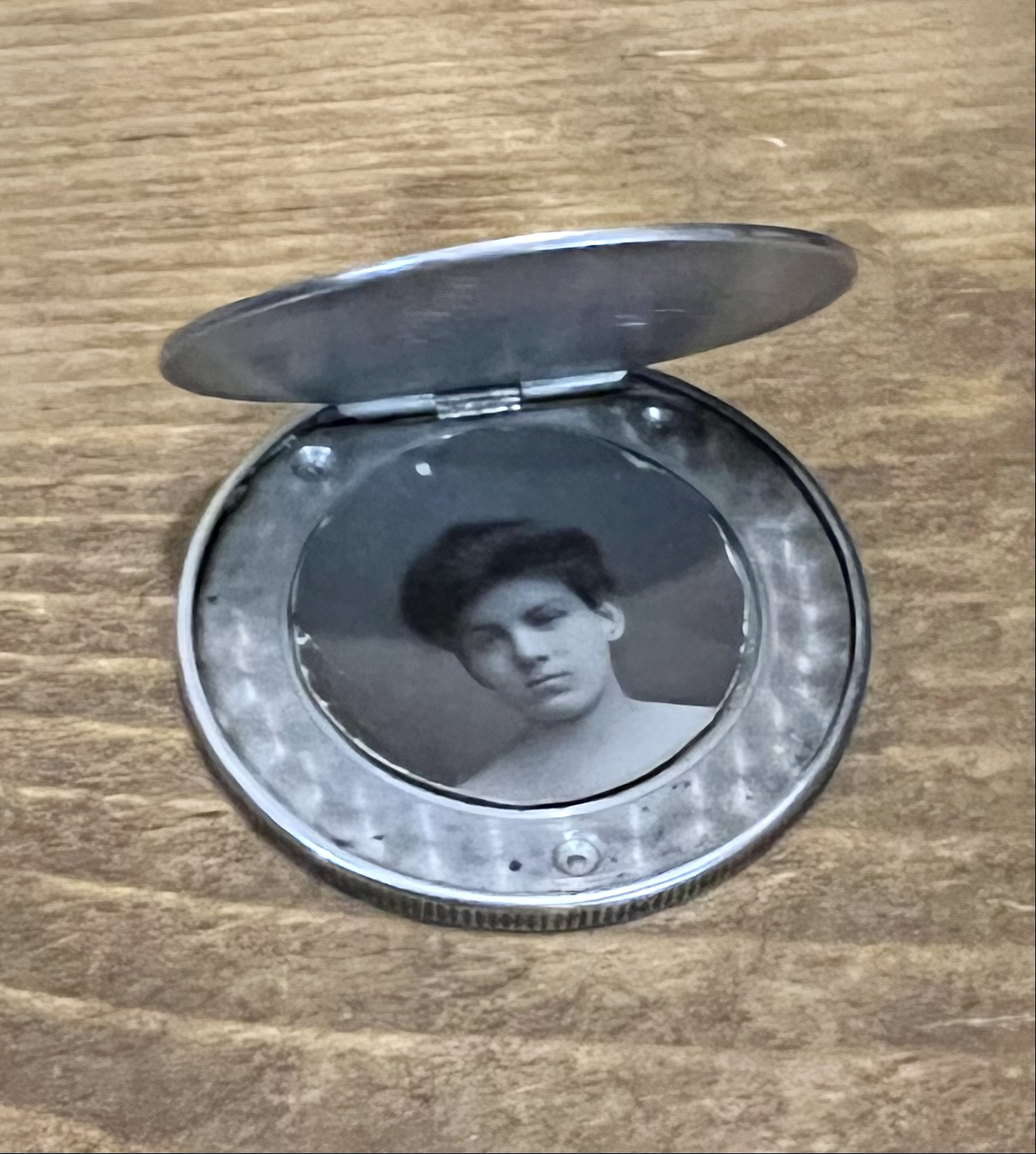
Open trade-dollar locket, revealing a concealed photograph

A trade-dollar locket, also known as a box dollar or an opium dollar, is a type of locket created from two coins, typically trade dollars, that were hinged together to form a hidden compartment. As trade dollars circulated in Asia in the late 19th century, the lockets were popularly thought to be used to carry opium concealed in the secret compartment. An image could also be placed in the compartment of the coin making it a traditional locket.

== History ==
The United States minted trade dollars between 1873 and 1878 to facilitate trade with East Asia. Trade-dollar lockets were made by hinging together two such coins to form a compartment, which could be opened by pressing on the lid or edge. As the trade dollars circulated in East Asia, including China, trade-dollar lockets were thought to be used to conceal a small quantity of opium, but an 1896 advertisement marketing one as a "secret locket" suggests that it was not intended for use in drug trafficking. Experts are not sure if the coins were ever used to conceal opium, but the coins were widely used in trade between the United States and Orient which is where the majority of opium came from. An 1893 issue of Donahoe's Magazine described their locket as "a pretty thing to have around" to hide a "dear face which no one else can discover". In 1896, an illustrated catalogue titled Busiest House in America advertised a six-dollar "secret locket" made from trade dollars.

== Function ==
When closed the coin appeared to be an ordinary trade dollar. The lockets could also be used traditionally, to conceal an image. An 1896 publication which purports to be one manufacturer of the trade dollar locket suggests that the coin was not used to conceal opium. Coin dealer B. Max Mehl suggested in his monthly periodical in 1919 that a locket could be "skillfully made" out of two coins for five to ten dollars.
