= Mokobody-Kolonia =

- Village
- Location within Poland
- Coordinates: 52°16′58″N 22°7′45″E
- Country: Poland
- Voivodeship: Masovian
- County: Siedlce
- Gmina: Mokobody

Mokobody-Kolonia [mɔkɔˈbɔdɨ kɔˈlɔɲa] is a village in the administrative district of Gmina Mokobody, within Siedlce County, Masovian Voivodeship, in east-central Poland.
