= Kisielany-Kuce =

- Village
- Location within Poland
- Coordinates: 52°14′09″N 22°11′16″E
- Country: Poland
- Voivodeship: Masovian
- County: Siedlce
- Gmina: Mokobody

Kisielany-Kuce [kiɕɛˈlanɨ ˈkut͡sɛ] is a village in the administrative district of Gmina Mokobody, within Siedlce County, Masovian Voivodeship, in east-central Poland.
