= Bansari =

Bansari or Bansuri may refer to:

- Bansuri, an Indian bamboo flute
- Bansari (1943 film), a 1943 Indian Hindi-language social film
- Bansari (1978 film), a 1978 Indian Bengali-language film
- Bansuri: The Flute, 2021 Indian film

== See also ==
- Bansi (disambiguation)
