= Bailout (disambiguation) =

A bailout is an act of loaning or giving capital to an entity that is in danger of failing.

When written as two words—bail out—it commonly refers to:

- Bail out, to secure the release of an arrested person by providing bail money
- Bail out (or bale out), to exit an aircraft while in flight, using a parachute

Bailout may also refer to:

- Bailout (film), an unmade film that was to star Jack Black, circa 2011
- Bail Out (film), a 1989 film starring David Hasselhoff
- "Bailout" (Parks and Recreation), a 2013 television episode
- "Bail Out" (Suits), a 2011 television episode
- Bailout at 43,000, a 1957 American drama film
- Bailout: The Age of Greed, previous name of the 2013 film Assault on Wall Street
- Bailout! The Game, a board game created in 2008
- Bailout bottle, an emergency gas cylinder carried by a diver

== See also ==
- "Bale Out", a satirical dance remix by American composer Lucian Piane
- Bailing (boats)
