= Grace Shattuck Bail =

American composer, poet and teacher

Grace Shattuck Bail (1898–1996) was an American composer, poet and teacher.

== Personal life and career ==
Bail was born in Cherry Creek, New York, on January 17, 1898. She played the piano and the violin as a child. In 1919, she graduated from the Dana Musical Institute. She taught piano, organ and violin to her students for years. Her works have been published in works such as The Washington Star, The Pen Women and Weirdbook.

Bail's The Sea Shell won the Lucile Palmer contest for penwomen in 1943 and Palmer, who was also a poet, read the poem on the radio. Her entry in International Encyclopedia of Women Composers states that she won many awards and medals.
