= Bansi Pandit =

Bansi Pandit (born June 1, 1942) is a writer and speaker on Hinduism. Originally from Kashmir, Pandit is a retired nuclear engineer and lives in Glen Ellyn, Illinois. He is the author of several books.

== Works ==
- Hindu Dharma (1996) ISBN 0-9634798-3-0
- Fundamentals of Hindu Religion and Philosophy for All Ages (1998) ISBN 0-9634798-2-2
- Explore Hinduism (2005) ISBN 1-872883-81-8
- Who Are Kashmiri Pandits (2015) ISBN 0-9634798-65
- Hindus of Kashmir - A Genocide Forgotten (2021) ISBN 979-8-586-69703-5
- Isha Upanishad For Beginners (2021) ISBN 979-8473947335
- Yajnopavita - The Sacred Thread (2020) ISBN 979-8539974947
