= Baal (band) =

Danish rock band

- Origin: Copenhagen, Denmark
- Genres: rock
- Years active: 1994-Present
- Labels: Universal, Virgin
- Members: Bjørn Fjæsted; Troels Skjærbæk; Morten Lundsgaard; Henrik Sten Melander; Kenni Andy Jørgensen
- Past members: Jesper Grann; Jimmi Krogsgaard; David Kampmann
- Website: Baals Facebook page

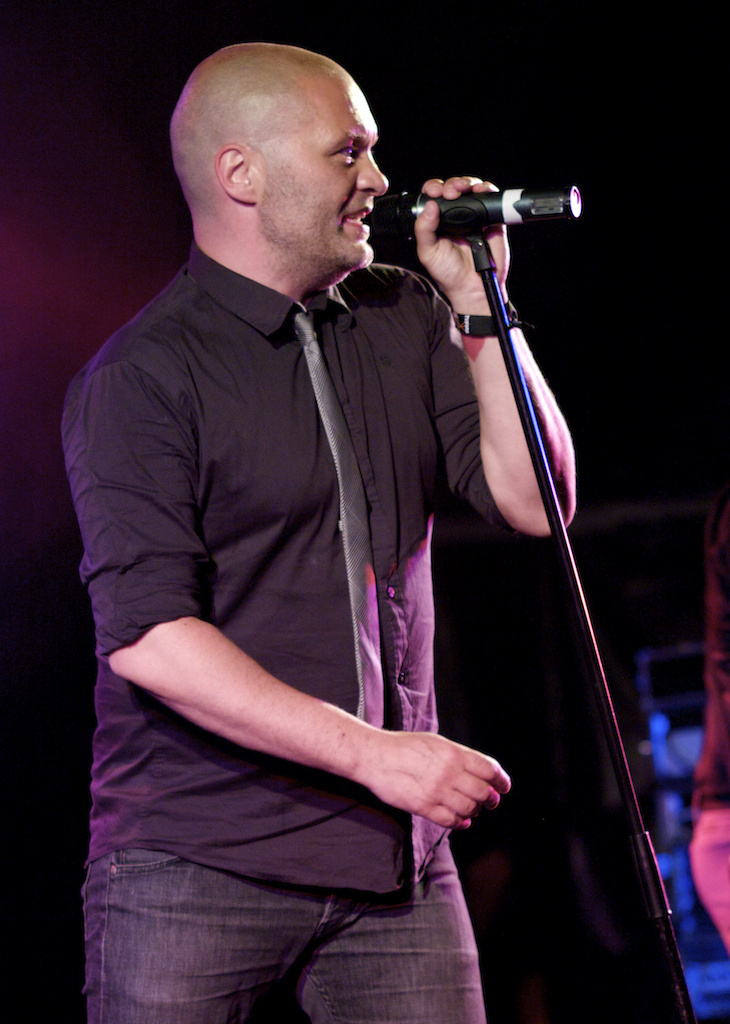
Bjørn Fjæsted, lead singer

Baal is a Danish rock band formed in 1994 in Copenhagen. Besides their studio records, Baal has also created music for three musicals. Baal started out as a David Bowie cover band under a different name, and later changed name to Baal and started writing their own music.

== Discography ==
=== Studio albums ===
Date of release	Title	Label
1996	Sensorama	Virgin Records
1998	Karaoke	Virgin Records
1999	Funtex	Virgin Records
2002	The Supreme Machine	Virgin Records
2005	Do You Come With Special Features?	Universal Records
2008	Behind Your Echoes	Universal Records
2019	Time Is Old	Baal
2020	The Quiet Sessions (with LiveStrings	2020 Baal
2024	Circles	Eurodope Records

=== Musical albums ===
Date of release	Title	Label
2001	Englesyn	
2002	Antigone	
2003	The Last Show	

== Live records ==
Date of Release	Title	Label
1996	Live (Official bootleg)	Eurodope

== Other appearances ==
In 1995, Baal appeared on a record from Danish National Television, called Coming Up, with a set of new Danish artists. Baal appeared as track number one with "Chronical Love Song", later to be found on the Sensorama album.

In 1997, Baal created the title song for the Danish film Eye of the Eagle, titled "Silent Eye". This song was released as a single containing three different versions of the song along with a film music suite.

== English translation of references ==
- 1. Translation of reference 1 (Google)
