= René Bail =

Canadian director, cinematographer and actor

René Bail (1931–2007) was a Canadian director, cinematographer and actor.

== Filmography ==
- La Défaite du général Pringle (1952)
- Tan-tan-des-bois (1952)
- Images (Jeux) (1953)
- Chantier (1954)
- Ville Marie, 7 hrs. a.m. (1954)
- Images (1955)
- L'Écurie (1956)
- Mécanique (1956)
- Printemps (1957)
- Les Désoeuvrés (1959)
- Kronos (1961)
- À tout prendre (1963)
- Moi, un jour (1967)
- The Rape of a Sweet Young Girl (Le Viol d'une jeune fille douce) (1968)
- Valérie (1968)
