= Ballah, Karnal =

Ballah
- Village
- Location in Haryana, India Ballah (India)
- Coordinates: 29°30′20″N 76°47′15″E
- Country: India
- State: Haryana
- District: Karnal
- Elevation: 237 m (778 ft)

Languages
  - Official: HINDI, HARYANVI
- Time zone: UTC+5:30 (IST)
- Postal code: 132040
- Vehicle registration: HR-40
- Sex Ratio: 904:1000 ♂/♀
- Website: haryana.gov.in

Ballah or Balla is a village in Assandh tehsil of Karnal district, Haryana, India. The village is located about 22 km from Karnal on a road leading to Assandh, which is deemed State Highway 12. It is also connected to Nissing via a road that leads to Kaithal and Gondar.

Safidon, Gharaunda, Assandh, and Panipat are the nearby cities to Ballah.
