= Baale =

Baale may refer to:

- Baale (title), a title used in parts of Nigeria
- Baale language, a language of Ethiopia and South Sudan
- Baale of Judah, a place mentioned in the Bible
