= Andrew W. Murray =

American evolutionary biologist

- Education: Clare College, Cambridge; Harvard Medical School
- Scientific career
- Fields: Evolutionary biology Molecular biology
- Workplaces: University of California, San Francisco; Harvard University; Howard Hughes Medical Institute
- Thesis: Chromosome and plasmid behavior in yeast (1984)
- Doctoral advisor: Jack Szostak
- Other academic advisors: Marc Kirschner

Andrew Wood Murray is a British-born American evolutionary biologist known for his research on budding yeast. He is the Herchel Smith Professor of Molecular Genetics and a Howard Hughes Medical Institute Professor at Harvard University. He was elected to the American Academy of Arts and Sciences in 2000 and to the National Academy of Sciences in 2014. In 2020, he was appointed as the director of the Rowland Institute at Harvard and officially retired from his position in 2026.
