= Bale, Konjic =

Bale Бале
- Village
- Location within Bosnia and Herzegovina
- Coordinates: 43°31′N 18°17′E
- Country: Bosnia and Herzegovina
- Entity: Federation of Bosnia and Herzegovina
- Canton: Herzegovina-Neretva
- Municipality: Konjic

Area
  - Total: 1.71 sq mi (4.43 km^{2})

Population (2013)
  - Total: 62
  - Density: 36/sq mi (14/km^{2})
- Time zone: UTC+1 (CET)
  - Summer (DST): UTC+2 (CEST)

Bale (Cyrillic: Бале) is a village in the municipality of Konjic, Bosnia and Herzegovina.

== Demographics ==
According to the 2013 census, its population was 62, all Bosniaks.
