= Bale, Poland =

Bale
- Village
- Location within Poland
- Coordinates: 52°15′N 22°8′E
- Country: Poland
- Voivodeship: Masovian
- County: Siedlce
- Gmina: Mokobody
- Population: 140

Bale [ˈbalɛ] is a village in the administrative district of Gmina Mokobody, within Siedlce County, Masovian Voivodeship, in east-central Poland.
