= Surjit Bhalla =

Indian economist, author and columnist

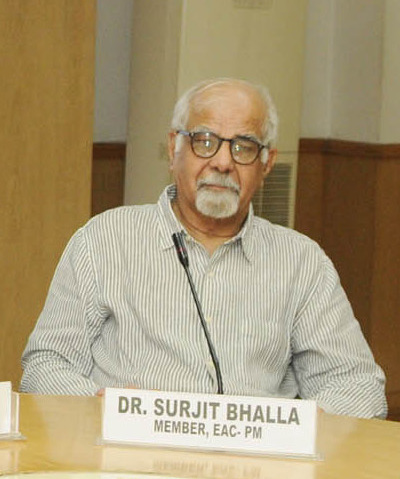
- Bhalla at the first meeting of Economic Advisory Council to the Prime Minister, at NITI Aayog, in New Delhi
- Education: Purdue University (BS); Princeton University (MPA, PhD)
- Occupations: Economist, author

Surjit Bhalla is an Indian economist, author, and columnist who served as Executive Director for India at the International Monetary Fund from 2019 to 2022. Bhalla has also served on the Economic Advisory Council to the Prime Minister from its formation in 2017 until his resignation in December 2018. Bhalla is known for claiming, against World Bank estimates, that global poverty fell faster.

== Education ==
Bhalla has a PhD in Economics from Princeton University, a Master in Public and International Affairs from the Woodrow Wilson School, and a BSEE degree from Purdue University.

== Career ==
Bhalla has taught at the Delhi School of Economics, served as executive director of the Policy Group in New Delhi and as a member of the governing board of the National Council of Applied Economic Research. His research career spans institutions such as the RAND Corporation, the Brookings Institution, and the World Bank. He has held consultancy roles and positions at Deutsche Bank and Goldman Sachs. He founded and chaired Oxus Research & Investments, a New Delhi-based hedge fund from 1997 to 2016. He has also been a regular invitee to the Aspen Institute Program on World Economy in the USA since 2002 and a contributing editor for the Indian Express since 2014.

Bhalla was a part-time members of the Economic Advisory Council to the Prime Minister from its formation in 2017 until his resignation in 2018. In an Indian Express column on the date of his resignation, he wrote that it was "inappropriate for NITI Aayog to be directly involved in the presentation of statistical data by the CSO (Central Statistical Office)." He headed the Commerce Ministry's High Level Advisory Group on Trade & Policy; the group's report favoured India joining the Regional Comprehensive Economic Partnership. He is an advisor to the 16^{th} Finance Commission, a constitutional body in India. In November 2019, he was appointed as Executive Director for India at the International Monetary Fund for three years.

== Research and reception ==
In Imagine There's No Country (2002), Bhalla argued that global poverty and inequality had fallen faster due to globalisation, contrary to the World Bank's estimates. He contended that the Millennium Development Goal of halving poverty by 2015 had already been met in 2000. The book has been called both useful and problematic. Bhalla later published a rebuttal to Martin Ravallion's criticism. In a 2012 book, Bhalla argued that China grew rapidly by systematically undervaluing its currency, without having inflation as conventional theory predicts. A review of the book noted that it was timely and rigorous but lacked attention to how exchange rates affect firms' investment decisions and overstated the argument.

== Works ==
As an author, Bhalla's has written over 1300 articles on globalisation, economic policy, socio-economic issues in India, and the global economy. He has published several books, including:

- Imagine There's No Country: Poverty, Inequality, and Growth in the Era of Globalization (2002)
- Devaluing to Prosperity (2012)
- The New Wealth of Nations (2017)
- Citizen Raj: Indian Elections 1952-2019 (2019)

== See also ==
- Poverty in India
- Poverty threshold
