= Bale (name) =

Bale is a surname. Notable people with the surname include:

- Anthony Bale (born 1975), English medievalist
- Christian Bale (born 1974), English actor born in Wales
- David Bale (1941–2003), South African entrepreneur
- Edward Turner Bale (1810–1849), English physician
- Elvin Bale (born 1945), English circus daredevil
- Emma Bale (born 1999), Belgian singer
- Ernest Bale (1878–1952), English cricketer
- Gareth Bale (born 1989), Welsh footballer
- John Bale (1496–1563), English churchman and playwright
- John Bale (baseball) (born 1974), baseball player
- Lan Bale (born 1969), former South African tennis player
- Paula Bale (born 1965), Fijian rugby player
- Peter Bale (born 1962), New Zealand journalist and editor
- Qoriniasi Bale (1941–2014), Fijian lawyer and politician
- Stuart Bale (born 1964), English tennis player
- Sue Bale, British nursing researcher and administrator
- John de Bale, Member of Parliament in 1302
