= Georges Baal =

- Born: György Balassa; 17 May 1938; Budapest, Kingdom of Hungary
- Died: 6 December 2013 (aged 75); Saint-Mandé, Paris, France
- Occupation(s): Writer, theatrologist, actor, director and psychologist

Georges Baal (born György Balassa; 17 May 1938 – 6 December 2013) was a Hungarian writer, theatrologist, actor, director and psychologist.

Georges Baal died of a heart attack on 6 December 2013, aged 75, in Saint-Mandé, Paris, France, where he had lived since 1956.
