= Jewelry model =

Master design in jewelrey

A jewelry model is a master design that is copied to make many similar pieces of jewelrey. The model may either be a piece of actual finished jewelry or a low-cost blank fashioned from base metal. In either case, the model is used to create the casting mold from which all subsequent pieces are made.

Prefabricated models are available from a number of sources to supply the hobby and high-volume jewelrey manufacture trade.
