= Bailing (boats) =

Process of removing water from a boat

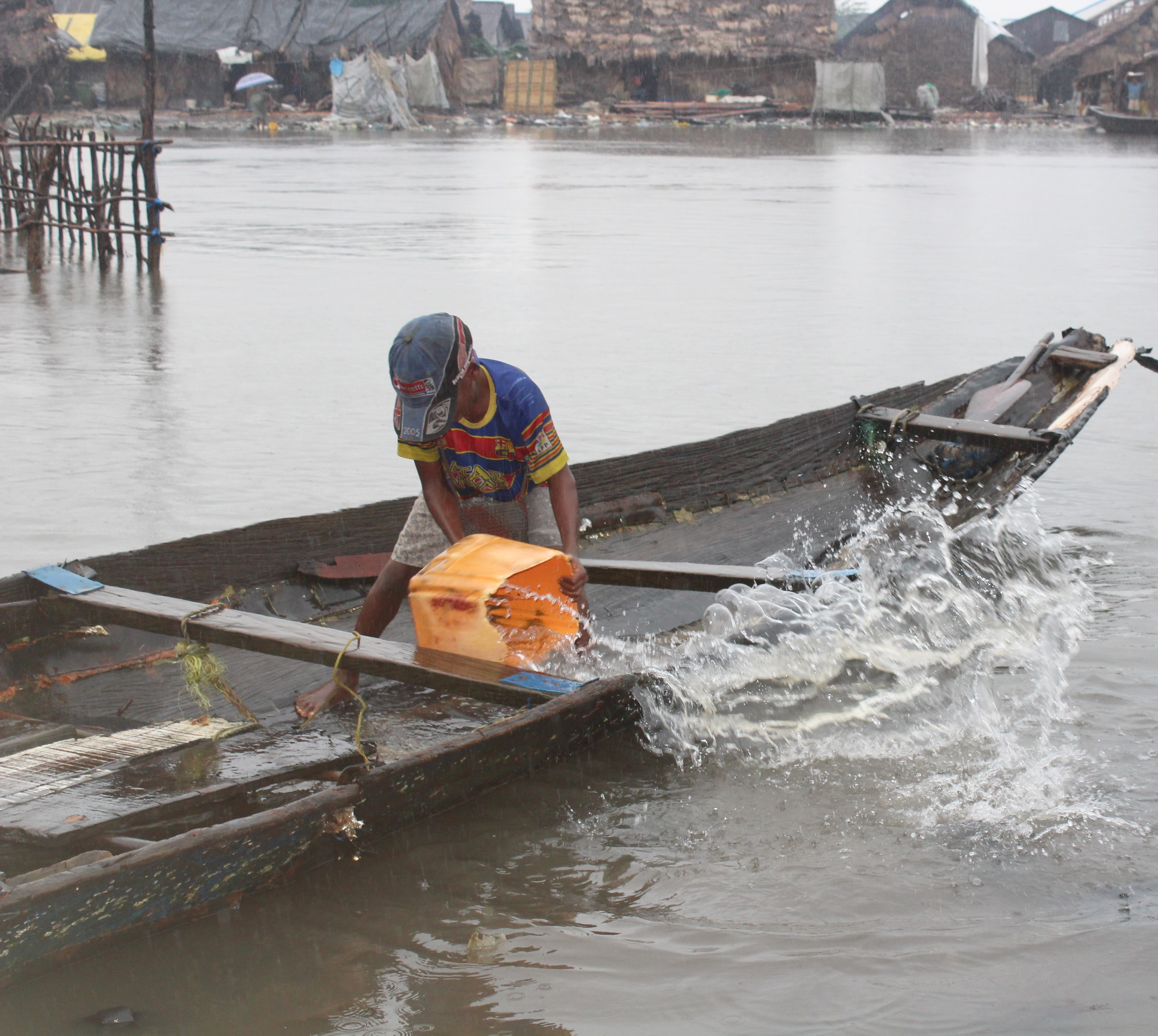
A child bailing water out of his boat in Nigeria

Bailing is the process of removing water from a vessel.

== Hand bailers ==
A hand bailer is a device used for manually removing water which has entered a vessel. In the simplest case, it is merely a smaller container which can be filled and then emptied. This kind of device has been in use since early times. It is still in use on small boats and rafts, though some are self-bailing. Some regulations require either or both forms of bailing.

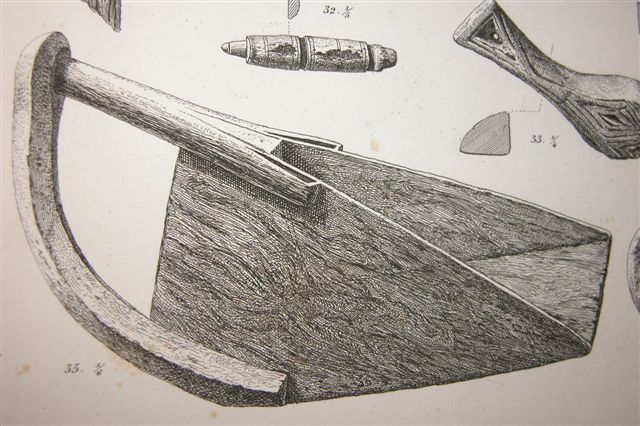
Iron Age hand bailer from Nydam Mose

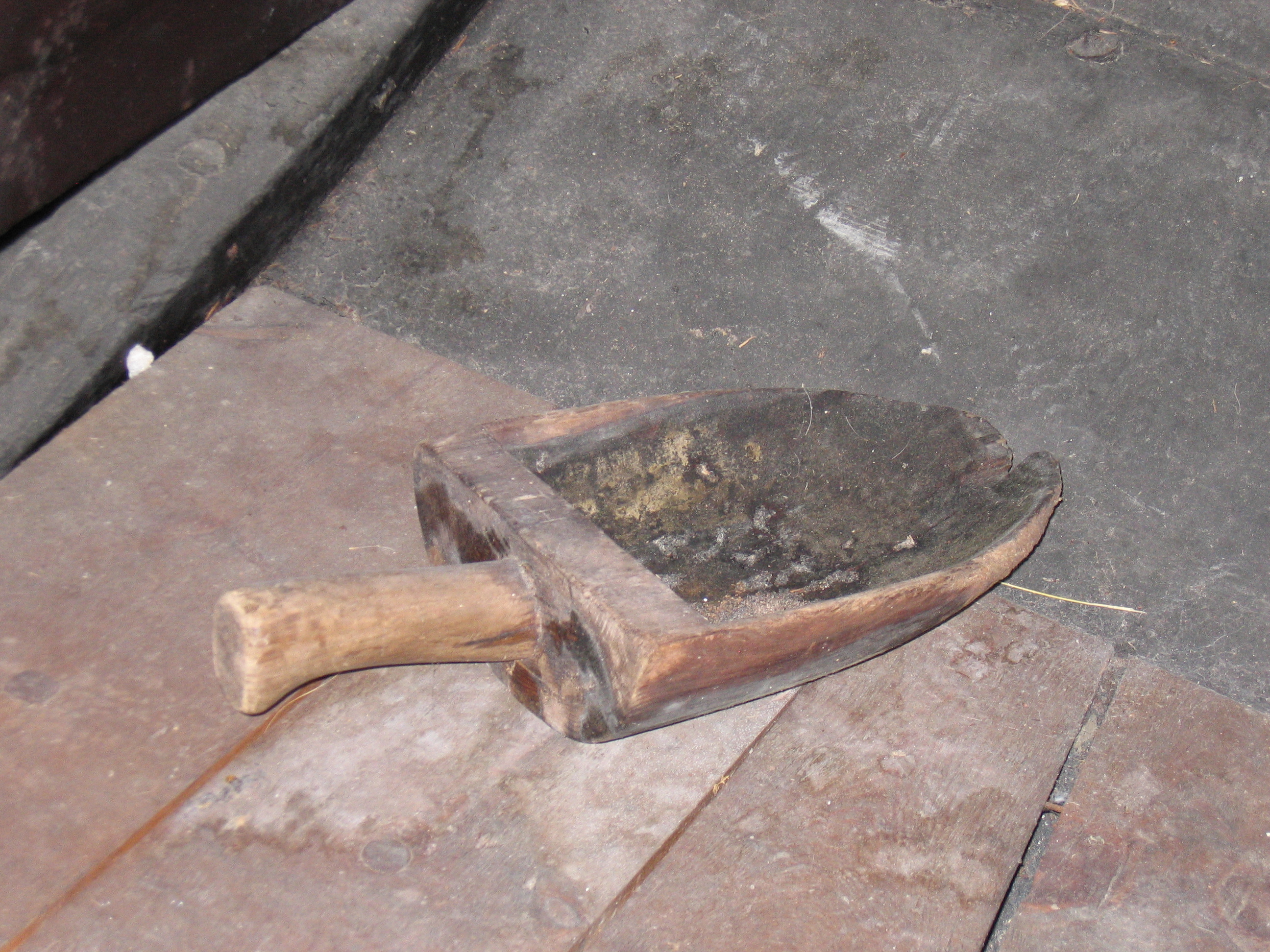
Norwegian "auskjer", traditional hand bailer

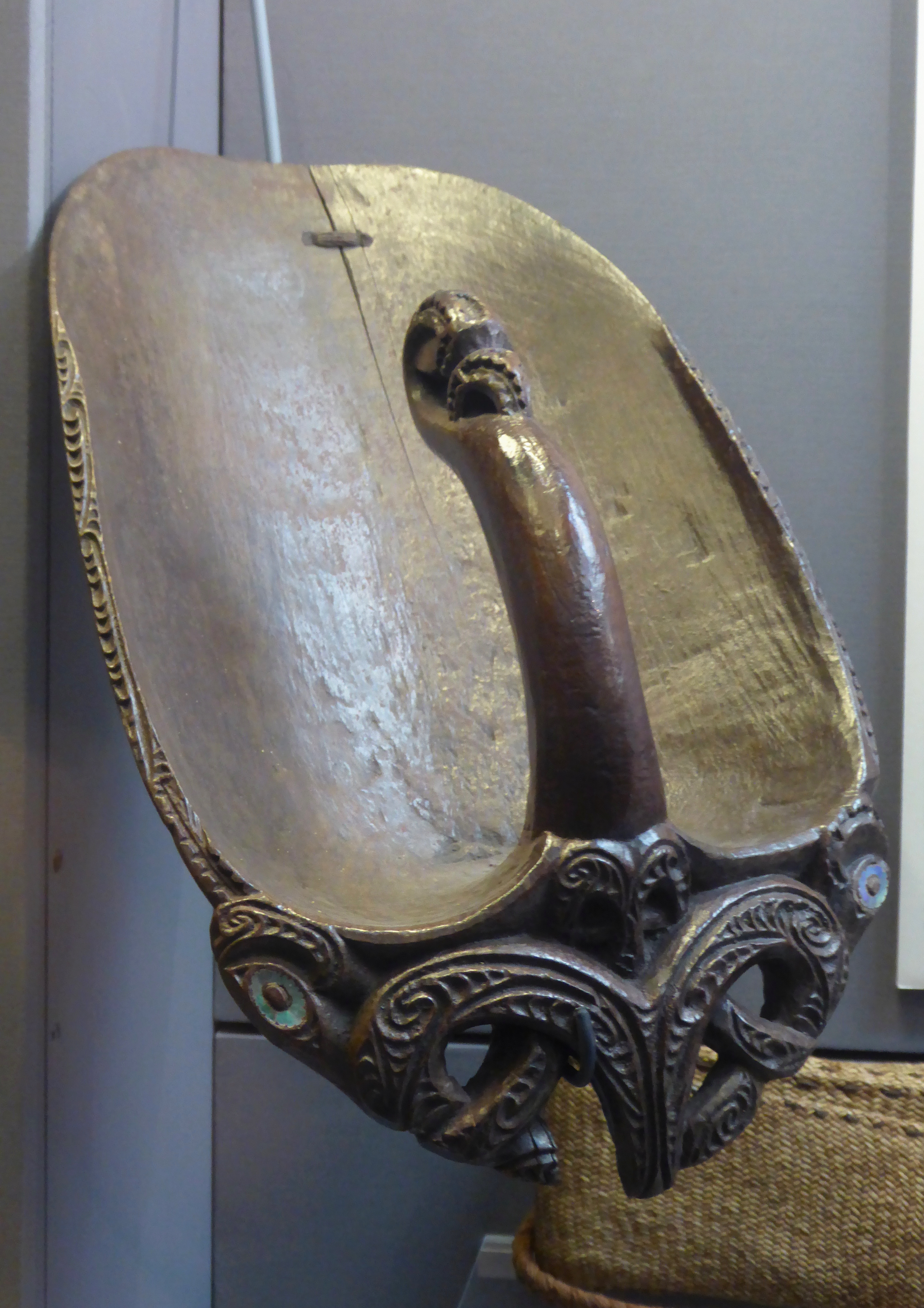
A highly ornamented bailer from New Zealand. It is a common item of Austronesian material culture (known as nima or limas in various related languages)

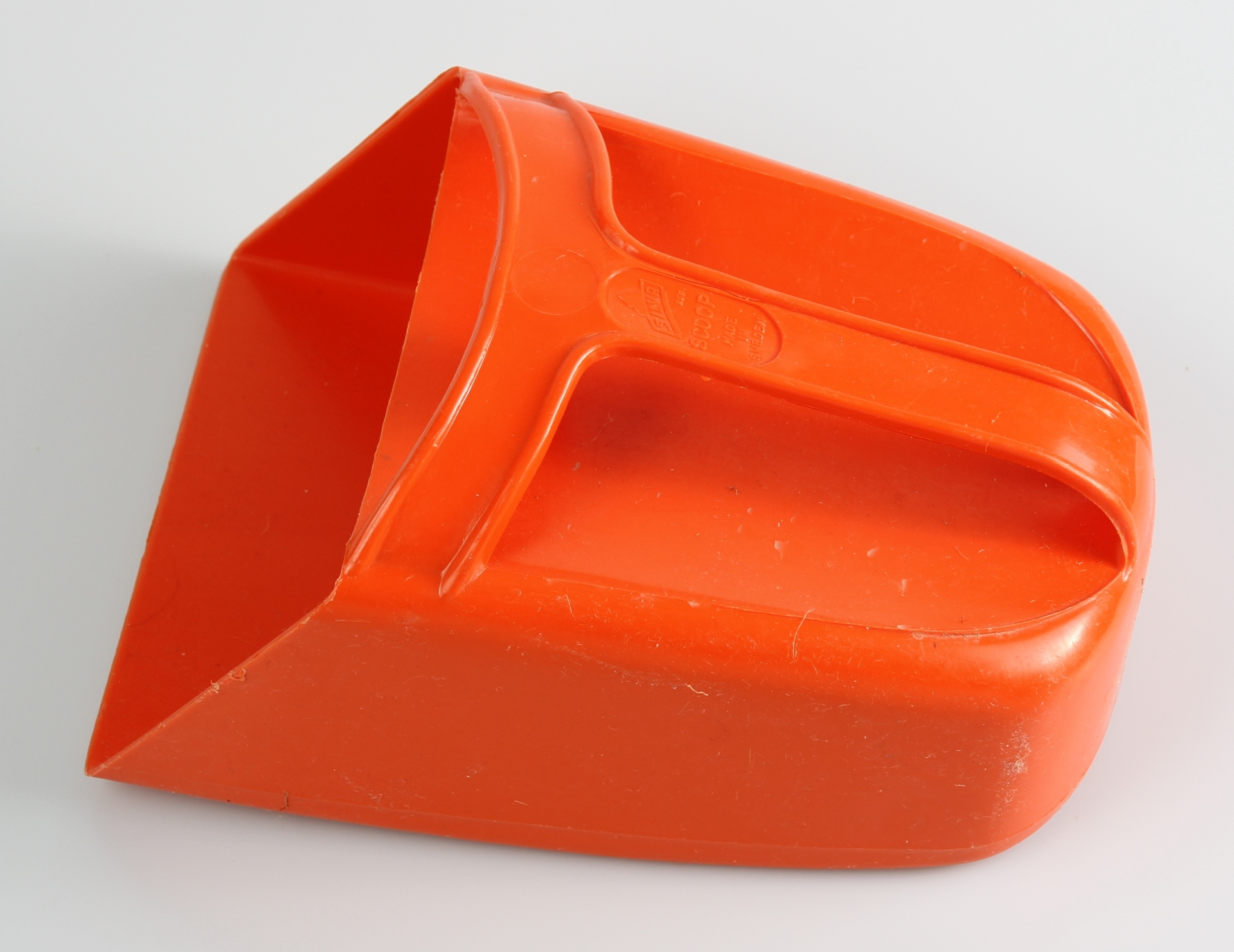
modern plastic hand bailer

== Self bailers ==
For some modern types of dinghies in sailing sports hand bailers can be obsolete when they are equipped with self bailers, sometimes also called automatic bailers. Self-bailing boats are shaped so that they will drain completely if filled with water; powered by the venturi effect and the motion of the boat, they are distinct from the powered bilge pumps used on non-self-bailing boats.

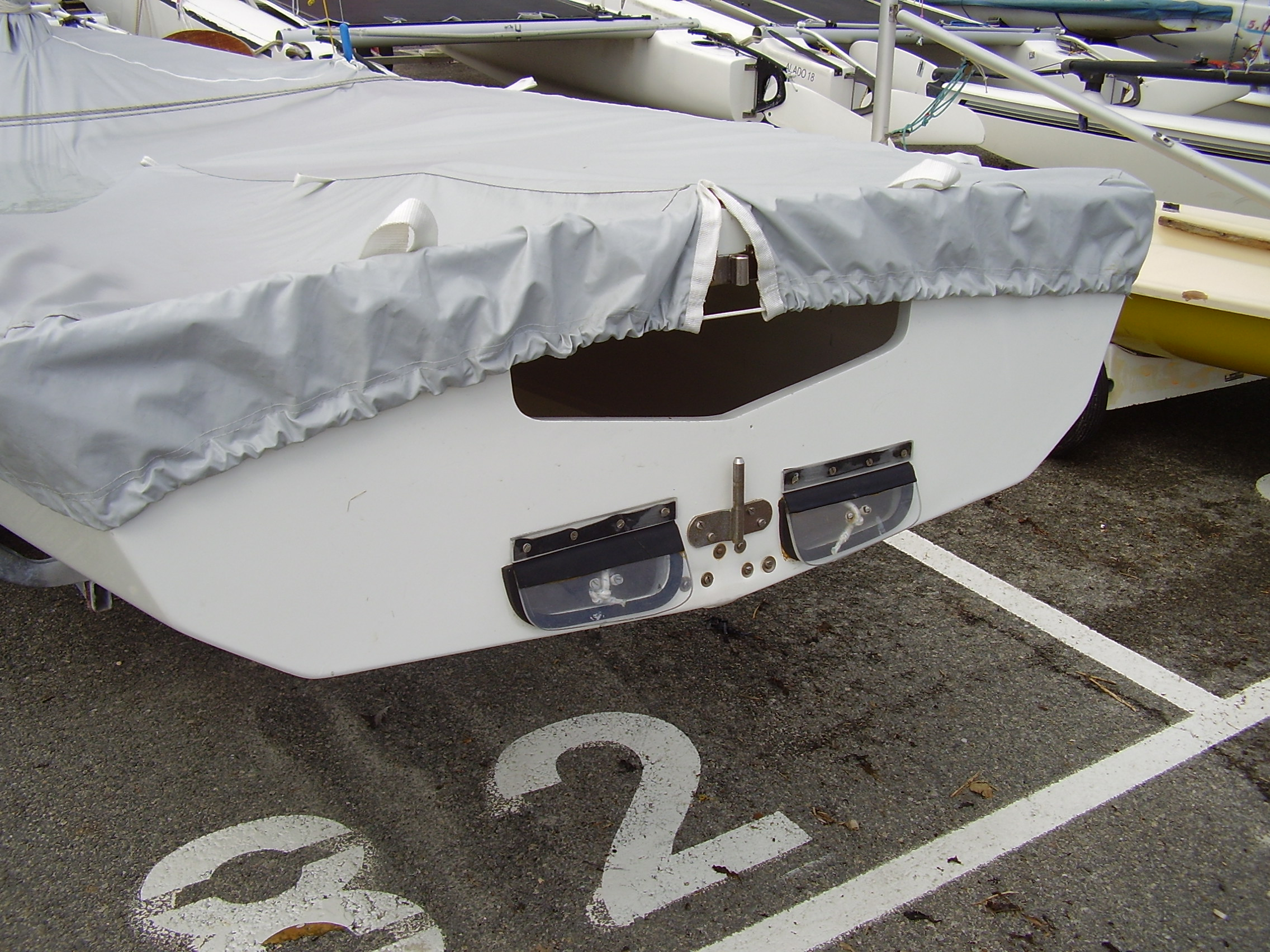
Self bailer, rear type

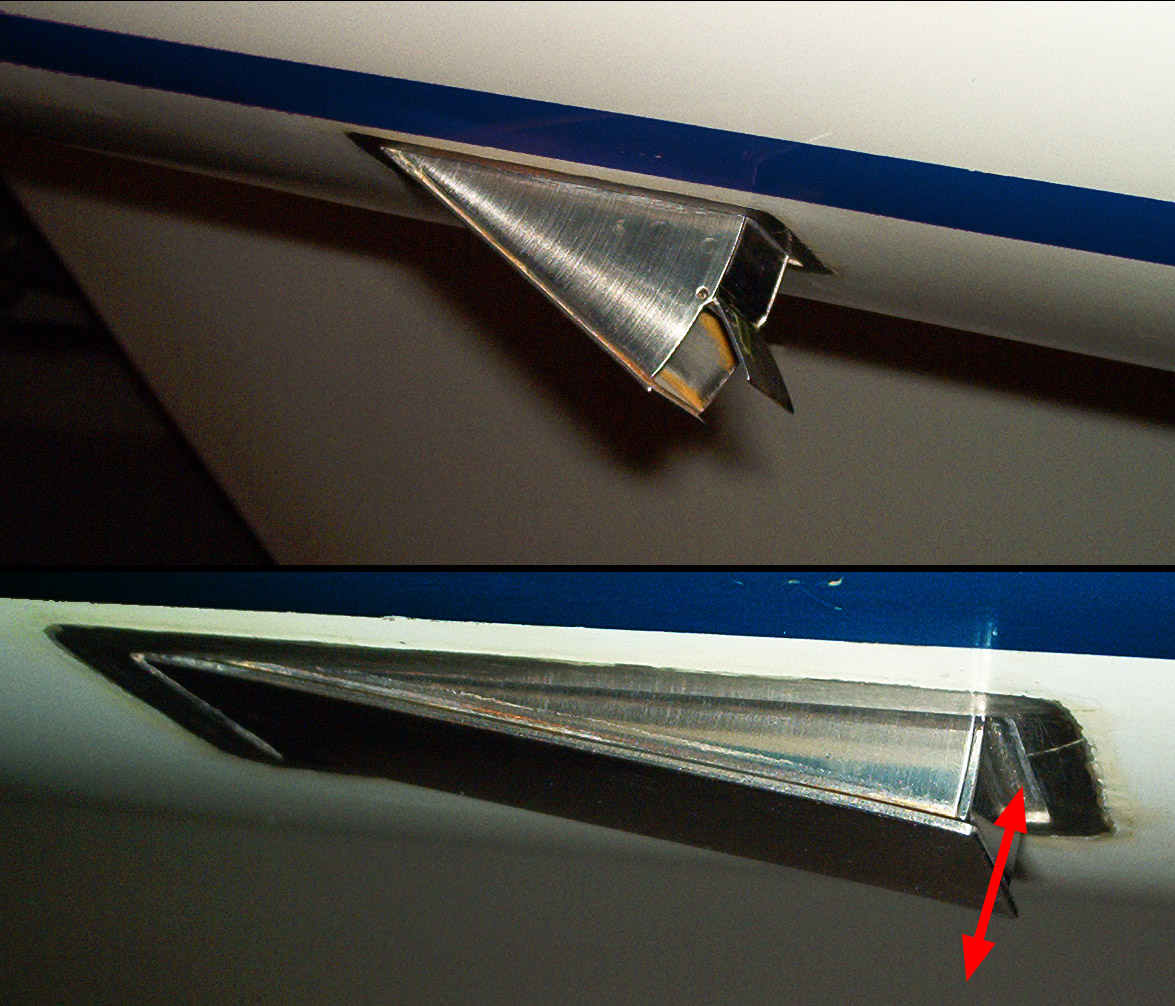
Self bailer, bottom type outside the boat

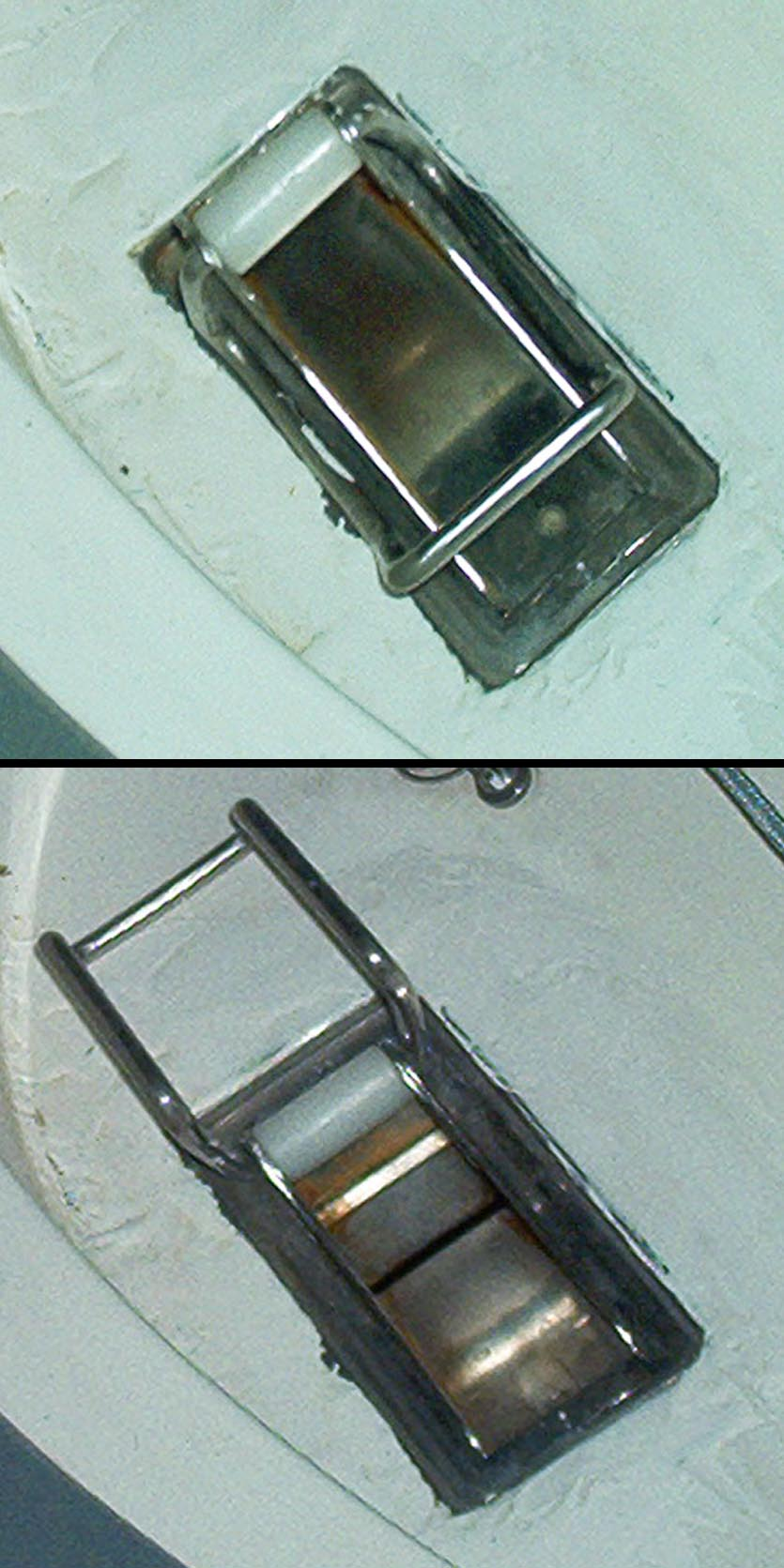
Self bailer, bottom type inside the boat

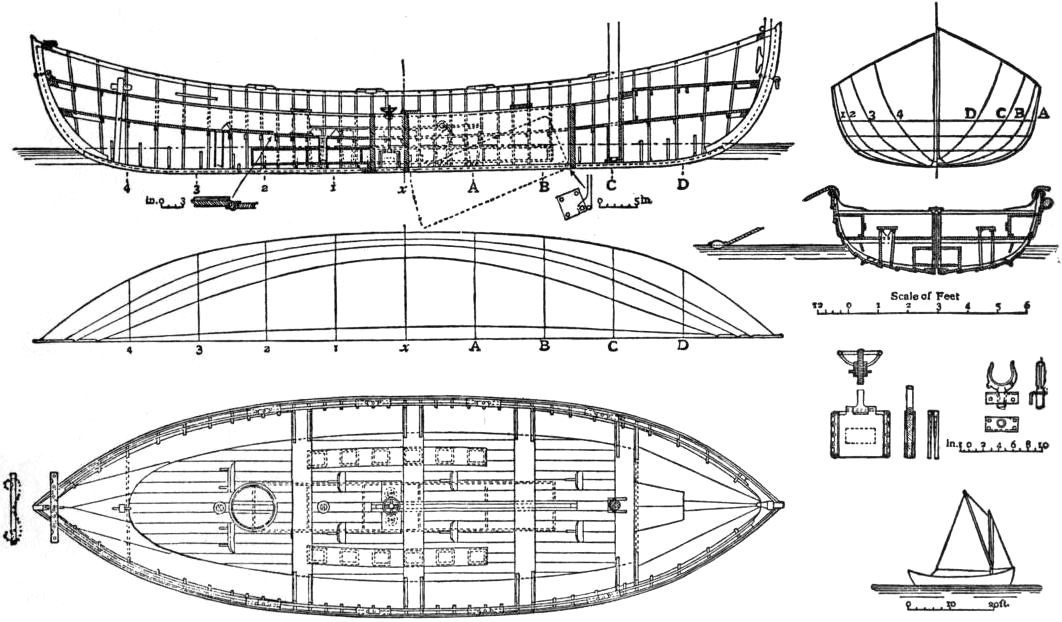
Plans for a 1911 self-bailing lifeboat. Note that the deck is higher than the waterline, so that it can drain.

== See also ==
- Bailer (hydrogeology)
