= Bail (jewelry) =

Jewelry component

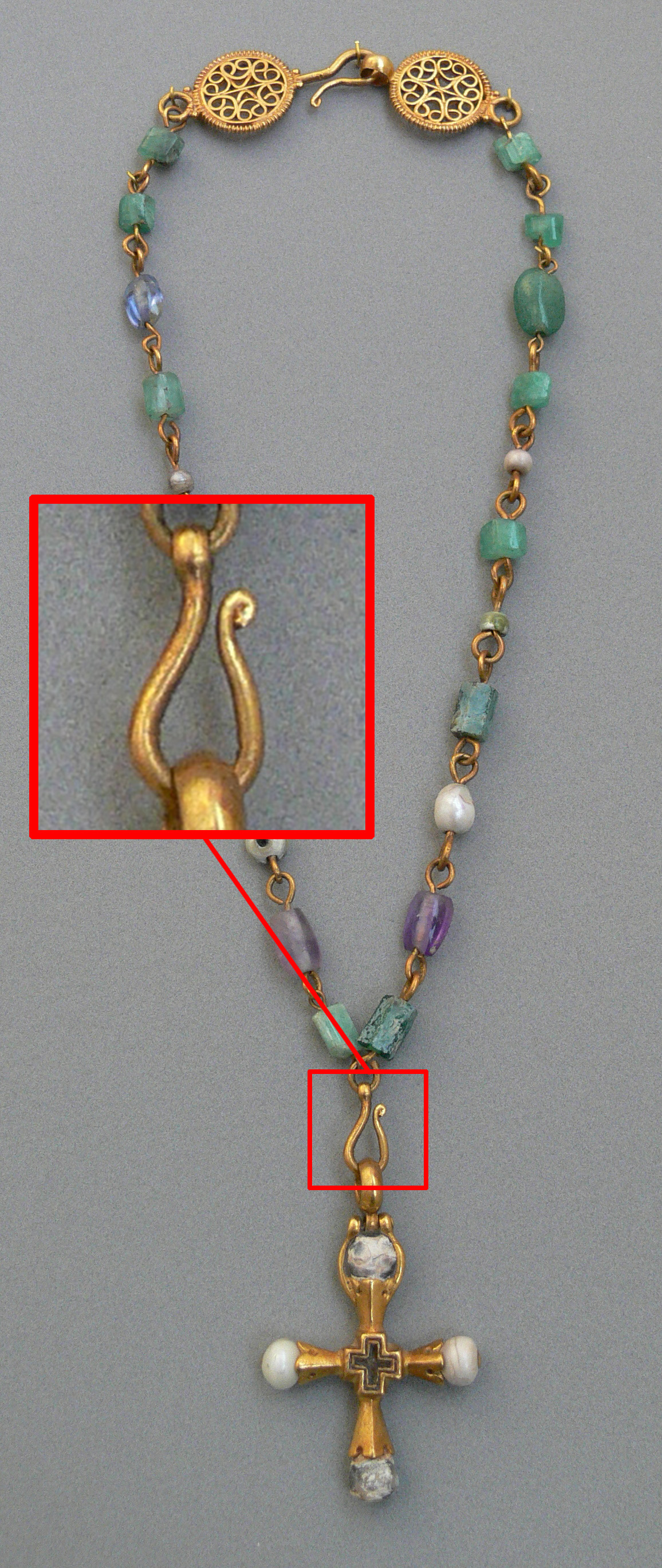
A cross attached to a necklace by means of a curved bail. Sixth or seventh century. From the collection of the Museum of Byzantine Art, Berlin.

A bail (also spelled "bale") is a component of certain types of jewelry, mostly necklaces, that is used to attach a pendant or stone.

== Overview ==
The bail is normally placed in the center of the necklace where the pendant hangs. Some bails are made so a pendant can be attached after the necklace production is completed. This way, a necklace design can be mass-produced for multiple companies and the pendants can be attached after the necklaces are shipped to them.

== Classic bail ==
A classic bail allows the chain to pass through and is connected by a ring to the pendant. Bails are a frequently pre-made component used on an otherwise handmade piece of jewelry.

== Hidden bail ==
A pendant can also be made with a "hidden bail." A hidden bail is typically connected to the back of a pendant in such a way that the chain can pass through and support the pendant, but the bail cannot be seen.

== See also ==
- Jewelry model
