= Bhojasar =

Bhojasar may refer to one of the following villages in Rajasthan, India:

- Bhojasar Bara, Churu
- Bhojasar Bara, Sikar
- Bhojasar, Barmer
- Bhojasar Chhota, Churu
- Bhojasar Chhota, Sikar
- Bhojasar, Jaisalmer
- Bhojasar, Jhunjhunu
- Bhojasar, Phalodi
- Bhojasar, Ratangarh
