= Churu Lok Sabha constituency =

Lok Sabha constituency in Rajasthan

Coordinates: 28.3°N 75.0°E

Churu
- Lok Sabha constituency

Constituency details
- Country: India
- Region: North India
- State: Rajasthan
- Assembly constituencies: Nohar; Bhadra; Sadulpur; Taranagar; Sardarshahar; Churu; Ratangarh; Sujangarh
- Established: 1977
- Reservation: None

Member of Parliament
- 18th Lok Sabha
- Incumbent Rahul Kaswan
- Party: Indian National Congress
- Elected year: 2024

Churu (Hindi pronunciation: [t͡ʃuːɾuː]) is one of the 25 Lok Sabha (parliamentary) constituencies in Rajasthan state in India.

== Assembly segments ==
Presently, Churu Lok Sabha constituency comprises eight Vidhan Sabha (legislative assembly) segments. These are:

#	Name	District	Member	Party	2024 Lead
10	Nohar	Hanumangarh	Amit Chachan	INC	INC
11	Bhadra	Hanumangarh	Sanjeev Beniwal	BJP	BJP
19	Sadulpur	Churu	Manoj Nyangli	SHS	INC
20	Taranagar	Churu	Narendra Budania	INC	INC
21	Sardarshahar	Churu	Anil Kumar Sharma	INC	INC
22	Churu	Churu	Harlal Saharan	BJP	INC
23	Ratangarh	Churu	Poosaram Godara	INC	BJP
24	Sujangarh (SC)	Churu	Manoj Meghwal	INC	INC

=== Assembly Segment wise leads ===
Constituency		Winner				Runner-up				Margin
#	Name	Candidate	Party	Votes	%	Candidate	Party	Votes	%	Margin
10	Nohar	Rahul Kaswan	INC	1,02,712	52.85	Devendra Jhajharia	BJP	85,398	43.94	17,314
11	Bhadra	Devendra Jhajharia	BJP	92,216	49.97	Rahul Kaswan	INC	87,733	47.54	4,483 |
19	Sadulpur	Rahul Kaswan	INC	92,971	56.75	Devendra Jhajharia	BJP	67,334	41.10	25,637
20	Taranagar	Rahul Kaswan	INC	89,783	49.51	Devendra Jhajharia	BJP	86,351	47.67	3,432
21	Sardarshahar	Rahul Kaswan	INC	92,644	51.79	Devendra Jhajharia	BJP	80,630	42.44	12,014
22	Churu	Rahul Kaswan	INC	89,978	53.85	Devendra Jhajharia	BJP	73,026	43.70	16,952
23	Ratangarh	Devendra Jhajharia	BJP	81,000	48.80	Rahul Kaswan	INC	79,535	47.92	1,465
24	Sujangarh (SC)	Rahul Kaswan	INC	83,996	48.81	Devendra Jhajharia	BJP	82,206	47.77	1,790

== Members of Parliament ==
Year	Member	Party
Till 1977 : Constituency did not exist
1977	Daulat Ram Saran	Janata Party
1980	Daulat Ram Saran	Janata Party (Secular)
1984	Mohar Singh Rathore	Indian National Congress
1985^	Narendra Budania	Indian National Congress
1989	Daulat Ram Saran	Janata Dal
1991	Ram Singh Kaswan	Bharatiya Janata Party
1996	Narendra Budania	Indian National Congress
1998	Narendra Budania	Indian National Congress
1999	Ram Singh Kaswan	Bharatiya Janata Party
2004	Ram Singh Kaswan	Bharatiya Janata Party
2009	Ram Singh Kaswan	Bharatiya Janata Party
2014	Rahul Kaswan	Bharatiya Janata Party
2019	Rahul Kaswan	Bharatiya Janata Party
2024	Rahul Kaswan	Indian National Congress

== Election results ==
=== 2024 ===
2024 Indian general election: Churu
Party	Candidate	Votes	%	±%
INC	Rahul Kaswan	728,211	51.12	+16.60
BJP	Devendra Jhajharia	6,55,474	46.01	−13.08
NOTA	None of the above	6656	0.79	+0.04
Majority		72,737	5.11	
Turnout		14,07,716	63.61	−2.29
INC gain from BJP		Swing		

- the turnout does not include postal ballots

=== 2019 ===
2019 Indian general elections: Churu
Party	Candidate	Votes	%	±%
BJP	Rahul Kaswan	792,999	59.69	▲7.06
INC	Rafique Mandelia	4,58,597	34.52	▲18.89
CPI(M)	Balwan Poonia	25,090	1.89	▲0.94
BSP	Hari Singh	16,116	1.21	▼25.38
NOTA	None of the Above	9,978	0.75	▼0.25
Majority		3,34,402	25.17	▼0.87
Turnout		13,30,672	65.90	▲1.41
BJP hold		Swing		

=== 2014 ===
2014 Indian general elections: Churu
Party	Candidate	Votes	%	±%
BJP	Rahul Kaswan	595,756	52.63	▲5.75
BSP	Abhinesh Maharshi	3,01,017	26.59	▲23.39
INC	Pratap Singh	1,76,912	15.63	▼29.70
AAP	Krishan Kumar Saran	13,977	1.23	New
CPI(M)	Indra Singh Jat	10,778	0.95	N/A
NOTA	None of the Above	11,293	1.00	N/A
Majority		2,94,739	26.04	▲24.49
Turnout		11,31,104	64.49	▲12.08
BJP hold		Swing		

=== 2009 ===
2009 Indian general elections: Churu
Party	Candidate	Votes	%	±%
BJP	Ram Singh Kaswan	376,708	46.88	▼1.17
INC	Rafique Mandelia	3,64,268	45.33	▲0.86
BSP	Budh Ram Saini	25,690	3.20	▼0.41
Independent	Salim Gujar	7,257	0.90	N/A
Majority		12,440	1.55	▼2.03
Turnout		8,03,025	52.41	▼8.43
BJP hold		Swing		

=== 2004 ===
2004 Indian general elections: Churu
Party	Candidate	Votes	%	±%
BJP	Ram Singh Kaswan	400,718	48.05	▼3.61
INC	Balram Jakhar	370,864	44.47	▼0.31
BSP	Daulataram Painsiya	30,142	3.61	▲2.11
INLD	Damodar Mishra	10,132	1.21	N/A
Independent	Sufi Sultan	8,594	1.03	N/A
Independent	Sabir Khan	5,146	0.62	N/A
Independent	Ranjeet Rai	3,773	0.45	N/A
Independent	Chimna Ram	2,499	0.30	N/A
Independent	Mohd. Iliyas Khichi	2,108	0.25	N/A
Majority		29,854	3.58	▼3.30
Turnout		833,976	60.84	▲5.52
BJP hold		Swing	▼3.61	

== See also ==
- Churu district
- List of constituencies of the Lok Sabha
