= Raj Kumar Rinwa =

Indian politician

Member of the Rajasthan Legislative Assembly
- In office 2003–2018
- Preceded by: Jaidev Prasad Indoria
- Succeeded by: Abhinesh Maharshi
- Constituency: Ratangarh

Personal details
- Born: 24 June 1953 Ratangarh, Rajasthan
- Party: Bhartiya janta party
- Spouse: Leela devi (m. 1970)

Raj Kumar Rinwa (born 24 June 1953) is an Indian politician of the Bharatiya Janata Party from Churu district in Rajasthan, India. He was a Member of the Rajasthan Legislative Assembly from Ratangarh constituency in 2003, 2008 and 2013.

== Early life ==
Raj Kumar Rinwa was born on 24 June 1953 at Ratangarh in Churu district. His father's name is Prahlad Rai Rinwa and mother's name is Sajna Devi. He has studied B.com and LLB. In 2003, he became MLA for the first time by contesting as an independent from Ratangarh assembly.

== Political career ==
Rinwa has won the assembly elections thrice. In 2003, he contested as an independent and defeated BJP's veteran leader Harishankar Bhabhada and Congress's Pt. Jai Devprasad Indoriya. He became the MLA of Ratangarh for two consecutive terms in 2008 and 2013. In 2013, he was also a minister in Vasundhara Raje's government.
