= Shyodanpura =

Village in Rajasthan

- Village
- Interactive map of Shyodanpura
- Coordinates: 28.3578889°N 75.1488018°E
- Country: India
- State: Rajasthan
- District: Churu

Government
  - Lok Sabha Constituency: Churu
  - Vidhan Sabha Constituency: Churu
  - Panchayat Samiti: Churu
  - Gram Panchayat: Shyodanpura
- PIN: 331002
- Vehicle registration: RJ 10
- Nearest Police Station: Dudhwa Khara
- Nearest Post Office: Ghanghu

Shyodanpura (श्योदानपुरा) is a village located in the Churu tehsil of the Churu district in the state of Rajasthan, India. Shyodanpura became a newly formed gram panchayat in November 2025 by order of the State Government. The village also has a Government Upper Primary School. The nearest police station is located in Dudhwa Khara, and the nearest post office is in Ghanghu.
