= Daulat Ram Saran =

Indian politician (1924–2011)

Union Minister of Urban Development
- In office 21 November 1990 – 21 June 1991
- Prime Minister: Chandra Shekhar
- Preceded by: Murasoli Maran
- Succeeded by: Sheila Kaul

Member of Parliament, Lok Sabha
- In office 1989–1991
- Preceded by: Narendra Budania
- Succeeded by: Ram Singh Kaswan
- Constituency: Churu
- In office 1977–1984
- Succeeded by: Mohar Singh Rathore
- Constituency: Churu

Personal details
- Born: 13 January 1924 Dhani Panchera, Churu district, Rajasthan
- Died: 2 July 2011 (aged 87) Jaipur, Rajasthan, India
- Party: Samajwadi Janata Party (Rashtriya)
- Other political affiliations: Congress (1948–1967); Swatantra Party (1967–1972); Janata Party (1977–1984); Lokdal (1985–1988); Janata Dal (1988–1990)
- Spouse: Jadav Devi

Daulat Ram Saran (13 January 1924 – 2 July 2011) was an Indian politician and freedom fighter. He was well known farmer leader of Rajasthan and follower of Mahatma Gandhi. He represented Churu Lok Sabha constituency three times. He was a Union Minister in Chandra Shekhar cabinet from 1990 to 1991.

== Early life ==
Daulat Ram Saran was born in a Jat family large land owned farmer in Dhani Panchera of Churu district in Rajasthan. He received his primary education at government high school at Sardarshahar. At the age of 16, he participated in a protest against school authorities when one of his teachers was beaten up by some people who were close to school principal.

In 1935, at the age of 11 he was married to Jadav Devi. The couple had 3 sons and 4 daughters. He played a pro-active role in freedom struggles before 1947.

== Political career ==
Daulat Ram Saran was a member of Rajasthan Legislative Assembly from 1957 to 1972. He also served as Deputy minister in Rajasthan government but resigned due to ideological differences with Chief Minister Mohan Lal Sukhadia. After declaration of Emergency by Indira Gandhi, he was arrested under Maintenance of Internal Security Act (MISA) on 27 July 1975. He was jailed for 19 months during the Emergency. He was elected to 6th and 7th Lok Sabha on Janata Party ticket from Churu constituency.

When the Janata Party split, he first remained in Janata Party but later he joined Lok Dal of Ajit Singh. He was elected to 9th Lok Sabha on Janata Dal ticket from Churu constituency. In 1990, he was one of the 64 MPs who left Janata Dal and formed Chandra Shekhar government. He was Minister of Urban Development in Chandra Shekhar cabinet from November 1990 to June 1991.

== Positions held ==
- 1950–1957 President, District Congress Committee (DCC), Churu.
- 1957–1967 Member of Rajasthan Legislative Assembly.
- 1957–1966 Deputy Minister of Agriculture, Animal Husbandry, Cooperatives, Panchayat, Local Self Government and Irrigation in the Government of Rajasthan.
- 1967–1972 Member of Rajasthan Legislative Assembly (3rd term).
- 1977–1979 Member, 6th Lok Sabha.
- 1980–1984 Member, 7th Lok Sabha (2nd term).
- Member of Public Accounts Committee, Estimates Committee and House Committee, 7th Lok Sabha.
- 1989–1991 Member, 9th Lok Sabha (3rd term).
- 1989 Member of Business Advisory Committee of Parliament.
- 1990 Member of Rules Committee, Committee on Public Undertakings, Consultative Committee of Ministry of Commerce and Tourism.

== Death ==
Daulat Ram Saran died on 2 July 2011 at Jaipur. He was survived by two sons and four daughters. He was cremated with full government honours at his hometown in Churu district. Politicians from across the spectrum of Indian parties paid tribute to him and Chief Minister Ashok Gehlot passed a resolution in State Cabinet condoling the death of Saran.
