= Bhojasar, Ratangarh =

Bhojasar
- Village
- Location in Rajasthan, India Bhojasar (India)
- Coordinates: 27.972°N 74.592°E
- Country: India
- State: Rajasthan
- District: Churu

Government
  - Body: Panchayat
- Elevation: 312 m (1,024 ft)

Population (2011)
  - Total: 2,101

Languages
  - Official: Hindi
- Time zone: UTC+5:30 (IST)
- PIN: 331505
- Telephone code: 91-1567
- ISO 3166 code: RJ-IN
- Vehicle registration: RJ-10
- Nearest city: Ratangarh
- Distance from Ratangarh: 15 kilometres (9.3 mi) (land)
- Distance from Churu: 60 kilometres (37 mi) (land)
- Avg. summer temperature: 46-48 °C
- Avg. winter temperature: 0-4 °C

Bhojasar is a village within the Ratangarh administrative region of Churu district, Rajasthan, India. The village lies 15 kilometres (9.3 mi) west of Ratangarh. Bhojasar borders Budhwali, Khotari, Loha, Ratnadesar and Parihara villages.

The 1,563.74 hectares (15.6374 km^{2}) village has an overall population of about 2101 of whom most are Jat ethnic group.
