= Bhojasar Chhota =

Bhojasar Chhota may refer to:

- Bhojasar Chhota, Churu, Churu district, Rajasthan, India
- Bhojasar Chhota, Sikar, Sikar district, Rajasthan, India
