= Taranagar Assembly constituency =

Constituency of the Rajasthan legislative assembly in India

Coordinates: 28.67°N 75.04°E

Taranagar
- Constituency No. 20 for the Rajasthan Legislative Assembly

Constituency details
- Country: India
- Region: North India
- State: Rajasthan
- District: Churu district
- Established: 1977
- Reservation: None

Member of Legislative Assembly
- 16th Rajasthan Legislative Assembly
- Incumbent Narendra Budania
- Party: Indian National Congress

Taranagar Assembly constituency is one of constituencies of Rajasthan Legislative Assembly in the Churu Lok Sabha constituency.

Taranagar constituency covers all voters from Taranagar tehsil, parts of Rajgarh tehsil, which include ILRC Dadarewa, ILRC Dokwa and part of Sardarshahar tehsil, which includes ILRC Ratoosar.

== Members of the Legislative Assembly ==
Year	Name	Party
1977	Mani Ram	Janata Party
1980	Chandan Mal Baid	Indian National Congress
1985	Jai Narayan Poonia	Janata Party
1990	Chandan Mal Baid	Indian National Congress
1993	Chandan Mal Baid	Indian National Congress
1998	Chandan Mal Baid	Indian National Congress
2003	Dr. Chandrashekhar Baid	Indian National Congress
2008	Rajendra Singh Rathore	Bharatiya Janata Party
2013	Jai Narayan Poonia	Bharatiya Janata Party
2018	Narendra Budania	Indian National Congress
2023	Narendra Budania	Indian National Congress

== Election results ==
=== 2023 ===
2023 Rajasthan Legislative Assembly election: Taranagar
Party	Candidate	Votes	%	±%
INC	Narendra Budania	108,236	49.52	+17.57
BJP	Rajendra Singh Rathore	97,891	44.78	+19.87
CPI(M)	Co. Nirmal Kumar	6,815	3.12	−4.4
NOTA	None of the above	867	0.4	+0.03
Majority		10,345	4.74	−2.3
Turnout		218,591	83.04	+7.89
INC hold		Swing		

=== 2018 ===
2018 Rajasthan Legislative Assembly election: Taranagar
Party	Candidate	Votes	%	±%
INC	Narendra Budania	56,968	31.95	
BJP	Rakesh Jangir	44,413	24.91	
Independent	Dr.Chandrashekhar Baid	41,296	23.16	
CPI(M)	Comrade Nirmal Kumar	13,416	7.52	
Independent	Tiloka Ram Kaswan	12,570	7.05	
Kranti Janshakti Party	Anupal Singh	1,625	0.91	
NOTA	None of the above	663	0.37	
Majority		12,555	7.04	
Turnout		178,304	75.15	
INC gain from BJP		Swing		

== See also ==
- List of constituencies of the Rajasthan Legislative Assembly
- Churu district
