= Bhanwar Lal Sharma =

Indian politician (1945–2022)

Member of Rajasthan Legislative Assembly
- In office 2013 – 9 October 2022
- Preceded by: Ashok Kumar Pincha
- Succeeded by: Anil Kumar Sharma
- Constituency: Sardarshahar
- In office 1996–2008
- Preceded by: Narendra Budania
- Constituency: Sardarshahar
- In office 1985–1993
- Preceded by: Mohan Lal
- Constituency: Sardarshahar

Personal details
- Born: 17 April 1950 Sardarshahar, Bikaner State, British India
- Died: 9 October 2022 (aged 77) Jaipur, Rajasthan, India
- Party: Indian National Congress
- Other political affiliations: Lok Dal, Janata Dal
- Spouse: Manohari Devi (m. 1965)
- Children: Anil Kumar Sharma , Keshari Chand Sharma
- Profession: Politician

Bhanwar Lal Sharma (17 April 1945 – 9 October 2022) was an Indian politician. He was a 7th term Member of Legislative Assembly (MLA) from Sardarshahar, Churu, Rajasthan. He emerged as a national figure in the Brahmin Samaj as he was President of All India Brahmin Federation since 2011. He was a Cabinet Minister of Indira Gandhi Neher Pariyojana in Rajasthan Government.

== Early life ==
Bhanwar Lal Sharma, was born on 17 April 1945 at Sardarshahar, and he was the eldest son of Sewak Ram Sharma. He grew up in poverty and left school in the 10th grade. He was later adopted by Maanak Ram Sharma, a family member who at that time, was a sales officer (also known as Jagaati Thanedar). Sharma was married to Mrs. Manohari Devi D/O late Purna Ram Sindoliya who belongs to the village Bhukarka tehsil Nohar. He had two sons, Anil Kumar Sharma and Keshari Chand Sharma and two daughters, Tara Sharma and Indra Sharma.

== Political career ==
Sharma was Sarpanch in the Gram Panchayat of Jaitsisar from 1962 to 1982, Pradhan Panchayat Samiti of Sardarshahar from 1982 to 1985, Member of the Rajasthan Legislative Assembly from 1985 until 2022, Deputy Chief Whip from March 1990 to October 1990, former Cabinet Minister I.G.N.P. Indira Gandhi Canal Pariyojna from 1990 to 1992.

Year	Name	Party affiliation
1985	Bhanwar Lal Sharma	Lok Dal
1989	Bhanwar Lal Sharma	Janata Dal
1995	Bhanwar Lal Sharma	Janata Dal
1998	Bhanwar Lal Sharma	Indian National Congress
2003	Bhanwar Lal Sharma	Indian National Congress
2013	Bhanwar Lal Sharma	Indian National Congress
2018	Bhanwar Lal Sharma	Indian National Congress
