= Bhojasar Bara, Churu =

Bhojasar Bara
- Village
- Location in Rajasthan, India Bhojasar Bara (India)
- Coordinates: 28.68°N 74.18°E
- Country: India
- State: Rajasthan
- District: Churu

Government
  - Body: Panchayat
- Elevation: 249 m (817 ft)

Population (2011)
  - Total: 1,700

Languages
  - Official: Hindi
- Time zone: UTC+5:30 (IST)
- PIN: 331411
- Telephone code: 91-1564
- ISO 3166 code: RJ-IN
- Vehicle registration: RJ-10
- Nearest city: Churu
- Distance from Sardarshahar: 55 kilometres (34 mi) (land)
- Distance from Churu: 110 kilometres (68 mi) (land)
- Avg. summer temperature: 40-44 °C
- Avg. winter temperature: 4-8 °C

Bhojasar Bara or Bara Bhojasar is a village within the Sardarshahar administrative region of Churu district, Rajasthan, India. The village lies 110 kilometres (68 mi) west of Churu and 55 kilometres (34 mi) west from Sardarshahar.

The 4,869 hectares (48.69 km^{2}) village has an overall population of about 1700. Nearby other villages are Bhojasar Chhota (south), Panchara (west), Sumeria (north) and Tolasar (east).
