= Parihara =

Village in Rajasthan, India

Population
  - Total: 11,506

Parihara is a village in Panchayat Ratangarh, Churu district in the Bikaner region of Rajasthan state in North India.

== Governance ==
Ratangarh is the Tehsil and Churu the district of Parihara hamlet. The Churu parliamentary seat and the Ratangarh assembly constituency both include Parihara .

== Education ==
Several government schools operate in the village and a private school was established in 2005.
