= Anil Kumar Sharma =

Anil Kumar Sharma may refer to:

- Anil Kumar Sharma (Delhi politician)
- Anil Kumar Sharma (Rajasthan politician)
