= Rajendra Singh Rathore =

Indian politician

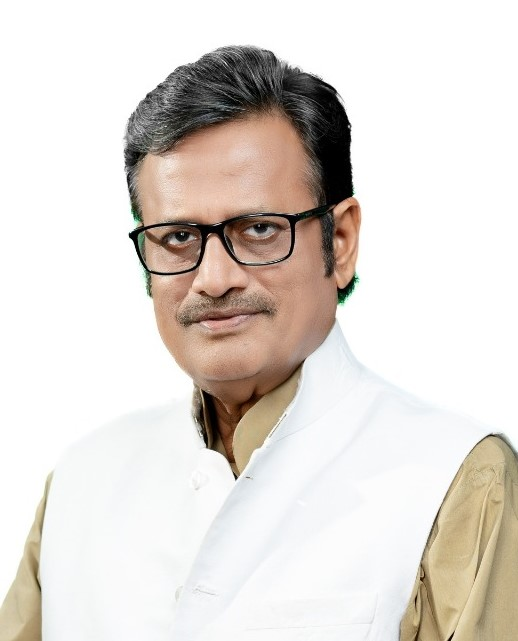

Leader of the Opposition Rajasthan Legislative Assembly
- In office 6 April 2023 – 4 December 2023
- Chief Minister: Ashok Gehlot
- Preceded by: Gulab Chand Kataria
- Succeeded by: Tika Ram Jully

Minister of Rural Development & Panchayat Raj Government of Rajasthan
- In office 10 December 2016 – 17 December 2018
- Chief Minister: Vasundhara Raje
- Preceded by: Surendra Goyal

Minister of Health & Family Welfare Government of Rajasthan
- In office 21 December 2013 – 10 December 2016
- Chief Minister: Vasundhara Raje
- Succeeded by: Kali Charan Saraf

Minister of Parliamentary Affairs Government of Rajasthan
- In office 21 December 2013 – 17 December 2018
- Chief Minister: Vasundhara Raje

Minister of Public Works Department Government of Rajasthan
- In office 31 May 2004 – 10 December 2008
- Chief Minister: Vasundhara Raje
- Preceded by: Gulab Chand Kataria

Minister of Health & Family Welfare Government of Rajasthan
- In office 11 December 1993 – 30 November 1998
- Chief Minister: Bhairon Singh Shekhawat

Member of Rajasthan Legislative Assembly
- In office 2013–2023
- Preceded by: Hazi Maqbool
- Succeeded by: Harlal Saharan
- Constituency: Churu
- In office 2008–2013
- Preceded by: Chandra Shekhar Baid
- Succeeded by: Jai Narayan Poonia
- Constituency: Taranagar
- In office 1990–2008
- Preceded by: Hamida Begum
- Succeeded by: Hazi Maqbool
- Constituency: Churu

Personal details
- Born: 21 April 1955 (age 71) Harpalsar, Rajasthan, India
- Spouse: Chand Kanwar (m. 1978)
- Children: 1
- Education: University of Rajasthan; Dungar College
- Occupation: Politician

Rajendra Rathore (born 21 April 1955) is an Indian politician. A member of the Bharatiya Janata Party, he served as leader of opposition in the Rajasthan Legislative Assembly. He is a former seven term member of the Rajasthan Legislative Assembly from Churu and Taranagar.

== Early life and education ==
Rathore was born on 21 April 1955 in Churu, Rajasthan. He did Master of Arts (M.A.) in 1980, and Bachelor of Laws in 1977 at University of Rajasthan. He was elected as the president of the Student Union at Rajasthan University in 1979.

== Political career ==
He began his political career with the Akhil Bharatiya Vidyarthi Parishad (ABVP) and has been elected seven times to the Rajasthan Legislative Assembly, representing constituencies such as Churu and Taranagar. Over the course of his career, he has served in ministerial positions in Rajasthan governments led by Bhairon Singh Shekhawat and Vasundhara Raje, handling portfolios including parliamentary affairs, rural development, health, and panchayati raj. In 2023, he held the position of Leader of the Opposition in the Rajasthan Assembly.

== Electoral history ==
=== Member of the Rajasthan Legislative Assembly ===
Assembly	Tenure	Constituency	Party
9th	1990 - 1993	Churu	Janata Dal
10th	1993 - 1998	Churu	Bharatiya Janata Party
11th	1998 - 2003	Churu	Bharatiya Janata Party
12th	2003 - 2008	Churu	Bharatiya Janata Party
13th	2008 - 2013	Taranagar	Bharatiya Janata Party
14th	2013 - 2018	Churu	Bharatiya Janata Party
15th	2018 - 2023	Churu	Bharatiya Janata Party

== Positions held ==
=== Positions held in Government of Rajasthan ===
SI No.	Post	Department or Ministry	Tenure
1.	MLA	Deputy Chief Whip	1991 - 1993
2.	Minister of State	Medical and Health, Medical Services (ESI).	1993 - 1998
3.	Cabinet Minister	Public Works Department and Parliamentary Affairs.	2003 - 2008
4.	Cabinet Minister	Medical and Health Services (ESI), Medical Education, Ayurveda & Indian Medical Methods.	2013 - 2016
5.	Cabinet Minister	Rural Development & Panchayati raj and Parliamentary Affairs, Election.	2016 - 2018
6.	MLA	Deputy Leader of the Opposition	2019 - 2023
7.	MLA	Leader of the Opposition	2023
