= Bhanwarlal Meghwal =

Indian politician (1948–2020)

Minister of Social Justice and Empowerment Government of Rajasthan
- In office 24 December 2018 – 16 November 2020
- Chief Minister: Ashok Gehlot
- Preceded by: Arun Chaturvedi, BJP
- Succeeded by: Tika Ram Jully

Member of the Rajasthan Legislative Assembly
- In office 11 December 2018 – 16 November 2020
- Preceded by: Khema Ram Meghwal, BJP
- Succeeded by: Manoj Meghwal, INC
- Constituency: Sujangarh
- In office December 2008 – December 2013
- Preceded by: Khema Ram Meghwal, BJP
- Succeeded by: Khema Ram Meghwal, BJP
- Constituency: Sujangarh
- In office December 1998 – December 2003
- Preceded by: Rameshwar Lal Bhati, BJP
- Succeeded by: Khema Ram Meghwal, BJP
- Constituency: Sujangarh
- In office December 1990 – December 1993
- Preceded by: Chuni Lal Meghwal, BJP
- Succeeded by: Rameshwar Lal Bhati, BJP
- Constituency: Sujangarh
- In office December 1980 – December 1985
- Preceded by: Rawat Ram, Janata Party
- Succeeded by: Chuni Lal Meghwal, BJP
- Constituency: Sujangarh

Minister of Education Government of Rajasthan
- In office 2009–2013
- Chief Minister: Ashok Gehlot
- Preceded by: Kali Charan Saraf, BJP
- Succeeded by: Vasudev Devnani, BJP

Personal details
- Born: 19 November 1948 Sujangarh, Churu, Rajasthan
- Died: 16 November 2020 (aged 72) Medanta Hospital, Gurugram, Haryana
- Party: Indian National Congress
- Spouse: Keshar Devi
- Children: Manoj Meghwal, 2 daughters
- Occupation: Politician

Bhanwarlal Meghwal (19 November 1948 – 16 November 2020) was an Indian politician from the Indian National Congress.

He served as the Cabinet Minister of Social Justice and Empowerment in Government of Rajasthan. He also served as the Education Minister in the Government of Rajasthan.

He was a Member of Rajasthan Legislative Assembly constituency Sujangarh Churu, Rajasthan, serving on 5 different occasions.

Meghwal died on 16 November 2020 after a long illness and brain haemorrhage at the age of 72.
