= Balwan Poonia =

Indian politician

MLA, Rajasthan Legislative Assembly
- In office 2018–2023
- Preceded by: Sanjeev Beniwal
- Constituency: Bhadra

Personal details
- Party: Communist Party of India (Marxist)
- Occupation: Farmer Activist, Agriculturist
- Profession: Politician and Agriculture
- Portfolio: Member of the Legislative Assembly (MLA), Bhadra (Rajasthan) & Joint Secretary Kisan Sabha Rajasthan.

Balwan Poonia is an Indian politician and farmer activist from Bhadra, Rajasthan. He is also an elected member of the 15th Rajasthan Legislative Assembly representing Bhadra constituency as a member of the Communist Party of India (Marxist).

== Political career ==
Poonia is the Joint Secretary of the Rajasthan unit of the All India Kisan Sabha and has been at the forefront of farmers' agitations in the state. He has been involved in fights for lower electricity rates, fairer prices for crops, debt relief, investments in irrigation, as well as insurance and pensions for farmers. In 2018, Poonia led a 58-day fight against the excessive interest charged by State Bank of India to farmers in Chain Bari village in Hanumangarh district. The struggle culminated with Rs. 16,52,000 being refunded to farmers. In the 2018 Rajasthan Legislative Assembly election, Poonia was one of two elected CPI (M) candidates on the strength of farmer mobilization. He won the Bhadra constituency defeating incumbent BJP MLA Sanjeev Kumar by over 23,000 votes.

Poonia ran in the 2019 Indian General elections as the CPI (M) candidate for the Churu Lok Sabha constituency. Poonia finished a distant third with 1.89% of the vote behind the BJP winner, Rahul Kaswan, who won with nearly 60%, and INC's Rafique Mandelia, who got 34.5% of the vote.

In 2020, the CPI(M) suspended its MLA Balwan Poonia from the party for a year. The party has taken suspension action for breaking discipline. CPI(M) state secretary Amraram gave this information. He said that this decision was taken in the meeting of the State Secretariat. Amraram told that party discipline was broken by Poonia in the Rajya Sabha elections, in which he has been held guilty of acting contrary to the decision of the party. Due to this, it has been decided to suspend Balwan Poonia's party membership for one year. Along with this, show cause notice was also given to Balwan Poonia.

== Farmer activism ==
He said the governor should apprise the Centre of the sentiments of farmers from Rajasthan.
