= Chirya =

Village in Haryana, India

Coordinates: 28°28′N 76°16′E

Chirya is a village in Charkhi Dadri District in the State of Haryana, India. Located on Charkhi Dadri-Kanina road, it is under Badhara constituency. The population of this village is approximately 5604. The village famous for its agriculture and army tradition.

== Location ==
The village is located in south-east direction of Charkhi Dadri. It is located at 28°27'N latitude and 76°15'E longitude.

== Geography ==
Average elevation of this village is 217 m.

== Population ==
The total population of village Chirya is 5604. Total number of males is 2908 and that of females is 2696 (according to census 2011) Literacy rate among males is 77.71 and among females is 56.67. For political representational purposes the village is part of Bhadra Assembly constituency and the Bhiwani-Mahendragarh Lok Sabha constituency.
