= Barjangsar =

Barjangsar is a village located in Sardarshahar tehsil of Churu Rajasthan, India. It is located 42 kilometres (26 mi) from the center of Sardarshahar.

== Transportation ==
Barjangsar is well connected to the city through road and haves connecting buses to major cities of Rajasthan and to the national capital New Delhi, Udaipur, Jodhpur, Jaipur, Kota, Ajmer, Bikaner, Ganganagar, Hisar. Public transport have mini buses and private buses and no roadways buses or trains are available in the village.
