= Lakhau =

Lakhau may refer to:

- Lakhau, Assam, a village in Sibsagar district, Assam, India
- Lakhau, Rajasthan, a village in Churu district, Rajasthan, India
