= Karni Singh Rathore =

Recipient of Kirti Chakra

Colonel Karni Singh Rathore KC
- Born: 3 December 1953; Churu, Rajasthan, India
- Died: 2005 (aged 51–52)
- Cause of death: Nose cancer
- Spouse: Asha Rathore
- Relatives: Colonel Mohan Singh Rathore (father); Mohar Singh Rathore (Uncle)
- Military career
- Allegiance: India
- Branch: Indian Army
- Rank: Colonel
- Service number: IC-37049
- Unit: 17 RAJ RIF
- Conflicts: Insurgency in Arunachal Pradesh
- Awards: Kirti Chakra

Colonel Karni Singh Rathore, KC (1953–2005) was an officer in the Indian Army. He was also awarded the Kirti Chakra award for his indomitable courage.

== Military career ==
Col. Karni Singh Rathore was commissioned as an officer in the 7th Rajputana Rifles, in which his father had also served, and rose to command it. At the time of his death he was posted as a member of the Indian Territorial Army, having served previously with the Assam Rifles.

In 1984, he was awarded the Kirti Chakra, the second highest peacetime award for gallantry, in recognition of his service while fighting insurgents.

== Death ==
He died in 2005 after suffering from Nose Cancer.
