= Lohia College =

Government college in Churu, Rajasthan, India

- Motto: Tamaso mā jyotirgamaya (Sanskrit)
- Motto in English: Lead me from darkness to light
- Type: Public
- Established: 1945; 81 years ago
- Founder: Kanhiya Lal Lohia
- Location: Churu, Rajasthan, India; 28°17′27″N 74°58′00″E
- Campus: Urban
- Language: English, Hindi
- Website: www.lcc.ac.in

Lohia College is a government college located in Churu, Rajasthan, India, established in 1945. The Churu District Gazetteer (1970) published by the Government of Rajasthan, records the institution among the higher educational establishments functuning in the district during the mid 20th century.

The college was earlier affiliated with the University of Rajasthan and has been affiliated with Maharaja Ganga Singh University, Bikaner since 2003.

== History ==
The college was founded in 1945 and initially functioned as an intermediate-level institution before gradually expanding its academic programmes. It was later shifted to its present campus in Churu and developed into a degree college offering UG courses in arts, science and commerce.

== Academics ==
The college offers UG and PG programmes in arts, science and commerce under its affiliation with Maharaja Ganga Singh University.

== Notable people ==
- Narendra Budania – alumnus
- Bhanwar Singh Samaur – faculty member
