= Bhukhredi =

Bhukhredi Bhukharedi
- village
- Country: India
- State: Rajasthan

Government
  - Body: Gram panchayat

Languages
  - Official: Hindi
- Time zone: UTC+5:30 (IST)
- ISO 3166 code: RJ-IN

Bhukaredi is a village in Ratangarh tehsil of Churu district in Rajasthan. This village was founded by Bhukar gotra Jats.
