= Subhash Chandra Lakhotia =

Indian biologist (born 1945)

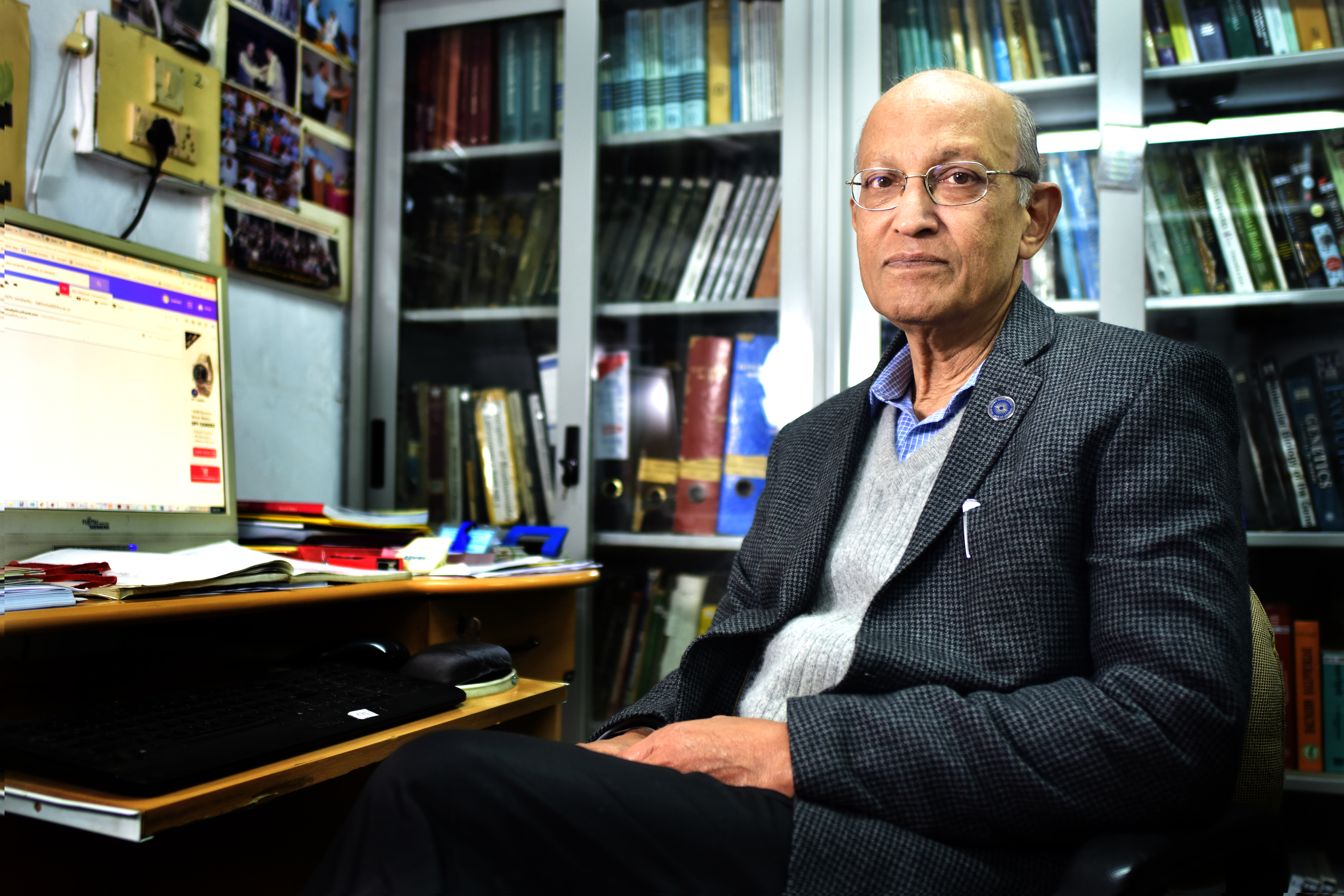
- Born: 4 October 1945 (age 81); Churu, Rajputana Agency, British India
- Education: Calcutta University; Delhi University; University of Edinburgh; University of California, Irvine; Massachusetts Institute of Technology
- Known for: Cellular autonomy of the hyperactive male-X for dosage compensation in Drosophila, lifetime contributions to the long-non-coding RNA 93D or the hsromega gene of Drosophila melanogaster, writings on higher education and research assessment policies
- Awards: 1975 INSA Young Scientists Medal; 1979 UGC Career Award in Sciences; 1989 Shanti Swarup Bhatnagar Prize; 1998 UGC J. C. Bose Award; 2002 INSA Sunder Lal Hora Medal; 2007 BHU Professor CNR Rao Education Foundation Award
- Scientific career
- Fields: Cytogenetics; Cell biology; Developmental biology; Molecular genetics
- Workplaces: Burdwan University; Gujarat University; Banaras Hindu University
- Doctoral advisor: Prof. Ardhendu Shekhar Mukherjee

Subhash Chandra Lakhotia (born 4 October 1945) is an Indian cytogeneticist, academic, Distinguished Professor of Zoology, and the Science & Engineering Research Board (SERB) Distinguished Fellow at the Banaras Hindu University. He is known for his pioneering research on Drosophila with regard to its chromosome organization and replication. A Raja Ramanna fellow of the Department of Science and Technology and the Department of Atomic Energy, he is an elected fellow of all three major Indian science academies: Indian National Science Academy, Indian Academy of Sciences and National Academy of Sciences, India. He is a Senior Fellow of the Cell Stress Society International (USA). The Council of Scientific and Industrial Research, the apex agency of the Government of India for scientific research, awarded him the Shanti Swarup Bhatnagar Prize for Science and Technology, one of the highest Indian science awards, in 1989, for his contributions to biological sciences.

== Biography ==
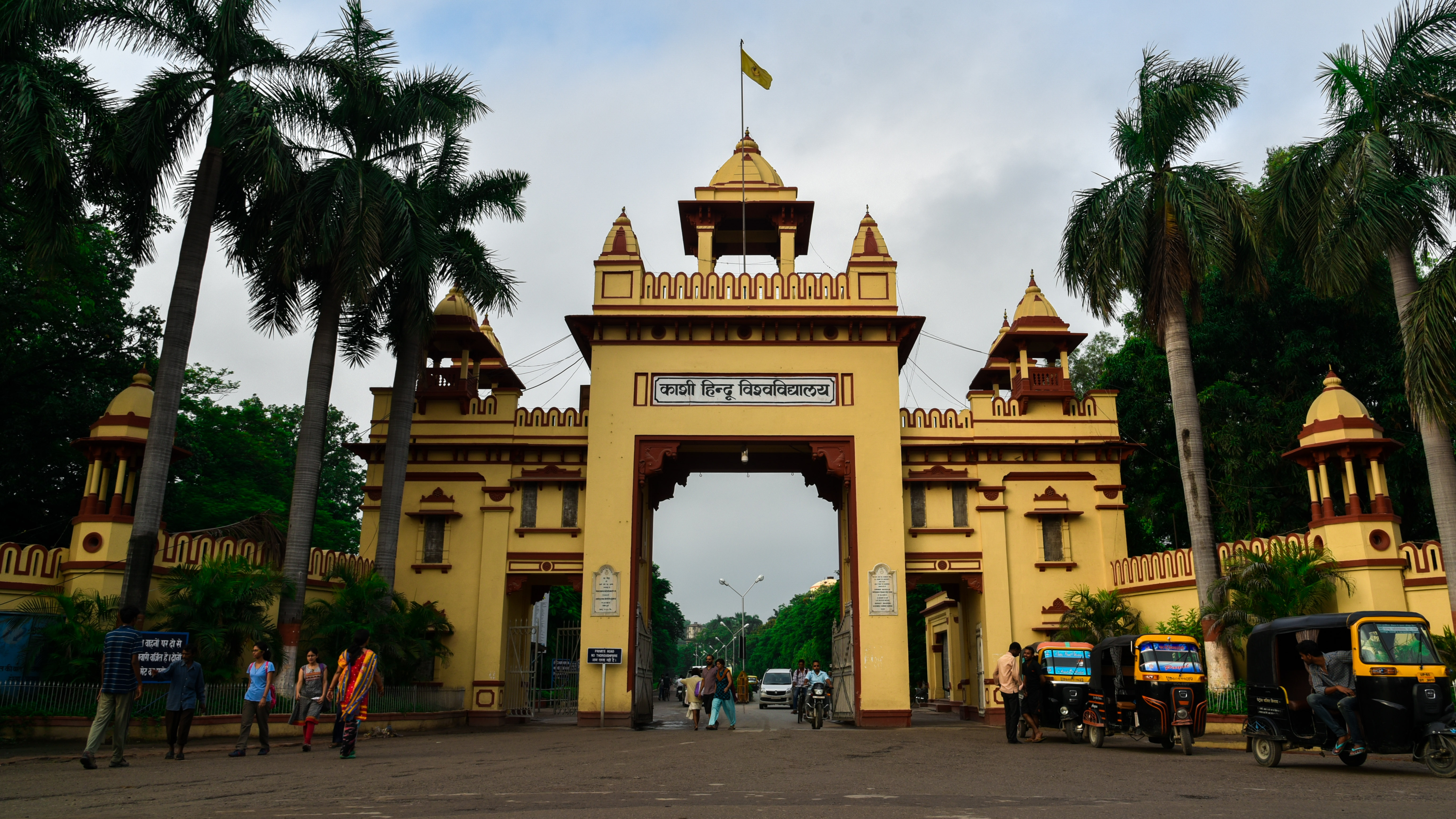
Banaras Hindu University

Subhash Chandra Lakhotia was born on 4 October 1945 in Churu, a city near Thar Desert in the Indian state of Rajasthan, to Dwarka Prasad-Suryakala couple. He did his early schooling in Churu and then in Kolkata.

He graduated from Vidyasagar College of the Calcutta University in Zoology Honours in 1964 before obtaining his master's degree in Zoology and Comparative Anatomy in 1966, both from the Calcutta University. Continuing his doctoral studies at the same university at the Zoology Department, he secured his PhD in 1970. He did his post-doctoral studies at Delhi University during 1970–71 and started his career as a lecturer at Burdwan University in 1971. Moving to Gujarat University in June 1972, he stayed there until September 1976 before joining the Banaras Hindu University as a reader. He became a full professor in 1984 and continued there until superannuation in 2010. In between, he carried out some advanced studies at the Institute of Animal Genetics of the University of Edinburgh during 1972-73, at the University of California, Irvine during 1984-85 and at Massachusetts Institute of Technology, Cambridge in 1985. After his formal superannuation, he continued his academic activities at the Banaras Hindu University as Emeritus Professor, INSA senior scientist from January 2017 to January 2019 and is now working as the life-long Distinguished Professor and SERB Distinguished Fellow.

== Legacy ==
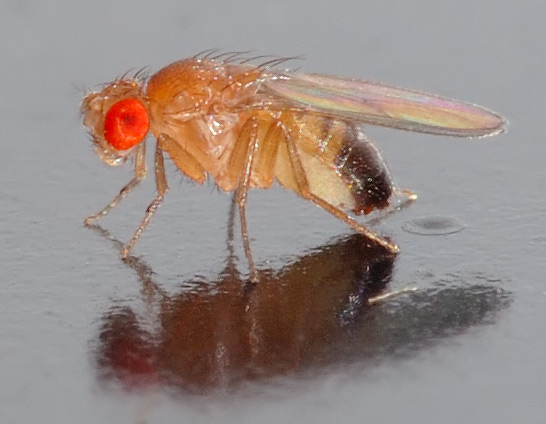
Drosophila melanogaster

Lakhotia's research is focused on cytogenetics, gene expression, cell and developmental biology. He carried out pioneering research on Drosophila (fruit flies) with regards to its chromosome organization and replication, tissue-specific differences in expression of heat shock proteins, and discovery of Hsp60 in Drosophila. He has carried out life-time studies on the organization and functions of the 93D or the hsromega gene long-non-coding RNA locus of Drosophila melanogaster. During his doctoral studies on dosage compensation in Drosophila he further confirmed the hyperactive male-X model and elucidated its cellular autonomy. His discovery of active transcription in heterochromatin in Drosophila in early 1970s was one of the first documentations of transcriptional activity of heterochromatin. His later studies revealed the existence of two distinct replicon types in different cell types of Drosophila.

He has been a pioneer researcher studying the long non-coding RNAs since 1980s and has contributed significantly to a wider appreciation of their function through sustained studies on the hsromega gene. His laboratory discovered the omega speckles in Drosophila nuclei and established essential functions of the lncRNAs produced by the hsromega gene in organization of the intra-nuclear omega speckles. His studies also helped identify how this lncRNA gene modulates apoptosis and neurodegeneration in Drosophila models of human diseases.

Since 2008, he established Drosophila as a good model to understand the mechanisms of actions of some of the ayurvedic formulations. His studies indicate that the Ayurvedic Amalaki Rasayana and Rasa-Sindoor can substantially suppress neurodegeneration associated with polyQ and Alzheimer's disorders.

He has published more than 200 original research papers, review articles, and chapters in books, available at PubMed, an online repository of medical articles, and at ResearchGate. He has also written more than 100 articles relating to policies on higher education, research publications, their assessment and ethics.

He has mentored more than 35 scholars in their doctoral studies.

Lakhotia contributed to the establishment of the Department of Molecular and Human Genetics at the Banaras Hindu University and to the installation of the Confocal microscope facility at his department.

Besides his research contributions, Lakhotia is also well known for his many writings on education. He served as a member of one of the sub-committees of the National Knowledge Commission, participated in the Committee on Science Education of the International Council for Science (ICSU) in 2010 and was a member of its review panel. He was associated with the International Union of Biological Sciences, as a member of its executive committee from 2000 to 2003 and later as its vice president from 2003 to 2006. He is a former member of the INSA council, a former vice president, and vice president of its Inter-Academy Exchange Committee. He was the editor-in-chief of its journal (Proceedings of the Indian National Science Academy) from January 2014 to December 2018. He has been associated with the Council of Scientific and Industrial Research, University Grants Commission of India, Department of Atomic Energy, Department of Science and Technology and Department of Biotechnology as a member of their various committees, and has served or is continuing as a member of the editorial boards of journals such as Current Science, Journal of Biosciences, RNA Biology, Cell Stress and Chaperones and Annals of Neurosciences. He is a life member of the Indian Society of Cell Biology, Indian Society of Developmental Biology, Cell Stress Society International, Genetics Society of America and RNA Society.

== Awards and honors ==
Lakhotia received the Young Scientists Medal of the Indian National Science Academy in 1975 and the Career Award in Sciences of the University Grants Commission of India (UGC) in 1979. The Council of Scientific and Industrial Research awarded him the Shanti Swarup Bhatnagar Prize, one of the highest Indian science awards, in 1989, the same year that he was selected as the National Lecturer by the UGC. The Commission honored him again in 1998 with the J.C. Bose Award, and he received INSA Sunder Lal Hora Medal in 2002. The Banaras Hindu University gave him the 2007 Professor CNR Rao Education Foundation Award.

Lakhotia has held the Ramanna fellowship of the Department of Science and Technology from 2009 and the Raja Ramanna Fellowship of the Department of Atomic Energy from 2011. He held the Jawaharlal Nehru Birth Centenary Fellowship and the Senior Scientist position of the Indian National Science Academy in 2009. He was elected as a fellow by the Indian National Science Academy in 1993, by the Indian Academy of Sciences in 1994 and by the National Academy of Sciences, India in 2002. He was awarded the Joy Gobind Law Memorial Medal ij 2022 by the Asiatic Society, Kolkata.

He has delivered several award lectures, including the 18th G.J.S. Rao Memorial Award Lecture of the Indian Institute of Science in 2011, the Arya Bhatta Medal lecture of the Indian National Science Academy (2018) and the IASTAM Zandu International (Indian Citizen) Award for Excellence in Field of Ayurveda and/or Natural Products Award 2019. In 2019, he was awarded the SERB Distinguished Fellowship (2019).

== See also ==
- Gene expression
