= Sardarshahar Assembly constituency =

Constituency of the Rajasthan legislative assembly in India

Coordinates: 28.4°N 74.5°E

Sardarshahar
- Constituency No. 21 for the Rajasthan Legislative Assembly

Constituency details
- Country: India
- Region: North India
- State: Rajasthan
- District: Churu district
- Established: 1951
- Reservation: None

Member of Legislative Assembly
- 16th Rajasthan Legislative Assembly
- Incumbent Anil Kumar Sharma
- Party: Indian National Congress
- Elected year: 2023

Sardarshahar Assembly Constituency is one of constituencies of Rajasthan Legislative Assembly in the Churu Lok Sabha constituency. Current MLA of Sardarshahar constituency is Anil Kumar Sharma of INC.

== Members of the Legislative Assembly ==
Election	Name	Party
1952	Chandan Mal Baid	Indian National Congress
1957	Chandan Mal Baid	Indian National Congress
1962	Chandan Mal Baid	Indian National Congress
1967	Roop Singh Rajvi	Independent
1972	Chandan Mal Baid	Indian National Congress
1977	Hajari Mal Saran	Janata Party
1980	Mohan Lal Sharma	Bharatiya Janata Party
1982^	Keshri Chand Bohara	Indian National Congress
1985	Bhanwar Lal Sharma	Lok Dal
1990	Bhanwar Lal Sharma	Janata Dal
1993	Narendra Budania	Indian National Congress
1996^	Bhanwar Lal Sharma	Janata Dal
1998	Bhanwar Lal Sharma	Indian National Congress
2003	Bhanwar Lal Sharma	Indian National Congress
2008	Ashok Kumar Pincha	Bharatiya Janata Party
2013	Bhanwar Lal Sharma	Indian National Congress
2018	Bhanwar Lal Sharma	Indian National Congress
2022^	Anil Kumar Sharma	Indian National Congress
2023	Anil Kumar Sharma	Indian National Congress

^By-Poll

== Election results ==
=== 2023 ===
2023 Rajasthan Legislative Assembly election: Sardarshahar
Party	Candidate	Votes	%	±%
INC	Anil Kumar Sharma	99,582	42.27	−4.04
Independent	Rajkaran Chaudhary	77,250	32.79	
BJP	Rajkumar Rinwa	52,538	22.3	−15.84
BSP	Om Prakash	2,135	0.91	−2.38
NOTA	None of the above	1,401	0.59	−0.84
Majority		22,332	9.48	+1.31
Turnout		235,583	77.03	+0.64
INC gain from		Swing		

=== 2022 ===
2022 by-election: Sardarshahar
Party	Candidate	Votes	%	±%
INC	Anil Kumar Sharma	91,357		
BJP	Ashok Kumar Pincha	64,505		
Majority				
Turnout				
INC gain from		Swing		

=== 2018 ===
2018 Rajasthan Legislative Assembly election: Sardarshahar
Party	Candidate	Votes	%	±%
INC	Bhanwar Lal Sharma	95,282	46.31	
BJP	Ashok Kumar	78,466	38.14	
RLP	Baldev	10,273	4.99	
BSP	Omakar	6,762	3.29	
CPI(M)	Comrade Chhagan Lal Choudhary	3,516	1.71	
CPI	Hira Lal	3,327	1.62	
Independent	Bhupendra Singh	1,865	0.91	
NOTA	None of the above	2,943	1.43	
Majority		16,816	8.17	
Turnout		205,747	76.39	
INC gain from		Swing		

== See also ==
- Member of the Legislative Assembly (India)
