= Bhojasar Chhota, Churu =

Bhojasar Chhota
- Village
- Location in Rajasthan, India Bhojasar Chhota (India)
- Coordinates: 28.650°N 74.200°E
- Country: India
- State: Rajasthan
- District: Churu

Government
  - Body: Panchayat
- Elevation: 249 m (817 ft)

Population (2011)
  - Total: 3,436

Languages
  - Official: Hindi
- Time zone: UTC+5:30 (IST)
- PIN: 331505
- Telephone code: 91-1564
- ISO 3166 code: RJ-IN
- Vehicle registration: RJ-10
- Nearest city: Churu
- Distance from Sardarshahar: 55 kilometres (34 mi) (land)
- Distance from Churu: 107 kilometres (66 mi) (land)
- Avg. summer temperature: 40-44 °C
- Avg. winter temperature: 4-8 °C

Bhojasar Chhota or Chhota Bhojasar is a village within the Sardarshahar administrative region of Churu district, Rajasthan, India. The village lies 107 kilometres (66 mi) west of Churu and 55 kilometres (34 mi) west from Sardarshahar.

The 4,303 hectares (43.03 km^{2}) village has an overall population of about 3436. Nearby other villages are Bhojasar Bara (north), Panchara (west), Rajasar (sourh) and Ransisar (east).
