= Bhadra Assembly constituency =

Constituency of the Rajasthan legislative assembly in India

Coordinates: 29.10°N 75.17°E

Bhadra
- Constituency No. 11 for the Rajasthan Legislative Assembly

Constituency details
- Country: India
- Region: North India
- State: Rajasthan
- District: Hanumangarh
- Lok Sabha constituency: Churu
- Established: 1951
- Reservation: None

Member of Legislative Assembly
- 16th Rajasthan Legislative Assembly
- Incumbent Sanjeev Beniwal
- Party: Bharatiya Janata Party
- Elected year: 2023

Bhadra Assembly constituency is one of constituencies of Rajasthan Legislative Assembly in the Churu Lok Sabha constituency.

Bhadra constituency covers all voters from Bhadra tehsil and part of Nohar tehsil, which includes ILRC Ramgarh.

== Members of the Legislative Assembly ==
Year	Name	Party
1952	Hans Raj Arya	Indian National Congress
1957	Ram Kishan Bhambu	Independent politician
1962	Hardatt Singh Beniwal	Independent politician
1967	Hans Raj Arya	Indian National Congress
1972	Gyan Singh Choudhary	Indian National Congress
1977	Lal Chand	Janata Party
1980	Gyan Singh Choudhary	Indian National Congress
1985	Lal Chand	Lok Dal
1990	Lal Chand	Janata Dal
1993	Gyan Singh Choudhary	Independent
1998	Sanjeev Kumar	Indian National Congress
2003	Suresh Chaudhary	Independent politician
2008	Jaideep	Independent politician
2013	Sanjeev Beniwal	Bharatiya Janata Party
2018	Balwan Poonia	Communist Party of India (Marxist)
2023	Sanjeev Beniwal	Bharatiya Janata Party

== Election results ==
=== 2023 ===
2023 Rajasthan Legislative Assembly election: Bhadra
Party	Candidate	Votes	%	±%
BJP	Sanjeev Beniwal	102,748	44.68	▲15.47
CPI(M)	Balwan Poonia	101,616	44.19	▲3.52
Independent	Rajender Prasad Jalandhra	8,257	3.59	
Independent	Bajrang Saharan	4,882	2.12	
INC	Ajeet Singh Beniwal	3,771	1.64	▼16.95
AAP	Roopnath	2,252	0.98	
NOTA	None of the above	1,130	0.49	▼0.65
Majority		1,132	0.49	▼10.97
Turnout		229,969	83.21	▲2.71
BJP gain from CPI(M)		Swing		

=== 2018 ===
2018 Rajasthan Legislative Assembly election: Bhadra
Party	Candidate	Votes	%	±%
CPI(M)	Balwan Poonia	82,204	40.67	
BJP	Sanjeev Beniwal	59,051	29.21	
INC	Dr Suresh Choudhari	37,574	18.59	
BSP	Roop Nath	15,581	7.71	
NOTA	None of the above	2,300	1.14	
Majority		23,153	11.46	
Turnout		202,136	80.5	
CPI(M) gain from BJP		Swing		

== See also ==
- Member of the Legislative Assembly (India)
