= Suchitra Arya =

Indian politician from Rajasthan

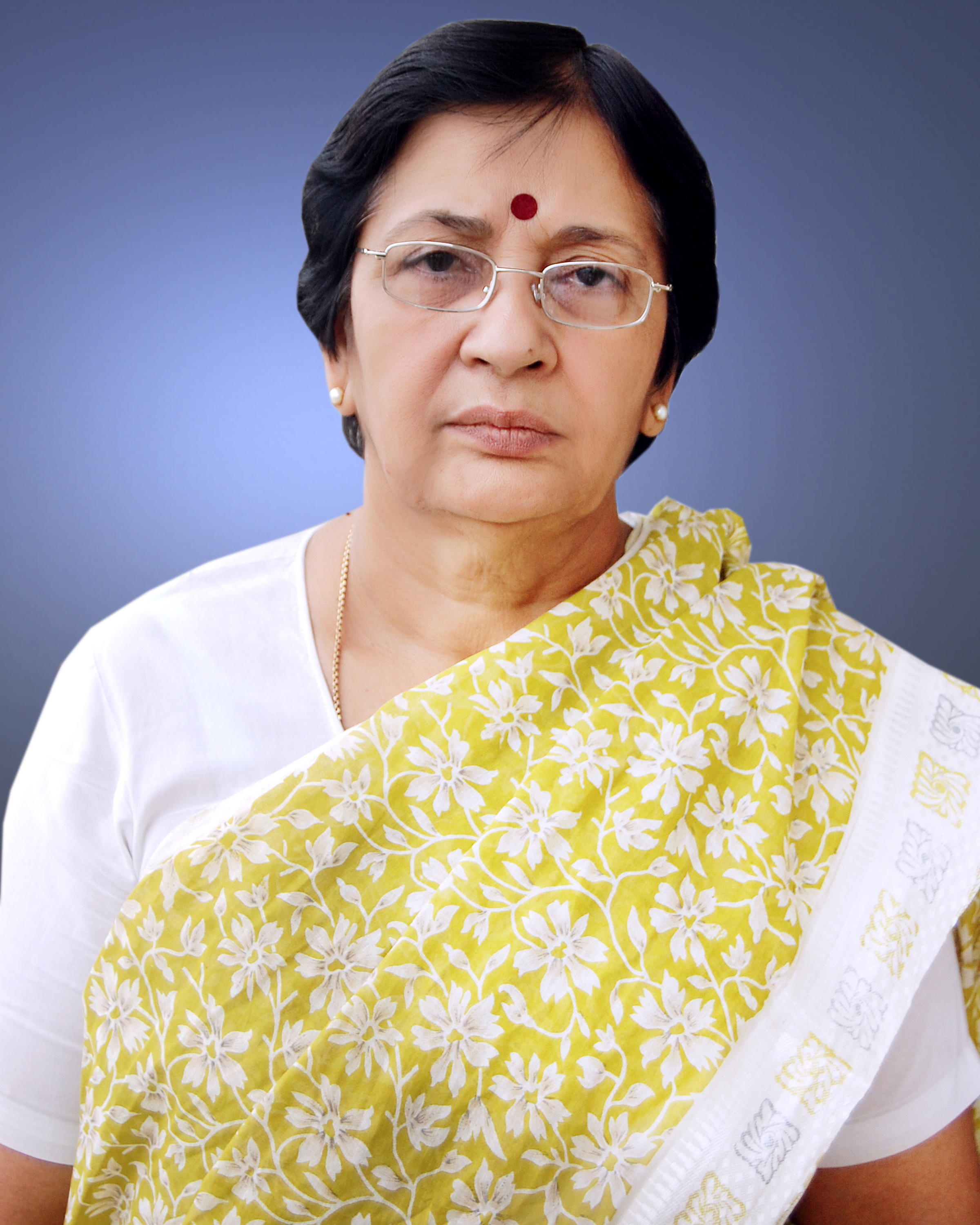
- Suchitra Arya

Member of the Rajasthan Legislative Assembly
- In office 1990–1993
- Constituency: Nohar

Vice Chairperson, Rajasthan State Agro Industries Development Board
- In office April 2022 – December 2023
- In office 1998–2003

Personal details
- Party: Indian National Congress

Suchitra Arya is an Indian politician and educationist from Rajasthan. She has been associated with the Indian National Congress and served twice as a Member of the Rajasthan Legislative Assembly from the Nohar constituency. Arya is the daughter-in-law of freedom fighter and farmer leader Kumbha Ram Arya.

== Political career ==
Arya contested the Rajasthan Legislative Assembly elections from the Nohar constituency for the first time in 1990 and was elected as a Member of the Legislative Assembly (MLA). She was re-elected from the same constituency in 1998 as the Indian National Congress candidate.

She again contested as the Congress candidate from Nohar in the 2003 Rajasthan Legislative Assembly elections but was not elected. Arya contested again from Nohar in the 2008 elections as the Congress candidate.

== Party roles ==
Arya has held organisational positions within the Indian National Congress, including:

- General Secretary, Rajasthan Pradesh Congress Committee (RPCC)
- Member, All India Congress Committee (AICC)

== Government position ==
In April 2022, Arya was appointed as the Vice Chairperson of the Rajasthan State Agro Industries Development Board by the Government of Rajasthan. She held this position until December 2023.

== Educational and social work ==
Arya has been active in the field of rural education for over 45 years. She has been associated with Keshwanand Gramotthan Vidyapeeth, Mahajan, located in Mahajan village, Lunkaransar tehsil, Bikaner district, serving as the Chairperson of the Keshwanand Gramotthan Vidyapeeth Samiti.

== Family background ==
Arya is the daughter-in-law of Kumbha Ram Arya, a freedom fighter, farmer leader and former Revenue Minister of Rajasthan. Additional genealogical details appear in community archives.

== Electoral history ==
- 1990 - Won
- 1998 - Won
- 2003 – Contested, Nohar (INC)
- 2008 – Contested, Nohar (INC)
