= Ashok Kumar Pincha =

Indian politician

Rajasthan Legislative Assembly
- In office 2008–2013
- Constituency: Sardarshahar

Personal details
- Born: Sardarshahar, Rajasthan, India
- Party: Bharatiya Janata Party
- Spouse: Smt. Sushma Pincha
- Children: 2
- Parent: Jatan Lal (father)
- Education: (B.Com) Rajasthan University in 1980
- Occupation: Business

Ashok Kumar Pincha is an Indian politician. He was an elected member of Rajasthan Legislative Assembly representing Sardarshahar constituency as a member of Bharatiya Janata Party.
