= Rahul Kaswan =

Indian politician

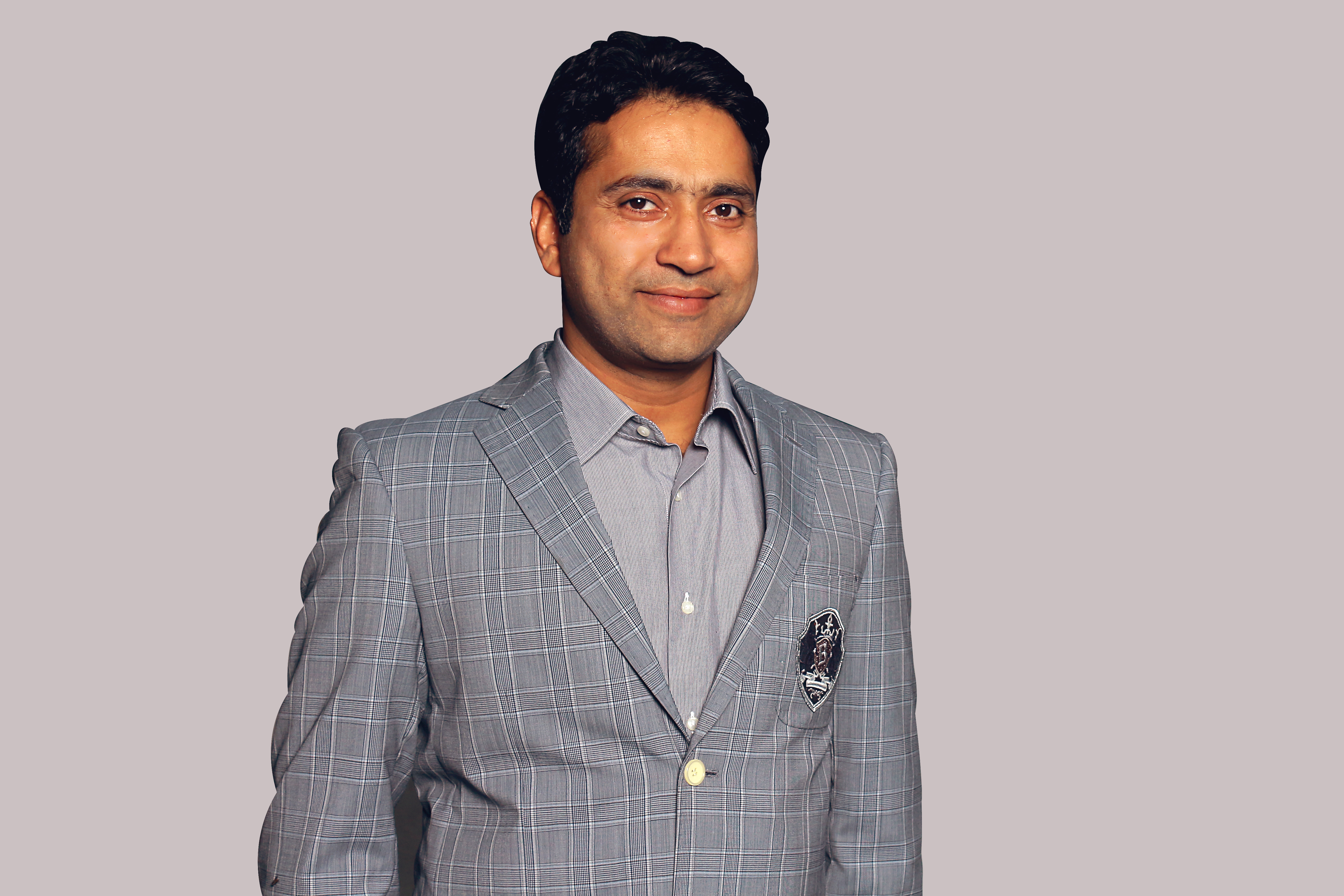

Member of Parliament, Lok Sabha
- Incumbent
- Assumed office 2014
- Preceded by: Ram Singh Kaswan
- Constituency: Churu

Personal details
- Born: January 20, 1977 (age 49)
- Party: Indian National Congress (2024–present)
- Other political affiliations: Bharatiya Janata Party (2014–2024)
- Parent: Ram Singh Kaswan

Rahul Kaswan (born 20 January 1977) is an Indian politician. A member of the Indian National Congress, he serves as Member of Parliament, Lok Sabha from Churu. Previously, he was also elected to the Lok Sabha in 2014 and 2019 general elections as a member of the Bharatiya Janata Party.

== Early life ==
He was born to Ram Singh Kaswan, a former MP from Churu and his grandfather Deep Chand Kaswan served as an MLA from Sadulpur.

== Political career ==
Ram Singh Kaswan got a ticket for his son Rahul Kaswan in his own place and fielded him in the elections. He won in the 2014 election and 2019 election in Modi wave. However, in 2024, the party denied him the ticket. The MP then left the party and joined Indian National Congress. Later Won 2024 election on Congress ticket in Anti BJP wave in the region.

== Electoral performance ==
=== 2024 Lok Sabha Election ===
2024 Indian general election – Churu
Party	Candidate	Votes	%	±%
INC	Rahul Kaswan	728,211	51.12	
BJP	Devendra Jhajharia	655,474	46.01	

=== 2019 Lok Sabha Election ===
2019 Indian general election – Churu
Party	Candidate	Votes	%	±%
BJP	Rahul Kaswan	792,999	59.69	
INC	Rafique Mandelia	458,597	34.52	

=== 2014 Lok Sabha Election ===
2014 Indian general election – Churu
Party	Candidate	Votes	%	±%
BJP	Rahul Kaswan	595,756	52.67	
BSP	Abhinesh Maharshi	301,017	26.61	
