= Jai Narayan Poonia =

Indian politician (1934–2021)

Member of the Rajasthan Legislative Assembly
- In office 2013–2018
- Constituency: Taranagar

Member of the Rajasthan Legislative Assembly
- In office 1985–1990
- Constituency: Taranagar

Member of the Rajasthan Legislative Assembly
- In office 1977–1980
- Constituency: Sadulpur

Cabinet Minister, Government of Rajasthan
- In office 1978–1980

Personal details
- Born: 1934 Lakhlan Choti, Churu district, Rajasthan, India
- Died: 7 November 2021 (aged 86–87)
- Party: Janata Party; Janata Dal; Indian National Lok Dal; Bharatiya Janata Party
- Occupation: Politician; advocate

Jai Narayan Poonia (1934 – 7 November 2021) was a Cabinet Minister and leader of Rajasthan in India. He served as Minister of Public Works.

== Early life and education ==
He was born in village Lakhlan Choti of district Churu in Rajasthan, into the family of Choudhary Jagmal Poonia of the Hindu Jat clan. He was married to Manbhari Devi.

Poonia graduated from Government High School Sangria with First Division. He completed law school and started his career as an advocate in Rajgarh district court.

== Political career ==
Poonia entered elections from the Sadulpur Constituency in Rajasthan in 1977 as Janata Party candidate and became PWD Minister. In 1985 he became MLA from Tara Nagar. He was the runner-up in 2003 and 1998 polls. He was a member of the Indian National Lok Dal party (INLD). In the 1998 polls, he secured almost 45% votes for this seat. His popularity declined and in 2003, he secured only 33%. In both the elections he was defeated by Indian National Congress candidates.

In western terms, he can be roughly categorized as a populist agrarian leader who is ready to adopt a market economy for the benefit of the "kissan" or peasant.

1977-80: Member of Rajasthan Legislative Assembly (MLA) Sadulpur Churu Vidhan Sabha for the Janata Party.

1978-80: Cabinet Minister in Rajasthan. He oversaw departments including Public Welfare Department(PWD), Disaster Management and Flood management.

1980-89: State Vice President of Janata Party in Rajasthan.

1985-90: Member of Rajasthan Legislative Assembly (MLA) Taranagar Churu Vidhan Sabha for the Janata Party.

1990-98: State Vice President of Janata Dal in Rajasthan.

2003-2008: State President of Indian National Lok Dal in Rajasthan.

2013- Won the state assembly election from Taranagar constituency contesting on BJP ticket by 11,136 votes

== Death ==
He died on 7 November 2021 due to a cardiac arrest.
