= Sardar Shahar railway station =

Railway station in Rajasthan, India

Sardarshahar

General information
- Location: Sardar Shahar, Churu district, Rajasthan; India
- Coordinates: 28.437668°N 74.478393°E
- Elevation: 245 metres (804 ft)
- System: Indian Railways station
- Owner: Indian Railways
- Operator: North Western Railway
- Line: Ratangarh–Sardar Shahar line
- Platforms: 1
- Tracks: 1

Construction
- Structure type: Standard (on ground station)
- Parking: Yes
- Accessible: Yes

Other information
- Status: Single diesel line
- Station code: SRDR
- Zone(s): North Western Railway
- Division(s): Bikaner

History
- Opened: 1916
- Rebuilt: 2017
Location
- Location within India Location within Rajasthan

Sardar Shahar railway station is a railway station in Churu district, Rajasthan. Its code is SRDR. It serves Sardar Shahar town. The station consists of a single platform. DEMU trains start from here for Ratangarh.
