= Lakhau, Rajasthan =

Lakhau
- village
- Location in Rajasthan, India Lakhau (India)
- Coordinates: 28.35872°N 75.085995°E
- Country: India
- State: Rajasthan

Languages
  - Official: Hindi
- Time zone: UTC+5:30 (IST)
- Postal code: 331002
- ISO 3166 code: RJ-IN
- Vehicle registration: RJ-

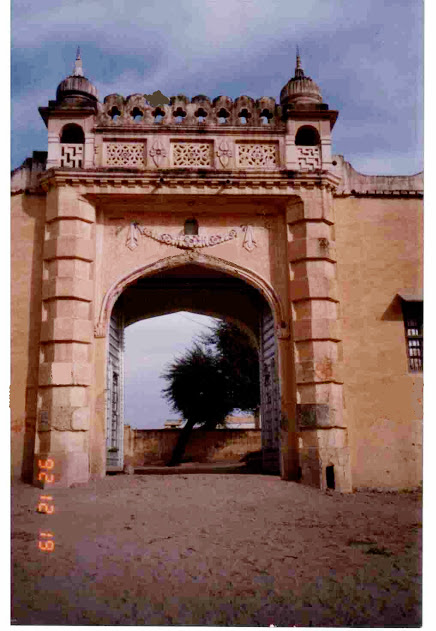
Lakhau Village Fort

Lakhau is a village in Churu district of Rajasthan and is the birthplace of Mohar Singh Rathore. The village was founded around 1850 AD by Thakur Khaman Singh, the great-grandfather of Mohar Singh Rathore and Karni Singh Rathore, who on having a dispute with his brothers at Village Ghanghu nearby separated and came to settle here, where there was a Mutt of an ancient saint.

It is the Gram Panchayat Headquarter, Having a Secondary School, as well as a Primary School. The main occupation of the villagers is Agriculture and cattle raising. There are many people of this village who have served in the Army, from the Ranks of Sepoy up to the highest rank of Colonel. The Village is situated right on the National Highway 65, at a distance of about 18 km from Churu, the district headquarter.

Lakhau also a village in Sibsagar district of Assam.
