= Poosaram Godara =

Member of Rajasthan Legislative Assembly
- Incumbent
- Assumed office 3 December 2023
- Preceded by: Abhinesh Maharshi
- Constituency: Ratangarh

Personal details
- Party: Indian National Congress
- Education: Bachelor of Commerce; Bachelor of Laws
- Alma mater: University of Rajasthan

Poosaram Godara is an Indian politician who represents the Ratangarh Assembly constituency in the 16th Rajasthan Legislative Assembly. He is a member of the Indian National Congress (INC).
