= Ghanghu =

Coordinates: 28°20′N 75°07′E

- village
- Interactive map of Ghanghu
- Country: India
- State: Rajasthan
- District: Churu

Languages
  - Official: Hindi
- Time zone: UTC+5:30 (IST)
- PIN: 331002
- Telephone code: +911562
- ISO 3166 code: RJ-IN
- Vehicle registration: RJ 10
- Nearest city: Churu
- Sex ratio: 50/50 ♂/♀
- Literacy: 81%%
- Lok Sabha constituency: Churu
- Vidhan Sabha constituency: Churu
- Climate: hot and cold (Köppen)

Ghanghu is a village in Churu district in Rajasthan state of India. This village is associated with Harsh and Jeenmata. One of the oldest villages in Rajasthan, it was a Thikana of Bikaner State in Pre-independence India. It was originally ruled by Chauhans, and later taken over by the Kandhalot Rathores.
