= Mohar Singh Rathore =

Indian politician (1926–1985)

Member of Lok Sabha
- In office 1984–1985
- Preceded by: Daulat Ram Saran
- Succeeded by: Narendra Budania
- Constituency: Churu Lok Sabha constituency

Member of Rajasthan Legislative Assembly
- In office 1962–1967
- Succeeded by: Megh Raj Mali
- Constituency: Churu Assembly constituency
- In office 1972–1977
- Preceded by: Megh Raj Mali
- Succeeded by: Megh Raj Mali

Personal details
- Born: 5 January 1926 Lakhau, Churu district, Rajasthan, India
- Died: 22 June 1985 (aged 59) New Delhi
- Party: Indian National Congress
- Education: L.L.B
- Occupation: Social activist and political activist

Mohar Singh Rathore (5 January 1926 – 22 June 1985) was a social reformer and politician from Indian National Congress. He was elected as a member of Lok Sabha from Churu constituency in 1984. He was also elected as member of Rajasthan Legislative Assembly for two terms from Churu assembly in 1962 and 1972. In year 1985 he died as sitting Member of Parliament.

== Early life ==
He was born in the village of Lakhau, 15 km east of Churu into a Rajput family to Moti Singh and Bhur Kanwar.

== Positions held ==
- 1956 – Enrolled Advocate, Rajasthan High Court
- 1962 – Elected MLA Rajasthan from Churu
- 1965 – Elected Member, Rajasthan PCC
- 1970 – Elected Member, AICC
- 1971 – Elected MLA Rajasthan from Churu
- 1972 – Elected Vice-president, DCC Churu
- Elected Director, Churu Central Co-operative Bank
- Elected chairman, Churu Central Co-operative Bank
- Elected Director, Rajasthan Apex Bank, Jaipur
- Elected chairman, Wholesale Upbhokta Bhandar, Churu
- Elected Director, URMUL, Bikaner
- Elected President, Sarvhitkarini Sabha, Churu
- Founded Balika MahaVidyalaya, Churu as founder chairman (a girls PG college)
- 1984 – Elected to Lok Sabha from Churu for the Congress Party
