= Ratangarh Assembly constituency =

Constituency of the Rajasthan legislative assembly in India

Coordinates: 28.076°N 74.617°E

Ratangarh
- Constituency No. 23 for the Rajasthan Legislative Assembly

Constituency details
- Country: India
- Region: North India
- State: Rajasthan
- District: Churu
- Lok Sabha constituency: Churu
- Established: 1951
- Reservation: None

Member of Legislative Assembly
- 16th Rajasthan Legislative Assembly
- Incumbent Poosaram Godara
- Party: Indian National Congress
- Elected year: 2023

Ratangarh Assembly constituency is one of constituencies of Rajasthan Legislative Assembly in the Churu Lok Sabha constituency.

== Members of the Legislative Assembly ==
Year	Name	Party
1951	Mahadev Prasad N Pandit	Independent
1957	Kishna	Independent
1962	Mohan Lal	Independent
1977	Jagdish Chandra	Janata Party
1980	Jaidev Prasad Indoria	Indian National Congress
1985	Hari Shankar Bhabhra	Bharatiya Janata Party
1990	Hari Shankar Bhabhra	Bharatiya Janata Party
1993	Hari Shankar Bhabhra	Bharatiya Janata Party
1998	Jaidev Prasad Indoria	Indian National Congress
2003	Raj Kumar Rinwa	Independent
2008	Raj Kumar Rinwa	Bharatiya Janata Party
2013	Raj Kumar Rinwa	Bharatiya Janata Party
2018	Abhinesh Maharshi	Bharatiya Janata Party
2023	Poosaram Godara	Indian National Congress

== Election results ==
=== 2023 ===
2023 Rajasthan Legislative Assembly election: Ratangarh
Party	Candidate	Votes	%	±%
INC	Poosaram Godara	109,383	53.69	+41.35
BJP	Abhinesh Maharshi	79,720	39.13	+0.57
Independent	Radheshyam Prajapat	5,956	2.92	
NOTA	None of the above	1,943	0.95	+0.66
Majority		29,663	14.56	+8.13
Turnout		203,735	73.15	−1.38
INC gain from BJP		Swing		

=== 2018 ===
2018 Rajasthan Legislative Assembly election: Ratangarh
Party	Candidate	Votes	%	±%
BJP	Abhinesh Maharshi	71,201	38.56	
Independent	Poosaram Godara	59,320	32.13	
INC	Bhanwarlal Pujari	22,791	12.34	
Independent	Raj Kumar Rinwa	18,789	10.18	
JD(U)	Daulat Ram Pensia	3,387	1.83	
Independent	Rohtash Kumar	2,231	1.21	
NOTA	None of the above	533	0.29	
Majority		11,881	6.43	
Turnout		184,638	74.53	
BJP gain from		Swing		

== See also ==
- Member of the Legislative Assembly (India)
