= Nohar Assembly constituency =

Constituency of the Rajasthan legislative assembly in India

Coordinates: 29.18°N 74.77°E

Nohar
- Constituency No. 10 for the Rajasthan Legislative Assembly

Constituency details
- Country: India
- Region: North India
- State: Rajasthan
- District: Hanumangarh district
- Established: 1951
- Reservation: None

Member of Legislative Assembly
- 16th Rajasthan Legislative Assembly
- Incumbent Amit Chachan
- Party: Indian National Congress

Nohar Assembly constituency is one of the constituencies of Rajasthan Legislative Assembly and it comes under Churu Lok Sabha constituency.

== Members of the Legislative Assembly ==
Election	Member	Party
1951	Manphool Singh	Indian National Congress
1957	Ram Kishan	Independent politician
1962	Hardatt Singh Beniwal	Independent politician
1967	R Chandra	Swatantra Party
1972	Bhim Raj	Indian National Congress
1977	Bahadur Singh	Janata Party
1980	Lakshmi Narayan	Indian National Congress
1985	Lakshmi Narayan	Indian National Congress
1990	Suchitra Arya	Janata Dal
1993	Ajay Singh Chautala	Janata Dal
1998	Suchitra Arya	Indian National Congress
2003	Bahadur Singh	Indian National Lok Dal
2008	Abhishek Matoria	Bharatiya Janata Party
2013	Abhishek Matoria	Bharatiya Janata Party
2018	Amit Chachan	Indian National Congress
2023	Amit Chachan	Indian National Congress

== Election results ==
=== 2023 ===
2023 Rajasthan Legislative Assembly election: Nohar
Party	Candidate	Votes	%	±%
INC	Amit Chachan	103,623	43.22	−2.83
BJP	Abhishek Matoria	102,728	42.85	+3.54
CPI(M)	Mangej Choudhary	26,824	11.19	+6.35
NOTA	None of the above	1,690	0.7	−0.31
Majority		895	0.37	−6.37
Turnout		239,758	85.25	+3.8
INC hold		Swing		

=== 2018 ===
2018 Rajasthan Legislative Assembly election: Nohar
Party	Candidate	Votes	%	±%
INC	Amit Chachan	93,851	46.05	
BJP	Abhishek Matoria	80,124	39.31	
Independent	Ram Kishan Bhakar	13,312	6.53	
CPI(M)	Mangej Choudhary	9,870	4.84	
BSP	Radhesyam Megwal	2,065	1.01	
NOTA	None of the above	2,065	1.01	
Majority		13,727	6.74	
Turnout		203,819	81.45	
INC gain from BJP		Swing		

== See also ==
- Member of the Legislative Assembly (India)
