= Pandit Deendayal Upadhyaya Medical College, Churu =

Tertiary Medical college in Churu, Rajasthan, India

Coordinates: 28.2848°N 74.9547°E

- Type: Medical college and hospital
- Established: 2018
- Affiliations: Rajasthan University of Health Sciences
- Principal: Mahesh Pukar
- Location: Churu, Rajasthan, India
- Website: https://education.rajasthan.gov.in/content/raj/education/churu-medical-college--churu/en/home.html#

Pandit Deendayal Upadhyaya Medical College, Churu is a full-fledged tertiary Medical college in Churu, Rajasthan. It was established in the year 2018. The college imparts the degree Bachelor of Medicine and Surgery (MBBS). Nursing and para-medical courses are also offered. The college is affiliated to Rajasthan University of Health Sciences and is recognised by National Medical Commission. The selection to the college is done on the basis of merit through National Eligibility and Entrance Test. D.B. general hospital, Churu and J.M.B. eye hospital, Churu are the associated hospitals with this college. The college has started its MBBS course from August 2018.
