= Sujangarh Assembly constituency =

Constituency of the Rajasthan legislative assembly in India

Coordinates: 27.70°N 74.47°E

Sujangarh
- Constituency No. 24 for the Rajasthan Legislative Assembly

Constituency details
- Country: India
- Region: North India
- State: Rajasthan
- District: Churu district
- Lok Sabha constituency: Churu
- Established: 1951
- Reservation: SC

Member of Legislative Assembly
- 16th Rajasthan Legislative Assembly
- Incumbent Manoj Meghwal
- Party: Indian National Congress
- Elected year: 2021

Sujangarh Assembly constituency is one of constituencies of Rajasthan Legislative Assembly in the Churu Lok Sabha constituency. It has been reserved for Scheduled Castes.

Sujangarh constituency covers all voters from parts of Sujangarh tehsil, which include ILRC Sujangarh including Sujangarh Municipal Board, ILRC Jeeli, ILRC Salasar, ILRC Bidasar including Bidasar Municipal Board, ILRC Lalgrah and ILRC Tendesar.

== Members of the Legislative Assembly ==
Year	Name	Party
1951	Pratap Singh	Independent
1957	Shanno Devi	Independent
1962	Phool Chand	Indian National Congress
1967	L Chand	Bharatiya Jana Sangh
1972	Phool Chand	Indian National Congress
1977	Rawat Ram	Janata Party
1980	Bhanwarlal Meghwal	Independent
1985	Chuni Lal Meghwal	Bharatiya Janata Party
1990	Bhanwarlal Meghwal	Indian National Congress
1993	Rameshwar Lal Bhati	Bharatiya Janata Party
1998	Bhanwarlal Meghwal	Indian National Congress
2003	Khema Ram Meghwal	Bharatiya Janata Party
2008	Bhanwarlal Meghwal	Indian National Congress
2013	Khema Ram Meghwal	Bharatiya Janata Party
2018	Bhanwarlal Meghwal	Indian National Congress
2021^	Manoj Meghwal	Indian National Congress
2023	Manoj Meghwal	Indian National Congress

^By-Poll

== Election results ==
=== 2023 ===
2023 Rajasthan Legislative Assembly election: Sujangarh
Party	Candidate	Votes	%	±%
INC	Manoj Meghwal	86,790	43.18	−2.44
BJP	Santosh Meghwal	84,337	41.96	+17.48
RLP	Babulal Kuldeep	19,438	9.67	
Independent	Rajendra Kumar Nayak	4,303	2.14	
NOTA	None of the above	1,788	0.89	−0.86
Majority		2,453	1.22	−19.92
Turnout		200,989	69.42	−1.23
INC hold		Swing		

=== 2021 ===
Bye-election, 2021: Sujangarh
Party	Candidate	Votes	%	±%
INC	Manoj Meghwal	79,253	49.30	
BJP	Khema Ram Meghwal	43,642	27.15	
RLP	Sitaram Nayak	32,210	20.04	
ARP	Doulatram	1,627	1.01	
Majority		35,611	22.15	
Turnout		1,60,845	58.29	
INC hold		Swing		

=== 2018 ===
2018 Rajasthan Legislative Assembly election: Sujangarh
Party	Candidate	Votes	%	±%
INC	Bhanwarlal Meghwal	83,632	45.62	
BJP	Khema Ram Meghwal	44,883	24.48	
Independent	Santosh Meghwal	38,603	21.06	
BSP	Sitaram	4,802	2.62	
Independent	Rameshwarlal	4,353	2.37	
Independent	Heeralal	2,359	1.29	
NOTA	None of the above	3,201	1.75	
Majority		38,749	21.14	
Turnout		183,318	70.65	
INC gain from BJP		Swing		

=== 2013 ===
2013 Rajasthan Legislative Assembly election: Sujangarh
Party	Candidate	Votes	%	±%
BJP	Khema Ram Meghwal	78,920	50.54	
INC	Bhanwarlal Meghwal	65,271	41.80	
BSP	Sitaram	7,415	4.75	
NOTA	None of the above	4,554	2.92	
Majority		13,649	9.00	
Turnout		1,56,456	72.42	
BJP gain from INC		Swing		

== See also ==
- Member of the Legislative Assembly (India)
