= Amit Chachan =

Indian politician

Member of the Rajasthan Legislative Assembly
- Incumbent
- Assumed office 2018
- Preceded by: Abhishek Matoria
- Constituency: Nohar

Personal details
- Party: Indian National Congress

Amit Chachan is an Indian politician. He is member of the 16th Rajasthan Legislative Assembly, representing the Nohar constituency. He is member of the Indian National Congress.

== Political career ==
=== 15th Rajasthan Legislative Assembly (2018–2023) ===
Chachan began his political journey by winning the Nohar constituency seat in the 15th Rajasthan Assembly. In the 2018 Rajasthan Legislative Assembly election, he got 93,851 votes out of a total of 202,003 votes polled.

=== 16th Rajasthan Legislative Assembly (2023–present) ===
Following the 2023 Rajasthan Legislative Assembly election, he was re-elected as an MLA from the Nohar Assembly constituency. In a closely contested race, he defeated the BJP candidate Abhishek Kumar Matoria by a narrow margin of 895 votes.
