= Abhinesh Maharshi =

Indian politician

Rajasthan Legislative Assembly
- Incumbent
- Assumed office 11 December 2018
- Constituency: Ratangarh

Personal details
- Born: 20 August 1962 (age 63) Ratangarh, Rajasthan, India
- Party: Bharatiya Janata Party

Abhinesh Maharshi is an Indian politician from the Ratangarh Assembly constituency in Rajasthan. He is a member of the 15th Assembly of Rajasthan as a Bharatiya Janata Party member.

== Political career ==
In 2008, he contested from Ratangarh assembly on a Congress ticket. He lost the election, securing 37,000 votes. In the 2014 Lok Sabha elections, Maharshi contested from Churu Loksbha seat on BSP ticket. He stood second and got three lakh votes. In the 2018 assembly elections, he defeated the independent Poosaram Godara by 11881 votes and became MLA for the first time.
