= Narendra Budania =

Indian politician

Member of Rajasthan Legislative Assembly
- In office 2018–Incumbent
- Constituency: Taranagar

Member of Parliament, Lok Sabha
- In office 1996–1999
- Succeeded by: Ram Singh Kaswan
- Constituency: Churu
- In office 1984–1989
- Succeeded by: Daulat Ram Saran
- Constituency: Churu

Member of Rajasthan Legislative Assembly
- In office 1993–1996
- Succeeded by: Bhanwar Lal Sharma
- Constituency: Sardarshahar

Member of Parliament, Rajya Sabha
- In office 4 April 2012 – 3 April 2018
- Succeeded by: Kirori Lal Meena
- Constituency: Rajasthan

Personal details
- Born: 5 July 1956 (age 70) Dudhwa Khara, Churu District, Rajasthan
- Party: Indian National Congress
- Spouse: Kanak Budania (m. 1980)
- Children: 2 sons
- Education: BSc, LL.B.
- Alma mater: Lohia P.G. College, Churu & University of Rajasthan, Jaipur
- Profession: Agriculturist, Advocate and Social Worker

Narendra Budania (born 5 July 1956) is an Indian politician serving as member of Rajasthan Legislative Assembly representing Taranagar constituency since 2013. He was elected as member of Lok Sabha from Churu constituency in years 1985, 1996 and 1998. He also served as member of Rajya Sabha from Rajasthan for a period of 2012 to 2018. He is a member of Indian National Congress.

== Early life and education ==
Narendra Budania was born on 5 July 1956 in Dudhwa Khara village of Churu district in Rajasthan. He completed his Bachelor of Science (B.Sc.) and Bachelor of Laws (LL.B.) degrees and later worked as an agriculturist, advocate and social worker. Budania belongs to Churu district and has remained associated with public life and social activities in Rajasthan.

== Political career ==
Narendra Budania is a senior politician from Rajasthan and a member of the Indian National Congress . He has represented Rajasthan in Lok Sabha, Rajya Sabha and Rajasthan Legislative Assembly at different periods of his political career.

Budania was elected to the Lok Sabha from Churu Lok Sabha constituency in 1985, 1996 and 1998. Later, he served as a Member of the Rajya Sabha representing Rajasthan from 2012 to 2018.

In the 2018 Rajasthan Legislative Assembly elections, Budania was elected as MLA from Taranagar Assembly constituency after defeating senior BJP leader Rajendra Rathore. He retained the Taranagar Assembly seat in the 2023 Rajasthan Legislative Assembly elections as candidate of the Indian National Congress.

Budania has remained associated with issues related to farmers, rural development and public welfare in Rajasthan politics.

== Electoral history ==
=== Membership of the Lok Sabha ===
SI No.	Lok Sabha	Tenure	Constituency	Party
1.	Eighth	1985–89	Churu	Indian National Congress
2.	Eleventh	1996–98	Churu	Indian National Congress
3.	Twelfth	1998–99	Churu	Indian National Congress

=== Membership of the Rajya Sabha ===
SI No.	Tenure	State	Party
1.	2009–10	Rajasthan	Indian National Congress
2.	2010–12	Rajasthan	Indian National Congress
3.	2012–18	Rajasthan	Indian National Congress

=== Membership of the Rajasthan Legislative Assembly ===
SI No.	Assembly	Tenure	Constituency	Party
1.	10th Rajasthan Legislative Assembly	1993–96	Sardarshahar	Indian National Congress
2.	15th Rajasthan Legislative Assembly	2018-2023	Taranagar	Indian National Congress
3.	16th Rajasthan Legislative Assembly	2023-2028	Taranagar	Indian National Congress
