= Hsromega =

Gene found in Drosophila

HSR omega conserved region 1
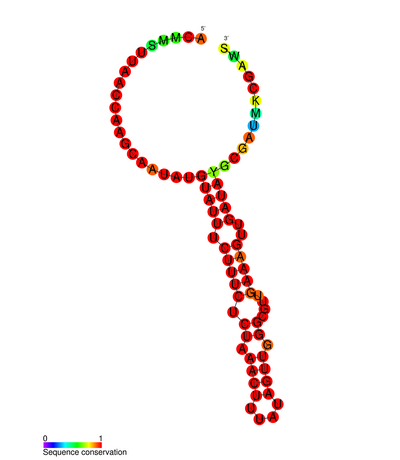
- Conserved secondary structure of HSR-omega 1

Identifiers
- Symbol: HSR omega 1
- Rfam: RF01885

Other data
- RNA type: Gene
- PDB structures: PDBe

The developmentally active and heat shock inducible hsromega or hsrω gene in Drosophila produces multiple long non-coding RNA transcripts. This gene is transcriptionally active in almost all cell types of Drosophila and is the most actively induced following heat shock. A unique feature of the hsromega gene, which led to discovery of the 93D puff in 1970, is its singular inducibility with benzamide and a variety of other amides.

The multiple transcripts of this gene include a nuclear >10kb long nuclear transcript, hsromega-n, and a 1.9kb nuclear transcript which after splicing produces a 1.2kb cytoplasmic transcript. The >10kb nuclear hsromega-n transcript organizes the nucleoplasmic omega speckles with which heterogeneous nuclear RNA-binding proteins (hnRNPs) and certain other proteins co-localize. The omega speckles are suggested to act as storage sites for hnRNPs etc. which are not actively engaged at a given time.

The genomic architecture of this gene and hnRNP-binding properties of its large nuclear transcript are conserved in different species although the primary base sequence has diverged rapidly. Heat shock causes the omega speckles to disappear and all the omega speckle associated proteins and the hsrω-n transcript to accumulate at the 93D locus. The hsrω-n transcript directly or indirectly affects the localization/stability/activity of a variety of proteins including hnRNPs, Sxl, Hsp83, cAMP response element binding binding protein (CBP), Drosophila inhibitor of apoptosis protein 1 (DIAP1), JNK-signalling members, proteasome constituents, lamin C, ISWI, HP1 and poly(ADP)-ribose polymerase. In view of the interactions of this large nuclear non-coding RNA with diverse regulatory proteins, it appears to act as a hub that integrates multiple regulatory networks in the cell.
