= Sanjeev Beniwal =

Indian politician (born 1966)

Member of the Rajasthan Legislative Assembly
- In office 28 November 1998 – 4 December 2003
- Constituency: Bhadra, Rajasthan
- In office 8 December 2013 – 11 December 2018
- Constituency: Bhadra, Rajasthan
- Incumbent
- Assumed office 3 December 2023
- Preceded by: Balwan Poonia
- Constituency: Bhadra, Rajasthan

Personal details
- Born: 14 November 1966 (age 59)
- Party: Bharatiya Janata Party
- Other political affiliations: Indian National Congress (before 2013)

Sanjeev Beniwal (born 14 November 1966) is an Indian politician. He was elected to the Rajasthan Legislative Assembly from Bhadra, Rajasthan, as a member of the Bharatiya Janata Party. He has served three terms in Assembly, first elected in 1998, then in 2003, and again in 2023.

== Political career ==
He began his political career by contesting the 1998 Rajasthan Legislative Assembly election from the Bhadra constituency as an INC candidate and was elected as an MLA. This marked the first time in 30 years that a Congress candidate had won in Bhadra.

In the 2013 Rajasthan Legislative Assembly election, he again contested from Bhadra, this time as a Bharatiya Janata Party candidate, and was elected as an MLA.

In the 2023 Rajasthan Legislative Assembly election, he was re-elected as an MLA from the Bhadra, defeating CPI candidate Balwan Poonia by a margin of 1,132 votes.
