= Manoj Nyangli =

Indian politician

Member of the Rajasthan Legislative Assembly
- Incumbent
- Assumed office 3 December 2023
- Preceded by: Krishna Poonia
- Constituency: Sadulpur
- In office 2013–2018
- Preceded by: Kamla Kaswan
- Succeeded by: Krishna Poonia
- Constituency: Sadulpur

Personal details
- Party: Shiv Sena (2022–present)
- Other political affiliations: Bahujan Samaj Party

Manoj Nyangli is an Indian politician serving as a member of the Rajasthan Legislative Assembly who represents the Sadulpur Assembly constituency of Churu district.
