= Bhojasar, Phalodi =

Bhojasar
- Village
- Location in Rajasthan, India Bhojasar (India)
- Coordinates: 27.228°N 72.804°E
- Country: India
- State: Rajasthan
- District: Phalodi

Government
  - Body: Panchayat
- Elevation: 232 m (761 ft)

Population (2011)
  - Total: 1,612

Languages
  - Official: Hindi
- Time zone: UTC+5:30 (IST)
- PIN: 342311
- Telephone code: 91-2925
- ISO 3166 code: RJ-IN
- Vehicle registration: RJ-43
- Nearest city: Phalodi
- Distance from Phalodi: 45 kilometres (28 mi) (land)
- Distance from Jodhpur: 126 kilometres (78 mi) (land)
- Avg. summer temperature: 46-48 °C
- Avg. winter temperature: 0-4 °C

Bhojasar is a village within the Phalodi administrative region of Phalodi district, Rajasthan, India. The village lies 45 kilometres (28 mi) east of Phalodi. It is situated in the Jodhpur division and 126 kilometres (78 mi) north from Jodhpur. Phalodi District was established on 7 August 2023. Before that village used to be a part of Jodhpur district with Phalodi Tehsil.

The 490 hectares (4.9 km^{2}) village has an overall population of about 1612 It was 1362 in 2001 census. Most of the villagers are dependent on farming and labour works.
