= Bhojasar, Barmer =

Bhojasar
- Village
- Location in Rajasthan, India Bhojasar (India)
- Coordinates: 25.825°N 71.800°E
- Country: India
- State: Rajasthan
- District: Barmer

Government
  - Body: Panchayat
- Elevation: 224 m (735 ft)

Population (2011)
  - Total: 1,343

Languages
  - Official: Hindi
- Time zone: UTC+5:30 (IST)
- PIN: 344034
- Telephone code: 91-2986
- ISO 3166 code: RJ-IN
- Vehicle registration: RJ-04
- Nearest city: Barmer
- Distance from Baytu: 13 kilometres (8.1 mi) (land)
- Distance from Barmer: 44 kilometres (27 mi) (land)
- Avg. summer temperature: 44–46 °C
- Avg. winter temperature: −2 °C

Bhojasar is a village within the Baytu administrative region of Barmer district, Rajasthan, India. The village lies 13 kilometres (8.1 mi) south of Baytu and 44 kilometres (27 mi) east from district headquarter Barmer.

The 1,213 hectares (12.13 km^{2}) village has an overall population of about 1343. This village is in Thar Desert reason and there is another village in Jaisalmer district with same name which is about 200 kilometres (120 mi) far.
