= Ramgarh, Hanumangarh =

Ramgarh Chindalia Shri Ramgarh
- Town
- Location in Rajasthan, India Ramgarh (India)
- Coordinates: 29.186°N 74.974°E
- Country: India
- State: Rajasthan
- District: Hanumangarh

Government
  - Body: Ramgarh Seva Samiti

Population (45)
  - Total: 15,007

Languages
  - Official: Hindi
- Time zone: UTC+5:30 (IST)
- PIN: 335504
- Telephone code: 01555
- ISO 3166 code: RJ-IN
- Vehicle registration: RJ-49
- Nearest city: Nohar
- Sex ratio: 55-45 ♂/♀
- Lok Sabha constituency: Churu
- Civic agency: Ramgarh Seva Samiti
- Avg. summer temperature: 40 °C (104 °F)
- Avg. winter temperature: 12 °C (54 °F)

Ramgarh is a town in Nohar tehsil in Hanumangarh district of Rajasthan state. Old name of Ramgarh is Shri Ramgarh. It is subtehsil
