= Manoj Meghwal =

Indian politician

Manoj Kumar Meghwal

Member of the Rajasthan Legislative Assembly
- Incumbent
- Assumed office 12 July 2021
- Preceded by: Bhanwarlal Meghwal
- Constituency: Sujangarh

Personal details
- Born: 30 April 1975 (age 50) Baghsara East, Sujangarh, Churu, Rajasthan, India
- Party: Indian National Congress
- Spouse: Renu Mayal
- Parent(s): Bhanwarlal Meghwal (father); Kesar Devi Meghwal (mother)
- Education: B.Sc & L.L.B
- Alma mater: University of Rajasthan
- Occupation: Politician
- Profession: Business
- Website: official website

Manoj Kumar Meghwal (born 30 April 1975) is an Indian politician and currently serving Member of the Rajasthan Legislative Assembly 15th & 16th from Sujangarh. He is Member of the Indian National Congress in a by-election held on 17 April 2021 following the death of his father, Bhanwarlal Meghwal, who was the former sitting member of the constituency.
