= Ram Singh Kaswan =

Indian politician

Member of Parliament, Lok Sabha
- In office 1999–2014
- Succeeded by: Rahul Kaswan
- Constituency: Churu
- In office 1991–1996
- Succeeded by: Narendra Budania
- Constituency: Churu

Member of Rajasthan Legislative Assembly
- In office 1998–1999
- Succeeded by: Nand Lal Poonia
- Constituency: Sadulpur

Personal details
- Born: 10 August 1945 (age 81) Kalri, Churu District, Rajasthan
- Party: Bharatiya Janata Party
- Children: 4
- Parent: Deep Chand Kaswan
- Education: B.Sc., LL.B.
- Alma mater: Doonger College, Bikaner and Rajasthan University, Jaipur
- Profession: Agriculturist, Advocate and Social Worker
- Source

Ram Singh Kaswan (Hindi pronunciation: [ɾaːm sɪŋgʱ kəs.ʋaːn̪]; born 10 August 1945) is an Indian politician and a leader of Bharatiya Janata Party. He was member of parliament from Churu district in Rajasthan, India.

== Personal life ==
He was born to Deep Chand Kaswan in Sadulpur, Churu. He is graduated with Bachelor of Laws.
