= Churu Assembly constituency =

Constituency of the Rajasthan legislative assembly in India

Coordinates: 28.30°N 74.96°E

Churu
- Constituency No. 22 for the Rajasthan Legislative Assembly

Constituency details
- Country: India
- Region: North India
- State: Rajasthan
- District: Churu district
- Lok Sabha constituency: Churu
- Established: 1951
- Reservation: None

Member of Legislative Assembly
- 16th Rajasthan Legislative Assembly
- Incumbent Harlal Saharan
- Party: Bharatiya Janata Party

Churu Assembly constituency is one of constituencies of Rajasthan Legislative Assembly in the Churu Lok Sabha constituency.

Churu Constituency covers all voters from Churu tehsil.

== Members of the Legislative Assembly ==
Year	Name	Party
1951	Kumbha Ram Arya	Indian National Congress
1957	Mohar Singh	Independent
1962	Mohar Singh	Independent
1967	Megh Raj Mali	Independent
1972	Mohar Singh	Indian National Congress
1977	Megh Raj Mali	Janata Party
1980	Bhalu Khan	Indian National Congress (I)
1985	Hamida Begum	Indian National Congress
1990	Rajendra Singh Rathore	Janata Dal
1993	Rajendra Singh Rathore	Bharatiya Janata Party
1998	Rajendra Singh Rathore	Bharatiya Janata Party
2003	Rajendra Singh Rathore	Bharatiya Janata Party
2008	Hazi Maqbool	Indian National Congress
2013	Rajendra Singh Rathore	Bharatiya Janata Party
2018	Rajendra Singh Rathore	Bharatiya Janata Party
2023	Harlal Saharan	Bharatiya Janata Party

== Election results ==
=== 2023 ===
2023 Rajasthan Legislative Assembly election: Churu
Party	Candidate	Votes	%	±%
BJP	Harlal Saharan	99,432	50.05	+1.77
INC	Rafique Mandelia	92,558	46.59	−0.66
NOTA	None of the above	1,151	0.58	−0.43
Majority		6,874	3.46	+2.43
Turnout		198,681	77.41	−0.47
BJP hold		Swing		

=== 2018 ===
2018 Rajasthan Legislative Assembly election: Churu
Party	Candidate	Votes	%	±%
BJP	Rajendra Singh Rathore	87,233	48.28	
INC	Rafique Mandelia	85,383	47.25	
NOTA	None of the above	1,816	1.01	
Majority		1,850	1.03	
Turnout		180,687	77.88	
BJP hold		Swing		

=== 2013 ===
2013 Rajasthan Legislative Assembly election: Churu
Party	Candidate	Votes	%	±%
BJP	Rajendra Singh Rathore	84,100	55.21	+13.80
INC	Haji Maqbool Mandelia	60,098	39.46	−8.90
CPI(M)	Ramkaran Choudhary	1,620	1.06	New entry
BSP	Dhanpat	1,617	1.06	−2.80
National People's Party	Saleem Gujar	1,442	0.95	New entry
NOTA	None of the above	1,320	0.87	New entry
Majority		24,002	15.75	+8.80
Turnout		152,316	78.75	+12.46
BJP gain from INC		Swing		

=== 2008 ===
2008 Rajasthan Legislative Assembly election: Churu
Party	Candidate	Votes	%	±%
INC	Hazi Maqbool	56,458	48.36	+6.62
BJP	Harlal Saharan	48,347	41.41	−7.14
BSP	Himmat Singh	4,508	3.86	−1.96
Independent	Hamida Begum	4,152	3.56	
Majority		8,111	6.95	+0.14
Turnout		116,751	66.29	−5.62
INC gain from BJP		Swing		

=== 2003 ===
2003 Rajasthan Legislative Assembly election: Churu
Party	Candidate	Votes	%	±%
BJP	Rajendra Rathore	56,484	48.55	
INC	Hussain Sayed	48,559	41.74	
BSP	Rama Kant	6,772	5.82	
RSNM	Karni Singh Shekhawat	1,628	1.40	
Independent	Amar Singh	1,009	0.87	
Independent	Shabir Khan	809	0.70	
Independent	Ramjas Meghwal	599	0.51	
LJNSP	Mohan Lal	489	0.42	
Majority		7,925	6.81	
Turnout		116,642	71.91	
BJP hold		Swing		

== See also ==
- Member of the Legislative Assembly (India)
