= Dudhwa Khara =

Dudhwa Khara Rathore(Jagirdars)
- Village
- Country: India
- State: Rajasthan
- District: Churu

Languages
  - Official: Hindi
- Time zone: UTC+5:30 (IST)
- Nearest city: Churu

Dudhwa Khara is a village in Churu district in Rajasthan, in northwest India, situated in the Thar Desert and 24 km north from Churu. The historic rural village has large designed havelis, an interesting topography, and camel safaris.
