= Abhishek Matoria =

Indian politician

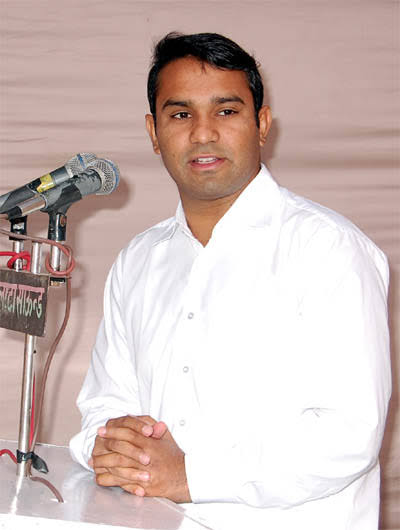
Abhishek Matoria

Abhishek Matoria (born 27 December 1982) is an Indian politician. He was a member of Rajasthan Legislative Assembly representing Nohar assembly constituency in Rajasthan. He is a member of Bharatiya Janata Party. At the age of 26, he is the youngest MLA in Rajasthan so far. He has been elected from Nohar constituency in 2008 and again in 2013. He was also youngest chairman, Local bodies election in 2005 in Rajasthan. He belongs to village Matorian Wali Dhani in Tehsil Nohar. He is brother-in-law of Abhay Singh Chautala. He belongs to village Pohraka (near to Village Rampura Matoria), now Rawatsar.

Abhishek Matoria has been elected President of the Indian Amateur Boxing Federation (an autonomous National Epex Sports Body of Boxing) on 23 September 2012. Matoria is an eminent athlete and participated up to North Zone Athletics Championships.
