= Harlal Saharan =

Indian politician

Member of the 16th Rajasthan Legislative Assembly
- Incumbent
- Assumed office 3 December 2023
- Preceded by: Rajendra Singh Rathore
- Constituency: Churu

Personal details
- Born: 6 May 1969 (age 57)
- Party: Bhartiya Janta Party
- Occupation: Politician

Harlal Saharan is an Indian politician currently serving as a member of the 16th Rajasthan Legislative Assembly, representing the Churu Assembly constituency as a member of the Bhartiya Janta Party.

Following the 2023 Rajasthan Legislative Assembly election, he was elected as an MLA from the Churu Assembly constituency, defeating Rafique Mandelia, the candidate from the Indian National Congress (INC), by a margin of 6740 votes.
