= Bhojasar, Jhunjhunu =

Bhojasar
- Village
- Location in Rajasthan, India Bhojasar (India)
- Coordinates: 28.023°N 75.241°E
- Country: India
- State: Rajasthan
- District: Jhunjhunu

Government
  - Body: Panchayat
- Elevation: 334 m (1,096 ft)

Population (2011)
  - Total: 2,457

Languages
  - Official: Hindi
- Time zone: UTC+5:30 (IST)
- PIN: 333041
- Telephone code: 91-1592
- ISO 3166 code: RJ-IN
- Vehicle registration: RJ-18
- Nearest city: Jhunjhunu
- Distance from Mandawa: 16 kilometres (9.9 mi) (land)
- Distance from Jhunjhunu: 25 kilometres (16 mi) (land)
- Avg. summer temperature: 40-42 °C
- Avg. winter temperature: 4-8 °C

Bhojasar is a village within the Jhunjhunu administrative region of Jhunjhunu district, Rajasthan, India. The village lies 25 kilometres (16 mi) west of Jhunjhunu and 16 kilometres (9.9 mi) east from Mandawa.

The 961 hectares (9.61 km^{2}) village has an overall population of about 2457. Nearby other villages are Sanjay Nagar (west), Shyampura (east) and Harnathpura (north).
