= Bhojasar, Jaisalmer =

Bhojasar
- Village
- Location in Rajasthan, India Bhojasar (India)
- Coordinates: 27.010°N 71.145°E
- Country: India
- State: Rajasthan
- District: Jaisalmer

Government
  - Body: Panchayat
- Elevation: 224 m (735 ft)

Population (2011)
  - Total: 214

Languages
  - Official: Hindi
- Time zone: UTC+5:30 (IST)
- PIN: 345001
- Telephone code: 91-3019
- ISO 3166 code: RJ-IN
- Vehicle registration: RJ-15
- Nearest city: Jaisalmer
- Distance from Jaisalmer: 31 kilometres (19 mi) (land)
- Distance from Jodhpur: 250 kilometres (160 mi) (land)
- Avg. summer temperature: 40-42 °C
- Avg. winter temperature: 6-10 °C

Bhojasar is a village within the Jaisalmer administrative region of Jaisalmer district, Rajasthan, India. The village lies 31 kilometres (19 mi) east of Jaisalmer. It is situated in the Jodhpur division and 250 kilometres (160 mi) west from Jodhpur.

The 3,430.90 hectares (34.3090 km^{2}) village has an overall population of about 214 It is in the Thar Desert and area-wise one of the biggest village. Another village with same name in Thar region (Barmer district) is about 200 kilometres (120 mi) far.
