= Anil Kumar Sharma (Rajasthan politician) =

Indian politician

Member of Rajasthan Legislative Assembly
- Incumbent
- Assumed office 2022
- Preceded by: Bhanwar Lal Sharma
- Constituency: Sardarshahar

Personal details
- Born: 5 November 1970 (age 55)
- Party: Indian National Congress
- Spouse: Renu Sharma (m. 1991)
- Children: 3

Anil Kumar Sharma is an Indian politician, and he is currently representing Sardarshahar Assembly constituency as a Member of Rajasthan Legislative Assembly. He is a member of Indian National Congress.
