= Chandan Mal Baid =

Indian politician

Chandan Mal Baid (1922-2010) was a leader of the Indian National Congress. A native of Rajasthan, he served as that state's finance minister. He was cremated on 21 February 2010, he was the MLA from Taranagar, Churu, Rajasthan later on his son Chandra Shekhar Baid also served as MLA of Taranagar, Churu, Rajasthan.
