= Bhojasar Chhota, Sikar =

Bhojasar Chhota
- Village
- Location in Rajasthan, India Bhojasar Chhota (India)
- Coordinates: 27.740°N 74.989°E
- Country: India
- State: Rajasthan
- District: Sikar

Government
  - Body: Panchayat
- Elevation: 360 m (1,180 ft)

Population (2011)
  - Total: 1,853

Languages
  - Official: Hindi
- Time zone: UTC+5:30 (IST)
- PIN: 332312
- Telephone code: 91-1573
- ISO 3166 code: RJ-IN
- Vehicle registration: RJ-23
- Nearest city: Sikar
- Distance from Laxmangarh: 10 kilometres (6.2 mi) (land)
- Distance from Sikar: 23 kilometres (14 mi) (land)
- Avg. summer temperature: 44-48 °C
- Avg. winter temperature: 0-4 °C

Bhojasar Chhota or Chhota Bhojasar is a village within the Laxmangarh administrative region of Sikar district, Rajasthan, India. The village lies 23 kilometres (14 mi) north-west of Sikar and 10 kilometres (6.2 mi) south from Laxmangarh.

The 1,017 hectares (10.17 km^{2}) village has an overall population of about 1853. Nearby other villages are Bhojasar Bara (north), Dalmas (west) and khatipura (east).
