= Sardarshahar =

Sardarshahar SRDR
- City

- Location in North Rajasthan, India Sardarshahar (India)
- Coordinates: 28.440053°N 74.490818°E
- Country: India
- State: Rajasthan
- District: Churu
- Founder: Ratan Singh (King Of Bikaner State)
- Named for: Sardar Singh (Son Of Ratan Singh)

Government
  - Type: City Council
  - City Council President: Rajkaran Choudhary

Area
  - City: 36.00 km^{2} (13.90 sq mi)
  - Rural: 3,796 km^{2} (1,466 sq mi)
  - Rank: Biggest Tehsil in Churu
- Elevation: 248.108 m (814.00 ft)

Population (2011)
  - City: 95,911
  - Density: 235/km^{2} (610/sq mi)

Languages
  - Official: Hindi, English
  - Native: Bagri
- Time zone: UTC+5:30 (IST)
- PIN: 331403
- Telephone code: 01564
- Vehicle registration: RJ10
- Sex ratio: 1020/1000 ♂/♀
- Website: https://sardarshaharblog.com/

Sardarshahar is a city located in the Churu district of Rajasthan, India. It is also the seat of the Rajasthan legislative assembly Sardarshahar Assembly constituency. Sardarshahar is the tehsil headquarter. and part of the Churu Lok Sabha constituency. Sardarshahar was established in 1838 at the place of "Alwana" village in Bikaner state. The city is named after Sardar Singh, The son of Bikaner Maharaja(Raja Ratan Singh). It is known for its grand Havelis (mansions) with frescoes, The only Clock Tower (GhantaGhar) in Asia which streets running under it in all four directions, Shri Ichha Puran Balaji Mandir, Acharya Shri Mahapragya Samadhi Sthal(ShantiPeeth), Gandhi Vidya Mandir and many more. It is famous for its Food (especially sweets), handicraft work, silver work, and woodwork. It is the birthplace of the Eleventh Acharya (Religious head)-Acharyashri Mahashramanji of the Shri Jain Terapanthi Sect.

== Location and transport ==
Sardarshahar, located in Rajasthan, India, is strategically positioned for easy access to various destinations in the region. The city located approximately 300 km from the national capital, New Delhi and 245 km away from the state capital, Jaipur, and a mere 130 km from the vibrant city of Bikaner. Sardarshahar is well-connected to Ratangarh Junction through a railway line, the railway line comes from Ratangarh Junction and ends at Sardarshahar Railway Station. For local transportation, auto-rickshaws are the primary mode of travel within the city. The city has its own RSRTC bus depot, operating since 1976, which provides bus services to numerous cities of Rajasthan.

Nearest Airport :

- Bikaner Airport - 150 km
- Nearest International Airport - Jaipur International Airport 267 km

Highway :

- Amritsar-Jamnagar Expressway (NH-754): The interchange of this Expressway is located 70 kilometers away from Sardarshahar on the Sardarshahar-Lunkansar SH-6A Highway.
- Mega Highway Hanumangarh - Kishangarh (SH-7) : Sardarshar is situated on Hanumangarh - Kishangarh Mega Highway, which was developed in 2008 by RIDCOR and the Rajasthan government. This highway is classified as a state highway.
- Dungargarh - Sadulpur (SH6) : Sardarshar is situated on the Dungargarh - Sadulpur State Highway 6, which is a state highway developed by the Rajasthan government and is also proposed as a national highway.
- Sardarshahar - Lunkaransar (SH-6A) : This highway is a branch of SH6 and is another state highway developed by the Rajasthan government.
- Sardarshahar - Ratangarh Via Churu (SH107) : This is the least developed highway in Sardarshahar, a single-lane state highway connecting Sardarshahar to the district headquarters Churu.

Sardarshahar Railway : The railway line from Sardarshar was initially established by the Bikaner State in 1916, running to Ratangarh. In 2013, the Indian government initiated the conversion of the Sardarshahar rail line to a broad gauge. The new line was constructed in 2017 between Ratangarh and Sardarshahar, with electrification completed in 2022. Sardarshahar is now connected to Ratangarh Junction, with three daily trains servicing the route. Proposed railway lines for Sardarshahar include Sardarshahar-Hanumgarh and Sardarshahr-Sadulpur-Vai-Taranagar, which are currently under consideration in the Railway Department.

== History ==
It is about 1832 when the economic situation of Bikaner state was weak. The city was founded in Bikaner in the name of princes. There was a need to settle the city to boost the falling economy. Took the task to Hukum Chand Surana to make this idea work. At that time the Diwan of the state was Baid Mehta by whom all the letter/ orders of Sardarshahar were written. Hukum Chand Surana and Madan Singh Chhajed were sent near Sawai village to find a suitable place. A village 85 miles away from Bikaner and 29 miles away from Ratangarh [which was established by his father Surat Singh in 1798 in the name of Maharaj Ratan Singh] was found whose name was Alwana अलवाना(refer page no 72 of Gazzettier of the Bikaner State written by captain P.W.Powlett, Political Agent of Alwar State) .In some places Alwana is also mentioned as Rajavas. Alwana was renamed Sardargarh in 1832 and started building houses for Raj employees. To expedite the process, Baid Mehta wrote a letter in which it was announced that Sardargarh would not be taken for five years to settle down and that the state of Bikaner would be given a prize money of Rs. Thus in Vikram Samvat 1888 (1832) Alwana village was renamed after the heir to the Gadi Maharaj Kanwar Sardar Singh as Sardar Garh by Maharaja Ratan Singh of Bikaner State and in Vikram Samvat 1895(AD 1838) the foundation of the fort was duly renamed as Sardarshahar in place of Sardar Garh town. Mohilo ruled Sardarshahar for a long for which definite information is known from the statue /छतरी of Mohilo. The statue/छतरी of Indrapal Mohilo of Sardarshahar is said to be from 1185 AD. It was also held in Sardarshahar Tehsil at the time of 1891 census in the country. At this time there were 93 villages in Sardarshahar tehsil of Bikaner state, and there were lot of Jat and Brahmin people in it.

Rai Bahadur Hukam Singh Sodhi, Diwan of Bikaner State has written in his book Physical and Political Geography of Bikaner State with Historical Notes, describing the 1891 census. The total population of Sardarshahar Tehsil is 44911, out of which 23,313 were males and 21,598 females. At that time there were also 2 police stations Sardarshahar. Sodhi had mentioned the important place of this tehsil to Sardarshahar where at that time there was a British post office and an Anglo-Vernacular school near 1890. There was also a small stronghold where 2 cannons were also kept. Not a single drop of rain fell in most of the land, the development of Sardarshahar was stopped for a few years.

A municipality was established at Sardarshahar in 1896.

According to the 1961 census, there were 177 villages in Sardarshahar tehsil. The entire population of tehsil was 98,694 and this population was more than Churu.

== Description ==
Sardarshahar is situated in the heart of the Thar Desert. This is a historical town and was established around 700 years ago. The town was named after prince Sardar Singh of Bikaner Kingdom. It has havelis adorned with fresco paintings and carved woodwork. It also has a small fort that now houses government offices.

It is the birthplace of the Eleventh Acharya of Jain Swetambar Terapanth, Acharya Shri Mahashramanji. It also has the Acharya Mahapragya Samadhi Sthal.

Sardarshahar has a tradition of Rajasthani music and is associated with the production of silver jewelry, utensils, and decorative items.

== Education ==
Sardarshahar has become an education hub in the district. The IASE Deemed University is a constituent of Gandhi Vidya Mandir. The foundation stone of the 1,200-acre (4.9 km^{2}) university campus was laid in 1955 by the first President of India Dr. Rajendra Prasad. It educates over 10,000 students from kindergarten to post-graduate and Ph.D. A Jawahar Navodaya Vidyalaya is located in Sardarshahar. Bal Mandir Senior Secondary School occupies a sprawling campus in the heart of town. The oldest school of sardarshahar are Seth Sampat Ram Dugar Uchha Madhyamik Vidhyalay and Buniyadi Uchha Sikshan Sansthan(also known as Basic school). Both schools are part of Gandhi vidya mandir. The oldest English medium school in the town is Krishna Public School which was opened in 1988. Other educational institutes are Rose Buds Public School which is 27 years old established in 1992, Balika Vidhyalaya, Mittal Girls College, Government Senior Secondary School, basic public school, Anjuman senior secondary school, Meera Niketan, maharana pratap school, Oxford Public School & Cambridge Convent school. The city also has teacher training institutions. Basic Teacher's Training College is among them.

== Language ==
Bagri language which is a dialect of Rajasthani language is spoken by majority of the people.

While Hindi and English are official language for government offices.

== Haveli ==
Some of the prominent and artistically important haveli (mansions) in the town are:

- Jammar Haveli ( जम्मड भवन हवेली ) The haveli of Punam Chand and Amar Chand Jammar. This haveli is about 185 years old (founded in 1873) and is notable for the paintings on it walls. The east wall of this haveli has a frieze depicting the story of Pabuji, the hero who, according to legend, introduced camels to Rajasthan. Other walls feature paintings from c. 1900 that depict scenes from the Mahabharata. The haveli also hosts friezes on the walls of its forecourt. It has two room whose walls are painted with real gold
- The haveli of Buddhmal Dugar has a "Mehfil" (room for concerts and entertainment) which has many unique and rare chandeliers as well as antique items. There are rooms whose walls and ceilings are made of glass and gold. The haveli which stands opposite to this haveli was also built by Buddhmal Dugar and is around 150 years old. It is said that "Pittarji Maharaj" (the benign spirit of an ancestor) resides there.
- The haveli of the late Baijnathji Chaudhary on Chaudhary Marg near Ghantaghar (clock tower) is about 125 years old and hosts frescos on its walls.
- The haveli of Shree Chand Vijay Kr Nahata is a modern as well as an ancient haveli. The haveli consists of rare chandelier made of rare elements and gold & has antiques made of sandalwood which are more than a century old.
- The haveli of Moolchand Malu, founder of KuberGroups, near Terapant Bhawan is a sight to watch.
- Gadhaiya's haveli has paintings and is a tourist spot.
- The haveli of late Ramlal Anoopchand Dugar, is 150 years old, has numerous rooms, including library, ceiling covered with carpet paintings, chandeliers & antique items. A blend of traditional & modern era. He also built Shardul Vyamshala (Gymnasium), which eventually opened for the public, free of cost. It currently runs on donation.

== Clock tower ==
The clock tower of Sardarshahar is the only clock tower in all of Asia that has streets running under it in all four directions. The clock tower is made of white marble. Its height is 60 feet and the upper minaret is 30 feet high. Anglo-Swiss watches from Switzerland are embedded on its four sides. This is a tourist attraction. The Sardarshahar clocktower is famous all over the world.

== Temples ==
Iccha Puran Balaji Temple is dedicated to the God Hanuman, colloquial referred to as "Balaji" in the region. It is located on SH-7. There is plenty of quality craft and sculpture work all over the temple complex. This temple was built by Seth Mulchand Malu, a businessman from Sardarshahar.

Shanti peeth - Jain temple and Smadhi of the world Jain acharya shri Mahapragya ji it is located on sh-7 (mega highway)

One of the oldest temples is "Shri Sachchiyay. Mataji (The Goddess of Truth) Mandir" worshiping by Pandit Rajeet Kumar Bhojak family member of Late. Sh. Arjun Ram Ji, located at Dugar school road.

Another temple is of Baba Ramdevji & Shani temple located on Dugar school road. Shani Dev temple is maintained by the Panchiram Pincha charitable trust and is located at Pincha Ka Baas, Meena Ka Kunva. An ancient Parshwanath Jain shwetamber mandir with carvings is also present here. Sadhan ka Thikana (the place where Sadhus stay) is a lecture hall and meditation center of the Terapanth Jain Oswal community. In addition to the existing place, a new huge building was constructed named Terapanth Bhawan on the Dugar Vidyalaya Road in the year 2010 when the tenth Acharya of Jain Terapanth sect Acharya Mahapragya spent four months here as " Chaumasa".

Satyanarayan Ji's temple is also a historical template, well known for its ancient architecture and is near Shyamsukha haveli. The other most famous temple is Shree Nath ji temple (related to Nath Sampradaya) established by Somnath Ji Maharaj.

One of the most famous and culturally important temples of Sardarshahar includes Rani Sati temple in 'Taal Maidaan'. Built in the 18th century, this temple is believed to have divine energies of the deity housed in this temple. It is visited by thousands of devotees especially during 'badi amavas' and 'mangsar navmi'. The "Taal Maidan" is a huge ground that also houses the government hospital built-in memory of Seth Chhotu Ram Sethia, a vyayamshala (exercise club), a Dharamshala built by Chhajer family and a charitable institute named Shrichand Bardia Rog Nidan Kendra built-in memory of his father by Sarup Chand Bardia.

== See also ==
- Sardarshahar Railway Station
- Sardarshahar (Rajasthan Assembly constituency)
