= Sadulpur Assembly constituency =

Constituency of the Rajasthan legislative assembly in India

Coordinates: 28.64°N 75.39°E

Sadulpur
- Constituency No. 19 for the Rajasthan Legislative Assembly

Constituency details
- Country: India
- Region: North India
- State: Rajasthan
- District: Churu
- Established: 1962
- Reservation: None

Member of Legislative Assembly
- 16th Rajasthan Legislative Assembly
- Incumbent Manoj Nyangli
- Party: SHS
- Alliance: NDA
- Elected year: 2023

Sadulpur is one of the constituencies of Rajasthan Legislative Assembly. It includes ILRC Rajgarh, ILRC Hamirawas Bara, ILRC Ragha Chhoti, ILRC Sankhoo, ILRC Chainpura Chhota and ILRC Sidhmukh, all in Rajgarh tehsil of Churu district. As of 2023, its representative is Manoj Kumar of the Shiv Sena.

== Members of the Legislative Assembly ==
Year	Name	Party
1962	Rawat Ram	Indian National Congress
1967	S Ram	Indian National Congress
1972	Ram Singh Rao	Indian National Congress
1974^	Mohar Singh	Communist Party of India
1977	Jaya Narain	Janata Party
1980	Deep Chand Kaswan	Independent
1985	Inder Singh Poonia	Indian National Congress
1990	Inder Singh Poonia	Indian National Congress
1993	Inder Singh Poonia	Indian National Congress
1998	Ram Singh Kaswan	Bharatiya Janata Party
2000^	Nand Lal Poonia	Indian National Congress
2003	Nand Lal Poonia	Indian National Congress
2008	Kamla Kaswan	Bharatiya Janata Party
2013	Manoj Nyangli	Bahujan Samaj Party
2018	Krishna Poonia	Indian National Congress
2023	Manoj Nyangli	Bahujan Samaj Party
2023	Manoj Nyangli	Shiv Sena

^By-Poll

== Election results ==
=== 2023 ===
2023 Rajasthan Legislative Assembly election: Sadulpur
Party	Candidate	Votes	%	±%
BSP	Manoj Kumar S/O Swai Singh	64,368	32.92	+3.66
INC	Krishna Poonia	61,794	31.6	−7.85
BJP	Sumitra Poonia	59,429	30.39	+1.94
CPI(M)	Sunil Kumar S/O Ram Pal	5,707	2.92	
NOTA	None of the above	860	0.44	−0.19
Majority		2,574	1.32	−8.87
Turnout		195,540	77.88	−1.76
BSP gain from INC		Swing		

=== 2018 ===
2018 Rajasthan Legislative Assembly election: Sadulpur
Party	Candidate	Votes	%	±%
INC	Krishna Poonia	70,020	39.45	
BSP	Manoj Nyangali	51,936	29.26	
BJP	Ram Singh Kaswan	50,492	28.45	
NOTA	None of the above	1,111	0.63	
Majority		18,084	10.19	
Turnout		177,498	79.64	
INC gain from		Swing		

== See also ==
- Member of the Legislative Assembly (India)
