= Ratangarh, Churu =

City in Rajasthan, India

Ratangarh
- Town
- Location in Rajasthan, India
- Coordinates: 28.0786567°N 74.6218778°E
- Country: India
- State: Rajasthan
- District: Churu
- Founder: Chieftain Kolha
- Named for: Ratan Singh

Government
  - Type: Municipality
  - Rank: 320 by Jeet Painkiller
- Elevation: 312 m (1,024 ft)

Population (2011)
  - Total: 71,124

Languages
  - Official: Hindi, English
  - Regional: Bagri
- Time zone: IST
- PIN: 331022
- Telephone code: +91 1567
- Vehicle registration: RJ-10

Ratangarh is a town and Tehsil of the Churu district in Rajasthan, India. Ratangarh was previously called Kolasar. It is famous for grand havelis (mansions) with frescoes, which is an architectural specialty of the Shekhawati region. Ratangarh is also famous for its handicraft work.

== History ==
According to historical documents, Ratangarh was founded by Surat Singh, the maharaja of Bikaner, in the year 1798 (Samvat 1855) while he was returning from Churu with his son Ratan Singh. He selected the place Kolasar and Rajia ki Dani for a new town and named it Ratangarh on his son's name. He handed over the responsibility to Purohit Hulashchand, Deepchand, and Charan Sidayach Shankar to build Ratangarh as a modern 1812 (Samvat 1869) during the layout of Ratangarh. According to some old people, present Ratangarh was built at Kolasar village, and Asha Charni (Lado Bhuwa) constructed Raghunathji temple.

A historical Devali was found near village Hudera just three kilometers from Ratangarh. This is located at MEGA HIGHWAY near by 220KV GSS, Devali of Samvat 1309 was found in an old Sidhan Jogioan Nath math. According to historians this Devali is nearly 750 years old. As per a text written on Devali, This Devali is the wife of Rathoor Nahardass when she became satti on Baishak sudi 1, Samvat 1309. A similar Devali was also found in Rajaldeshar near Ratangarh. This Devali called Rajasi ki Devali is also 475 years old. Samvat 1581, Ashad Sudi 10 is written on the Devali. An artistic slab stone of 11th Century engraved with dancing figures was found in Ratangarh which is now placed in Government Museum, Bikaner.

In the year 1812 (Samvat 1869) Ratangarh fort was also completed. It is said that Ratangarh fort was attacked two times by Thakur Prithvi Singh the son of Churu with the support of Maharaval Laxman Singh of Sikar in the year 1815 and 1816 (Samvat 1872and 1873). In both attacks caretakers of Fort Lalshah Syed and Purohit Jethmal were killed. According to famous historian Gourishankar Hirachand Ojha, Maharaja Ratan Singh held a meeting with Cornel Velsin in 1834 to organize the Shekhawati Brigade of English army.

Ratangarh was planned before construction and its bazaar is laid out in the design of a cross with shops painted like the town. The massive fort (garh) was constructed in the middle of the town with a boundary wall around the city with four gates. A second small fort was built in the city. But now the original fort and also the second fort has nothing left except for a few ruined monuments and now used as offices of civil courts. A Clock Tower is at the main crossing of the bazaar called Ghantagar.

Ratangarh is a place of well-known businessmen, learned people, great saints, literary persons, poets, vaidyas, artists and great patriots. Ratangarh was also called second Kashi due to its center of learning. Shri Hanuman Prasadji Poddar founder 'Kalyan' is an international figure. Shri Jeevanand Anand freedom fighter, Social worker who worked whole life for promotion of Sanskrit, vedshastra and puran. He had also established the value of Sanskrit education in Rajasthan through Rajasthan Rishikul Brahamcharyaashram-

Ratangarh region also remains a part of ancient culture. A 10th-century stone silalekh engraved with folk dance was found from an old temple now placed in the Bikaner museum. Ratangarh Mathadish Sivalaya was supposed to be built 200 years before the foundation of Ratangarh. Bikaner maharaja Sujan Singh (Year 100- 1735) gifted Kolasar village (present Ratangarh) to Charan Mala of Nath sect for his Rajasthani literature ' Gari bat doye'. Charan Mala built 'Karniji temple' in Kolasar which now at the heart of the town. Sidhan Math of Nath sect in Hudera village is said to be built in the early 10th century.

With the efforts of Maharaja Ganga Singh railway station built in 1910 and electricity was availed in 1930. Water Works was built and Water to houses was introduced in 1945 by Seth Durgadutt Anantram Thard. Seth Soorajmull Jalan, Seth Sitaram Bhuwalka, Seth Naarmal Bajoria, Seth Shankarlal Bajoria and Seth Jethmal Dhanuka were the main contributors to develop the town in the present form. They laid network of roads( in 1945), opened hospital (1939), schools and colleges, public library, parks and several charitable societies.

== Geography ==
Ratangarh is located at 28.08°N 74.6°E. It has an average elevation of 312 metres (1023 feet).

Ratangarh is situated in the Thar Desert, on the dhoras (large sand dunes). Some neighborhoods in town are named after these dhoras.

== Government ==
Currently Shri Pusaram Godara from Congress is the MLA of this seat.

== Notable structures ==
The Raja of Bikaner, Surat Singh, built a massive fort at Ratangarh in 1820 AD. The marketplace of the town is in the shape of a cross suggesting that the city was planned before construction. An array of stately Havelis line the main crossing, which is also graced by a Clock Tower. The town is the site of a major power station, supplying electricity is supplied from Ratangarh up to Jaipur.

The Soorajmull Jalan family, which was once one of the ten wealthiest families in India, has contributed to the city by constructing over 20 structures including hospitals, schools, libraries, and sporting centers. The clock tower, roads, colleges and schools in this city have been donated by the Jalan family, which is now based in Kolkata.

== Connectivity ==
Ratangarh Junction is a major rail head in northern Rajasthan, connecting Bikaner and Jodhpur to Delhi via railways.

Ratangarh is situated in National Highway 11 (running between Bikaner, Jaipur, and Agra).

Ratangarh is the center as it connects all the major cities in Rajasthan including Jaipur, Bikaner, Sardarshahr and Sujangarh and many small towns.

It also connects the northern tip of Rajasthan (Hanumangarh-Sriganganagar) to Jaipur and Ajmer through the High-speed State Megahighway system; roads are in place between Hanumangarh and Ratangarh, and between Ratanagarh and Ajmer.

== Train Connectivity ==
=== Trains from Ratangarh to other States ===
Direct trains to Delhi, Kolkata, Guwahati, Hyderabad, Coimbatore, Mumbai, Goa, Ahemdabad, Jammu, Jaiselmer, Bikaner, Jodhpur, Hisar & Haridwar.

== Demographics ==
As of 2011 India census, Ratangarh had a population of 71,124. Males constitute 51.11% of the population and females 48.89%. Ratangarh has an average literacy rate of 75%, higher than the national average of 59.5%; male literacy is 73%, and female literacy is 77%. In Ratangarh, 14% of the population is under 6 years of age. Area of Ratangarh is 40.16 square kilometre.
