= Churu, Rajasthan =

Churu
- City
- Location in Rajasthan, India Churu (India)
- Coordinates: 28.30°N 74.95°E
- Country: India
- State: Rajasthan
- District: Churu

Government
  - Type: Municipal Council
  - Body: Churu Municipal Council
- Elevation: 292 m (958 ft)

Population (2011)
  - Total: 119,856

Languages
  - Official: Hindi and Rajasthani
- Time zone: UTC+5:30 (IST)
- PIN: 331001
- Telephone code: 01562 / +91-1562
- Vehicle registration: RJ-10
- Website: Churu Municipal Council; Churu District
- Famous for temples, Havelies, Sand Dunes, Forest reserve

Churu is a city in the Sekhawati region of Rajasthan state of India. It is known as the gateway to the Thar Desert of Rajasthan. It is the administrative headquarter of Churu District. It lies in the Thar Desert on the National Highway 52 connecting Sangrur to Ankola and is a junction station on the railway line to Bikaner. It is near the shifting sand dunes of the Thar Desert and has grand havelis with marvelous fresco paintings, namely Kanhaiya Lal Bagla Ki Haweli and Surana Haweli, with hundreds of small windows. It also has some fine Chhatris. Near the town is a religious seat of the Nath sect of Sadhus where there are life-size marble statues of their deities and a place for prayers. At the center of the town is a fort built about 500 years ago.

== History ==
Churu was founded by a jaat chief of kaaler Clan, chuhru singh

in the 16th century.[2]

== Economy ==
Churu economy is mainly based on small industries of embroidery and painting.

Shri Salasar Balaji Temple located in Salasar was the part of district. But after division it was shifted in Sujangarh district. Shri Babosa Dham is situated in the city.

As about eight Tehsils lie in Churu district with more than 900 villages along with 248 panchayats and about two million population, the economy of the town and surrounding area is mainly based on animal husbandry and hand embroidery work done by women. Due to the climatic conditions, the scope of agriculture is very low in Churu. Many women here are engaged in hand embroidery.

The main source of income for the people living in rural areas of Churu is from dairy.

Churu has a small market for a few agricultural produce of the area. The town has an Agricultural Produce Market Committee. The Food Corporation of India has its warehouses in Churu. The town is the main supply point for surrounding villages.

There is no medium or large size industry in the industrial area. The very few small-scale industries are granite slabs and tiles, cutting and polishing, and mustard seed crushing. The city is organized around Kalera Bass surrounding many areas like Chandani Chowk, Adarsh Nagar, Balmiki Basti, Mochiwarah and Subhash Chowk.

== Geography and climate ==
Churu has an average elevation of 292 m (958 ft). Churu is encircled by large shifting sand dunes. The area is scanty in vegetation. Phoge and Kair bushes and Khejri/Khejra (Prosopis cineraria), Royara and Babul trees are mainly found on the sand dunes. One can find sand dunes all over the area with a couple of small limestone hills.

=== Climate ===
Churu has a hot semi arid climate (Koppen: BSh), getting most of its rain during the monsoon season in the summer.

Temperatures in Churu usually range from 0 to 50 °C (32 to 122 °F). The region boasts record temperatures ranging from below freezing point in the winters to over 50 degrees in the summer afternoons. Before dawn in the months of December and January one may not be surprised to notice ice in small waterpots or frozen water dews on the little vegetation. Yet one may find that summer nights are cooler and winter days are warmer. There is a great variation in the minimum and the maximum temperature of Churu. Churu's lowest recorded temperature is −4.6 °C (23.7 °F) and highest temperature ever recorded is 50.8 °C (123.4 °F) on 1 and 2 June 2019. Even in 2020, Churu recorded a maximum of 50 °C (122 °F). On 30 December 2020, Churu recorded −1.5 °C (29.3 °F), the coldest December night in 46 years. On May 28, 2024, Churu recorded all time high for May at 50.5 °C (122.9 °F).

Climate data for Churu (1991–2020, extremes 1956–present)
Month	Jan	Feb	Mar	Apr	May	Jun	Jul	Aug	Sep	Oct	Nov	Dec	Year
Record high °C (°F)	33.4 (92.1)	37.4 (99.3)	43.0 (109.4)	46.5 (115.7)	50.5 (122.9)	50.8 (123.4)	48.6 (119.5)	43.1 (109.6)	44.1 (111.4)	42.6 (108.7)	38.4 (101.1)	33.5 (92.3)	50.8 (123.4)
Mean daily maximum °C (°F)	22.4 (72.3)	26.8 (80.2)	33.3 (91.9)	39.4 (102.9)	42.6 (108.7)	41.7 (107.1)	38.2 (100.8)	36.6 (97.9)	36.9 (98.4)	35.9 (96.6)	30.8 (87.4)	25.6 (78.1)	34.3 (93.7)
Mean daily minimum °C (°F)	5.6 (42.1)	9.6 (49.3)	15.2 (59.4)	21.0 (69.8)	26.4 (79.5)	28.4 (83.1)	27.7 (81.9)	26.4 (79.5)	24.3 (75.7)	18.2 (64.8)	11.1 (52.0)	6.0 (42.8)	18.5 (65.3)
Record low °C (°F)	−4.6 (23.7)	−4.6 (23.7)	1.8 (35.2)	8.8 (47.8)	11.8 (53.2)	17.7 (63.9)	19.1 (66.4)	19.6 (67.3)	14.0 (57.2)	8.1 (46.6)	−1.0 (30.2)	−4.6 (23.7)	−4.6 (23.7)
Average rainfall mm (inches)	7.0 (0.28)	11.8 (0.46)	10.4 (0.41)	6.9 (0.27)	27.3 (1.07)	56.5 (2.22)	129.4 (5.09)	111.9 (4.41)	50.8 (2.00)	8.5 (0.33)	3.0 (0.12)	2.6 (0.10)	426.2 (16.78)
Average rainy days	0.8	1.1	1.1	0.8	2.2	3.8	6.4	5.9	2.8	0.7	0.3	0.2	26.1
Average relative humidity (%) (at 17:30 IST)	39	29	22	16	19	31	51	57	45	31	35	39	35
Source: India Meteorological Department

== Demographics ==
As per 2001 census of India, Churu had a population of 97,627.

Males constituted 52% of the population and the remaining females. Churu has an average literacy rate of 62%, higher than the national average of 59.5%; male literacy is 72% and female literacy is 51%. In Churu, 17% of the population is under six years of age. As per the provisional reports of the census of India, the population of Churu in 2011 is 119,846, constituting 61,771 males and 58,075 females respectively.

== Infrastructure ==
Transport Churu railway station is a junction station on Delhi-Rewari-Bikaner route. A train that runs from Delhi to Bikaner via Churu also connects to Jaipur via Sikar. The railway track to Jaipur was meter gauge and now converted to broad gauge and operational. Churu lies on NH 52 and is connected to all major cities (Kaithal) by all-weather roads.

Electricity There is one sub-grid station of 220 KV at Churu. The town receives power from Power Grid Corporation of India's grid station in Hissar, Haryana. Almost all villages of the Churu sub division are electrified.

Water The town gets drinking water from local wells which is hard and brackish. The town area drinking water supply is managed by the water department of the Government of Rajasthan. The government is trying to get drinking water for the area from Indira Gandhi Canal. The main source of irrigation for farmers continues to be rain water and wells at a few places.

Safe Water Network India in association with Bhoruka Charitable Trust has augmented natural water storage at homes through Rooftop Rain Water Harvesting by creating household wells and has also refurbished existing community wells to provide water to families living in huts and children in schools. This initiative has reduced the drudgery of women and the children in this water-challenged region of Rajasthan.

Education The town has a medical college:Pandit Deendayal Upadhyaya Medical College, Churu and four post-graduate colleges: Government Lohia College, Swami Gopaldas Government Girls College, Balika Mahavidalya affiliated to Maharaja Ganga Singh University and Government Law College affiliated to Dr. Bhimrao Ambedkar Law University.

There are several higher secondary, secondary and primary schools in Churu. Major schools of Churu are: Kendriya Vidyalaya, Lords International School, Little Flower School, Shri Jain Swetambar Terapanthi Sen. Sec. School, The Walden Pond Sr. Sec. School, Lakshmipat Singhania Academy, Adarsh Vidya Mandir, Montessori School, Goenka School and Bagla Senior Secondary School which is the oldest school of Shekhawati region established by Bhagwandas Bagla. Pandit Deendayal Upadhyaya Medical College, Churu

NGOs There are few NGOs in the town, including Navyuvak Mandal Mithi Redu, Manav Pragati Sansthan, Prayas Sansthan, Marudhar Yuva Sansthan, Dudhwa Mitha, Asgar Khan Advocate Charitable Trust.

Telecommunications Many telecommunications service companies such as BSNL, Vodafone, Airtel, Tata DoCoMo and Idea have their network in Churu. Internet and fax services are also available. Tata Teleservices caters the rural telephony in the villages having base of 70,000 users in villages.

Hospitals Churu has good medical facilities with Medical college. The town has a government hospital along with few private hospitals like the Hirawat Heart Care Centre and Bhanu Hospital. There is also an Ayurvedic hospital in Churu.

Sports The town has a sports stadium. It has indoor and outdoor games facilities. It has the infrastructure to hold yearly state-level tournaments. Adventure sports like Parasailing, Paramotoring, Rappelling are also organized in Churu.

Banking Many nationalised banks Central Bank of India, Punjab National Bank, Bank of Baroda, State Bank of India, ICICI Bank, Axis Bank and HDFC Bank have branches in Churu. Some co-operative banks like Churu Central Cooperative Bank and Bhumi Vikas Bank also have branches in the town.

Library The town has a public library called Shri Sagar Jain Jila Pustkalaya.

== Administration ==
District Collector and District Magistrate of Churu is Shri Siddharth Sihag and Superintendent of Police is Shri Rajesh Kumar Meena. Churu constituency elects one member to the Vidhan Sabha (Rajasthan State Assembly) & one to Lok Sabha (Indian Parliament)

== Notable people ==
- Laxmi Niwas Mittal, Chairman & CEO of ArcelorMittal. Born in Sadulpur Town Churu District.
- Mohar Singh Rathore, social reformer and MLA & MP of Churu.
- Bhanwar Singh Samaur, writer, historian and poet of Rajasthani and Hindi.
- Bharat Vyas, Indian lyricist who wrote the songs for Hindi films in the 1950s and 1960s
- Kishan Singh Rathore, one of the first recipients of the Mahavir Chakra.
- Bhanwarlal Sharma, member of Legislative Assembly.
- Rajendra Rathore, MLA from Churu constituency and Rural Development Minister in Government of Rajasthan.
- Subhash Chandra Lakhotia, cytogeneticist

== See also ==
- Churu District
- Churu (Lok Sabha Constituency)
- Ramgarh, Sikar
