= Chahal =

Chahal may refer to:

== Places ==
- Chahal, Kasur, a village in Pakistan
- Chahal Konar, village in Khuzestan, Iran
- Chahal, a municipality in Guatemala
- Chahal Kalan, a village in Batala, India
- Sallo Chahal, a village in Batala, India
- Janian Chahal, village in Shahkot, India
- Chahal Kalan, village in Batala, India

== People ==
- Ajit Chahal (born 1995), Indian cricketer
- Gavie Chahal (born 1978), Indian actor
- Gurbaksh Chahal (born 1982), Indian-American internet entrepreneur
- Jessy Chahal, Indian-Malaysian actress and TV host
- Kavita Chahal (born 1985), Indian boxer
- Mahek Chahal (born 1979), Indian-Norwegian actress and model
- Nahla Chahal, Lebanese writer, journalist, researcher and activist
- Randa Chahal, Lebanese film director, producer and screenwriter
- Saimo Chahal, British-Indian lawyer
- Simi Chahal, Indian film actress
- Sonia Chahal, Indian boxer
- Yuzvendra Chahal (born 1990), Indian cricketer and chess player
