= Janian (disambiguation) =

Janian is a village in Shahkot tehsil, Jalandhar district of Punjab, India.

Janian may also refer to:

- Janian Chahal, a village in Shahkot tehsil, Jalandhar district of Punjab, India
- Janian Village, a village in Amritsar I tehsil, Amritsar district, Punjab, India
- Janian, SBS Nagar, a village in Shaheed Bhagat Singh Nagar district, Punjab, India
