= Ginadi =

Ginadi Ginadi tibba
- Location in Rajasthan, India
- Coordinates: 28.31°N 74.96°E
- Country: India
- State: Rajasthan
- District: Churu District

Government

Population (2001)
  - Total: 998

Languages
  - Official: Hindi
- Time zone: UTC+5:30 (IST)
- PIN: 331001
- Telephone code: 91-1562
- Vehicle registration: RJ-10
- Distance from Churu: 18 kilometres (11 mi) SW (land)
- Avg. summer temperature: 46 °C (115 °F)
- Avg. winter temperature: 1 °C (34 °F)

Ginadi is a village in the Churu administrative region of the eastern corner of the Churu district of Rajasthan, India. The village is over 450 years old and lies north-east of Churu and 25 kilometres (16 mi) from Churu town. Bordering villages include Ranwa Ki Dhani, Lalasar, Ginadi Taal, Inderpura, Thalori and Bhamasi.

The 43 bigha village has an overall population of 998.

== Pre-Indian Independence ==
One view is that some 450 years ago, there was a jagayat centre (authorised resting place for travellers on payment) on the way (sub trade route Taranagar (RINI) - Churu). The jagayti (contractor owner of the place) had to pay 1 gini (a gold coin equal to 1/2 of a mohar). The centre, therefore, was called Giniwala.

During the war between Rai Sigh Rathore (a son of the Bika Rathore of then newly established state Bikaner) and the Poonia chief Kanha Deo of Jhansal (near Hissar) many Poonia families were displaced. One Ramkishan Poonia family migrated from the village Binjawas (Rajgadh) to adjoining area of Shekhawati region Neema ki dhani. The Poonia family along with the families of ancestors of Deepa Karel, ancestors of Roopdas Swami and ancestors of Balaram Meghwal further displaced reached the Giniwala Jagayat - centre and established their dhani (residence) there.

=== Relics ===
The "Theh" (remains of earthen pots) at Rathion Ki Dhani and south of the village site at farmlands of Kanaram Kulhari and Richhpal Poonia. The Babal Kunds and the Chhatri there, the Bodia Kua and the memorial chabutra of Meghrajot Singh near or under the house of Ramnarayan.

=== Village administration ===
The village along with 24 others was under the jagir of Rajpura Thakur. Poonia, Udaram and his ancestors, were village Choudhary and Meghwal the village Kotwal. The Choudhary collected land revenue (Rakam) and arbitrated the village disputes. The Kotwal functioned as Ahalkar (messenger-cum-attendant) of the Thakur and Choudhary. Due to untimely death of Choudhary Rajuram and his ailing son Surjaram Poonia, Chimnaram Tetarwal was appointed as co-choudhary of the village 20 years before abolition of the jagirdari system.

=== Housing and construction ===
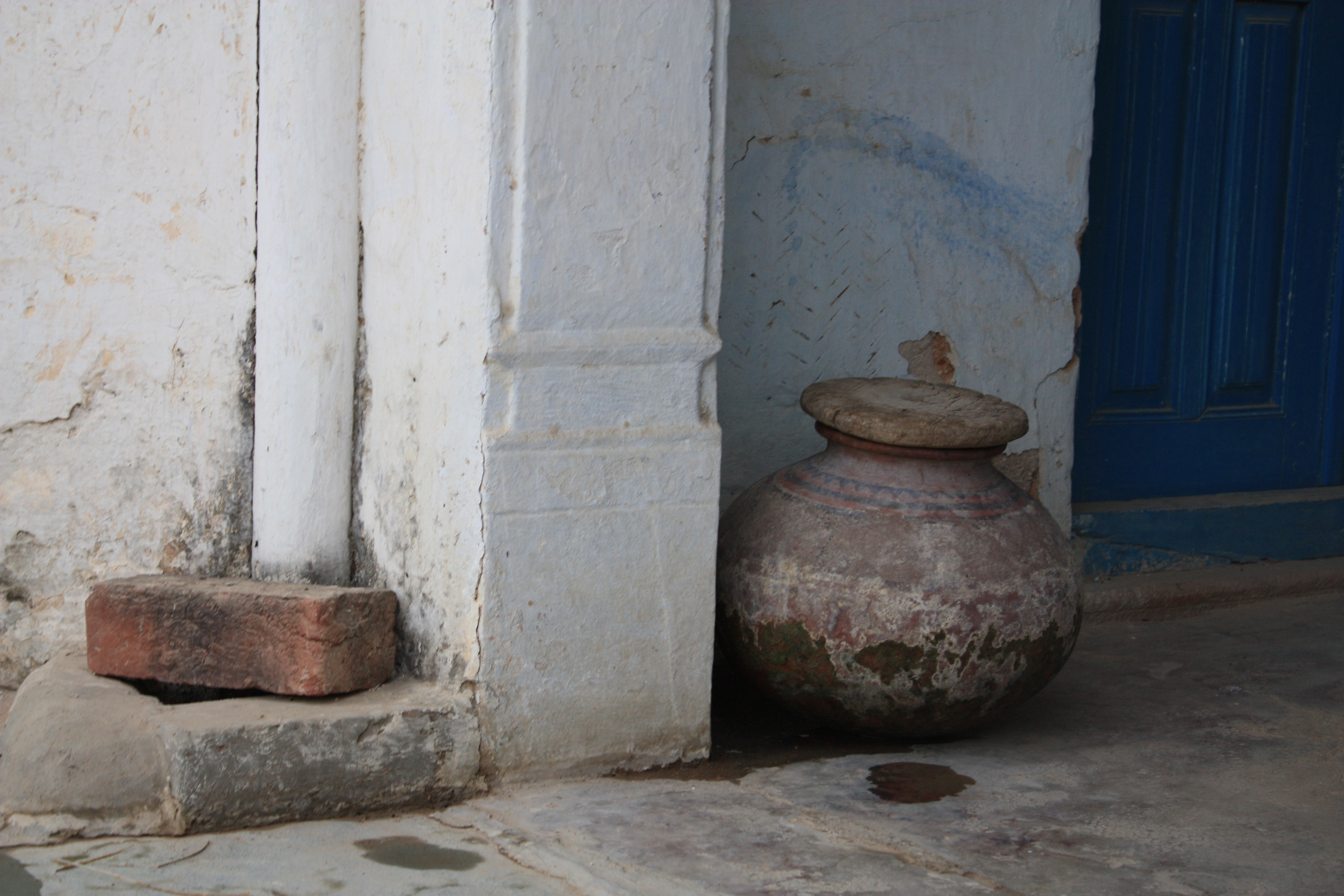
Matka in the Village

In the past there were huts and Saals (room built with clay and limestone and with thatched ceiling). The first pakka room (built with chuna (baked limestone) and khor (nodules of clay) used with Dhandhla stone) was built by Motaram Poonia followed by Bhinwam chamar, Chimnaram Tetarwal & Udaram Poonia. The four rooms, kua, johra, three kunds (Babal kunds along with the Babal chhatri and the memorial chabutra) were the only pakka structures before independence.

== After independence ==
=== Village government ===
The village is governed by Panchayati Raj System. In the first panchayat election, the village along with 14 others, was under Sehjusar gram PANCHYAT. Later on it became part of Inderpura panchayat and now it is a part of Lalasr Banirotan. Presently out of total 9 members of the panchayat 3 panchas are elected from Ginadi. The panchayat is under Vikas Samiti Churu. It is part of the Churu MLA constituency. During first two panchayats, Nyay Samitis at panchayat levels were also constituted. Ch. Magaram Poonia of the village was elected member of the nyay Samiti. Secretary Panchayat, Patwari, Gram Sewak, Vyavsthapak cooperative society, waterman, lineman & Sathin Aanganbari Kendra are village-level government functionaries. The village is under Dudhwakhara police station.

=== Village economy ===
Almost all the families of the village are engaged in farming. However, some members of the families are engaged in services & other activities. There are three male government teachers, two female government teachers, five private school teachers, five nurses, one railway, one in the RAC, three state policemen, six in army, three in water Works department, five retired Havildars, 22 work in Arab countries, there are two accountants, one retired government PG college principal, one private college lecturer, two engineers, three (MBA) managers, two lawyers & twenty persons working in factories outside the village. As can be seen from these figures, out of the 220 families (houses) more than 85 villagers are employed in occupations other than agriculture.

There are four private schools established and operated by the villagers, two in the village and two at Jodhpur.

Apart from agriculture, live-stock activities are also carried on in the village, almost every household has some sort of animals with it. There are ten 'Rewads'(a herd of sheep and goats), 30 camels, 60 cows with one village bull, 160 buffaloes with a common "Jhota" (he buffalo), two mares and four donkeys. The village is counted as one of the best villages in the tehsil. Almost every household has a pakka room with pakki boundaries & there are good havelis.

But as compared with the position of the village some 50 years ago, in general, the financial position has worsened. Then, out of 125 households only 25 houses were indebted, but now out of 220 households more than 160 are indebted. Thus indebtedness has risen from 20% to more than 75%.

Reasons of rise in indebtedness are many. On one hand are positive changes in lifestyle, raising of living standards, now people eat better, wear better clothes, use amenities and facilities seen in towns. Villagers spend on education, transportation, and medication. But the biggest setback has been the adverse farming conditions. In the past, every member of the family earned: children raised livestock, ghee was sold to arrange for groceries, every bye-product of farming - woods, fodder etc. - fetched a hefty income. The costs in farming were little, medical expenses almost non-existent, no expense on water-electricity, no education expense, no transportation expense; no expense on detergents & cosmetics. The expenses were very few since the living standards were low and even little income led to an economy of surplus & self-reliance. In addition, farmers do not know where their interests lie. They support rallies that seek to curb prices of farm produce in guise of controlling inflation. As a matter of fact such rallies are to benefit other sections of society at the cost of the farmer.

=== Transportation ===
Ginadi is connected by a two lane asphalt road to Churu. Churu Railway station, 25 kilometres (16 mi) from Ginari is the nearest railway station, which is well connected to Jaipur, Delhi and other cities.

Asphalt roads connect the village to surrounding villages. The first village road connecting it to Churu - Taranagar road was built 1n 2006 with the efforts of the villagers under the leadership of Prof. Shivram poonia and his cousin 'sarpanch' (Gram Panchayat head) sh. Chokharam poonia. Camel carts and bullock carts were formerly the chief means of transportation and are being replaced by cycles and other automobiles.

In the rainy season, womenfolk can be seen bringing grass on their heads for cows and buffaloes.

=== Academics ===
Primary school was established by the government in 1961–62. The school started in a khuddi (a room with mud walls and grass roof). Two pakka rooms were constructed by the villagers in 1963. Now the school has been upgraded to middle level with 8 rooms and 300 students on its roll. Two private primary schools are also operating in the village.

== Religion ==
All the villagers follow the Hindu religion.

=== Local deities ===
- Thakurji: the oldest temple in the village; The Swami clan as its priest; owning a "Dohli" (tax-free farm-land allotted by the state for sustenance of the priest family); actually it is a Krishna temple but called Thakurji perhaps due to influence of erstwhile Thakurs (jagirdars); the priest daily in the morning takes a ferry to each house and says "jai thakurji" and in turn gets some floor. The villagers go to the temple on the occasions of birth, marriage and death. The temple was housed in a mud-walled room till 1980 when the employees of the village, under leadership of prof. Shiv Ram Poonia, got constructed full 'pakka' temple with installation of statues('Pran pratistha').
- Gogaji is a Chauhan chieftain born in nearby Jodi village to mata (mother) Bachhal with the blessing of Guru Gorakh Nath and blessed by him to be lord of snakes> He owned the famous magical mere Keshar Kalvi and fought against the plunders to protect cows, and was exiled by his mother due to his killing of his cousins Arjan-Sharjan. He prayed "Kalma" (a religious mantra of the Muslims) and took "Jinwat Smadhi" (lively going in the earth) and therefore called Goga peer, perhaps the only deity worshiped by both the Hindus and the Muslims, his "smadhi-sathal" (death place) Gogamedi near Bhadra tehsil is an India level pilgrim centre.
- In Ginadi there was only a "than" (a small triangular structure symbolic of a "medi" (full temple) till 2007 when a'pakki' medi was constructed by the villagers under the leadership of haveldar Ishar ram Ishran..In the months of Shrawan-Bhadwa, village girls go to it and offer water while singing and praying for protection from snakes. snake-bites in the area are most common in the months of Shrawan-Bhadwa; snake-bitten person is brought to the medi and a tanti (a thread embedded with the feather of peacock) is tied to him as an antidote. If not, a "thali of Kansi" (plate of alloy) is applied to his back by an expert and the poison is sucked by it. Eighth day of the month of Bhadwa is observed as Goga-day; a "prashad" (blessed offering) of chitki (a piece of coconut) and kheer (a liquid preparation of milk-rice) is offered on this day. The Bhakat (devotee priest) prays for landing of "Jewdees" (rope like poison -less snakes) and if not obliged, punishes himself with a "Shankal" (a ring with iron spokes). The moment is surcharged with emotions for the onlookers.
- Mawliaji, also called MahamayaJi, is goddess mother of children; there is a 'than' of the deity two km south of the village, along with a pasture land of some 30 bighas attached to it. The place of the deity is one of its kind in the area and devotees from hundreds of km come to it for worship and to pray for the well-being of their newborn babies. One time worship of the goddess is considered mandatory for every newborn baby.
- Gudganvwali Mata for the clan of Harjans, Karni Mata for the clan of Rajputs, Sedh Mata, Malasi ka Mamliaji, Khetarpalji, Bhomiaji and Peerji (peerji ka jaant at Manglaram Tetarwal ka Kheda) and Netji are village deities; Netji and Harsh are also clan deities for Poonia while Gossainji for Ishrans.

== Water resources ==
Underground water is saline. Underground wells and johdas were main source of water for animals and domestic requirements. Drinking water was fetched from the nearby village Inderpura.

A Kui कुई (a narrow vertical tunnel dug to the underground water level) on the west of bodia kua बोड़िया कुआ was built 200 years ago. During the severe drought of Vikram Samvat 1995 to 1996, under the inspiration of ch. Chimnaram Tetarwal, a 'pakka kua’ was built by Seth Jaydyalji Goenka of Churu. Later a 60x60x15 (feet cube) size pakka johda along with a 30x15x10 ft size Gaughat were built.

There were 4 community kuis of Poonia, Sunda, Thakur, and Tetarwal. The well was operated through a bid system. Livestock heads were counted and per head bidding rates invited. Water was drawn with the help of bullocks. The well was operated daily in the morning and evening. The songs by the "kuadias" कुआडिया (two men operating the well) at 4 AM were used to be very refreshing and enlightening. In the evening, operating time of the well was very lively and entertaining. Both of the elders and the youth would gather in the "Guaad" गुआड़ (courtyard in the common land); overtly gossiping and discussing village news. But their main attraction would be the "Paniharins" पनिहारीं (the newly wed brides in a flock along with their young sisters-in-law going to fetch water from the well). They used to dress themselves in the best of their decorated traditional attires and ornaments. The elders stealthily glancing and the youths openly and closely; but the moments would be exotic to both.

During the month of Falgun, the "Rasiyas"(the men in a group dancing, singing and playing on 'Damphs'- circular drums- on the eve of Holi festival) performing with all the vigour and gusto at the time of 'panghat'( the system of fetching water from the village well), the occasion becomes frenetic, memorable to any body to the extent of envy.

There were only three Kunds of Poonia, Tetarwal & Meghwal. They were underground tanks with tomb shaped "Dhoala" & pakka catchment area to store rain water, the tanks were cylindrical shaped to withstand pressure of water & their inner sides were coated with a Sunla of Singraj powder to stop leakage of water. The tanks were main source of precious drinkable water and were cleaned of dirt annually and occasionally sprayed with "Gangajal" to prevent pollution.

In 1974–75, Under the inspiration of Prof. Shiv Ram Poonia, a new well was constructed by Seth Kanhailal Dugar of Sardarshahr and handed over to Public Health Engineering Department PHED. Almost every house of the village was connected to the storage tanks through pipelines. Recently the village has been connected to German water supply system.

=== Electrification ===
The village was electrified in 1980 due to personal efforts by the villagers under the leadership of late ch. Rikhuram Poonia. The villagers bought Rural Electrification Bonds of Rs.5,000 (then five thousand!) in order to get electric connectivity; the bonds are still pending redemption due to negligence of the descendants of the buyers.

== Johda जोह्ड़ा (Common grazing land) ==
The johdas are earthen ponds with large catchment areas meant for storage of rain water inside Charagah (grazing) lands for animals. The Johdas include Kalra कालरा (biggest and best with kalar clays famous for preserving water up to 9 months a year and connected to village with Goha गोहा (a wide strip of land meant for animal transit). Kesana (best pasture land) was connected to village with a Goha. Sujania सुजानिया, Mawliaji ki johadi मावलिआजी की जोहड़ी are located at village kankad कांकड़(border). Others are- Ram talai राम तलाई, Gangania गंगानिया, Khatayani खातायानी, dumani डुमानी, Pichparani पिचपरानी, Johadia जोहडिया and village Beed बीड़. The total area under these johra जोह्ड़ा was roughly 500 bigha but due to negligence of the villagers and carelessness of the administration, nearly 100 bigha land of common village pastureland stands encroached for farming. The Johria जोहडिया, village beed बीड़, and the gohas गोहा are completely encroached while others are only peripherally encroached.

== Society and culture ==
Village society is governed solely by Hindu rituals although the younger generation has been affected by western cultural influences. Parda, the practice of using veils to cover the face and other parts of the body is discouraged.

=== Festivals ===
Villagers celebrate all major Hindu festivals. Some of the major festivals are Holi, Deepawali, Makar Sankranti, Raksha Bandhan, Sawan, Teej, and Gauga Peer, Gangaur.

The saying 'तीज त्योंहरा बावड़ी हाड़ो ले डूबी गंगोर' (festivals begin with Teej and end with Gangor) speaks chronology of Hindu festivals. Each of the festival has its own peculiarity and logic regarding time of observance, motive, celebration and usefulness.

==== Teej ====
- The 3rd day of the Shrawan month, the day of 'surangi' (colorful) Teej; middle of rainy season; greenery all around; rows and columns of dark clouds disbursing rains everywhere. The festival celebrates the youthfulness of the nature and humanity. The newlywed daughters are brought to their parental homes. They, singing folk songs on the theme of love and nature, go to village ponds and take bath. Young ladies in pairs can be seen taking ride on "Jhula" (swing made from grass rope, two ropes suspended from a branch of a tree and tied to a foot board to stand on). Kheer is cooked in every home.

==== Dipawali ====
The 15th day of Kartik-month at the beginning of winter season, Khareef crops are ready for harvesting, local fruits are ready in plenty, sisters are brought to parental home from their in-laws place, all the members working away from home in foreign lands return home. The festival is observed to worship Goddess Laxmi- seeking wealth, prosperity and peace; celebrations begin from "Dhan Teras" followed by Kanti Dipawali. On the night of 15th, every house is illuminated with "Diya" (small earthen lamps lighted with ghee/oil). Worship is performed by hanging pictures of Laxmi along with Lord Ganesha and putting jewelry and cash interspersed with 'roli', incense, 'prasad' (of cooked rice with ghee and 'shakkar'- powdered gur), dipak of ghee and an ember. The family members dressed in best attires assemble, head lady offers ghee on the ember, if the emerging flame is connected to the flame of the dipak goddess is supposed to be attentive for worship. The lady calls the family members one by one, ties a "Suha naal" (auspicious coloured thread) on the wrist and applies "Tilak" (spot of liquid vermilion/roli on the fore head) or "vibhuti" (burnt ash of the auspicious ember) on the fore head) and the member prays for prosperity/ individual aspirations.

- "Dhan Teras" - (13th, the auspicious day for wealth), people buy precious metals, new utensils, vehicles etc.
- Kanti Dipawali- 14th is day for Kanti Dipawali (dipawali without lights).
- Govardhan-The next day to Dipawali is for "Govardhan" ( Lord of the most useful animal- cow) worship and "Raam-rumi" (greeting in the name of lord Rama). A heap of cow dung along with local fruits is put at the gate of every house. The villagers take ferry to each other's house, say raam-rumi and accept sweets.
- The last of the celebrations is "Bhaiya-dooj"(the 2nd day of dipawali for brothers); sisters oblige brothers for remembering and bringing them to parental home to participate in the celebrations.
- The boys of the village start playing of "Hidda-lighting" (tied beams of straws) 15 days before dipawali. In the early night, they gather at the outskirts of the village; light their hiddas, dance, race and sing folk songs. Nice opportunity to prove one's efficiency, making friends and entertaining. How colorful, attractive and purposeful the festival! Children used to count months and days ahead of Dipawali. Interesting to note that in contrast to the cities, no crackers were exploded in the villages during diwali celebrations.

==== Holi ====
The end of Falgun month; lively fauna and flora; spring season spreads its smell all around; villagers having harvested their crops in leisure ready to enjoy the season. The occasion is Holi festival; the festival of revelries for toiling masses in contrast to Dipawali for affluent ones.

- According to mythology Holika, sister of mighty demon Hiranyakashipu, had a magical Choonri (a decorated coloured cloth for woman to cover head and wrap around the body) with a boon that anything covered with it would be immune to fire. She tried to burn child "Bhakat" (devotee and worshipper of any god) Prahalad by covering herself with the choonri and taking the child in her lap and setting fire on but the child remained unscathed while Holika burnt to ashes. The victory of truth (Prahalad) over evil (holika) is legend of celebrating Holi. Victory of Prahalad but celebration in the name of Holika, perhaps due to feudal influence in latter stage.
- Holi celebrations start from "fullariya-dooj"(the 2nd day of Falgun when flowers are in full bloom), playing on chang or "Daph" (a drum of round circular frame of wood covered with skin of sheep) starts from this day. The Daph is held on shoulder near the ear and beaten/struck with the flap of the palm of hand/fingers. Every evening, a group of people (called 'Rasiya') play on daph while dancing on knees and singing folk ballads in a rhythm at different pitches. The saga is called "Dhamal". Young girls play "Loor" (a dance with measured steps and stanza of a song by each participant). On the day of Holi, a small tree of khejri is planted in the midst of "Bhintka" (a heap of straws of a thorny bush) on the outskirts of the village. In the evening, the villagers gather at the spot; the girls throw 'Badkulia' बड्कुलिया (a garland of cow dung pieces) on the Holika, the village head offers a coconut, the 'rasiyas' play on daph, the children explode crackers and Holi is set on fire. Meanwhile, unmarried youth, aspirant of marriage at the earliest, takes out the planted tree (Prahalad) and 'holika' is burnt to ashes. The wise farmers read omens from the direction of the flames of burning 'Holika' and voice of birds etc.; others symbolically plough their farms and throw their 'Matira' (a fruit of watermelon category) through the flames and thus the celebration is over. The sweet diet is rice with ghee- shakar.
- At night all the villagers gather in the village courtyard to play "Gindhad"(Dandya dance in circle around the 'Nagara' - a big drum). The next day is observed as 'Dhulandi'. All the villagers along with 'rasiyas' take a ferry (procession called 'Gehar') to each house demanding sweats and wine on this or that count. Thus Holi, the most important festival of the villagers, is a good forum for entertainment and strengthening brotherhood.

==== Makar Sankranti ====
In the month of Magh, every year fixed on 14 January, when the sun has entered the zodiac sign of Capricorn, signaling end of winter in the northern hemisphere, the festival of makar-sankranti is observed to propitiate the sun god to protect us from the evil effects of astral bodies. Oil based foods - bada, gudgala, pua, cheelda, pakodi, gur-papda etc. are cooked. But the craze for kite-flying prevalent in the cities on this occasion is, however, virtually non-existent in the villages.

==== Gangaur ====
The last of the village festivals in a calendar year; the 21st day of Chaitra month; spring season at the end of its full bloom, aura of smell and greenery; festive atmosphere at the time of equinox; villagers in leisure; the occasion is festival of Gangaur, predominantly a function of females like 'Teej'. Literally "gangaur" means goddess Parvati mother of 9 'Gans' (nine basic traits of human conscience-owned by lord ganesha son of parvati).

According to mythology, Parvati had worshiped lord Shiva to have him her husband. Therefore, all the aspirant brides worship goddess mother Parvati praying for providing them with husband of their choice. Some 15 days ahead of the festival, each day early in the morning the girls go to outskirts of the village, collect green branches of the local bush 'Fog' full of smell with its flower 'Ghintal'( by the way ' the smell of the 'ghital' of the then densely found bush in the desert areas in the month of 'Chaitra-maas' used to be all pervasive making the surroundings lively and festive. but, alas!, with fast disappearing of the bush it is no more there!); offer water to the branches and worship Parvati.

On the day of the festival in the evening, competitions of wrestling, kabadi, horse and camel race are organised. The youths of the village participate enthusiastically. The idols of the Gaur are thrown in the village well to get them submerged in the fresh water of the well. A legend also goes that a Rajput lady Gangaur while at her parental home jumped in the village well followed by her husband Hada and therefore since then the festival is observed. But it might have been added during feudal period just to give the festival a touch of the authority of the ruling class. The special diet on the occasion is 'Dhokla'(berry like pieces of the dough of millet cooked in the steam of water) along with 'Kheer'. The girl who worshiped 'Gangaur' is considered duty bound to do 'Gaur-ujna' after her marriage as an offering for fulfilment of her prayers before marriage.

=== Music and entertainment ===
Folk songs are sung by women during weddings and on other social occasions. Menfolk sing dhamaal ( traditional Holi songs). Many villagers own TV's as well as radios and satellite dishes. The sound of popular Hindi music emanating from stereos and other devices is heard from different houses during the afternoon and evening.

=== Games and sports ===
Nowadays most of the children play cricket. Some villagers also play volleyball and football. Villagers can be seen playing cards in chaupal (village common area) and "chausar" (choppad-pasa) in some houses. Some of the traditional games & sports are also prevalent.

- Folk games :
  - 'Kabadi'(played between two teams, each team having seven players, one team operates as raiders and the other catchers, if the raider is caught he is out but if he manages to over power the catchers and comes to the central line, all the catchers touching him are out.
  - 'Ghoda- kabadi (a variation of kabadi) is also popular.
  - 'Peewani'(a variation of hockey, played at night during 'holi- dipawali' days).
  - 'Hardada'(a variation of cricket, played during 'Holi' days.
  - 'Guntha'(a variation of golf)
  - 'Dharsunda'(seven players in a ring and seven outside it, each of the outside players raids the ring and tries to throw out as many opponents as possible but the opponents are free to hit/catch/fell him and if he is unable to come out of the ring he is out).
  - 'Lala-liter'(players sit in a circle, one of them with a concealed shoe with him and chanting 'Lala- liter 'lewun ke dewun' takes round of them and puts stealthily the shoe behind any of them, if the person realises it he can beat the raider with the shoe otherwise he is beaten with the shoe and given out to function as next raider).

The games were played by children/ youths either at night or during slack season; apart from providing recreation, they also provided an opportunity to prove one's superiority, make friends, and be trained for teamwork. But now they are on the wane.
