= Beniwal =

Jat clan in Northern India

Regions with significant populations
- Rajasthan, Haryana, Uttar Pradesh, Madhya Pradesh, Maharashtra

Languages
- Hindi

Religion
- Hinduism

Related ethnic groups
- Jat, Godara, Jani

Beniwal is an Indian Jat gotra, mainly found in the Indian states of Rajasthan, Haryana, Uttar Pradesh, Madhya Pradesh, Maharashtra, etc. Beniwal is one of the most populated gotra under Jat clan. During the 16th century, due to their prolonged conflict with the Rathores of Rajasthan, they earned the title of warriors.

== Origin ==
Beniwal Gotra is derived from Bani (Jungle). These people are Nagavanshi Jats. They are supposed to be descendants of Vena, the progenitor of Prithu (incarnation of Vishnu), known as the first ruler of the world who was consecrated.

== History ==
Originally from Central Asia, they moved to the northern Salt Range in the Punjab region of India. When Alexander the Great invaded Punjab in 326 B.C., they fought alongside him. Later, Beniwal moved to the Jangladesh region of north Rajasthan, which is known as Rajasthan, together with Sihag, Punia, Godara, Saran, and Johiya, and ruled there until the 15th century. Raisal Beniwal established Raslana as the Beniwal's capital in Jangladesh.

== Notable persons ==
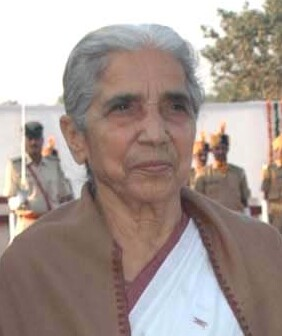
Kamla Beniwal, former deputy chief minister of Rajasthan

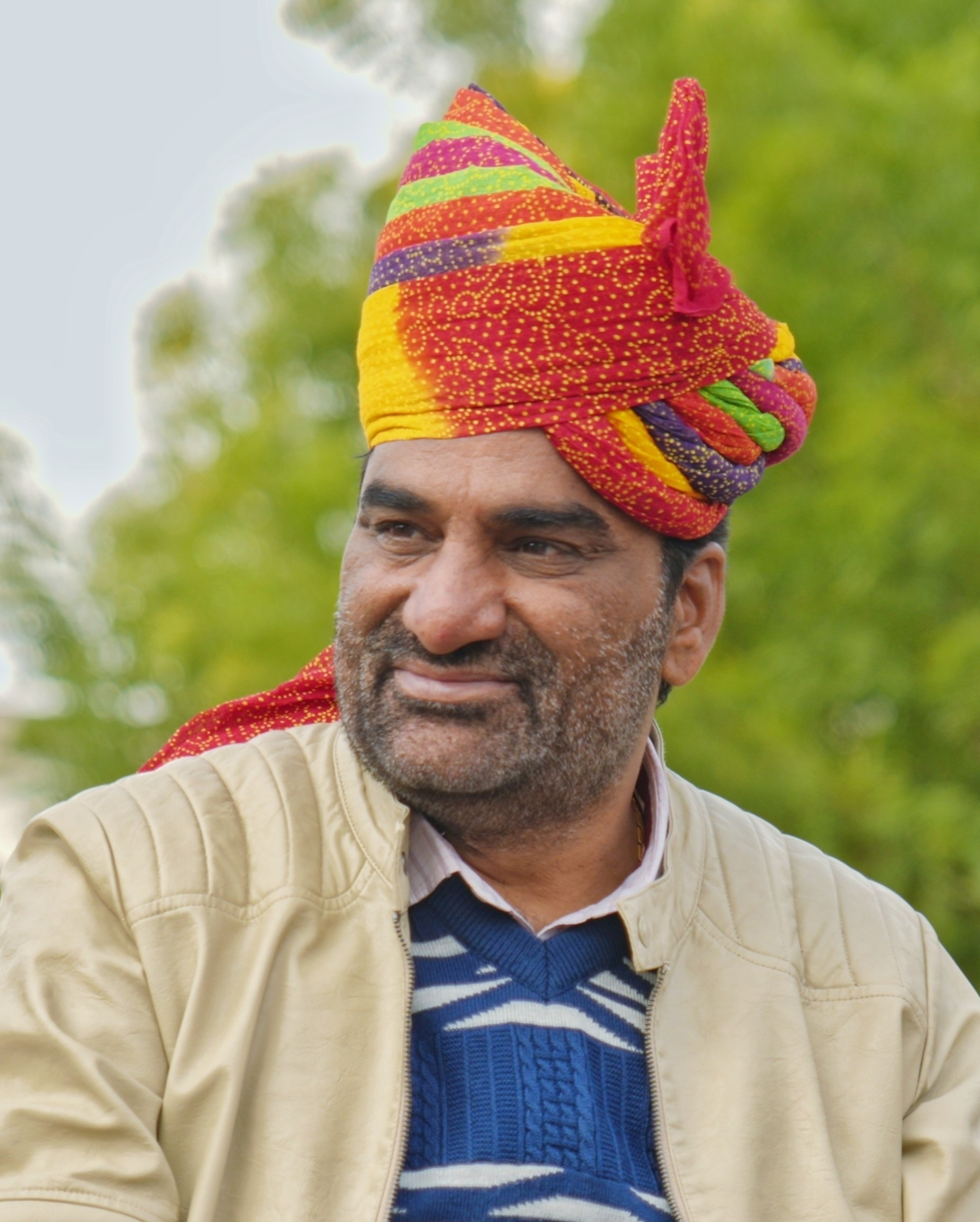
Hanuman Beniwal, founder of the Rashtriya Loktantrik Party

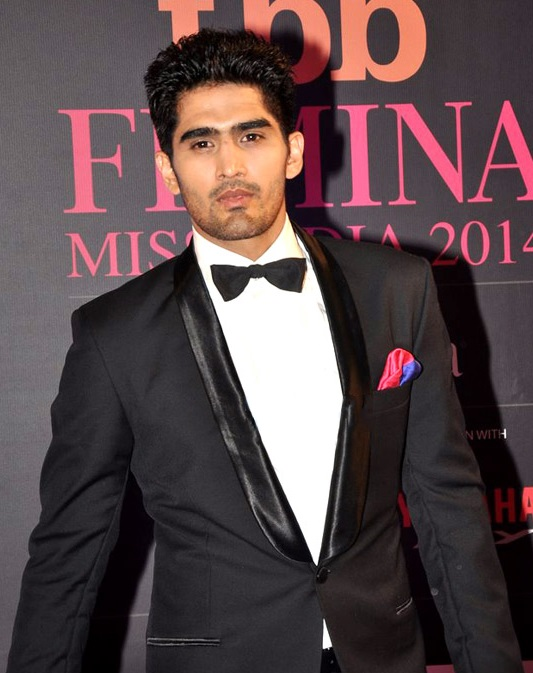
Vijender Singh, Indian professional boxer

- Amrita Devi Beniwal, martyr at Khejarli massacre
- Bharat Singh Beniwal, Indian politician
- Chaudhary Laxmi Narayan Singh, Indian politician
- Hanuman Beniwal, Indian politician
- Kamla Beniwal, Indian politician
- Mohit Beniwal, Indian politician
- Narayan Beniwal, Indian politician
- Puneet Beniwal, Indian actor
- Sanjeev Beniwal, Indian politician
- Ummeda Ram Beniwal, Indian politician
- Vidya Beniwal, Indian politician
- Vijender Beniwal, Indian boxer
- Harsh Beniwal, Indian Internet Personality
- Paramvir Beniwal, Indian Internet personality

== Political family ==
=== Beniwal Family of Rajasthan ===
On 29 October 2018, Hanuman Beniwal founded the Rashtriya Loktantrik Party, becoming its national convenor in the process. This made Beniwal family as one of the most influential political families of Rajasthan since Rashtriya Loktantrik Party (RLP) is the only successful party in the state besides Indian National Congress and Bhartiya Janta Party.

- Hanuman Beniwal, Member of Lok Sabha from Nagaur, former two term Member of Rajasthan Legislative Assembly from Khinvsar, founder and National Convenor of the Rashtriya Loktantrik Party.
- Narayan Beniwal, Member of Rajasthan Legislative Assembly from Khinvsar, Nagaur, Rajasthan.
