= Chandeni =

- village
- Nickname: Jhojhu-Chandaani
- Location in Haryana, India Chandeni (India)
- Coordinates: 28.474605°N 76.125264°E
- Country: India
- State: Haryana
- District: Charkhi Dadri
- Elevation: 225 m (738 ft)

Languages
  - Official: Haryanvi, Hindi
- Time zone: UTC+5:30 (IST)
- PIN: 127310
- ISO 3166 code: IN-HR
- Vehicle registration: 19
- Website: haryana.gov.in

Chandeni is a village in the Charkhi Dadri district of the Indian state of Haryana. Charkhi Dadri itself used to be a tehsil within Bhiwani district, which was subsequently split in 2016, giving Charkhi Dadri a district status.

For political representational purposes the village is part of Bhadra Assembly constituency and the Bhiwani-Mahendragarh Lok Sabha constituency. Neighbouring villages include Rudrol, Mai, Gokal, Ramalwas and Badhwana.

== Establishment ==
According to Jagga's record book at Gadhganga, Chandeni was established in 1860s by a migrant from Jhojhu Kalan, Dada Kusahla and named it after his wife, Chandni. Dada Kusahala was a 12th generation descendant of Dada Sangu (whose name may have been adopted in surname Sangwan). Hence the majority population in this village has the Sangwan surname.

Later in 1910s, Chanda Kaur, sister of Dada Kusahala, migrated from her in-laws village Bamla due to some family disputes. Since, she was married in a Grewal family, certain Grewal population also grew here along with Sangwans.

== Geography ==
Chandeni falls under Badhra tehsil of Charkhi Dadri district. It is 3 kilometres (1.9 mi) off the main highway from Badhwana at Dadri-Narnaul road, The district headquarters, Charkhi Dadri, The tehsil centre, Badhra, and the semi-urbanised area Jhojhu are at a distance of about 50, 15 and 5 km respectively. The land is semi-arid with weather being extremely hot in summers and cold in winters.

There is a small hillock on the southern outskirts of Chandeni. A defunct canal passes through the village in North-South direction. The road transport to district headquarter in Charkhi dadri may be taken either through Badhwana via Bijna & Java, or through Jhojhu via Ramalwas & Kaliana. A temple on West of the village, Sadhana, is considered sacrosanct by the locals.

== Demography ==
As of the 2011 Census of India, the village had 551 households with a total population of 2,635 of which 1,365 were male and 1,270 female.

Most of the people here are from the Jat community. Due to large number of Sangwan people residing in nearby area, the major portion of the population has become Sangwans. About 90% of people here are Sangwan and Ahlawat and 10% homes belong to Grewal. Most of the people do not live in the mainland of village, but on the outskirts and the cultivated land of the village. This brings a decline in the population of Chandeni.

== Occupation ==
A majority of people here belong to ancestral farming. But they also exhibit a special attachment towards the Indian Armed Forces. Most of the male population of the village are either serving or retired Army Personnel at some point of time in their life.Indian Army/Para Military/ Delhi Police/ Haryana police/ NSG/ Civil Services

== Agriculture ==
There is an acute ground level water shortage due to the weather conditions. The main method of irrigation is underground, non-submersible water pumps. Wells are dug to a depth of around 200 feet (61 m) and then bored deeper in order to reach the water level. The potors are kept at the bottom of such dry wells reaching the water level through pipes. The major crops of this area are millet, wheat, sorghum, chickpea, mustard, cotton and bajra.
