= Jats =

Social group of India and Pakistan

Total population
- ~33 million (2009 estimation)

Regions with significant populations
- Pakistan: ~21 million (2009 estimation)
- India: ~12 million (2009 estimation)

Languages
- Braj • Hindi • Haryanvi • Khariboli • Punjabi (and its dialects) • Rajasthani • Sindhi (and its dialects) • Urdu

Religion
- Hinduism (47%) • Islam (33%) • Sikhism (20%)

The Jats, (Note: Hindi: [dʒaːʈ], Punjabi: [dʒəʈː]) also spelt Jaats and Jatts, are a traditionally agricultural caste and community in northern India and Pakistan. (Note: "Glossary: Jat: title of north India's major non-elite 'peasant' caste.") (Note: "... in the middle decades of the (nineteenth) century, there were two contrasting trends in India's agrarian regions. Previously marginal areas took off as zones of newly profitable 'peasant' agriculture, disadvantaging non-elite tilling groups, who were known by such titles as Jat in western NWP and Gounder in Coimatore.") (Note: "In the later nineteenth century, this thinking led colonial officials to try to protect Sikh Jats and other non-elite 'peasants' whom they now favoured as military recruits by advocating legislation under the so-called land alienation.") Originally nomadic pastoralists in the lower Indus River Valley of Sindh and Makran, many Jats migrated north into the Punjab region, and subsequently into Delhi, northeastern Rajasthan, and the western Gangetic Plain, at the turn of second millennium CE. Of Hindu, Muslim and Sikh faiths, today they mainly inhabit the Pakistani regions of Sindh, Punjab and Azad Kashmir and the Indian states of Punjab, Haryana, Uttar Pradesh and Rajasthan.

By the 20th century, the landowning Jats became an influential group in several parts of North India, including Punjab, Western Uttar Pradesh, Rajasthan, Haryana and Delhi. Over the years, several Jats abandoned agriculture in favour of urban jobs, and used their dominant economic and political status to claim higher social status.

== Origin and etymology ==
The Indo-Aryan term Jat (and its female form, Jatni) descends from the Prakrit form Jaṭṭa, itself from Jarta or Jartika, the name of an ancient non-Vedic Bahlika tribe. The first mention of Jats is in an inscription found in modern Gilgit-Baltistan, dated to the 6th or 7th century, which records some Jats as having passed through the area.

Historically, the term 'Jat' was loosely applied to various tribes, especially in West Punjab and Sindh. In Sindh, the romanised term 'Jat' could be used as a transliteration for Jat, or to refer to a member of the "Jath" community. It is also sometimes used pejoratively to refer to a peasant. In Punjab, especially from the Mughal era onwards, the term "Jat" was also used more as a socioeconomic status than an ethnic label, and they were often associated with the peasantry.

The Arabic term Zuṭṭ is derived from Jat, and was used for the Jats then living in Arab Sind and Makran, although sometimes other tribes such as Sayabijas were also considered a part of them. The term Jadgal (lit. 'Jaṭṭ-speakers') is also derived from Jat, and was used by the Baloch to refer to the Indic tribes living amongst them.

== History ==
The term 'Jat' covers a wide-ranging community in the Indian subcontinent from simple landowning peasants (Note: According to Susan Bayly, "... (North India) contained large numbers of non-elite tillers. In the Punjab and the western Gangetic Plains, convention defined the Rajput's non-elite counterpart as a Jat. Like many similar titles used elsewhere, this was not so much a caste name as a broad designation for the man of substance in rural terrain. ... To be called Jat has in some regions implied a background of pastoralism, though it has more commonly been a designation of non-servile cultivating people.") to wealthy and influential zamindars. The Jats had their origins in pastoralism in the lower Indus valley, and gradually became agriculturalist farmers.

At the time of Muhammad ibn al-Qasim's conquest of Sind in the 8th century, Arab writers described agglomerations of Jats, known to them as Zuṭṭ, in the arid, the wet, and the mountainous regions of the conquered land of Sindh. The Jats were one of the first communities in the Indian subcontinent to interact with the Muslims. They were known to the Arabs as the Zuṭṭ, although sometimes a few other tribes living in their vicinity were also considered a part of them. The Arab conquerors noted several important concentrations of Jats in the towns and fortresses across central and lower Sind. Several medieval Muslim chronicles such as the Chachnama, Tarikh-i Bayhaqi and Zainul-Akhbar record battles between Jats and forces of Muhammad ibn al-Qasim. At the Battle of Aror, the eastern Jats fought against Muhammad ibn al-Qasim in the forces of Dahir of Aror. The Arab rulers, though professing a theologically egalitarian religion, maintained the position of Jats and the discriminatory practices against them that had been put in place in the long period of Hindu rule in Sind.

Between the eleventh and the sixteenth centuries, Jat herders in the Sind migrated up along the river valleys into the upper Punjab doabs which may have been largely uncultivated in the first millennium. Many took up tilling in regions such as western Punjab, where the sakia (water wheel) had been recently introduced. Around 1595, Jat zamindars controlled a little over 32% of the zamindaris in the Punjab region. By the 18th and 19th centuries, in the Punjab, Jat had become general term for 'peasant' in Punjab, and some Jats had come to own land and exert local influence. Over time the Jats became primarily Muslim in the western Punjab, Sikh in the eastern Punjab, and Hindu in the areas between Delhi Territory and Agra, with the divisions by faith reflecting the geographical strengths of these religions.

Starting in the 10th century, some Jat clans established chieftaincies in the historical Jangladesh region, with the most powerful among them being the Poonias, Godaras, Sarans, Sihags, Beniwals, Kaswans and Sahus; the Johiyas are also included by James Tod, though they are also sometimes identified as a branch of the Yadu-Bhati Rajputs rather than a distinct Jat clan. In the 15th century, the Rathore Rajputs exploited the rivalry between the clans and conquered the region, establishing the Bikaner State. The Jat chiefs were forced to recognise the suzerainty of the Rathores, although some, particularly the Godara Jats who had previously allied with the forces of Rao Bika, were given certain privileges under the Bikaner realm. In 1505, the Bamraulia Jats migrated and settled in the trans-Chambal tract, laying the foundations for the Kingdom of Gohad. The Jats of Gohad briefly captured and held the Gwalior fort, before losing it to the Marathas. In 1805, the last ruler of Gohad, Rana Kirat Singh, as part of an arrangement made with the British East India Company, established the Dholpur State.

During the heyday of Mughal rule, Jats had recognised rights. A notable Jat family of Mughal period was that of Sa'adullah Khan, a grand vizier, and his descendants. According to Barbara D. Metcalf and Thomas R. Metcalf:

Upstart warriors, Marathas, Jats, and the like, as coherent social groups with military and governing ideals, were themselves a product of the Mughal context, which recognised them and provided them with military and governing experience. Their successes were a part of the Mughal success.

From the 1660s to the 1690s, the Hindu Jats of the Ganges-Yamuna Doab were in rebellion against the Mughal Empire. In 1669, the Hindu Jats, under the leadership of Gokula, rebelled against the Mughal emperor Aurangzeb in Mathura. The community came to predominate south and east of Delhi after 1710.

During the decline of the Mughal Empire in the early 18th century, the non-elite tillers and pastoralists, such as the Jats or Ahirs, were part of a social spectrum that blended only indistinctly into the elite landowning classes at one end, and the menial or ritually polluting classes at the other. As the Mughal Empire faltered, there were a series of rural rebellions in North India. Although these had sometimes been characterised as "peasant rebellions", others, such as Muzaffar Alam, have pointed out that small local landholders, or zemindars, often led these uprisings. The Sikh and Jat rebellions were led by such small local zemindars, who had close association and family connections with each other and with the peasants under them, and who were often armed. According to historian Christopher Bayly:

Men characterised by early eighteenth century Mughal records as plunderers and bandits preying on the imperial lines of communications had by the end of the century spawned a range of petty states linked by marriage alliance and religious practice.

These communities of rising peasant-warriors were not well-established Indian castes, but rather quite new, without fixed status categories, and with the ability to absorb older peasant castes, sundry warlords, and nomadic groups on the fringes of settled agriculture. The Mughal Empire, even at the zenith of its power, functioned by devolving authority and never had direct control over its rural grandees. It was these zemindars who gained most from these rebellions, increasing the land under their control.

After the decline of the Mughals, various groups fought to fill the power vacuum, including some ambitious Muslim Jat chiefs and princes, such as the Chattha chiefs in Punjab, and Ali Mohammed Khan and his successors, the Nawabs of Rampur. The triumphant even attained the ranks of minor princes, such as the Jat ruler Badan Singh of the princely state of Bharatpur. By the mid-eighteenth century, the ruler of the recently established Jat kingdom of Bharatpur, Raja Surajmal, felt sanguine enough about durability to build a garden palace at nearby Deeg. According to historian, Eric Stokes:

When the power of the Bharatpur raja was riding high, fighting clans of Jats encroached into the Karnal/Panipat, Mathura, Agra, and Aligarh districts, usually at the expense of Rajput groups. But such a political umbrella was too fragile and short-lived for substantial displacement to be effected.

The Jat community played an important role in the development of the martial Khalsa panth of Sikhism. At least nine of the twelve Misls of the Sikh Confederacy were led by Jat Sikhs, who constituted the majority of the Sikh chiefs. They also played important roles in the remaining three Misls. The Sikh Empire, which ultimately unified the Misls under a single rule, was founded by the Sikh Jat Maharaja Ranjit Singh.

The princely states of Patiala, Faridkot, Jind, and Nabha were ruled by the Sikh Jat Phulkian dynasty.

== Demographics ==
=== India ===
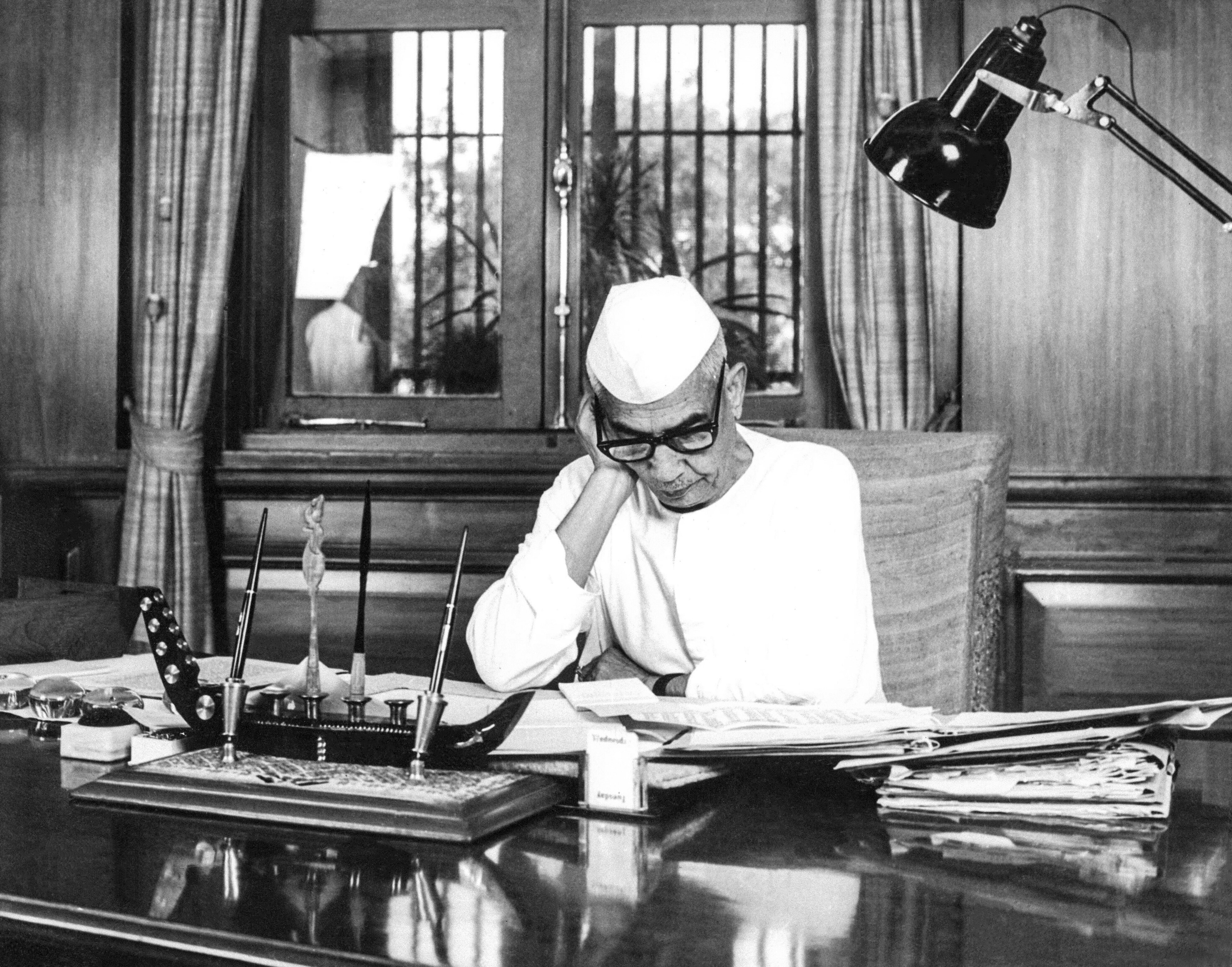
Charan Singh, the first and only prime minister of India from the Jat caste

In India, multiple 21st-century estimates put Jat's population share at 20–25% in Haryana state and at 20–35% in Punjab state. In Rajasthan, Delhi, and Uttar Pradesh, they constitute around 9%, 5%, and 1.2% respectively of the total population.

In the 20th century and more recently, Jats have dominated as the political class in Haryana and Punjab. Jat people also became notable political leaders, including the fifth prime minister of India, Charan Singh, from Uttar Pradesh, the sixth deputy prime minister of India, Devi Lal, from Haryana, and former vice-president of India, Jagdeep Dhankar, from Rajasthan.

==== Affirmative action ====
Consolidation of economic gains and participation in the electoral process are two visible outcomes of the post-independence situation. Through this participation they have been able to significantly influence the politics of North India. Economic differentiation, migration and mobility could be clearly noticed among the Jat people.

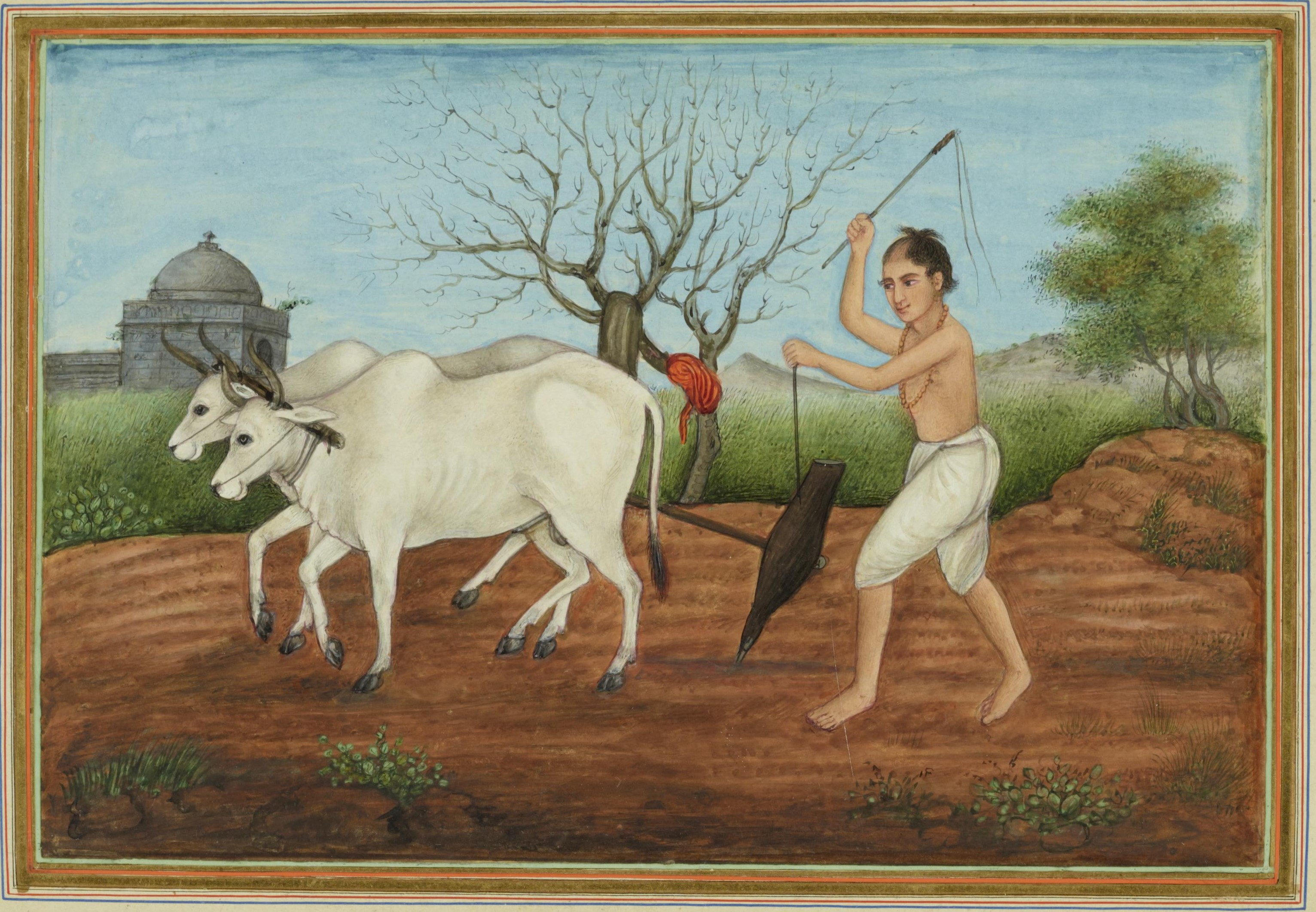
Early 19th-century painting of a Jat farmer

The Jats are classified as General caste (forward caste) in almost all states of India. Jats from seven of India's thirty-six states and UTs, namely Rajasthan, Himachal Pradesh, Delhi, Uttarakhand, Uttar Pradesh, Madhya Pradesh, and Chhattisgarh, are included in their respective state OBC lists. However, only the Jats of Rajasthan – excluding those of Bharatpur district, Deeg district and Dholpur district – are entitled to reservation in central government jobs under the OBC reservation. In 2016, Haryana's Jats organised massive protests demanding OBC classification for affirmative action benefits.

=== Pakistan ===
Many Jat Muslim people live in Pakistan and have dominant roles in public life in the Pakistani Punjab and Pakistan in general. Jat communities also exist in Pakistani-administered Kashmir, in Sindh, particularly the Indus delta and among Seraiki-speaking communities in southern Pakistani Punjab, the Kachhi region of Balochistan and the Dera Ismail Khan District of the North West Frontier Province.

In Pakistan also, Jat people have become notable political leaders, like Hina Rabbani Khar.

=== Estimations ===
According to anthropologist Sunil K. Khanna, the Jat population in South Asia was estimated to be around 30 million (or 3 crore) in 2010. His estimation is based on the statistics of the last caste census conducted in 1931, which had placed the Jat population at about 8 million (or 80 lakh), mostly concentrated in India and Pakistan, and on the subsequent population growth of the region.

Similarly, Deryck O. Lodrick estimated the Jat population to be over 33 million (or 3.3 crore) in South Asia in 2009—approximately 12 million in India and over 21 million in Pakistan. His calculation was based on population projections from the late 1980s and the growth trends of both countries. Lodrick also noted the lack of precise statistical data and mentioned that some estimates placed their total population at around 43 million in South Asia in 2009.

== Religion ==
According to historians Catherine Asher and Cynthia Talbot,

The Jats also provide an important insight into how religious identities evolved during the precolonial era. Before they settled in the Punjab and other northern regions, the pastoralist Jats had little exposure to any of the mainstream religions. Only after they became more integrated into the agrarian world did the Jats adopt the dominant religion of the people in whose midst they dwelt.

Jats practise several religions, primarily Hinduism, Sikhism, and Islam. In India, large numbers of Jats are Hindu, concentrated in Rajasthan, Haryana, Uttar Pradesh, and Madhya Pradesh. Hindu Jats also pray to their dead ancestors, a practice which is called Jathera. Sikh Jats forms a significant portion of the Sikh population in Punjab, and some scholars have linked Sikh military traditions to the community's agrarian and martial background. In Pakistan, most Jats are Muslim.

Deryck O. Lodrick estimates religion-wise break-up of Jats as follows: 47% Hindus, 33% Muslims, and 20% Sikhs.

In the Province of Punjab, as per a 1921 census held in British India, 47% were Muslims, 33% were Sikhs and 19% were Hindus. The former Punjab Province of British India extended well beyond the borders of present-day Punjab in both Pakistan and India, encompassing regions that are now part of Haryana, Himachal Pradesh, Delhi, Chandigarh, and parts of Jammu and Kashmir, in addition to today's Punjab provinces.

=== Hindu Jats ===
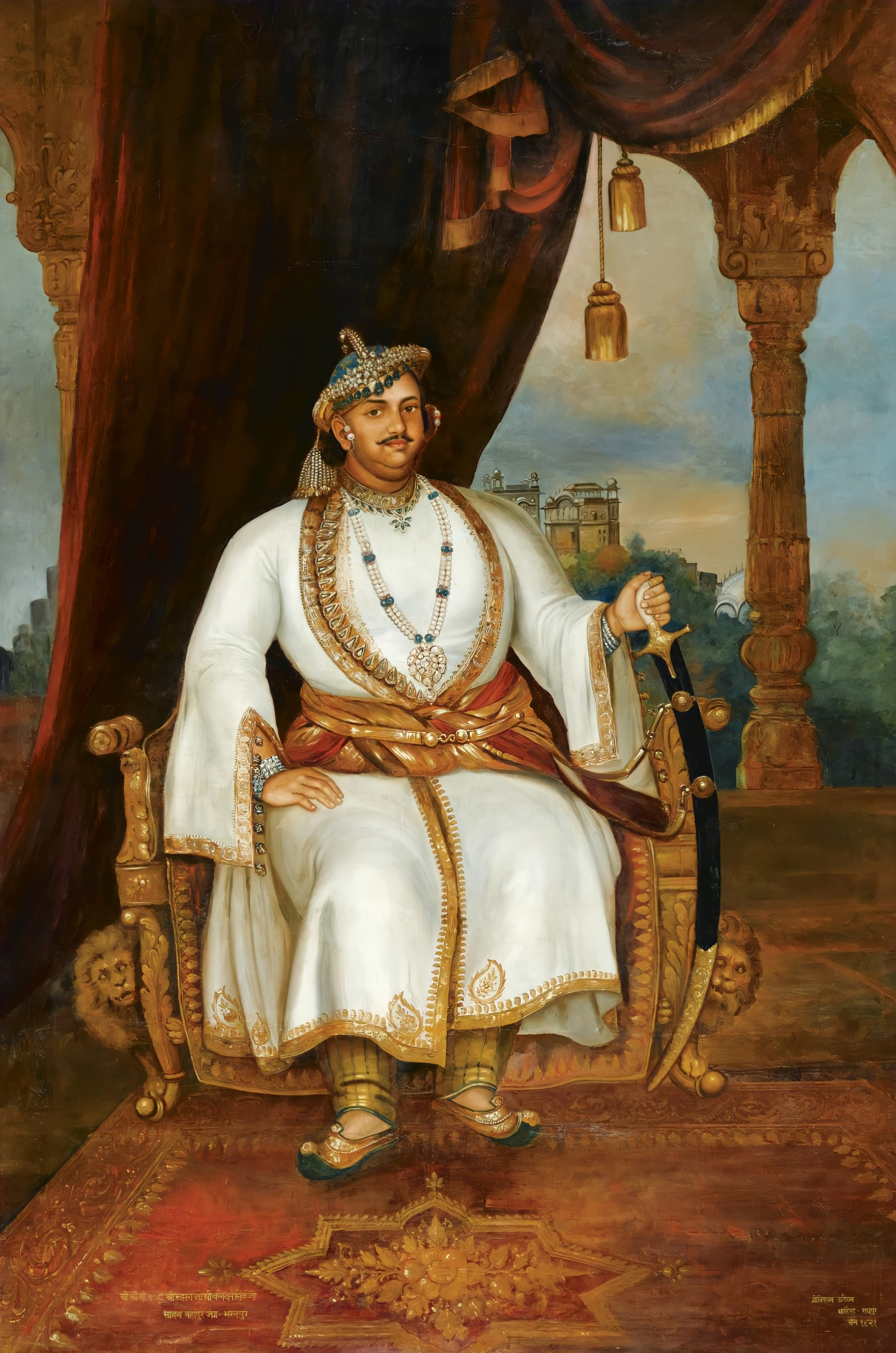
The Hindu Jat Maharaja of Bharatpur, Balwant Singh

Jats had moved into the Gangetic Plain in two large migrations, in the seventeenth and eighteenth centuries respectively. They were not a caste in the usual Hindu sense, for example, in which Bhumihars of the eastern Gangetic plain were; rather they were an umbrella group of peasant-warriors. According to Christopher Bayly:

This was a society where Brahmins were few and male Jats married into the whole range of lower agricultural and entrepreneurial castes. A kind of tribal nationalism animated them rather than a nice calculation of caste differences expressed within the context of Brahminical Hindu state.

Leading up to the partition of India, Hindu Jats, alongside other Hindu castes, would take up arms and organise into Dhars, aiming to eliminate Muslim influence in the Mewat region. The forces of nearby Hindu princely states, including the Hindu Jat-ruled Bharatpur State, would support rioting Hindus in expelling the Meos and other regional Muslims. After the partition, Hindu Jats continued to play a dominant role in the politics of Haryana.

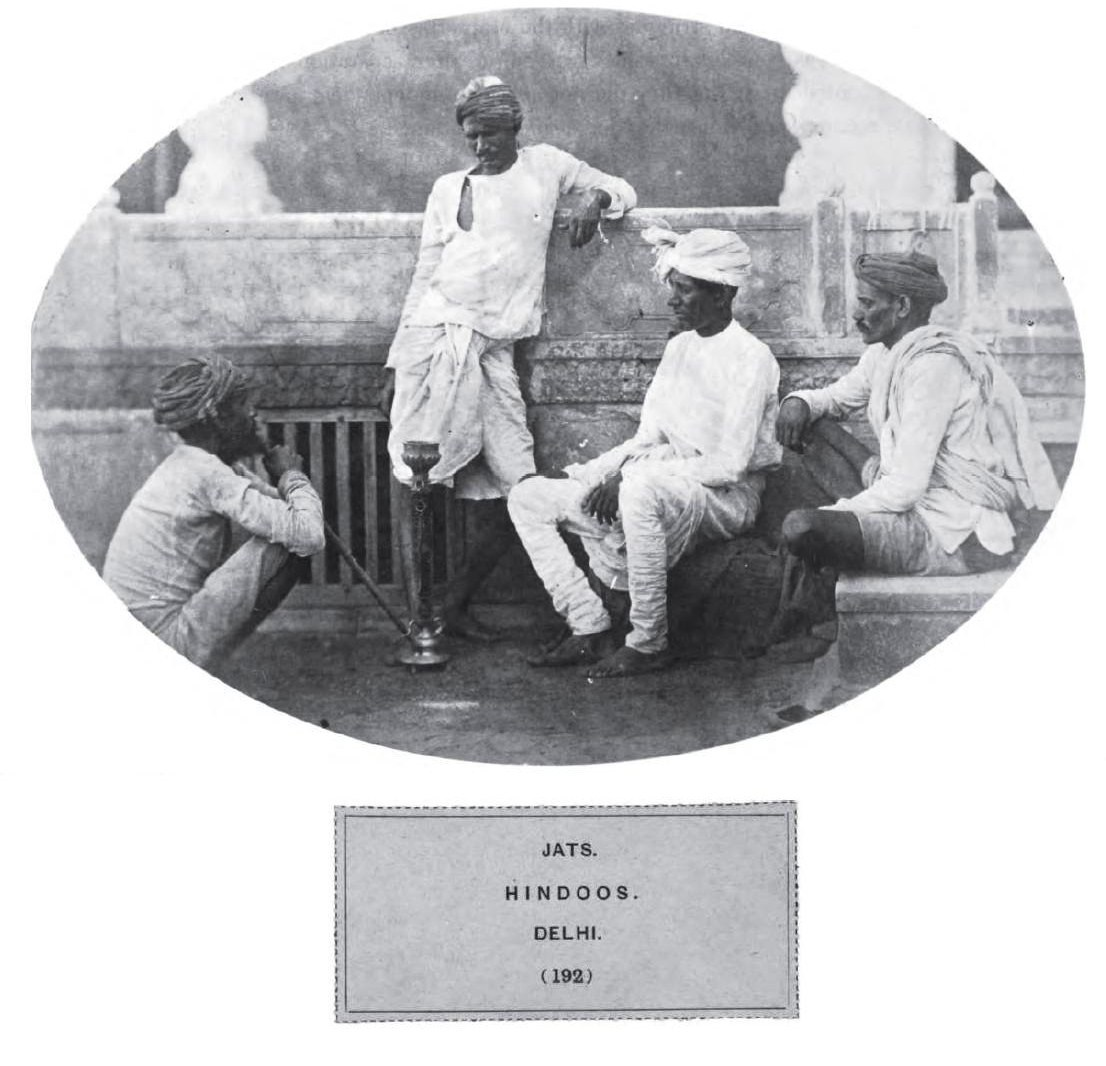
Jats in the Delhi Territory in 1868

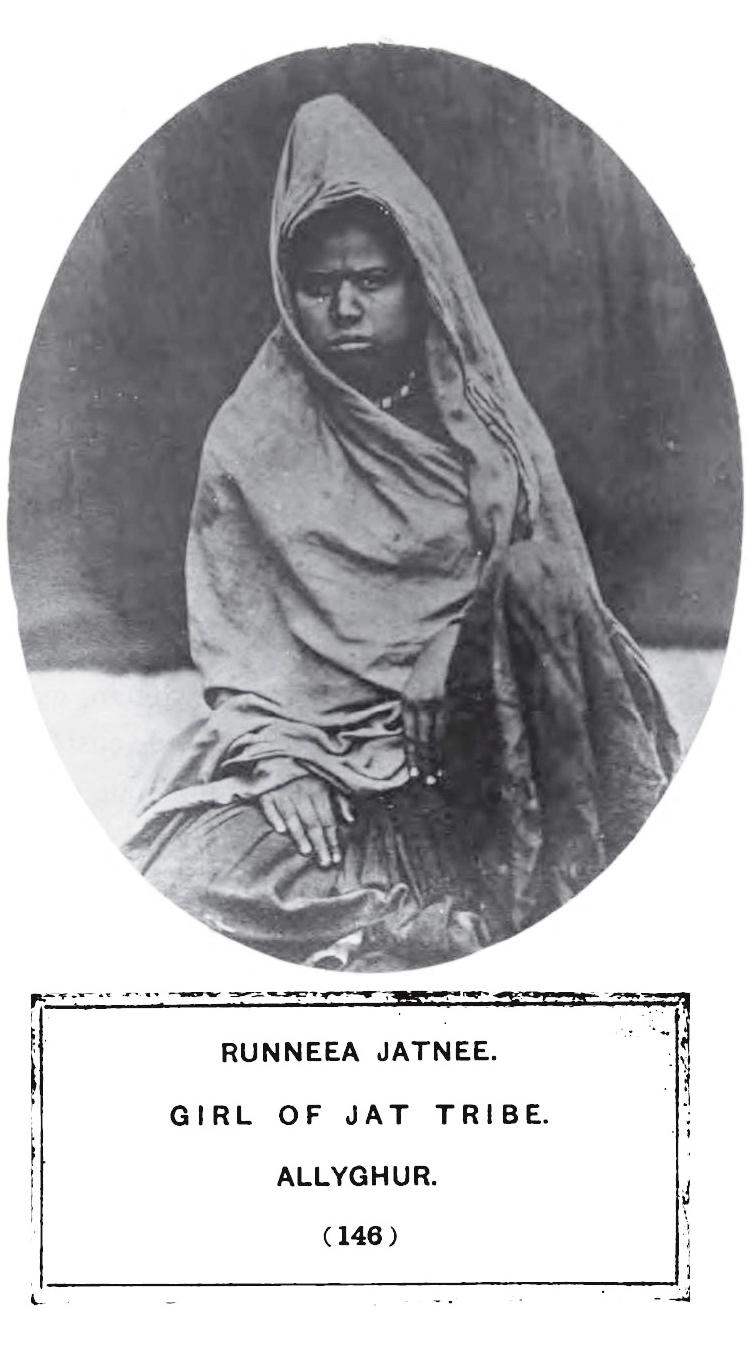
Jat girl from Aligarh, Uttar Pradesh, India, 1868

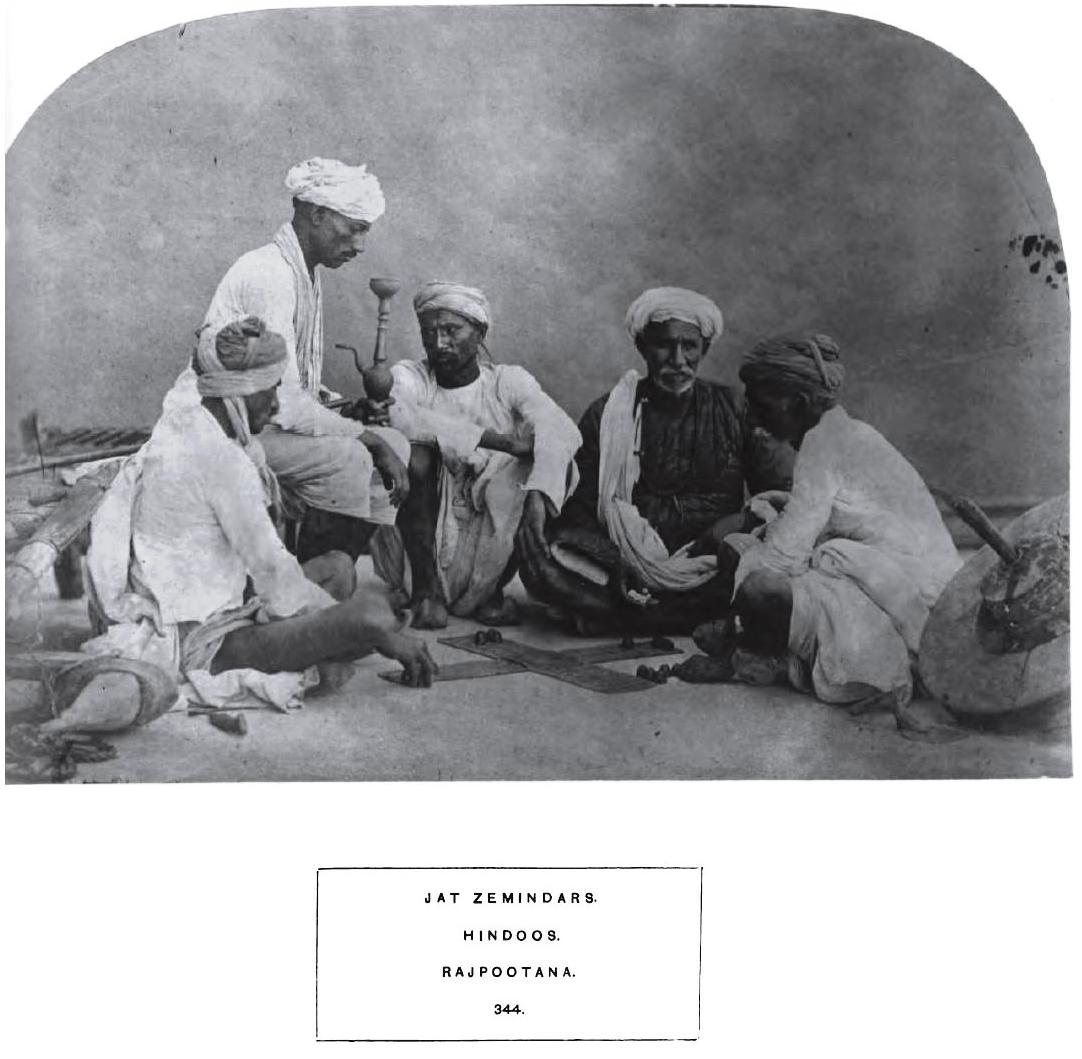
Ethnographic photograph of Jat zemindars (land owners) in Rajasthan, playing pachisi, 1874

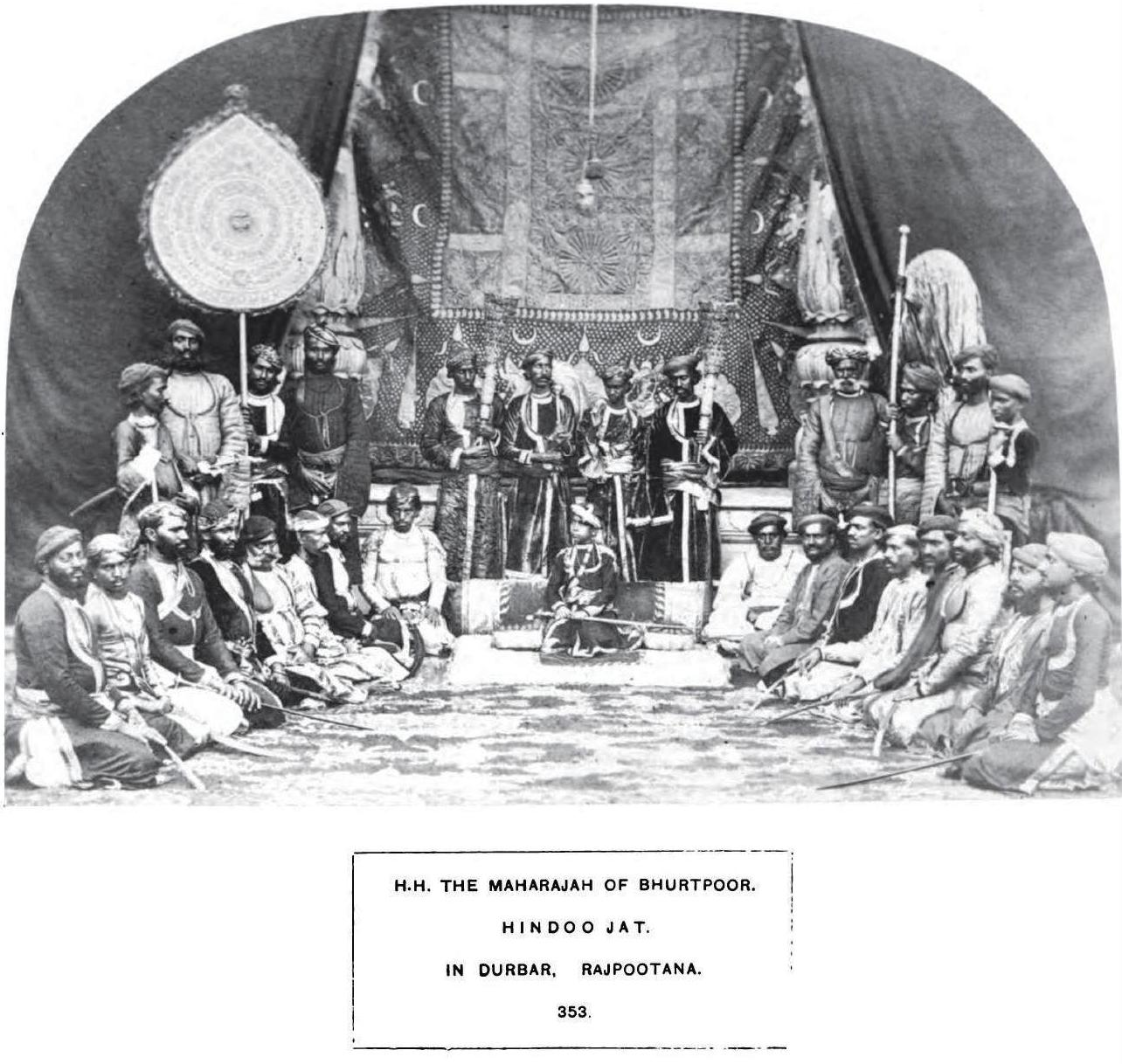
The durbar of the teenage Hindu Jat ruler of Bharatpur, a princely state in Rajasthan, early 1860s

=== Muslim Jats ===
Several clans have traditions of converting to Islam during the first half of 2nd millennium CE, claiming to be influenced by Sufi saints. The conversion process was gradual. André Wink writes:

And in the Panjab as well, many of the Jats now, in the later thirteenth century, while being turned into peasants, began to convert to Islam on a more extended scale. The vast majority of the Jat and Rajput groups of the Panjab that became Muslim in medieval times claims to have been converted either by Sheikh Farid ad-Din Ganj-i-Shakar... or by his contemporary Baha' al-Haqq Zakariya... probably it was not Baba Farid himself but his shrine which served as the agent of these clans' conversions, giving them access to Islam and making them participants in the Sultanate without being directly subservient to Delhi.

By the 16th century, many of the Punjabi clans west of the Ravi River had converted to Islam. When the British left and South Asia was partitioned, many Muslim Jats migrated to the newly formed Pakistan. However, some remained in India, where they are known as Muley Jats.

=== Sikh Jats ===
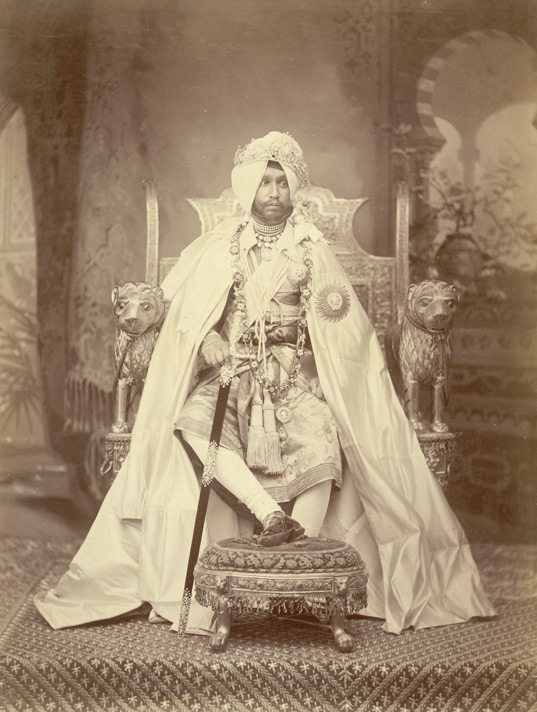
The Sikh Jat Maharaja of Patiala, 1898

While followers important to Sikh tradition like Baba Buddha were among the earliest significant historical Sikh figures, and significant numbers of conversions occurred as early as the time of Guru Angad (1504–1552), the first large-scale conversions of Jats is commonly held to have begun during the time of Guru Arjan (1563–1606). While touring the countryside of eastern Punjab, he founded several important towns like Tarn Taran Sahib, Kartarpur, and Hargobindpur which functioned as social and economic hubs, and together with the community-funded completion of the Darbar Sahib to house the Guru Granth Sahib and serve as a rallying point and centre for Sikh activity, established the beginnings of a self-contained Sikh community, which was especially swelled with the region's Jat peasantry.

They formed the vanguard of Sikh resistance against the Mughal Empire from the 18th century onwards. It has been postulated, though inconclusively, that the increased militarisation of the Sikh panth following the martyrdom of Guru Arjan (beginning during the era of Guru Hargobind and continuing after) and its large Jat presence may have reciprocally influenced each other.

According to censuses in gazetteers published during the colonial period in the early 20th century, further waves of Jat conversions, from Hinduism to Sikhism, continued during the preceding decades. Writing about the Jats of Punjab, the Sikh author Khushwant Singh opined that their attitude never allowed themselves to be absorbed in the Brahminic fold. The British played a significant role in the rise of Sikh Jat population by encouraging Hindu Jats to convert to Sikhism so as to get larger number of Sikh recruits for their army.

Leading up to the partition of India, Sikh Jats, alongside other Sikh groups, would take up arms and organise into Jathas, aiming to eliminate Muslim influence in east Punjab. These militias were well-organised, armed and supported by Sikh Jat princes, especially the Maharaja of Patiala. After the partition, Sikh Jats continued to play a dominant role in the politics of Indian Punjab. The ongoing Khalistan movement is also sometimes seen as an attempt to form a Sikh "Jatistan".

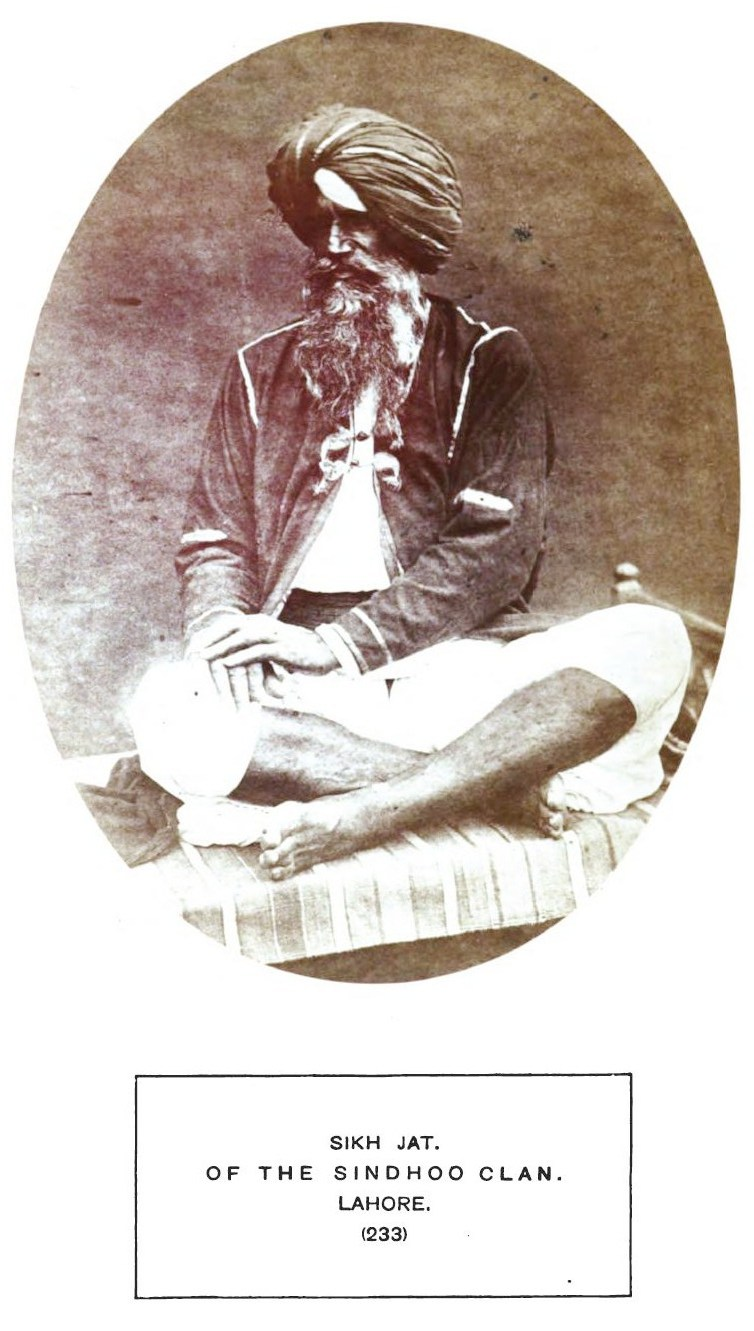
Jat Sikh of the "Sindhoo" clan, Lahore, 1872

== Culture and society ==
=== Women in Jat society ===
Historically, Jat women were expected to abide by the rules of their Khap, which governed much of the social life of Jat society. In the modern day, many of these Khaps have come under scrutiny for their male-centric structure and rules. However, many Khap leaders now promote social progress in Jat society, such as supporting girls' education.

In some cases, Jat women were recorded to be observing purdah. The Bamraulia Jat chief of Gohad State reportedly identified as Kshatriya, and consequently considered it a duty for his women to observe purdah.

During the colonial period, the Hindu Jats were one of the many communities which were practicing female infanticide. As a result, there was a sex-ratio imbalance between women and men. This imbalance left some Jats to resort to purchasing brides from neighboring (including non-Jat) communities, or adopting adelphic polyandry and having multiple brothers share one wife. This was typically done by poor men who sought to preserve what little was left of their family's land holdings. Both bride purchasing and adelphic polyandry is still practised by some Jats in Indian Punjab and Haryana.

=== The Khap System ===
The Khap system was historically the prevailing system of organisation among the Jat community. The system continues to exist today, but as an extrajudicial organisation not legally recognised by the Government of India. However, Khaps continue to hold significant social influence in Jat-dominated areas, policing marriage customs and other social practices, and occasionally inciting acts of honour killings. The Khap system is also used for social reform in the Jat community. The Indian farmer's activist Mahendra Singh Tikait was head of the Baliyan Khap until 2011.

Khaps are clan-councils, presided over by clan elders and notables. An assembly of Khap leaders is known as a Khap Panchayat, and an assembly of several Panchayats is known as a Sarv Khap.

Historically, Jat Khaps would raise militias to secure their own interests, usually capturing new territory for the clan or pushing for increased autonomy from the imperial centre. For example, the Baliyan Khap was headquartered in the village of Sisuali in the 12th century, from where they would begin their campaigns of "territorial expansion, conquest and colonization", until members of the Baliyan clan eventually dominated the entire Pargana of Sisuali by the 16th century. During the reign of Akbar, the Mughal government would grant many concessions to prominent Jat Khaps, including the Baliyan Khap, waiving "imposts that the Jats had resisted for centuries" in exchange for their support of the new tax reforms.

=== Military ===
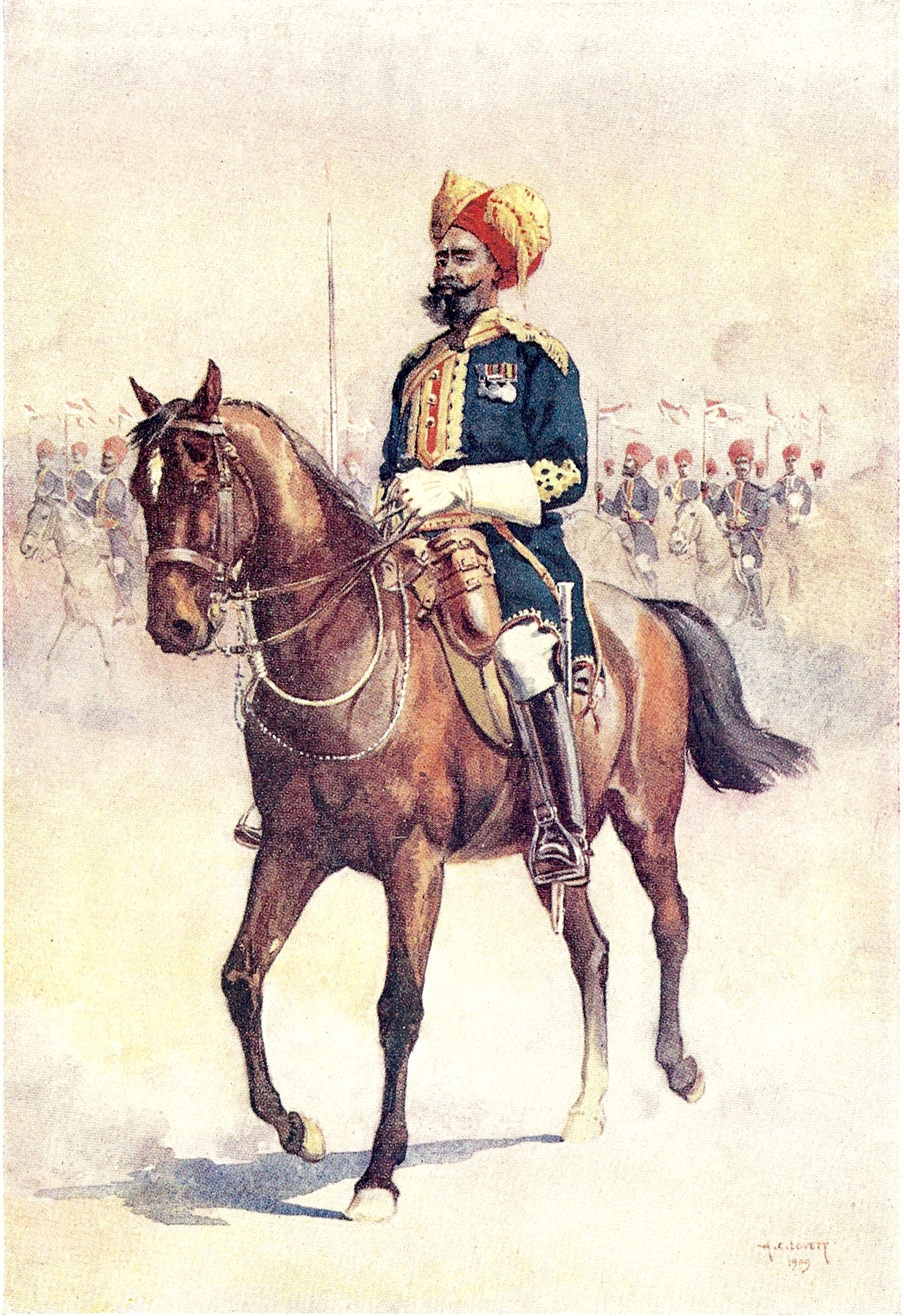
14th Murrays Jat Lancers (Risaldar Major) by AC Lovett (1862–1919)

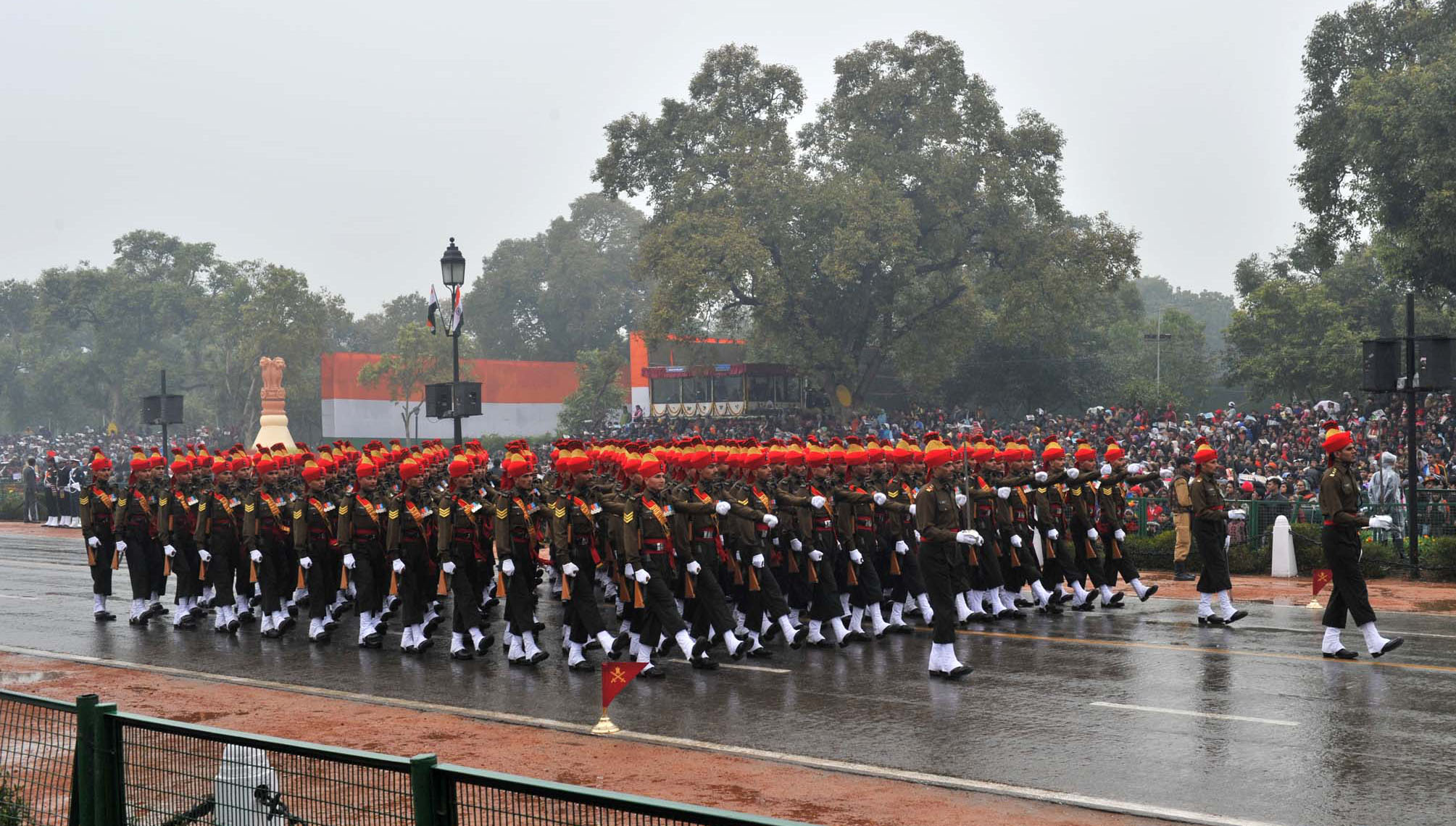
A contingent of the Jat Regiment of Indian Army, during the Republic day parade

Many Jat people serve in the Indian Army, including the Jat Regiment, Sikh Regiment, Rajputana Rifles and the Grenadiers, where they have won many of the highest military awards for gallantry and bravery. Jat people also serve in the Pakistan Army especially in the Punjab Regiment.

The Jat people were designated by officials of the British Raj as a "martial race", which meant that they were one of the groups whom the British favoured for recruitment to the British Indian Army. This was a designation created by administrators that classified each ethnic group as either "martial" or "non-martial": a "martial race" was typically considered brave and well built for fighting, while the remainder were those whom the British believed to be unfit for battle because of their sedentary lifestyles. However, the martial races were also considered politically subservient, intellectually inferior, lacking the initiative or leadership qualities to command large military formations. The British had a policy of recruiting the martial Indians from those who has less access to education as they were easier to control. According to modern historian Jeffrey Greenhunt on military history, "The Martial Race theory had an elegant symmetry. Indians who were intelligent and educated were defined as cowards, while those defined as brave were uneducated and backward". According to Amiya Samanta, the martial race was chosen from people of mercenary spirit (a soldier who fights for any group or country that will pay him/her), as these groups lacked nationalism as a trait. The Jats participated in both World War I and World War II, as a part of the British Indian Army. In the period subsequent to 1881, when the British reversed their prior anti-Sikh policies, it was necessary to profess Sikhism in order to be recruited to the army because the administration believed Hindus to be inferior for military purposes.

The Indian Army admitted in 2013 that the 150-strong Presidential Bodyguard comprises only people who are Hindu Jats, Jat Sikhs and Hindu Rajputs. Refuting claims of discrimination, it said that this was for "functional" reasons rather than selection based on caste or religion.

=== Varna status ===
There are conflicting scholarly views regarding the varna status of Jats in Hinduism. Historian Satish Chandra describes the varna of Jats as "ambivalent" during the medieval era. Historian Irfan Habib states that the Jats were a "pastoral Chandala-like tribe" in Sindh during the eighth century. Their 11th-century status of Shudra varna changed to Vaishya varna by the 17th century, with some of them aspiring to improve it further after their 17th-century rebellion against the Mughals. He cites Al-Biruni and Dabistan-i Mazahib to support the claims of Shudra and Vashiya varna respectively.

The claim at that time of Kshatriya status was being made by the Arya Samaj, which was popular in the Jat community. The Arya Samaj saw it as a means to counter the colonial belief that the Jats were not of Aryan descent but of Indo-Scythian origin.

Christopher Bayly writes that the ruling dynasties among the Jats, Rajputs and Maratha, that arose when the Islamic cultural influence diminished, mostly originated from peasant of nomadic castes, but they performed rituals such as Śrāddha by employing high status Brahmins. These communities hoped that such rituals would enable them to make a Kshatriya claim.

Dipankar Gupta states that the reason that originally low castes, such as Jat or Rajput, who had a shudra status in the early medieval era, have been enabled to claim Kshatriya status in modern times is due to political power. He also says that Rajputs, Jats, Marathas - all claim Kshatriya status but do not accept each other's claim. There is no agreement on who is a true kshatriya caste.

=== Marriage ===
Jat marriages are traditionally structured around clan (gotra) exogamy and village exogamy, with marriage within the same gotra or village typically prohibited. At the same time, caste endogamy is commonly observed, with Jats marrying within their own community. These practices are considered important for maintaining kinship alliances and social cohesion across villages and regions.

Jat weddings combine pan-Indian rituals with local customs. Ceremonies often include processions, communal feasts, and ritual gifting, serving both social and symbolic functions. Weddings are frequently public events, used to reinforce clan ties, demonstrate social status, and maintain local prestige.

In some regions, informal caste councils (khap panchayats) have historically played a role in regulating marriages. These councils may enforce community norms, particularly regarding same-gotra, inter-village, or inter-caste unions. While such councils have been criticised for restricting individual choice, they have traditionally functioned as a mechanism for maintaining social order within Jat community.

=== Rajput-Jat relations ===
André Wink states that some Rajputs may be Jats by origin. Tanuja Kothiyal states that modern research reveals that Jats is one of the communities from which Rajputs have emerged, the others being Bhils, Mers, Minas, Gujars and Raikas. This is contradictory to the British colonial era false narrative that these communities had a Rajput origin. She points to the fact that "both Rajputs and Jats appear to originate from the mobile cattle rearing and rustling groups", hence it is understandable that they refer to each other in their chronicles, although they try to remain distinct. However, since Rajputs dominated the region, they were portrayed as "warriors" as opposed to Jats who were portrayed as "farmers", thus wiping out "Jat kingship" from the historiography. The Rajputs refused to accept Jat claims to Kshatriya status during the later years of the British Raj and this disagreement frequently resulted in violent incidents between the two communities.

=== Female infanticide and the status of women in society ===
During the colonial period, many communities including Hindu Jats were found to be practising female infanticide in different regions of Northern India.

A 1988 study of Jat society pointed out that differential treatment is given to women in comparison to men. The birth of a male child in a family is celebrated and is considered auspicious, while the reaction to the birth of a female child is more subdued. In villages, female members are supposed to get married at a younger age and they are expected to work in fields as subordinate to the male members. There is general bias against education for the female child in society, though trends are changing with urbanisation. Purdah system is practised by women in Jat villages which act as hindrance to their overall emancipation. The village Jat councils which are male-dominated mostly don't allow female members to head their councils as the common opinion on it is that women are inferior, incapable and less intelligent to men.

== Clan system ==
The Jat people are subdivided into numerous clans, some of which overlap with the Ror, Arain, Rajput and other groups. Hindu and Sikh Jats practise clan exogamy.

=== List of clans ===
- Ahlawat
- Anjana Chaudhari
- Aulakh
- Bagri
- Bajwa
- Babbar
- Beniwal
- Bharwana
- Brar
- Buttar
- Chahal
- Cheema
- Dabas
- Dahiya
- Deol
- Dharan
- Dhaliwal
- Dhillon
- Dholiya
- Gill
- Godara
- Grewal
- Jakhar
- Kaswan
- Khakh
- Khangura
- Kharal
- Lashari
- Malhi
- Malik
- Maulaheri
- Mirdha
- Muley
- Naich
- Panwar
- Poonia
- Rath (also known as Rathi and Rathee)
- Rahal
- Randhawa
- Ranjha
- Rehvar
- Sahota
- Sandhawalia
- Sandhu
- Sangwan
- Sekhon
- Sial
- Sidhu
- Sihag
- Sinsinwar
- Sodhi
- Teotia
- Thaheem
- Tomar
- Virk
- Warraich

== See also ==
- Jat reservation agitation
- Meo (ethnic group)
- World Jat Aryan Foundation
- List of Jat dynasties and states
- Jāti
