= Khakh =

Khakh is surname belonging to the Jat clan. Most of those with the name are followers of Sikhism and Islam, but a large number of Sikhs also exist among those identifying with the name. Just like many other Jatt castes, the Khakh originate in the historical Punjab region of South Asia. Today, the surname is widely popular across Indian Punjab, New Delhi and Pakistani Punjab.

A fairly significant number of Khakh also reside in Western nations, namely Canada, the United Kingdom and the US. These are likely to be Khakh caste-members, and their descendants, who immigrated to these developed countries in recent years.

Relatively, the village of Khakh in Hoshiarpur District Near Tanda in the Indian state of Punjab, is also named after this clan. An even larger town (by population), that is also named after the Khakh people, is located in Tarn Taran District of the Punjab State of India. There is also a village name Dodey in district Jalandhar all the residents are KHAKH with last name is around 500 people living in the village and most of them now live in Canada, USA, UK, and Germany. A population of the Khakh clan can also be found in the village of Mirzapur Jande, located in the Hoshiarpur district of Punjab, India.

== Location ==
Modern-day Khakh people are scattered across the western regions of Pakistan, and the north-western regions of India. These regions would now constitute the area that was called the Punjab before the Partition of 1947.

=== Pakistan ===
In Pakistan, much of the Khakh have settled in the Saraiki-belt of Pakistan. The Khakh are specifically present in the following places of Punjab Province (Pakistan):

- Basira Union Council, Muzaffargharh Tehsil, Muzaffargharh District
- Kot Chutta Tehsil, Dera Ghazi Khan District
- Multan District
- Khushab District
- Khanewal District
- Rohilanwali
- Rohilanwali
- Muzaffar Garh
- Kot Addu
- Sanawan

In the locations mentioned above, most of the Khakh people speak Saraiki as a first language.

=== India ===
In India, most of the Khakh(s) live in the state of Punjab and New Delhi. But some also reside in Haryana and the Union Territory of Chandigarh.

A large population of Indian Khakhs are concentrated in the city of Chandigarh, India.

Most Khakh(s) in India are Sikh, and speak Punjabi and Hindi as their first languages.

=== North America ===
Today, in Canada and the US a large number of people identify with the last name Khakh, are first or second generation immigrants with Indian origin.

Quite like other Asian-origin communities, much of the people from the Khakh caste, are concentrated in the Western states/provinces, of the US and Canada respectively. In Canada, much are present in British Columbia.

== Notable persons ==
- Baljit Singh Khakh, neuroscientist and professor of physiology and neurobiology at UCLA
