= Major soil deposits of India =

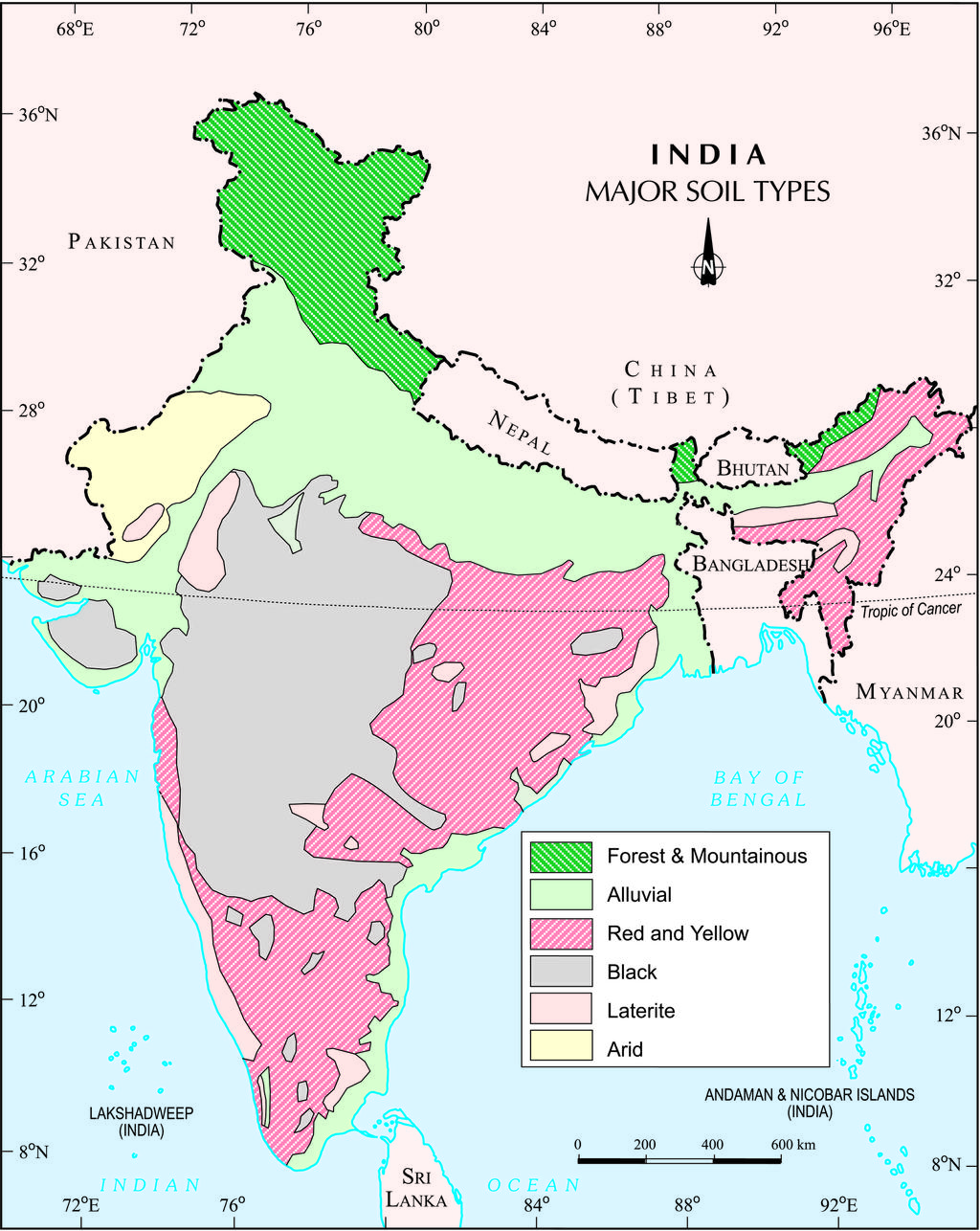
Major soil types in India

USDA - Soil orders of the South Asian region. A : Acrisols B : Cambisols C : Chernozems D : Podzoluvisols E : Rendzinas F : Ferralsols G : Gleysols H : Phaeozems I : Lithosols J : Fluvisols K : Kastanozems L : Luvisols M : Greyzems N : Nitosols O : Histosols P : Podzols Q : Arenosols R : Regosols S : Solonetz T : Andosols U : Rankers W : Planosols X : Xerosols Y : Yermosols Z : Solonchaks

There are seven soil deposits in India. They are alluvial soil, black soil, red soil, laterite soil, arid soil, forest soil, mountainous soil, and marsh soil. These soils are formed by various geographical factors. They also have varied chemical properties. Sundarbans mangrove swamps are rich in marsh soil. The Deccan Plateau and the Chota-Nagpur Plateau are rich in red soil due to high igneous rock content from prehistoric volcanic activity.

== Major soil deposits ==
Soil deposit	Description	Image
Alluvial soil	Alluvial soil have been deposited by the Indus, the Ganges, and the Brahmaputra rivers. The entire northern plains (including parts of Arunachal Pradesh, Assam, Bihar (Almost entirely), Chandigarh, Delhi (almost entirely), Haryana, Himachal Pradesh, Madhya Pradesh, Punjab, Rajasthan, Uttarakhand, Uttar Pradesh, and West Bengal) are made of alluvial soil. These soil also extend in Rajasthan and Gujarat through a narrow corridor. It is also found in the eastern coastal plains particularly in the deltas of Mahanadi, the Godavari, the Krishna, and the Kaveri rivers. Alluvial soil as a whole are very fertile. Mostly these soils contain adequate proportion of potash, phosphoric acid and lime which are ideal for the growth of sugarcane, paddy, wheat, and other cereal and pulse crops.	Alluvial soil deposit
Black soil	Black soil is typical of the Deccan trap (Basalt) region spread over northwests Deccan Plateau and is made up of lava flows. They cover the plateaus of Maharashtra, Saurashtra, Malwa, Madhya Pradesh, and Chattishgarh and extend in the south-east direction along the Godavari and the Krishna valleys. Also known as regur soil, black soil is ideal for growing cotton and is known as black cotton soil. They are rich in soil nutrients, such as calcium carbonate, magnesium, potash and lime. These soils are generally poor in phosphoric contents. The black soils are made up of clayey soil, well known for their capacity to hold moisture. Because of their high clay content, black soils develop wide cracks during the dry season, but their iron-rich granular structure makes them resistant to wind and water erosion. They are poor in humus yet highly moisture-retentive, thus responding well to irrigation. Those soils are also found on many peripheral tracts where the underlying basalt has been shifted from its original location by fluvial processes. The sifting has only led to an increased concentration of clastic contents.	Black regur soil in Buldhana, Maharashtra
Red and yellow soil	Red soil develops on crystalline igneous rocks in areas of low rainfall in the eastern and southern parts of the Deccan Plateau. Yellow and red soils are also found in parts of Odisha, Chhattisgarh, West Bengal, Maharashtra, southern Karnataka, Tamil Nadu, Madhya Pradesh. Red and yellow soils develop a reddish colour due to diffusion of iron in crystalline and metamorphic rocks. It looks yellow when it occurs in a hydrated form.	
Laterite soil	Laterite soils are mainly found in Karnataka, Kerala, Tamil Nadu, Madhya Pradesh, Andhra Pradesh and the hilly areas of Odisha and Assam. After adopting appropriate soil conservation techniques particularly in the hilly areas of Karnataka, Kerala and Tamil Nadu, this soil is very useful for growing tea and coffee. Red laterite soils in Tamil Nadu, Andhra Pradesh and Kerala are more suitable for crops like cashew nut. The laterite soil develops in areas with high temperature and heavy rainfall. This is the result of intense leaching due to heavy rain. The name "Laterite" is derived from the Latin word "later" which means a brick. Its red colour is due to the iron oxide. When this soil becomes wet, it becomes smooth like butter and when it is dry, it becomes very hard. It is formed due to the change of dry and moist climate and due to the prevention of silica-based material. Humus content of the soil is low because most of the microorganisms, particularly the decomposers, like bacteria, get destroyed due to high temperature and lack of organic matter which is food, shelter and protection for the microorganisms from the high temperatures. Laterite soils are suitable for cultivation.	Abandoned laterite quarry in Angadipuram, Kerala
Arid soil	Arid soils range from red to brown in colour. They are generally sandy in texture and saline in nature. In some areas the salt content is very high and common salt is obtained by evaporating the water. Due to the dry climate, high temperature, evaporation is faster and the soil lacks organic matter and moisture which is the raw material needed for humus. The lower horizons of the soil are occupied by Kankar because of the increasing calcium content downwards. The Kankar layer formations in the bottom horizons restrict the infiltration of water. After proper irrigation these soils become cultivable as has been in the case of western Rajasthan.	Arid land in Chandeni, Haryana
Forest soil	Forests soils are found in the hilly and mountainous areas where sufficient rainforests are available. The soils texture varies according to the mountain environment where they are formed. The soil is loamy and silty in valley sides and coarse-grained in the upper slopes. It is acidic with low humus content in the snow-covered areas.	

== Alluvial Soil ==
The rivers deposit very fine particles of soil in different parts of India. This type of soil is widespread in the Northern Plains of India. Alluvial soils are rich in humus as they are deposited by three important rivers of the Himalayas, Indus River, Ganges and Brahmaputra River. They are found in the eastern coastal plains of India, particularly in the deltas of rivers Mahanadi, Godavari River, Krishna River and Kaveri. These are generally rich in Phosphoric acid, lime and potash, and is well known for its water holding capacity which makes it ideal for growing sugarcane, paddy, wheat and other cereal crops.colour of alluvial soil is light grey or ash grey due to the presence of high iron content.

== Mountain soils ==
Mountain soils are found in the valleys and hill slopes of the Himalayas at altitudes of 2500 m to 3000 m. These soils are often the vegetation cover helps in their classification. The carbon nitrogen ratio is very wide. They are silty loam to loam in texture and dark brown in colour.

== Desert soils ==
These soils are found in Thar Desert in the Indian state of Rajasthan and Gujarat. This soil is formed from arid condition with practically negligible rainfall. It contain a high percentage of soluble salts but have low moisture content and low water-retaining capacity. This type of soil is highly pervious and have a low density. It requires to increase its bearing capacity. Commonly recognised plants that grow in these soils are cactus.

== Black soils ==
This type of soil is black in colour. These soils are also called as regur soils. In the north-western found Deccan Plateau. The soil is suitable for growing cotton, due to which it is also known as black cotton soil. It is believed that the climatic conditions along with the parent rock material are the important factors for the formation of black soil. This type of soil is typically of the Deccan trap region spread over Northwest Deccan plateau and is made from lava flows. They cover the plateaus of Maharashtra, Saurashtra, Malwa, Madhya Pradesh, Chhattisgarh and extend in South-East direction along Godavari and Krishna valleys. These soils contain essential clay minerals as montmorillonite. These soils cover an extensive area of 300,000 square kilometres. The engineering properties of such soils are as follows:

- High compressibility
- Low bearing capacity
- Low shearing strength

They are made up of clayey materials. These soils are renowned for their excellent water retention. They are rich in such materials as calcium carbonate, magnesium, potash and lime. During summer, and times of high heat and low moisture, this soil develops cracks. The formation of these cracks provides an excellent mechanism of self-aeration in the soil. The soil becomes very hard when dry and muddy when wet, and thus requires deep tilling to manage drainage.

== Red Soils ==
Red soil is a type of soil that develops in the warm, temperate, moist climate under deciduous or mixed forest, having thin organic and organic-mineral layers overlying a yellowish-brown leached layer resting on an illuvium red layer. Red soils are generally derived from crystalline rock. They are usually poor growing soils, low in nutrients and humus and difficult to cultivate because of its low water holding capacity.

== Laterite soils ==
Laterite soils are formed from chemical decomposition of rocks, the name is derived from the latin root "later", meaning "brick". soils mainly contain iron oxide which gives them characteristic pink or red color. These soils are found in Central, Eastern and Southern India. These are residual soils is formed from basalt and have high specific gravity. These soils are mostly composed as calcite depositions. They are more suitable for crops like cashew nut.

== Marine deposits ==
These soils are found in a narrow belt near the south-west coast of India. These soils have low shearing strength and high compressibility. The marine clays are soft and highly plastic. They contain large amount of organic matter and are not suitable for construction of megastructures like buildings, cranes etc.
