= Kaswan =

Kaswan is an Indian surname of Jats. They are primarily found in Rajasthan.

== Notable persons ==
- Deep Chand Kaswan, Indian politician
- Rahul Kaswan, Indian politician
- Ram Singh Kaswan, Indian politician
