= Ramnarayan =

Ramnarayan is a given name. Notable people with the name include:

- Ramnarayan Dudi (born 1948), Indian politician
- Ramnarayan Goswami (died 2010), Indian communist politician and peasant leader
- Ramnarayan Mandal, Indian member of the Bihar Legislative Assembly
- Ramnarayan Meena (born 1943), Indian member of the Rajasthan Legislative Assembly
- Ashutosh Ramnarayan Neekhra (born 1967), Indian actor, poet, TV presenter, author and singer
- Ramnarayan V. Pathak, Indian Gujarati-language poet, short story writer, essayist and literary critic
- Pandit Ramnarayan (1927–2024), Indian musician and sarangi player
- Venkatraman Ramnarayan (born 1947), Indian cricketer, journalist, editor, translator and teacher
- Ramnarayan Rawat, Associate Professor of history at the University of Delaware
- Ramnarayan Yadavendu (1909–1951), Hindi writer, storyteller, essayist and social reformer

== See also ==
- Lynching of Ramnarayan Baghel, 2025 in Kerala, India
