= Mirdha =

Mirdha is a clan of Jats, mostly found in the Marwar region of Rajasthan state.

== Mirdha family ==
The Mirdha family is a political and social dynasty from Nagaur district in the Indian state of Rajasthan. This family is known for its contributions to the cooperative movement, farmers’ rights, and political leadership in the state. Originating from the village of Kuchera in Nagaur district, the Mirdha family has played a pivotal role in shaping the socio-political landscape of Rajasthan, particularly within the Jat community. The family’s legacy spans several generations, with members holding influential positions in politics, administration, and social reform. The surname “Mirdha” is originated as a title awarded to the family for managing the postal system in Marwar, known as the “Mirdha Dak,” during the pre-independence era.

Notable persons of the Mirdha family of Nagaur Includes:

Baldev Ram Mirdha (1889–1953)

His leadership in the farmers’ movement earned him the title “Kisan Kesari” (Lion of the Farmers). He laid the foundation for the Mirdha family’s political and social influence, which was carried forward by his descendants. Baldev Ram had three children, including Ramniwas Mirdha.

Nathuram Mirdha (1921–1996)

Nathuram was the grandson of Mangla Ram Mirdha and the son of Thana Ram Mirdha, making him the nephew of Baldev Ram. Nathuram was a prominent Indian politician and a key figure in the cooperative movement. He represented the Nagaur constituency in the Lok Sabha for six terms, beginning in 1971, and was known for his resilience in maintaining political influence despite challenges, such as the anti-Congress wave of 1977. He served as a Union Minister and was the Rajasthan Congress chief. He was elected to the Rajasthan Legislative Assembly for four terms.
