= Jakhar =

Jakhar is a surname of Indian origin. It may refer to:

== Notable persons with the surname ==
- Badri Ram Jakhar, Indian politician
- Balram Jakhar, Indian politician
- Geetika Jakhar, Indian wrestler
- Jagat Jakhar, Indian film actor
- Rahul Jakhar, Indian para-pistol shooter
- Ramavtar Singh Jakhar, Indian volleyball player
- Sandeep Jakhar, Indian politician
- Sunil Kumar Jakhar, Indian politician
