= Rohilanwali =

Pakistani town

روھیلانوالی
- City
- Rohillan wali
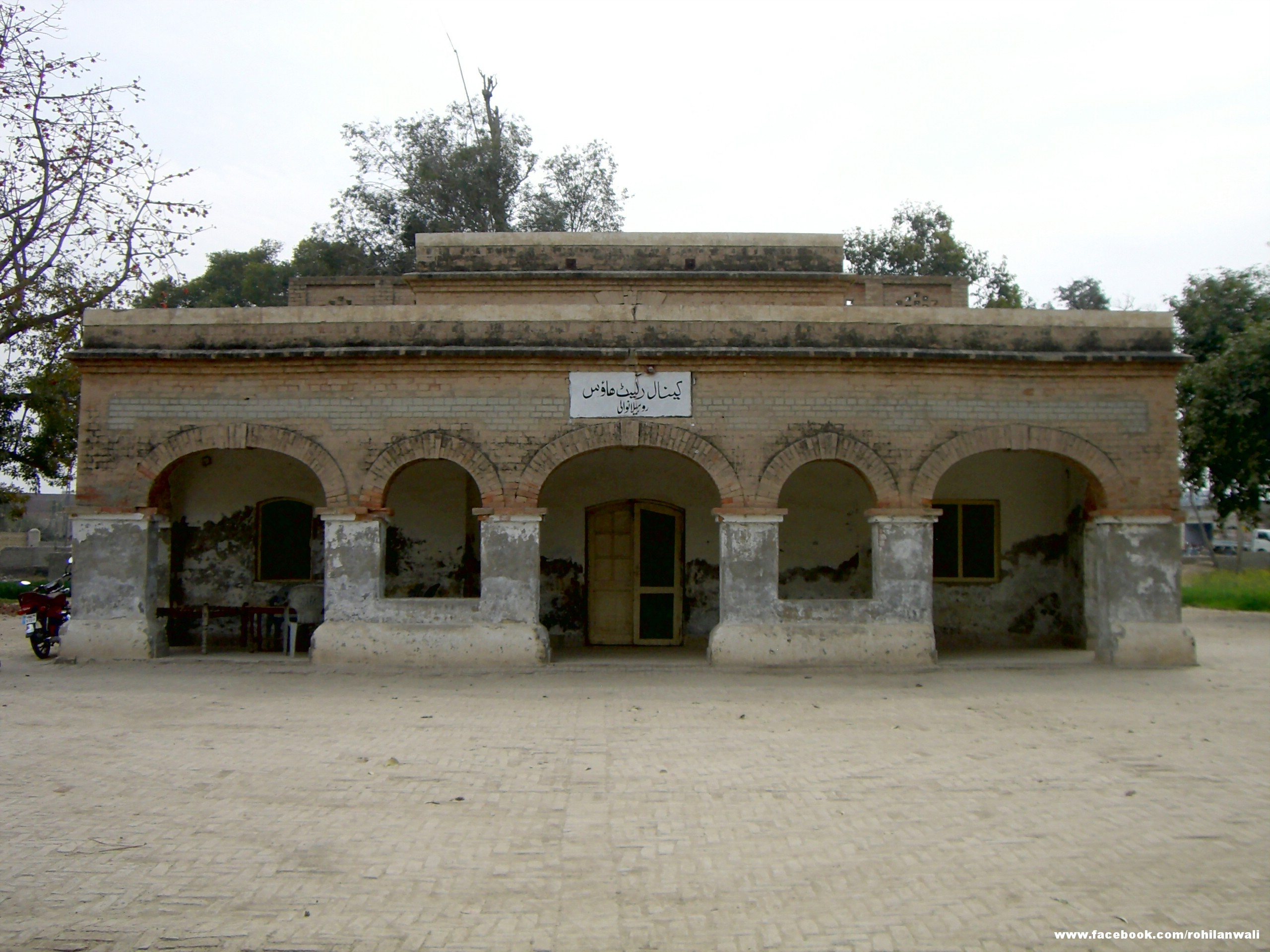
- Canal Rest House Rohilanwali (front view of building)
- Interactive map of روھیلانوالی
- Coordinates: 29°45′55″N 71°04′09″E
- Country: Pakistan
- Region: Punjab
- District: Muzaffargarh District
- Union council No.: 47

Government
  - Nazim: ---------------
  - Naib nazim: ---------------

Population (2010)
  - Total: 29,826
- Time zone: UTC+5 (PST)
  - Summer (DST): UTC+6 (PDT)
- Postal code: 34400
- Dialling code: 066

Rohilanwali (Urdu: روہِيلاں والى), is a town in the Muzaffargarh District of Punjab (Pakistan). Situated in the southern Punjab, it lies between Chenab river to the east and the Indus River to the west. The surrounding region is characterised by flat, fertile alluvial plains, making it ideal for agriculture. This area is particular renowned for its abundant citrus and mango farms, which thrive in the rich soil.

== Climate ==
Rohilanwali features an Arid climate with very hot summers and mild winters. The city witnesses some of the most extreme weather in the country. The highest recorded temperature is approximately 54 °C (129 °F), and the lowest recorded temperature is approximate −1 °C (30 °F). The average rainfall is roughly 127 millimeters (5.0 in). Dust storms are a common occurrence within the city. Places near Rohilanwali

== Welfare programs ==
For the welfare and betterment of this area, a society named Youth Empowerment Society (YES) is voluntarily doing career counseling among school students. Team YES, led by Mr. Usman Fiaz, is available to help younger students.

== Transportation ==
Rohilanwali has connections with other cities by a variety of means of transportation. The city is linked with Muzaffargarh, DG Khan, Layyah and Multan districts through concrete roads. Buses to Multan leave frequently, since it is located closely to the city. There are a variety of buses travelling farther from the city. Many of them are now air-conditioned with a fairly good safety record. The N-5 connects the city to connect to all parts of Pakistan. The road otherwise, known as GT Road, allows connections to Rawalpindi, Islamabad, Faisalabad, Karachi, Lahore as well as Bahawalpur.

== Railway ==
After Reaching Muzaffargarh it is connected by rail with all parts of the country and lies on the Branch track between Rawalpindi, Multan, Mianwali and Attock. The main Peshawar-Karachi railway line passes through Multan district.

== Airport ==
The People of Rohilanwali use Multan International Airport because it is nearer and on 2 hours drive Multan International Airport is an airport situated 10 km away from the city center of Multan. It is not as large as the other airports in Pakistan, as it operates to cater mainly to the population of Multan, Vehari, Khanewal, Rajanpur, Sahiwal, and Pakpattan to mainly to other points within Pakistan as well as the Middle East. Flight are currently operated by the national flag carrier, Pakistan International Airlines. However, since the growth of air travel within the region, there has been speculated interest from other private carriers. The rise in air-travel has also led to the expansion of the current airport with a new runway and terminal.

== Agriculture ==
=== Major crops ===
Cotton, Wheat, and Sugarcane are the main crops grown in Rohilanwali. Rice, Jawar, Bajra, Moong, Mash, Masoor, peanuts, Maize and oil seeds such as rape, Mustard and Sunflower are also grown in minor quantities in the district.

=== Fruits ===
Mangoes, dates, citrus and pomegranate are the main fruits grown in Rohilanwali. Dates, Jaman, Pears, Phalsa and Bananas are also grown in minor quantities in the city.

=== Vegetables ===
Onions, Carrots, Cauliflower, Moolis and peas are the main vegetables grown in Rohilanwali. Okra, Turnips, Tomatoes, Potatoes, garlic and Chilies are also grown in the city in minor quantities.

== Forests ==
In whole district Muzaffargarh, An area of 100,864 acres is forested. There is also linear plantation of 1250 A.V. mile the roads/rails/canals in the district. Trees grown in the area are Kikar, Shisham, Mullberry, Eucalyptus, Bamboo and coconut.

== Neighbouring areas ==
Fifty six kilometres south of Rohilanwali lies Panjnad Head Works, where five rivers meet: Sutlej, Ravi, Chanab, Beas and Indus. Rohillan Wali is a Tehsil level town and its people hopes that it will became Tehsil soon. Surrounding Mouza of Rohillan Wali are :

Rohillan Wali

Gulab Wala

Lohar wala (East & West)

Bhounday Wali

Alouday Wali

Ibrahim Wali

Ponta Malanra

Makhen Bela

Pati Darigh

Khadhi Balocha

Mahal Khakhi (North & South)

Mochi Wali (West & East)

Khan bela
