= Jessy Chahal =

- Born: Jasminder Kaur Chahal; 24 November; Kuala Lumpur, Malaysia
- Occupations: Actress; TV host MC (Master of Ceremonies)
- Known for: Miss Malaysia

Jessy Chahal (Full name: Jasminder Kaur Chahal, born 24 November) is a local celebrity in Malaysia. She is an actress, TV host and Emcee. She is also the title holder of Miss Malaysia India Worldwide 2002.

== See also ==
- Sikhism in Malaysia
- Indians in Malaysia
