= Ramavtar Singh Jakhar =

Indian former volleyball player (born 1970)

Ramavtar Singh Jakhar (born 15 May 1970) is a retired international volleyball player from Jhunjhunu district in Rajasthan. He is a gold medalist in South Asian Games. He won gold medal in 1991 South Asian Games and won silver medal in 1993 South Asian Games. He serves as a chairperson for the Volleyball Federation of India. He is recipient of the Maharana Pratap Award. He is also secretary of Rajasthan Volleyball Association. His father Navrang Singh Jakhar was a member of the Rajasthan Legislative Assembly from Nawalgarh. His son Dushyant Singh Jakhar has captained the Indian men’s national volleyball team at 2022 Asian Cup.
