= Chahal Konar =

Coordinates: 30°45′22″N 50°04′41″E

Chahal Konar چهل كنار
- Village
- Interactive map of Chahal Konar
- Country: Iran
- Province: Khuzestan
- County: Behbahan
- Bakhsh: Tashan
- Rural District: Tashan-e Gharbi

Population (2006)
  - Total: 220
- Time zone: UTC+3:30 (IRST)
  - Summer (DST): UTC+4:30 (IRDT)

Chahal Konar (Persian: چهل كنار, also Romanized as Chahal Konār) is a village in Tashan-e Gharbi Rural District, Tashan District, Behbahan County, Khuzestan Province, Iran. At the 2006 census, its population was 220, in 50 families.
