= Lynching of Ramnarayan Baghel =

Mob lynching in Kerala

- Location: Attappallam, Walayar, Palakkad district, Kerala, India
- Date: 17 December 2025; ~18:00 (IST)
- Attack type: Mob lynching, hate crime
- Deaths: 1
- Motive: Suspicion of theft, racial/xenophobic abuse
- Accused: 5

On 17 December 2025, 31‑year‑old Ramnarayan Baghel, an Indian migrant labourer from Chhattisgarh, was assaulted and killed by a group of local residents in the Attappallam area of Walayar, Palakkad district, Kerala. Baghel had travelled to Kerala in search of work and was confronted on suspicion of theft; during the attack assailants repeatedly questioned him about his identity, including whether he was "Bangladeshi", a racialised slur linked with xenophobic prejudice in India's political discourse. The Kerala government and public figures characterised the incident as a manifestation of wider patterns of hate crimes and mob violence against migrants and marginalised groups in India, prompting debate on racial and communal intolerance in the country’s social fabric.

== Background ==
Ramnarayan Baghel (also reported as Ramnarayan Bhayar), 31, was a native of Karhi village in Sakti district, Chhattisgarh. He travelled to Kerala on 13 December 2025 in search of employment and was reportedly engaged as a daily‑wage labourer in the Kanjikode industrial area prior to his death.

== Incident ==
On 17 December 2025, around 6 pm, Baghel was confronted by local residents in Attappallam, Walayar on suspicion of theft. According to police reports and local news accounts, the group questioned and physically assaulted him without any legal authority; during the confrontation some assailants repeatedly asked whether he was “Bangladeshi,” a phrase widely associated with xenophobic stereotyping of migrants in India’s public discourse. Despite no evidence of theft, Baghel was beaten with sticks and other blunt objects, collapsed, and later died of his injuries at Palakkad District Hospital.

== Injuries and post‑mortem ==
The post‑mortem examination revealed that Baghel had sustained extensive injuries across his body, with over eighty separate wounds, internal bleeding, and severe trauma consistent with prolonged assault. The severity of the injuries was noted by medical professionals as extreme compared to typical trauma cases.

== Investigation ==
Kerala Police registered a murder case under Section 103(1) of the Bharatiya Nyaya Sanhita. Five people were arrested in connection with the lynching and remanded to judicial custody, and a Special Investigation Team was formed to identify further suspects and complete a thorough investigation.

== Reactions ==
=== India ===
==== Government ====
Members of the Kerala government condemned the lynching and called for strict action against the perpetrators. Kerala Chief Minister Pinarayi Vijayan described the killing as unacceptable in a progressive society and assured justice for the victim’s family, including compensation from state funds. State Local Self Government Minister M. B. Rajesh characterised the killing as the result of “hate politics” that has permeated Indian society at large, alleging that the victim had been stigmatised as a Bangladeshi prior to the assault.

==== Non‑government ====
Opposition figures also criticised the incident. Indian National Congress leader K. C. Venugopal condemned the killing as “beyond shocking” and called for immediate compensation and action, noting that mob violence threatens communal harmony and public safety.

==== Bangladesh ====
Bangladesh’s government and civil society expressed concern over the lynching of Ramnarayan Baghel and other violent incidents targeting minorities and migrant workers in India, framing them within broader regional concerns about hate crimes and violence against vulnerable groups. In a statement on 28 December 2025, the Bangladesh Ministry of Foreign Affairs said it was “deeply concerned” about reports of brutal killings, mob violence, arbitrary detentions and disruptions of religious ceremonies targeting minority communities in India, including Muslims and Christians, and urged Indian authorities to conduct impartial investigations and bring perpetrators to justice.

Bangladeshi officials explicitly referenced violence against minorities in India, including the deaths of individuals allegedly targeted after being labeled “Bangladeshi”, describing such incidents as part of wider patterns of mob violence and xenophobic suspicion. Officials highlighted concerns over the safety of cross-border Bengali-speaking populations and religious minorities, reiterating that all states have an obligation under international norms to protect the rights and security of minority communities.

Bangladesh also responded to statements by Indian officials regarding minority violence within Bangladesh, rejecting what Dhaka described as selective or misleading portrayals. Bangladeshi authorities stressed that isolated criminal incidents should not be framed as systemic persecution and warned that such narratives could undermine bilateral trust. The government reiterated its official policy of zero tolerance toward violence against any religious or ethnic group.

Commentary in Bangladeshi media framed the lynching within the context of rising anti-immigrant discourse and xenophobic narratives in parts of Indian public life. Analysts noted that the repeated labeling of victims as “Bangladeshi” prior to acts of violence reflects broader identity-based hostility tied to nationality, language, and religion. Such narratives were linked to concerns over exclusionary politics and growing social intolerance in India.

Bangladeshi civil society groups and human rights commentators further warned that the use of the "Bangladeshi" label as a pretext for violence has functioned as a vehicle for xenophobic aggression, often intersecting with religious and linguistic prejudice. Editorials in Bangladeshi newspapers called for stronger legal safeguards, accountability mechanisms, and regional cooperation to counter hate crimes and protect vulnerable communities in South Asia.

=== International ===
The lynching of Ramnarayan Baghel drew attention beyond Kerala and was discussed in the context of broader issues of mob violence, xenophobia and hate crimes in India. Analysts and commentators noted that such incidents are not isolated but part of a larger pattern of violence and discrimination against migrants and marginalised groups, highlighting concerns about societal intolerance and communal tensions in India. Editorial analysis in The Hindu linked the attack on Baghel to a series of violent attacks on migrants wrongly labelled as “Bangladeshi” in other states, suggesting a disturbing trend of mob violence across the country.

Political leaders outside Kerala framed the incident as symptomatic of broader xenophobic tensions. West Bengal Chief Minister Mamata Banerjee criticised targeted violence against Bengali‑speaking migrant workers, describing it as persecution and pledging support for affected families, particularly after separate lynching incidents in Odisha involving similar accusations of “illegal Bangladeshi” identity.

Commentary from editorial and opinion pages framed the Baghel lynching within a national crisis of social conscience and governance, noting that internal migrants are essential to India’s economy yet face violence and discrimination that violate constitutional protections and hinder mobility. The New Indian Express editorial argued that such violence represents a systemic failure to protect vulnerable populations.

International reporting and human rights monitoring have previously documented lynchings and hate crimes in India as ongoing concerns. Independent research has found significant increases in hate speech against minorities, particularly Muslims, which has been linked to broader societal and political trends that critics argue contribute to environments where mob violence occurs. A 2025 analysis by a research group documented a substantial rise in anti‑minority hate speech incidents across India, particularly around major political campaigns, which rights advocates cited as a factor underlying incidents of mob violence. Scholars and civil rights analysts often situate mob lynchings and hate crimes within historical patterns of communal and caste‑based violence in India, arguing that these reflect structural flaws in enforcement and societal polarization. Reports on lynching and hate violence have called into question the efficacy of law enforcement and the protection of constitutional rights for all citizens, with some legal analyses characterising mob killings as symptomatic of weaker institutional responses to hate speech and vigilante justice.

International human rights reporting on violence against minorities in India has also documented lynchings, including those targeting religious minorities, noting that such incidents contribute to a climate of insecurity and have drawn criticism from global observers and civil society organisations.

While the Baghel lynching was primarily debated within India’s domestic context, its coverage in regional editorial analysis and political commentary abroad highlighted concerns about intra‑national intolerance, regional migrant vulnerability, and the legal and societal challenges of protecting human rights in diverse multi‑ethnic societies.

=== Public and civil society responses ===
Rights groups and migrant worker advocates demanded that authorities ensure accountability for the killing and implement measures to protect vulnerable communities. Legal commentators noted that the violent interrogation, including repeatedly asking whether the victim was a Bangladeshi national, reflected persistent cultural biases and the dangers of mob justice in contemporary India.

=== Protests ===
In India, protests and vigils were held that called the incident "deeply disturbing" and unacceptable in a society that prides itself on secular values and law and order. The Kerala Chief Minister pledged strict action against those responsible. State ministers additionally highlighted the racialised abuse directed at Baghel during the assault and framed the killing within wider concerns over hate politics and discrimination against migrants and minority groups.

== See also ==
- Mob lynching in India
- Lynching of Angel Chakma
