= Sangwan =

Sangwan is a surname of the Jat people found in the Indian states of Haryana, Rajasthan and Uttar Pradesh.

Notable people with the name include:

- Kishan Singh Sangwan (born 1948), Indian politician, member of the 14th Lok Sabha
- Pradeep Sangwan (born 1990), Indian cricketer
- Rambir Singh Sangwan, Indian constable and kabaddi player
- Sumit Sangwan (born 1993), Indian amateur boxer
- Usha Sangwan, Indian businesswoman
