= Dholiya =

- village
- Location in Rajasthan
- Coordinates: 27.58°N 74.54°E
- Country: India
- State: Rajasthan
- District: Didwana Kuchaman
- Tehsil: Ladnun

Population (2011)
  - Total: 3,122

Languages
- Time zone: UTC+5:30 (IST)
- Postal code: 341304
- ISO 3166 code: RJ-IN

Dholiya is a village in the Ladnun Tehsil of the Didwana Kuchaman district of Rajasthan, India.It is located approximately 18 km from the nearby town of Jaswantgrah and 26 km from Didwana. Dholiya is also known as the "White City" due to its name, which signifies the color white.

== Geography ==
Dholiya is located at 27.58°N 74.54°E.

== Demographics ==
As of 2011 India census, Dholiya had a population of 3,122. Males constitute 1,603 of the population and females 1,519.
