= Janian, SBS Nagar =

Janian
- Village
- Location in Punjab, India Janian (India)
- Coordinates: 31.0415549°N 76.2276276°E
- Country: India
- State: Punjab
- District: Shaheed Bhagat Singh Nagar

Government
  - Type: Panchayat raj
  - Body: Gram panchayat
- Elevation: 355 m (1,165 ft)

Population (2011)
  - Total: 604
- Sex ratio 314/290 ♂/♀

Languages
  - Official: Punjabi
- Time zone: UTC+5:30 (IST)
- PIN: 144515
- Telephone code: 01823
- ISO 3166 code: IN-PB
- Post office: Jadla
- Website: nawanshahr.nic.in

Janian is a village in Shaheed Bhagat Singh Nagar district of Punjab State, India. It is located 29 kilometres (18 mi) away from postal head office Banga, 17 kilometres (11 mi) from Nawanshahr, 22 kilometres (14 mi) from district headquarter Shaheed Bhagat Singh Nagar and 85 kilometres (53 mi) from state capital Chandigarh. The village is administrated by Sarpanch an elected representative of the village.

== Demography ==
As of 2011, Janian has a total number of 126 houses and population of 604 of which 314 include are males while 290 are females according to the report published by Census India in 2011. The literacy rate of Janian is 83.14%, higher than the state average of 75.84%. The population of children under the age of 6 years is 76 which is 12.58% of total population of Janian, and child sex ratio is approximately 551 as compared to Punjab state average of 846.

Most of the people are from Schedule Caste which constitutes 58.11% of total population in Janian. The town does not have any Schedule Tribe population so far.

As per the report published by Census India in 2011, 201 people were engaged in work activities out of the total population of Janian which includes 171 males and 30 females. According to census survey report 2011, 59.70% workers describe their work as main work and 40.30% workers are involved in Marginal activity providing livelihood for less than 6 months.

== Education ==
KC Engineering College and Doaba Khalsa Trust Group Of Institutions are the nearest colleges. Industrial Training Institute for women (ITI Nawanshahr) is 14.6 kilometres (9.1 mi) away from the village. Lovely Professional University is 60 kilometres (37 mi) away from the village.

List of schools nearby:

- K.C. Public School, Nawanshahr
- Govt. Senior Secondary School, Haila
- Rayat Institute Of Engineering & Technology, Railmajra
- Guru Teg Bahadur Model School, Behram
- Sandhu Institute Of Nursing, Mahalon

== Transport ==
Nawanshahr railway station is the nearest train station however, Garhshankar Junction railway station is 25 kilometres (16 mi) away from the village. Sahnewal Airport is the nearest domestic airport which located 60 kilometres (37 mi) away in Ludhiana and the nearest international airport is located in Chandigarh also Sri Guru Ram Dass Jee International Airport is the second nearest airport which is 169 kilometres (105 mi) away in Amritsar.

== See also ==
- List of villages in India
