= Janian (Amritsar district) =

Village in Punjab, India

Jania is a village in Amritsar I tehsil, Amritsar district, Punjab, India. The village is 19 km from the sub-district headquarters of Amritsar and 1 km from its district headquarters.

The total population of the village is 2,268 people where number of male population 1,187 and female population is 1,099. The PIN code of the village is 143115.
