= Nahla Chahal =

Lebanese writer, researcher and activist

Nahla Chahal is an Iraqi-Lebanese writer, journalist, researcher and activist, born to an Iraqi father and Lebanese mother, who were both communist militants. She was one of the leaders of the Organization of Communist Action of Lebanon and a participant in the Lebanese Communist Party. She is also a columnist at Al Hayat pan Arabic newspaper, which is published in London. She taught at the Lebanese University for eleven years, then she later moved to Paris to focus more on research and is now president of the Arab Women Researchers Association.

She is sister of late film director Randa Chahal and currently resides in Paris, France, where Randa died.

== Publications ==
- Une Irakité latente (2003), which was published in Le Moyen-Orient sous le choc
- La formidable capacité d’intégration du système libanais (2002)
- Avril à Jénine (2000)
