= Godara =

Godara is an Indian Jat surname.

== Notable people ==
- Sunita Godara, Indian marathon runner
- Sumit Godara, Indian politician
- Kiran Bishnoi Godara, Indian freestyle wrestler
- Harish Chaudhary, Indian politician
- Poosaram Godara, Indian politician
- Mani Ram Godara, Indian politician
