= Poonia =

Poonia or Punia or Puniya is a clan (or gotra) of Jats.

== Notable people ==
- Jai Narayan Poonia (1934–2021), Indian politician
- Krishna Poonia, Indian politician and discus thrower
- Navdeep Poonia, Scottish cricket player
- Poonam Poonia, Indian cricketer
- Surendra Poonia, Indian sportsman
- Usha Poonia, Indian politician
- Bajrang Punia, Indian wrestler
- Bijender Kumar Punia, vice chancellor of Maharshi Dayanand University
- Deepak Punia (cricketer), Indian cricketer
- K. R. Punia (1936–2025), Indian politician
- Mandeep Punia, freelance journalist from India
- Pavitra Punia, Indian actress
- Priya Punia, Indian cricketer
- Savita Punia, Indian field hockey player
- Seema Punia, Indian discus thrower
