= Bhanai =

Village in India

- Village
- Location in Rajasthan, India Bhanai (India)
- Coordinates: 28.96°N 75.25°E
- Country: India
- State: Rajasthan
- District: Hanumangarh district
- Tehsil: Bhadra

Population (2011)
  - Total: 2,505
- Time zone: UTC+5:30 (IST)
- PIN: 335501
- Telephone code: 01504
- Vehicle registration: RJ-31

Bhanai is a village in the Bhadra tehsil of Hanumangarh district in the state of Rajasthan, India. According to the 2011 Census of India, it has a population of 2,505. The village is primarily agrarian in nature.

== Nearby places ==
Nearby villages include Birmi Patta Anoopshahar, Ajeetpura, Bhadi, Uttardabas, and Sidhmukh. Nearby towns include Bhadra, Taranagar, and Nohar. Bhadra Taranagar Nohar Hisar Rajgarh Churu are the nearby cities.

== Demographics ==
According to the 2011 Census of India, the total population of Bhanai was 2,505, including 1,305 males and 1,200 females.

== Geography ==
Bhanai is a village located in the Hanumangarh district of Rajasthan, India. It lies at coordinates 28.96°N latitude and 75.25°E longitude.

The village is situated in the north-western part of Rajasthan, which is characterized by a semi-arid climate with hot summers and mild winters. The terrain mainly consists of sandy plains with agricultural land. The average elevation of the area is approximately 201 metres (659 feet) above sea level.

Agriculture in the region is supported by irrigation systems, including canal networks such as the Indira Gandhi Canal, which plays a significant role in the district's water supply.

== Transport ==
Bhanai is connected to nearby towns and villages through a network of local roads. The nearest town is Bhadra, which provides access to regional road connectivity within the district.

The nearest railway stations include Tahsil Bhadra railway station and Sidhmukh railway station, which connect the area to other parts of Rajasthan and neighbouring states through the Indian Railways network.

== Education ==
Bhanai has access to basic educational facilities, including primary and secondary schools in the village and nearby areas. For higher education, students often travel to nearby towns such as Bhadra and Sidhmukh, where colleges and other institutions are located.

Higher education in the region is supported by institutions in surrounding towns, which provide undergraduate-level courses to students from rural areas.

== See also ==
- Bhadra
- Hanumangarh district
- Rajasthan
