= Ratanpura, Churu district =

Ratanpura
- village
- Location in Rajasthan, India Ratanpura (India)
- Coordinates: 28°32′04″N 75°15′34″E
- Country: India
- State: Rajasthan
- District: Churu District
- Tehsil: Rajgarh
- Established: 1848
- Founder: Ratan Singh
- Named for: Maharaja Ratan Singh

Government
  - Type: Panchayati raj
  - Body: Gram panchayat
  - Sarpanch: Mukesh sharma
  - Member of Parliament: Rahul Kaswan
- Elevation: 239 m (784 ft)

Population (2022)
  - Total: 4,030

Languages
  - Official: Hindi
  - Spoken: Hindi, Marwari, Rajasthani
- Time zone: UTC+5:30 (IST)
- PIN: 331023
- Telephone code: 01559
- ISO 3166 code: RJ-IN
- Vehicle registration: RJ-10
- Max Summer Temp: 50 °C (122 °F)
- Min Winter Temp: −5 °C (23 °F)
- Website: ratanpura.webs.com

Ratanpura is a village in Rajgarh tehsil of Churu district in Rajasthan. It was established in 1848, and is situated 45 km northeast of Churu and 17 km southwest of Rajgarh.

== History ==
Ratanpura was founded in 1848. This village started with a single cottage named after Maharaja Ratan Singh. who secured that cottage from the landlord of this area.

== Location ==
It is situated in 45 km northeast direction of Churu and 17 km southwest of Rajgarh. Neighbouring villages are Jharsar Chhota, Amarpura, Hadiyal, and Dokwa.

== Demographics ==
Ratanpura is a large village located with total 700 families residing. The Ratanpura village has population of 3316 of which 2085 are males while 2031 are females as per Population Census 2011.

Average Sex Ratio of Ratanpura village is 968 which is higher than Rajasthan state average of 928. Child Sex Ratio is 1020, higher than Rajasthan average of 888.

Literacy rate of Ratanpura village was 66.51% compared to 66.11% of Rajasthan. In Ratanpura Male literacy stands at 80.82% while female literacy rate was 51.61%.

Schedule Caste (SC) constitutes 25.87% while Schedule Tribe (ST) were 2.39% of total population in Ratanpura village.

== Climate ==
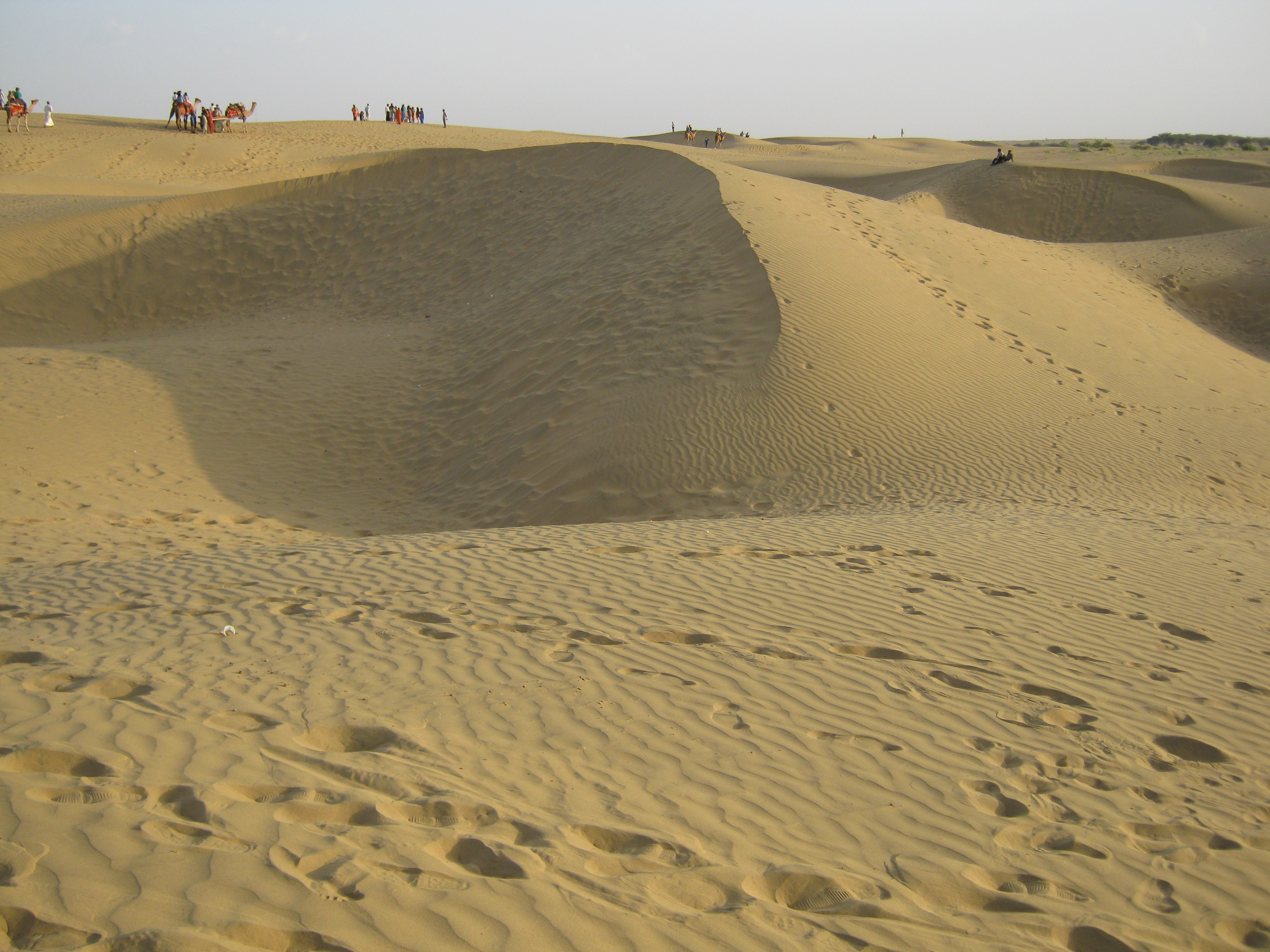
Sand dunes near Ratanpura, Rajasthan

Ratanpura is situated in the Thar Desert and has a hot desert climate with very little rainfall and extreme temperatures. In summer temperatures can exceed 45 °C, and during the winter they may dip below freezing.

The climate in Ratanpura is characterised by significant variations in temperature. In the summer season it is very hot when the temperatures lie in the range of 28–50 °C (82–122 °F). In the winter, it is fairly cold with temperatures lying in the range of −5–23.2 °C (23.0–73.8 °F).

== Education ==
Ratanpura is considered to be a progressive village of the region.

=== Schools ===
- Govt. Primary School, Ratanpura English medium school
- S.S.S. Govt. Senior Secondary School, Ratanpura

=== Colleges ===
- Tagore Gramothan College, Ratanpura

== Transportation ==
=== Road ===
Ratanpura is situated between Rajgarh or Churu on National Highway 52 (NH 52). Bus or taxi connections to Ratanpura are available from both cities.

=== Rail ===
Ratanpura is situated on the main Delhi-Bikaner rail link. The railway station of Ratanpura is known as Hadyal. It takes around 3–4 hours from Delhi (via major stations like Gurgaon, Rewari, Mahendragarh, Loharu). Till 2011 the route had metre gauge track that was converted to 5 ft 6 in (1,676 mm) broad gauge. Several new trains now connect Ratanpura or Hadyal to major cities Delhi, Bikaner, Jaipur, Lucknow, Degana, Sri Ganganagar, Hisar and Hanumangarh.

=== Air ===
The nearest airports are Delhi Airport and Jaipur Airport.

== Religion ==
All people of Ratanpura village belong to Hindu religion. There is a temple of Hanumanji, Thakur ji, Sani maharaj, शनि देव मंदिर and some others.
