= Jharsar Chhota =

- Village
- Location in Rajasthan, India Jharsar Chhota (India)
- Coordinates: 28°32′24″N 75°12′35″E
- Country: India
- State: Rajasthan
- District: Churu District
- Tehsil: Taranagar

Government
  - Sarpanch: Shri richpal singh kasnia

Population (2011)
  - Total: 1,086

Languages
  - Official: Hindi
  - Spoken: Hindi, Marwari, Rajasthani
- Time zone: UTC+5:30 (IST)
- PIN: 331023
- Telephone code: 01561
- ISO 3166 code: RJ-IN
- Vehicle registration: RJ-10
- Max Summer Temp: 46 °C (115 °F)
- Min Winter Temp: 1 °C (34 °F)

Jharsar Chhota is a village in India, located in the Taranagar city, Churu district, and Rajasthan state.

== Location ==
Jharsar Chhota is situated in 50 km northeast direction of Churu city and 27 km southeast of Taranagar. Its neighbouring villages are Dhani Poonia, Ratanpura, Rajpura, Satyun, Abhaypura, and Amarpura Dham.

== Jat Gotras ==
- Kasnia (कासनिया)
- Dhuwan (धुआं)
- Bhakar (भाकर)
- Poonia (poonia)

== Population ==
As of the census of 2011, there are 1,086 residents of Jharsar Chhota: 572 male and 514 female.

== Religion ==
All people belong to Hindu religion. There is one temple of Hanuman.
