= Dhani Poonia =

Dhani Poonia Poonia Ki Dhani
- Village
- Location in Rajasthan, India Dhani Poonia (India)
- Coordinates: 28°34′05″N 75°11′19″E
- Country: India
- State: Rajasthan
- District: Churu District
- Tehsil: Taranagar

Government
  - Body: sarpanch

Population (2011)
  - Total: 1,867

Languages
  - Official: Hindi
  - Spoken: Hindi, Marwari, Rajasthani
- Time zone: UTC+5:30 (IST)
- PIN: 331023
- Telephone code: 01561
- ISO 3166 code: RJ-IN
- Vehicle registration: RJ-10
- Max Summer Temp: 46 °C (115 °F)
- Min Winter Temp: 1 °C (34 °F)

Dhani Poonia or Poonia Ki Dhani is a village in Taranagar tehsil of Churu district in Rajasthan.

== Location ==
It is situated in 50 km northeast direction of Churu city and 27 km southeast of Taranagar. Its neighbouring villages are Jharsar Chhota, Chimanpura, Rajpura, Satyun.

== Jat Gotras ==
- Poonia
- Karwasra
- Mundariya

Sunia

== Population ==
As of the census of 2011, there are 867 people out of them 437 are male and 430 are female.

== Economy ==
The main occupation of the villagers is agriculture. There are 40 persons serving the Indian Army, Central and State Govts. About 15 people have gone to Arab countries for earning.

== Education ==
Dhani Poonia is considered to be a progressive village of the region. There is a Government Upper Primary School. Secondary and Higher Secondary education students go to Chimanpura and Taranagar.

== Religion ==
All people belong to Hindu religion. There is one temple of Hanumanji and one Medi of Gogaji.
