= Malwas =

Village in Rajasthan, India

- Village
- Location in Rajasthan, India Malwas (India)
- Coordinates: 28.4°N 75.7°E
- Country: India
- State: Rajasthan
- District: Churu
- Tehsil: Sidhmukh

Population (2011)
  - Total: 1,302
- Time zone: UTC+5:30 (IST)

Malwas is a village in the Churu district of the Rajasthan state in India. It is located in the Sidhmukh tehsil near the Haryana border. According to the Census of India 2011, the village has a population of 1,302 people. The village is primarily dependent on agriculture and falls under the Churu Lok Sabha constituency and Taranagar Assembly constituency.

== Geography ==
Malwas is a village located in the Sidhmukh tehsil of Churu district in Rajasthan, India. It lies in the semi-arid region of northern Rajasthan, near the fringe of the Thar Desert.

The village is situated close to the Haryana state border. Nearby towns include Sidhmukh, Taranagar, and Pilani.

== Transportation ==
The nearest major airports are Indira Gandhi International Airport in Delhi and Jaipur International Airport. Malwas is well connected by road to nearby towns such as Sidhmukh, Taranagar, and Pilani. Local transport facilities include private vehicles and bus services connecting the village to surrounding areas. The village is accessible via local roads that connect it to nearby towns and agricultural markets. Road transport is the primary mode of connectivity. The nearest railway stations include Sidhmukh railway station ,Hisar Junction railway station, and Sadulpur Junction railway station, which provide connectivity to major cities such as Delhi, Bikaner, and Jaipur. Bus services are available from nearby towns such as Sidhmukh and Taranagar, connecting the village to cities in Rajasthan and Haryana.

== Nearby places ==
Malwas is located near Dadrewa, a religious site associated with Gogaji, a folk deity in Rajasthan and Haryana. Dadrewa is considered the birthplace of Gogaji and attracts devotees from different parts of northern India, especially during religious fairs.

=== Malwas data 2011 ===
Particulars	Total	Male	Female	Total no. of houses	277	-	-
Population	1,302	698	604
Children (0–6)	177	86	91
Schedule caste	165	85	80
Schedule tribe	0	0	0
Literacy	58.40%	67.81%	47.17%
Total workers	758	396	362
Main workers	486	0	0
Marginal workers	272	72	200

== Education ==
Malwas has basic educational facilities, including government and private schools that provide primary and secondary education. For higher education, students depend on nearby towns such as Sidhmukh and Taranagar.

One of the nearby institutions is Smt. Sankutla Devi Government College, located in Sidhmukh, which provides undergraduate education to students from surrounding villages.

== See also ==
- Churu district
- Rajasthan
- Sidhmukh
