= Changoi =

- Village
- Location in Rajasthan, India Changoi (India)
- Coordinates: 28.68°N 75.28°E
- Country: India
- State: Rajasthan
- District: Churu

Government
  - Sarpanch: altitude = 223

Population (2010)
  - Total: 4,749

Languages
  - Official: Hindi
- Time zone: UTC+5:30 (IST)
- PIN: 331304
- Telephone code: 01561
- Vehicle registration: RJ 10

Changoi is a village in district Churu, Rajasthan. It is a panchayat headquarters and the current sarpanch is Renu Kanwar. It is a historical village which was the under control of the Bikaner State of Rajputana.

== History ==
Changoi is a village which was controlled by Rathore sardars called Rajvi. Rajaji Brijlal Singhj was the last jagirdar, who had an honour of tajeem from Bikaner State. In his jagir he had 12 villages which were given to his ancestor Raja Bhawani Singhji (nephew of Maharaja Gaj Singh, then ruler of Bikaner State) by then ruler of Bikaner State Maharaja Surat Singhji in 1804. It is a twin village join along with Mikhala, which the headquarters of the panchayat.

This village is famous for a temple of Babhuta Sidh Maharaj near Matani Bass, who is known for getting the people out from the danger of any kind of snakebite. A huge religious fair of Bhabhuta Siddh Maharaj is arranged every year at 'Bhadva sudi Saptmi' (a date of Vikram Samvat). There is a little fort also, called Changoi Garh. There is an ancient chhatri (a Hindu tomb) in memory of Banmali Das, stepbrother of Maharaja Anoopsingh, ruler of Bikaner State in the 18th century.

Before Banmalidas was killed, he had fortified the fortress of Changoi, intending to make it his capital after Aurangzeb assigned half the kingdom of Bikaner to him.

== Transport ==
Transport facility in Changoi is leverage. No rail and State roadways service is available. Jeep services are available to the Tehsil headquarters Taranagar. private bus services also available in this village from (1) Taranagr to Rajgarh via Changoi (2) Bain to Taranagar via Changoi (3) Bhadara to Taranagar via Changoi and Bain (4) Bhadara to Churu via Changoi and Taranagar (5)Taranagr to Bhadra, (6) Bain to Bikaner. private bus service for Taranagar to Bhadra is via Changoi, Pandreu, Bain, Dungrana.

== Sister towns ==
- Mahlana Rajgarh, Churu
- Bain, Churu
- Ghasla, Taranagar, Churu
