= Tamba Kheri =

- Village
- Location in Rajasthan, India Tamba Kheri (India)
- Coordinates: 28.90°N 75.43°E
- Country: India
- State: Rajasthan
- District: Churu
- Tehsil: Sidhmukh

Government
  - Type: Gram Panchayat

Population (2011)
  - Total: 1,623
- Time zone: UTC+5:30 (IST)
- Vehicle registration: RJ-10

Tamba Kheri is a village located in Sidhmukh of Churu district in the state of Rajasthan, India. As per 2011 Census of India, it has population of 1623 of which 865 are males while 758 are females. The village is administered under Sidhmukh tehsil and is part of the Shekhawati region of Rajasthan. Agriculture is the primary occupation of the residents of the village.

== Geography ==
Tamba Kheri is situated in Sidhmukh tehsil of Churu district in the Indian state of Rajasthan. The village lies in the Shekhawati region and experiences a semi-arid climate.

== Demographics ==
According to the 2011 Census of India, Tamba Kheri had a population of 1,623 residents, including 865 males and 758 females.

== Administration ==
The village is administered through a Gram Panchayat under Sidhmukh tehsil in Churu district.

== Economy ==
Agriculture and animal husbandry are among the primary occupations of the residents of the village.

== Transport ==
Tamba Kheri is connected by road to nearby towns of Churu district. The nearest railway station is Sidhmukh railway station.

== See also ==
- Sidhmukh
- Churu
- Rajasthan
