= Girwarsar =

- village
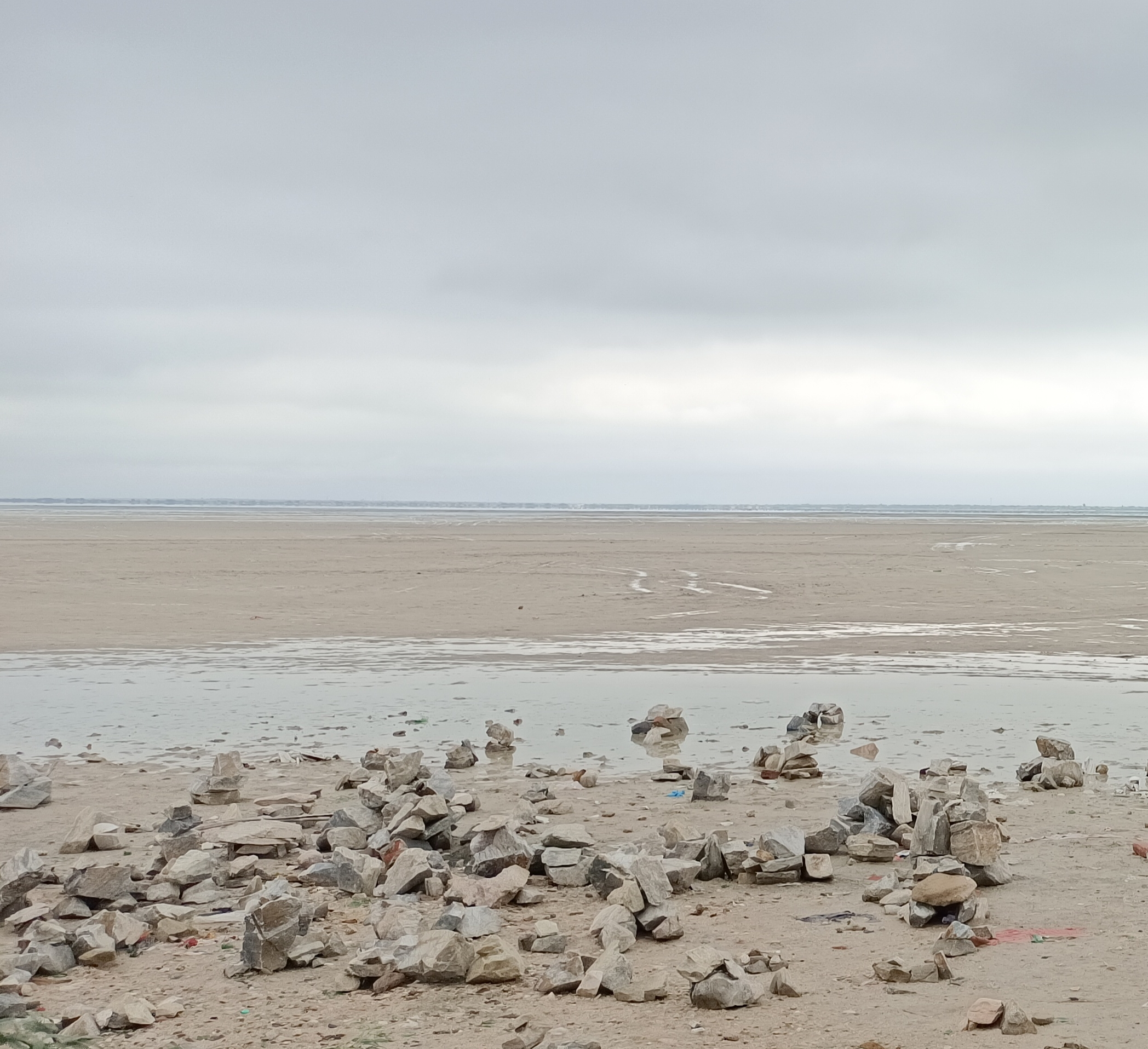

- Location in Rajasthan, India Girwarsar (India)
- Coordinates: 27.75°N 73.926°E
- Country: India
- State: Rajasthan
- District: Churu

Government
  - Body: Panchayati Raj
- Elevation: 217 m (712 ft)

Population (2011)
  - Total: 2,717

Languages
  - Official: Rajasthani; Hindi
  - Additional Official: English
- Time zone: UTC+5:30 (IST)
- PIN: 331517
- Vehicle registration: RJ-44

Girwarsar is a village in Bidasar tehsil of Churu district in Rajasthan, India. It is located at a distance of 9 km from Jaipur-Bikaner Highway. It is 13km from Jasrasar Tehsil, 270 km from Jaipur, 100 km from Bikaner and 430 km from Delhi. This is a gram panchayat of Bidasar tehsil.

== Demographics ==
People of Hindu religion live in the village. There is a market in the center of the village where all kinds of essential commodities are available.People buy their daily use items from about 30 retail shops here. Apart from this, all the necessary facilities like Gram Panchayat, Hospital, etc. are available in the village. There are about 250 wells in the fields in the village. The agriculture based economy is mainly dependent on crops like groundnut, gram, wheat, millet, guar, moth bean etc.
