= Dhani Kumharan, Taranagar =

Coordinates: 28°36′N 75°04′E

Dhani Kumharan is an Indian village located in the Taranagar tehsil of Churu district, Rajasthan. In 2001, the population was 2,297 people with 1,142 males and 1,155 females .

== See also ==
- List of villages in Churu district
