= Likhmidas =

Indian Hindu saint (1750–1830)

Likhmidas Solanki (8 July 1750 – 8 September 1830) is a noted saint from Rajasthan belonging to the Mali or Sainik Kshatriya or Rajput Mali community. He is believed to have done many miracles during his lifetime. Sainik Kshatriyas, who are often referred to as "Rajput Mali," are nowadays frequently counted as part of the Saini community in the census — which is based on permission granted by the jodhpur maharaja in the year of 1937 on february 6 by the orders printed in government press of jodhpur state.

The ancestors of the Sainik Kshatriyas were originally Rajput warriors and nobles. They were known for their bravery in battles against the Muslim rulers of Delhi — such as Shahabuddin Ghauri, Qutbuddin Aibak, Shamsuddin Iltutmish, Ghiyasuddin Khilji, and Alauddin Khilji.

In Vikram Samvat 1249 (1192 AD), after the fall of Prithviraj Chauhan, the Rajput warriors were deceitfully defeated in a great war led by Shahabuddin (Muhammad) Ghauri. Many brave Rajputs were martyred, while several others were taken captive.

Some Rajputs were killed in Ghazni, while others were forced to convert to Islam. Those who survived were left with only two choices — either to embrace Islam or to risk their lives. During this time, some Rajputs were helped by a man named Boba Mali from the Mahur Mali community. Boba Mali was a royal gardener (Shahi Mali) who intervened to save their lives. He pleaded before the rulers of Ghazni, claiming that those Rajputs were not warriors but Malis — his relatives.

Because of Boba Mali's intervention, many Rajputs were spared and later came to be known as Rajput Mali (now called Sainik Kshatriya Mali). These Rajputs belonged to the Chauhan, Dahiya, Tank, Gahlot, Sankhla, Kachwaha, Bhati, Solanki, Tanwar, Parihar, Parmar, Devda, and Rathore clans.

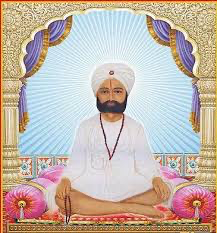

He was married and had two sons and daughter and lived in Nagaur in Rajasthan, India.

== Life ==
Santmidas ji was born on 8 July 1750 to Shrimati Nathi Devi in Amarpura, Rajasthan.

He married Cheney, daughter of Parsaramji Tak and they had two sons (Jagramji and Gendaji) and a daughter (Badigena).

Lekhmidas Ji Maharaj took samadhi on 8 September 1830 at Amarpura. Presently the Mahant of your Dham is Jituram Ji Maharaj.

== Legacy ==
His ishta-devata was Ramdevji. He has written many bhajans and dohas, which are very popular today.

The main dham of Likhmidas is Amarpura, where he other dhams are at Deh, Gudla, Tausar, Goa.

There are many followers of Likhmidas, especially in Rajasthan. His main temple is at Amarpura near Nagaur. The renovated large temple with pran-pratishtha of idol of Likhmidasji was inaugurated by erstwhile Chief Minister of Rajasthan, Vasundhara Raje on 6 December 2016.
