= Parevana =

- Country: India
- State: Rajasthan
- District: Churu

Population (Estimate)
  - Total: 5,000
- ISO 3166 code: RJ-IN

Parevana is a village in the Churu district of Rajasthan, India. Its population is about 5000.
