= Sandwa =

- Town
- Location in Rajasthan, India Sandwa (India)
- Coordinates: 27°45′N 74°10′E
- Country: India
- State: Rajasthan
- District: Churu
- Elevation: 312 m (1,024 ft)

Population (2015)
  - Total: 23,348

Languages
  - Official: Hindi
- Time zone: UTC+5:30 (IST)
- PIN: 331517
- Telephone code: 01560
- ISO 3166 code: RJ-IN
- Vehicle registration: RJ 10

Sandwa is a town in Churu district in the Shekhawati region of Indian state of Rajasthan.Sandwa is situated on Jaipur-Bikaner Highway (SR 20). It is 245 km away from the Jaipur, 125 km from Bikaner and 405 km from Delhi. Near Sandwa town is Chhapar, a small town that is home of the Tal Chhapar Sanctuary. Great wrestler Nathmal Pahalwan was from Sandwa.

It is the site of Sandwa Fort.

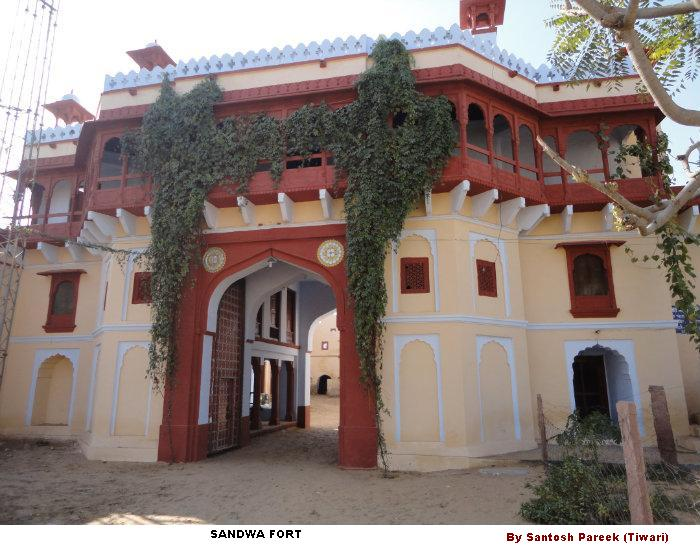
Sandwa Fort
