= Chhapar =

Chhapar Tal Chhapar
- City
- Location in Rajasthan, India Chhapar (India)
- Coordinates: 27.82°N 74.4°E
- Country: India
- State: Rajasthan
- District: Churu
- Elevation: 302 m (991 ft)

Population (2011)
  - Total: 19,744

Languages
  - Official: Hindi
- Time zone: UTC+5:30 (IST)
- Pincode(s): 331502

Chhapar is a small town and a municipality in Churu district in the state of Rajasthan, India. Chhapar and Tal chhapar is located in the Churu district of Northwestern Rajasthan in the Shekhawati region of India. It is 210 km from Jaipur and situated on the road from Ratangarh to Sujangarh. The Tal Chappar lies in the Sujangarh Tehsil of Churu district. It lies on the Nokha-Sujangarh state highway and is situated at a distance of 85 km from Churu and about 132 km from Bikaner. The nearest railway station is Chappar which lies on Degana-Churu-Rewari broad gauge line of Northern Western Railways. The nearest Airport is Jaipur International Airport (Sanganer) which is at a distance of 215 km from Chappar. It is known for black bucks but it is also home to a variety of birds. Here is a famous sanctuary known as Tal Chhapar Sanctuary

The Tal Chhapar Sanctuary is located on the fringe of the Great Indian Desert. Tal Chhapar nestles a unique refuge of the most elegant antelope encountered in India, "the Black buck". Tal Chhaper sanctuary, with almost flat tract and interspersed shallow, low-lying areas, has open grassland with scattered Acacia and prosopis trees which give it an appearance of a typical Savanna. The word "Tal" means plane land. The rain water flows through shallow, low-lying areas and collect in the small seasonal water ponds.

The geology of the zone is obscured by the wind blown over-burden. Some small hillocks and exposed rocks of slate and quartzite are found in the western side of the sanctuary. Area between hillocks and the sanctuary constitutes the watershed area of the sanctuary. The whole sanctuary used to be flooded by water during the heavy rains but with salt mining going on, rain water from the hillocks hardly reaches the sanctuary.

== Geography ==
Chhapar is located at 27.82°N 74.4°E. The sanctuary is named after Chhapar village which is located at 27°-50' North and 74°-25' East. It is a flat saline depression locally known as "Tal" that has a unique ecosystem in the heart of the Thar Desert, Perched at a height of 302 meters (990 feet) above sea level.

== Demographics ==
Chhapar is a Municipality city in district of Churu, Rajasthan. The Chhapar city is divided into 20 wards for which elections are held every 5 years. The Chhapar Municipality has population of 19,744 of which 10,066 are males while 9,678 are females as per report released by Census India 2011.

The population of children aged 0-6 is 2985 which is 15.12 % of total population of Chhapar (M). In Chhapar Municipality, the female sex ratio is 961 against state average of 928. Moreover the child sex ratio in Chhapar is around 871 compared to Rajasthan state average of 888. The literacy rate of Chhapar city is 68.61 % higher than the state average of 66.11 %. In Chhapar, male literacy is around 79.93 % while the female literacy rate is 57.05 %.

== Roads ==
Chhapar is well connected by roads with almost all major cities of Rajasthan and New Delhi. National Highway 65 passes through Chhapar that connects it to Jodhpur and Chandigarh. Other than this, Rajasthan Mega Highway also passes from the town which connects it to Ajmer and Hanumangarh. The direct bus service is available for Delhi, Surat, Ahmedabad, Udaipur, Jodhpur, Jaipur, Kota, Ajmer, Bikaner, Ganganagar, Hisar, Roorkee, Haridwar, Indore, Ludhiana and many other near and far towns.

== Schools, Colleges, Hospitals, Banks, Dharamshalas, Mandir and mosque ==
Schools

- Boys High Secondary School
- Girls High Secondary School
- Saraswati Vidha Mandir Madhaymik Vidhalay, Chhapar
- Tolaram Bhansali Bal Vidya Mandir
- Adarsh Vidya Mandir Secondary School
- Adarsh Vidya Mandir Primary School
- Ary School
- Anuvrat Vidya Mandir
- Shri Ram Bal Vidya Mandir
- Tagore Public School
- Marudhar Sikshan Sansthan
- Vivekanand Sikshan Sansthan
- Ramgopal Periwal Middle School
- Govt. Primary School No-1
- Govt. Primary School No-2
- Govt. Primary School No-3
- Govt. Primary Girls School
- Zakir Husen Shikchhan Sansthan
