= Birmi Khalsa =

Village in Churu district, Rajasthan, India

- Village
- Location in Rajasthan, India Birmi Khalsa (India)
- Coordinates: 28.77°N 75.27°E
- Country: India
- State: Rajasthan
- District: Churu district
- Tehsil: Sidhmukh

Government
  - Type: Panchayati raj
  - Body: Gram Panchayat Birmi Khalsa
  - Sarpanch: Pooja Lotasra

Population (2011)
  - Total: 751
- Time zone: UTC+5:30 (IST)
- PIN: 331701
- Telephone code: 01559
- Vehicle registration: RJ-10

Birmi Khalsa is a village in the Churu district of the state of Rajasthan, India. The village falls under the administrative jurisdiction of Sidhmukh tehsil. The settlement is primarily rural in character, and most of the residents are engaged in agriculture and livestock rearing.

== Geography ==
Birmi Khalsa is located in the rural region of Churu district in the Shekhawati region of Rajasthan. The village lies approximately 14 kilometres from the tehsil headquarters of Sidhmukh. The area has a semi-arid climate characterised by hot summers and low annual rainfall.

== Demographics ==
According to the 2011 Census of India, villages in Churu district are predominantly inhabited by communities engaged in agriculture and allied activities. Birmi Khalsa shares similar demographic characteristics typical of rural settlements in the district.

== Administration ==
Administratively, Birmi Khalsa falls under Sidhmukh tehsil of Churu district. Local governance is carried out through the gram panchayat system, which manages village-level development activities and civic administration.

== Economy ==
The economy of the village is mainly based on agriculture and animal husbandry. Crops such as wheat, mustard, gram and millet are commonly cultivated in the surrounding agricultural lands.

== Education ==
Students from Birmi Khalsa and nearby villages often pursue higher education in the nearby town of Sidhmukh. The town has a Government College that provides undergraduate education for students from surrounding rural areas.

== Transport ==
The village is connected to nearby towns through local road networks. The nearest railway facility is the Sidhmukh railway station, which provides rail connectivity to nearby districts and regions.
