= Deengli =

- village
- Nickname: Dingli
- Location in Rajasthan, India Deengli (India)
- Coordinates: 28.3867942°N 75.5071653°E
- Country: India
- ]: ]
- ]: Churu
- ]: ]

Area
  - Total: 1,056.58 ha (2,610.9 acres)

Population (2011)
  - Total: 2,197
  - Density: 207.9/km^{2} (538.5/sq mi)

Languages
  - Official: Hindi
- Time zone: UTC+5:30 (])
- PIN: 331305
- Telephone code: 01559
- ISO 3166 code: ]
- Vehicle registration: RJ-10
- Nearest city: Pilani
- Literacy: 71.98%
- ] constituency: ]
- Climate: Hyper-arid (Zone Ic)
- Max. temperature: 48 °C
- Min. temperature: -2.7 °C

Deengli (also known as Dingli) is a large village situated in the Rajgarh tehsil of the Churu district in], India. According to the 2011 Census of India, the village has a total population of 2,197 residing in 423 households, comprising 1,144 males and 1,053 females.

The village is governed by a Gram Panchayat system and falls under the administrative jurisdiction of the Sulkhnia Chhotta Gram Panchayat in the Bikaner Division. It is located 65 km east of the district headquarters in Churu and 230 km from the state capital, Jaipur.

The most significant socio-cultural landmark in the village is the Net Dada Ji Temple.

== Geography and Climate ==
Deengli covers a total geographical area of 1056.58 hectares. It is located in the northeastern quadrant of the Churu district, an area characterized by undulating plains and shifting sand dunes. The terrain falls within the hyper-arid environmental conditions of Agro-Climatic Zone Ic.

The climate is marked by extreme variations, with summer temperatures peaking at 48 °C and winter temperatures dropping as low as -2.7 °C. The region receives an average annual rainfall of 353.9 mm, mostly during the brief monsoon period from July to September.

== Demographics ==
The demographic profile based on the 2011 Census reveals:

- Sex Ratio: 920 females per 1,000 males.
- Child Population (0-6): 259 (11.79% of total), with a child sex ratio of 962.
- Social Groups: Scheduled Castes (SC) constitute 24.44% of the population, and Scheduled Tribes (ST) make up 1.50%.

== Education ==
The village maintains a literacy rate of 71.98%, exceeding both the district and state averages. Male literacy is 84.39%, while female literacy is 58.42%.

The primary educational center is the Shaheed Hari Singh Government Senior Secondary School (UDISE code: 08040220101). Established as a primary school in 1952, it has since been upgraded to senior secondary status and provides digital literacy through computer labs and government welfare schemes.

== Economy and Agriculture ==
The local economy is centered on agriculture and animal husbandry. Of the 1,406 workers in the village, 823 are main workers classified as cultivators.

- Crops: Primary Kharif crops include Bajra (pearl millet), Guar (cluster bean), and pulses. Rabi crops include Wheat, Mustard, and Chickpea (Gram).
- Livestock: Rearing of milch animals like buffaloes and goats is common, with households typically maintaining 2–3 animals. Camels are still reared for transport across the desert terrain.

== Infrastructure and Services ==
- Water Resources: Groundwater levels are deep (40–150 meters) and often brackish. Potable water is ensured via the Aapni Yojna project from the Indira Gandhi Canal. Residents also utilize traditional rainwater harvesting structures known as Tankas and Diggies.
- Connectivity: Private bus services operate directly within the village. The nearest railway station is Sadulpur Junction (Rajgarh), located approximately 16–17 km away.
- Public Services: The village is served by the Hamirwas sub-post office (PIN: 331305) and branches of the Baroda Rajasthan Kshetriya Gramin Bank.
