= Sandwa, Bhiwani =

Village in Haryana, India

Sandwa is a village in the Bhiwani district of the Indian state of Haryana. It lies approximately 40 kilometres (25 mi) west of the district headquarters town of Bhiwani. Sandwa is one of the biggest village of Bhiwani district. Population of Sandwa according to 2011 is about 7000. Sandwa has 2 government schools, 2 private schools, a government hospital, a number of temples, a playground and an Om Shanti Centre.For political representational purposes the village is part of Tosham Assembly constituency and the Bhiwani-Mahendragarh Lok Sabha constituency. The famous Shyam Baba Temple, one of the oldest temples of Baba Shyam, is also located in the village.

== History ==
It is known that the village was established by a man named "Sundu Kaliramana", after which the village is known as the "SANDWA". The brother of "Sundu Kaliramana" named "Shisram Kaliramana", established the village "Sisai".

A number of freedom fighters were given by this village, who dedicated their whole life for the country's freedom. Some of them joined INA.

== Geography ==
Sandwa village is located in southern Haryana. Sandwa is about 40 km from district headquarters (Bhiwani) and 20 km from Sub District (Tosham). The nearest railway station is Bhiwani Junction. The nearest airport is Hisar (in progress), about 60 km from village.

The village has a number of temples, 3 or 4 ponds, 2 government schools, 2 private schools, a government hospital and post office. A canal also passes through the village.

Sandwa village is located on the approach (4 km from Patodi ) from the State Highway joining Bhiwani (Haryana) to Bahal (Haryana).

Most villagers were Farmers or in Defence. The nearest villages are Alampur, Bhushan, Hasan, Khariawas, Patodi, Salewala, Sungrpur.
