= Dokwa =

- Village
- Location in Rajasthan, India Dokwa (India)
- Coordinates: 28°35′0″N 75°19′23″E
- Country: India
- State: Rajasthan
- District: Churu
- Tehsil: Rajgarh

Population (2011)
  - Total: 2,315

Languages
  - Official: Hindi
  - Spoken: Hindi, Marwari, Rajasthani, Haryanvi english
- Time zone: UTC+5:30 (IST)
- PIN: 331023
- Telephone code: 01559
- ISO 3166 code: RJ-IN
- Vehicle registration: RJ-10
- Max Summer Temp: 48 °C (118 °F)
- Min Winter Temp: 0 °C (32 °F)

Dokwa is a village in Rajgarh tehsil of Churu district in Rajasthan.

== Location ==
Dokwa is situated 51 km northeast of Churu and 8 km west of Rajgarh. Its neighbouring villages are Mundi Tal, Ratanpura and Bhamasi.

== Jat Gotras ==
- Poonia
- Sarawag
- Dhindhwal
- Mahla
- Jakhar
- Nehra
- Basera
- Kaswan
- Ranwa

== Verma Gotras ==
- Prajapat

only luhaniwal

== Population ==
As of the census of 2011, there are 2315 people, 1177 male and 1138 female.

== Economy ==
The main occupation of the villagers is agriculture. There are many people serving the Armed Forces, Central and State Government services. Many people have gone to Arab countries for work.

== Education ==
Dokwa is considered to be a progressive village of the region. Presently there is a Government Primary School and a Government higher Secondary School. There is a private secondary school also. For Higher Secondary education students go to Rajgarh.there is situated an English medium school ≤euro international kids school dokwa

== Religion ==
All people in the village are Hindu. There is one temple of Hanumanji.
