= Chalkoi =

Coordinates: 28°31′12″N 74°58′24″E

Chalkoi is a village in Churu tehsil of Churu district in Rajasthan.

== Demographics ==
Chalkoi have high literacy rates compared to the Rajasthan state average; for instance, Chalkoi Beekan recorded 66.74%.

== Economy ==
Agriculture is a primary occupation, with a significant number of residents working as cultivators.
