= Gugalwa =

- Village
- Interactive map of Gugalwa
- Coordinates: 28°33′N 75°37′E
- Country: India
- State: Rajasthan
- District: Churu district

Gugalwa is a small village in Rajasthan, India. Its population was 1593 in 2011.
