= Birmi Patta =

Village in Churu district

Birmi Patta Birmi Patta
- Village
- Location In Rajasthan
- Coordinates: 28°32′N 75°15′E
- India: india
- State: Rajasthan
- Disttrict: Churu
- Tehsil: Sidhmukh

Government
  - Type: Panchayati raj
  - Body: Gram Panchayat Dayawath
  - Sarpanch: JAITA

Population (2011)
  - Total: 751
- Time zone: UTC+5:30 (IST)
- Postal code: 331701
- Telephone code: 01559
- Vehicle registration: RJ-10

Birmi Patta is a village situated in Sidhmukh tehsil of Churu district, in the Indian state of Rajasthan, India. The settlement falls under the administrative jurisdiction of Gram Panchayat Birmi Khalsa and forms part of the Taranagar Assembly constituency. According to the Census of India 2011, the village had a population of 751 residents.

== Geography ==
Birmi Patta is located in the Churu district of the Indian state of Rajasthan. The village lies in the northern part of Rajasthan in a semi-arid region near the Thar Desert.

== Demographics ==
As per the 2011 national census, Birmi Patta recorded a total population of 751 people, including 397 males and 354 females. Children aged 0–6 years formed a small proportion of the population, and the demographic structure is similar to nearby rural settlements of the region.

== Administration ==
The village functions under the Panchayati Raj system and is administered by the Gram Panchayat Dayawath through an elected Sarpanch. It comes under the Taranagar Assembly constituency and the Churu Lok Sabha constituency.

== Transport ==
Road connectivity links the village with nearby towns and agricultural markets. The nearest railway access is Sidhmukh railway station located roughly 17 kilometres away, providing connections to regional routes.

== Economy ==
Agriculture and animal husbandry form the primary livelihood sources of residents. Most households depend on seasonal crop cultivation and livestock-based income, while some villagers engage in small trade and labour work in nearby towns.

== Religion ==
Residents traditionally follow Hindu practices and revere Gogaji, a regional folk deity of Rajasthan. The Gogaji temple at Dadrewa serves as a significant religious site for villagers during fairs and gatherings.

== Climate ==
The village experiences a semi-arid climate typical of northern Rajasthan, with hot summers and mild winters.
