= Satyun =

Satyun Satyoo
- Village
- Nickname: सात्युं
- Location in Rajasthan, India Satyun (India)
- Coordinates: 28°34′N 75°7′E
- Country: India
- State: Rajasthan
- District: Churu
- Tehsil: Taranagar

Population (2023)
  - Total: 14,590

Languages
  - Official: Hindi
  - Spoken: Hindi, Marwari, Rajasthani
- Time zone: UTC+5:30 (IST)
- PIN: 331029
- Telephone code: 01561
- ISO 3166 code: RJ-IN
- Vehicle registration: RJ-10
- Max Summer Temp: 46 °C (115 °F)
- Min Winter Temp: 1 °C (34 °F)

Satyun (Satyu) is a village of Taranagar tehsil in Churu district in Rajasthan, India.

== Location ==
This is located 48 km north-east of Churu city. It is in south east of Taranagar.

== Population ==
As of the census of 2011, there are 8,142 people. 4,183 of them are male and 3,959 are female.
