= Ghanau =

Village in Rajasthan, India

- Village
- Location in Rajasthan, India Ghanau (India)
- Coordinates: 28.45°N 75.15°E
- Country: India
- State: Rajasthan
- District: Churu district
- Tehsil: Sidhmukh

Government
  - Type: Panchayati Raj

Area
  - Total: 24.39 km^{2} (9.42 sq mi)

Population (2011)
  - Total: 3,291
  - Density: 134.9/km^{2} (349.5/sq mi)
- Time zone: UTC+5:30 (IST)
- PIN: 331023
- Vehicle registration: RJ-10

Ghanau is a village in the Sidhmukh tehsil of Churu district in the state of Rajasthan, India. It is administered by a Gram Panchayat under the Panchayati Raj system.

== Geography ==
Ghanau is located in the north-western part of Rajasthan in the Churu district, which forms part of the Shekhawati region. The village covers an area of approximately 24.39 square kilometres.

== Demographics ==
As per the 2011 Census of India, Ghanau has a population of 3,291 people, including 1,669 males and 1,622 females. The village has around 635 households.

=== Literacy ===
The literacy rate of Ghanau is approximately 71.7%, with male literacy at 82.39% and female literacy at 60.75%.

=== Social composition ===
Scheduled Castes (SC) constitute about 25.4% of the population, while Scheduled Tribes (ST) population is negligible.

== Economy ==
The economy of Ghanau is primarily based on agriculture and animal husbandry, with a large section of the population engaged in farming and related activities.

== Governance ==
Ghanau is governed by a locally elected Sarpanch under the Panchayati Raj system of India.

== Infrastructure ==
Basic facilities are available within the village, while higher education and healthcare services are accessed in nearby towns of Churu district.
