= Antilope subtorta =

Antilope subtorta Temporal range: Late Pliocene

Scientific classification
- Kingdom: Animalia
- Phylum: Chordata
- Class: Mammalia
- Order: Artiodactyla
- Family: Bovidae
- Subfamily: Antilopinae
- Genus: Antilope
- Species: †A. subtorta

Binomial name
- †Antilope subtorta Pilgrim, 1937

Extinct species of bovid

Antilope subtorta is an extinct species of antelope that lived during the Pliocene in the Siwaliks of Pakistan.

A. subtorta is considered the oldest known member of the genus. In comparison to the living blackbuck, the horns were less twisted.
