= Ratannagar =

Ratannagar Thelasar
- Town
- Nickname: Thelasahar
- Location in Rajasthan, India Ratannagar (India)
- Coordinates: 28.2298°N 74.9414°E
- Country: India
- State: Rajasthan
- District: Churu
- Founder: Kedias And Hirawats
- Named for: Ratan Singhji Maharaja of Bikaner

Population (2001)
  - Total: 11,018

Languages
  - Official: Hindi; Marwari; Shekhawati
- Time zone: UTC+5:30 (IST)
- ISO 3166 code: RJ-IN
- Vehicle registration: [RJ 10-

Ratannagar (Heritage city) is a city, near Churu city, and a municipality in Churu district in the Indian state of Rajasthan. Ratannagar is a small town in the Churu District in the State of Rajasthan, India. It is situated about 8 kilometers south of Churu and has a population of approximately 14,000 people. It is located on the Jaipur road and is famous for its havelis (private mansions). In 1982, Director J.P. Dutta made a motion picture in the village entitled "Gulami", starring Dharmendra, Mithun, Nasirudin Shah, Kulbhushan Kharbanda, Smita Patil, Anita Raj and Rina Rai. The main reason the small town was used for the month-long shooting was the noted havelis.

Ratannagar was built by Shah Nand Ram Kedia and Hirawat Family as they moved from shekhwati after some scuffle between them and the then sekhwati rulers.The maharaja of bikaner sri Ganga singhji agreed to provide the land on request by them but he put a condition that the new town to be developed by the Kedia's should be named after his son Sri Ratan singh ji.Hence Ratannagar was built in the style of Jaipur. It is known for its street layout and distinctive scenery.

City's street are strait and every street cross to each other. Ratannagar city is famous for "Ran bankuro" as like Colonel Jaisingh ji. The Hero of Longewala post in 1965 war with Pakistan.

The monumental Gaj Kesari Haveli is situated Ratannagar. This Haveli is widely known for its 1500 wall frescoes and corridors, is the residence of Judge Ram Awtar Soni and family. The Haveli was built in 1899 in all its grandeur and beauty with various architectural styles like Rajput, Shekhawati, Persian, and European Neo Classical. Many famous celebrities such as Edwina Mountbatten and H.H. Maharaja Sri Sadul Singh of Bikaner has visited the palace.

== Demographics ==
As of 2001 India census, Ratannagar had a population of 11,018. Males constitute 50% of the population and females 50%. Ratannagar has an average literacy rate of 60%, higher than the national average of 59.5%: male literacy is 72%, and female literacy is 49%. In Ratannagar, 17% of the population is under 6 years of age.
