= Bas Dhakan (Churu) =

- Village
- Location in Rajasthan, India Bas Dhakan (India)
- Coordinates: 28.402015°N 75.173055°E
- Country: India
- State: Rajasthan
- District: Churu district
- Tehsil: Churu

Government
  - Type: Panchayati Raj
  - Body: Gram Panchayat Lohsana Bara

Population (2011)
  - Total: 1,055
- Time zone: UTC+5:30 (IST)
- Vehicle registration: RJ-10

Bas Dhakan is a village in the Churu district of the Rajasthan state in India. It lies in the Shekhawati region.

== Demographics ==
According to the 2011 Census of India, Bas Dhakan has a total population of 1,055, comprising 516 males and 539 females.

== Literacy ==
As per the 2011 Census, the literacy rate of Bas Dhakan is approximately 66.95%, with male literacy at 83.22% and female literacy at 51.84%.

== Economy ==
The economy of the village is primarily based on agriculture.

== Administration ==
Bas Dhakan is governed under the Panchayati Raj system and is administered by the Gram Panchayat Lohsana Bara
