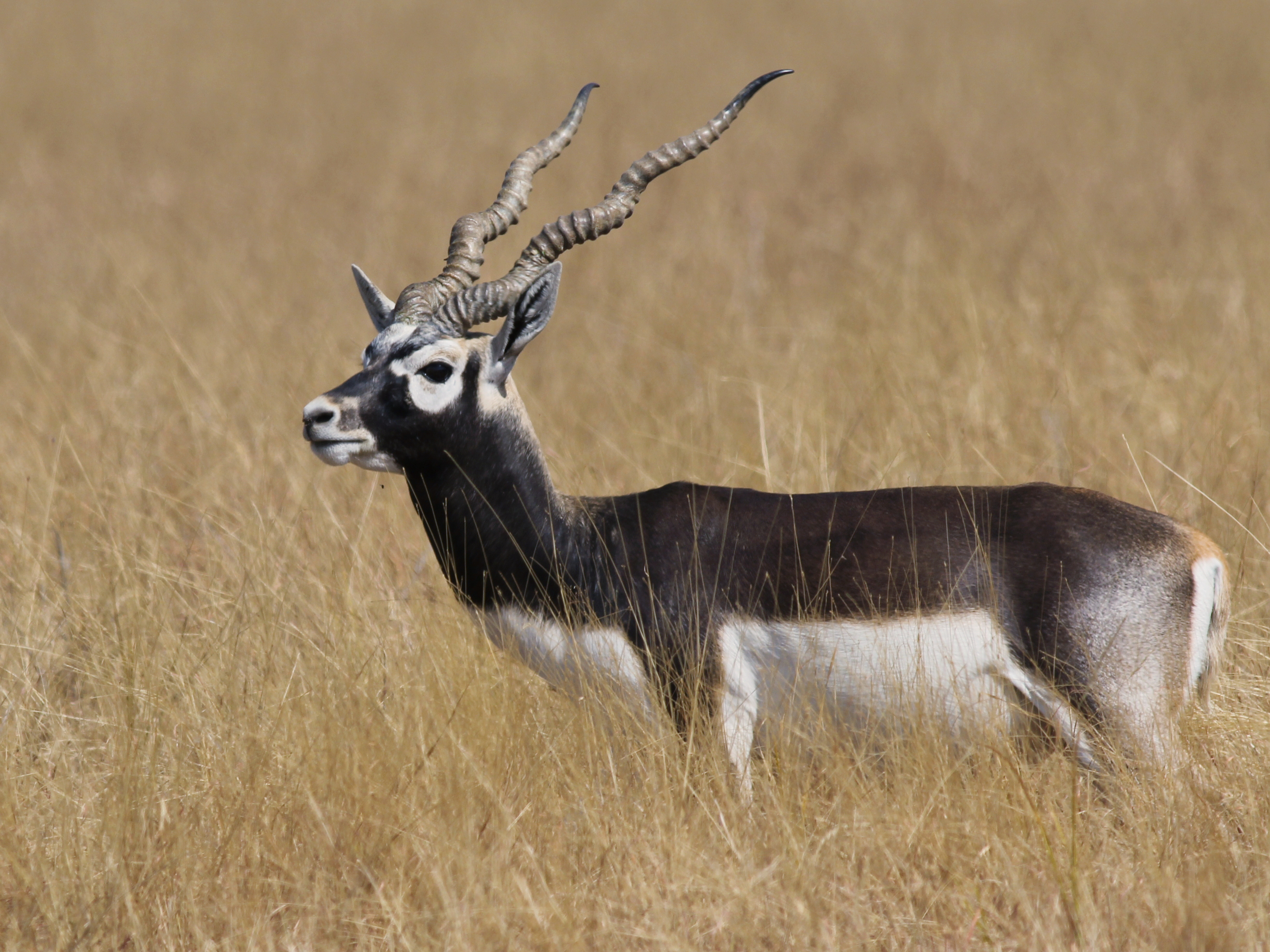
- Blackbuck (Antilope cervicapra)

Scientific classification
- Kingdom: Animalia
- Phylum: Chordata
- Class: Mammalia
- Order: Artiodactyla
- Family: Bovidae
- Subfamily: Antilopinae
- Tribe: Antilopini
- Genus: Antilope; Pallas, 1766

Type species
- Capra cervicapra Linnaeus, 1758

Species
- Antilope cervicapra; †Antilope intermedia; †Antilope subtorta

= Antilope =

Antilope Temporal range: Late Pliocene - Recent

Genus of mammals

Antilope is a genus of twisted-horn bovid that contains a single living species, the blackbuck of South Asia. Two extinct species are also known.

Many fossil antelopes were included in this genus, but have since been placed in new genera; for example the species formerly known as Antilope planicornis is now placed in its own genus, Nisidorcas.
