= Nehra =

Nehra is a Jat surname. Notable people with the surname include:

- Ashish Nehra (born 1979), Indian cricketer and coach
- Deepak Nehra (born 2003), Indian freestyle wrestler
- Jagdish Nehra (c. 1943–2023), Indian politician

== See also ==
- Neha
