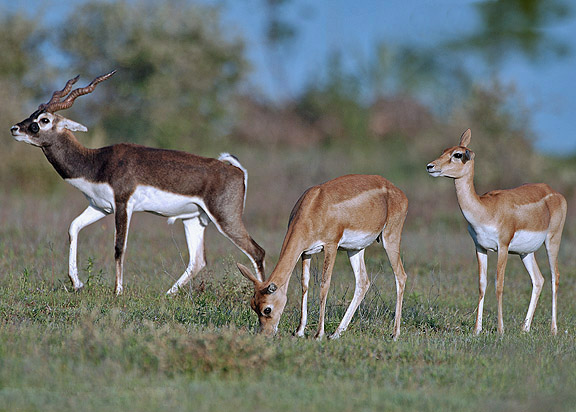
- Male and two females

Conservation status
- Least Concern (IUCN 3.1)
- CITES Appendix III

Scientific classification
- Kingdom: Animalia
- Phylum: Chordata
- Class: Mammalia
- Order: Artiodactyla
- Family: Bovidae
- Subfamily: Antilopinae
- Genus: Antilope
- Species: A. cervicapra

Binomial name
- Antilope cervicapra (Linnaeus, 1758)

Subspecies
- A. c. cervicapra (Linnaeus, 1758); A. c. rajputanae Zukowsky, 1927
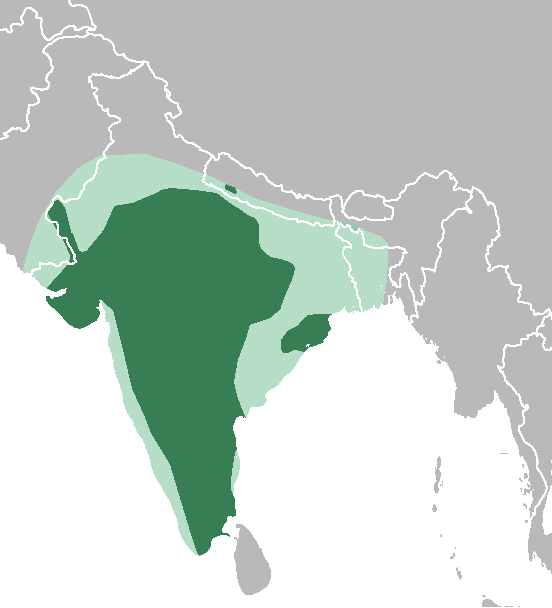

Synonyms
- Cervicapra Sparrman, 1780; Antilope bezoartica Gray, 1850; Capra cervicapra Linnaeus, 1758

= Blackbuck =

Antelope native to India and Nepal

The blackbuck (Antilope cervicapra) is a medium-sized antelope native to India and Nepal. It inhabits grassy plains and lightly forested areas with perennial water sources.

It stands up to 74–84 cm (29–33 in) high at the shoulder. Males weigh 20–57 kg (44–126 lb), with an average of 38 kg (84 lb). Females are lighter, weighing 20–33 kg (44–73 lb) or 27 kg (60 lb) on average. Males have 35–75 cm (14–30 in) long corkscrew horns, and females occasionally develop horns, as well. The white fur on the chin and around the eyes is in sharp contrast with the black stripes on the face. Both sexes' coats feature a two-tone colouration; in males, the majority of the body is dark brown to black, with white circles around the eyes, white ears and tail, and the belly, lower jaw, and inner legs also white. Females and juveniles are yellowish-fawn to tan and display the same white areas, only with more of a beige tone than the males. Females also feature a more pronounced horizontal white side-stripe, starting around the shoulder and ending at the rump. The blackbuck is the sole living member of the genus Antilope and was described by Carl Linnaeus in 1758. Two subspecies are recognized.

The blackbuck is active mainly during the day. It forms three types of small groups: female, male, and young bachelor herds. Males often adopt lekking as a strategy to garner females for mating. While other males are not allowed into these territories, females often visit these places to forage. The male can thus attempt mating with her. The blackbuck is an herbivore and grazes on low grasses, occasionally browsing as well. Females become sexually mature at the age of eight months, but mate no earlier than two years of age. Males mature later, at 1.5 years. Mating takes place throughout the year. Gestation is typically six months long, after which a single calf is born. The lifespan is typically 10 to 15 years.

The blackbuck is native to and occurs mainly in India, while it is locally extinct in Pakistan and Bangladesh. It was formerly widespread; today small and scattered herds are largely confined to protected areas. During the 20th century, blackbuck numbers declined sharply due to excessive hunting, deforestation, and habitat destruction.

The blackbuck has been introduced in Argentina, Australia and the United States, primarily on hunting ranches. In Argentina, the population is surviving well. In India, hunting of blackbuck is prohibited under Schedule I of the Wildlife Protection Act of 1972. The blackbuck has significance in Hinduism; Indian and Nepali villagers do not harm the blackbuck.

== Etymology ==
The scientific name of the blackbuck Antilope cervicapra stems from the Latin word antalopus ("horned animal"). The specific name cervicapra is composed of the Latin words cervus ("deer") and capra ("she-goat"). The vernacular name "blackbuck" is a reference to the dark brown to black colour of the dorsal part of the coat of the males. The earliest recorded use of this name dates back to 1850.

== Taxonomy and evolution ==
The blackbuck is the sole living member of the genus Antilope and is classified in the family Bovidae. The species was described and given its binomial name by Swedish zoologist Carl Linnaeus in the 10th edition of Systema Naturae in 1758. Antilope also includes fossil species, such as Antilope subtorta and Antilope intermedia.

Antilope, Eudorcas, Gazella, and Nanger form a clade within their tribe Antilopini. A 1995 study of the detailed karyotype of Antilope suggested that within this clade, Antilope is closest to the Gazella group. A 1999 phylogenetic analysis confirmed that Antilope is the closest sister taxon to Gazella, although an earlier phylogeny, proposed in 1976, placed Antilope as sister to Nanger. In a more recent revision of the phylogeny of the Antilopini on the basis of sequences from multiple nuclear and mitochondrial loci in 2013, Eva Verena Bärmann (of the University of Cambridge) and colleagues re-examined the phylogenetic relationships and found Antilope and Gazella to be sister genera distinct from the sister genera Nanger and Eudorcas.

- - - Gazella
      - - - Cuvier's gazelle
          - Rhim gazelle
        - Sand gazelle
      - - Chinkara
        - Goitered gazelle
    - - - Mountain gazelle
        - Speke's gazelle
      - Dorcas gazelle
  - Antilope
    Blackbuck

Two subspecies are recognised, although they might be independent species:

- A. c. cervicapra (Linnaeus, 1758), known as the southeastern blackbuck, occurs in southern, eastern, and central India. The white eye ring of the male is narrow above the eye and the neck is all black in the male and the white on the underside is largely restricted to the belly in both males and females. The black leg stripe is well defined and reaches all along the leg.
- A. c. rajputanae (Zukowsky, 1927), known as the northwestern blackbuck, occurs in northwestern India. Males have a grey sheen to the dark parts during the breeding season. The white on the underside extends up to half way on the sides of the body and the lower base of the neck of males is white. The white eye ring is broad all around the eye with the leg-stripe going only down to the shanks.

== Genetics ==
The blackbuck shows variation in its diploid chromosome number. Males have 31–33, while females have 30–32. Males have an XY1Y2 sex chromosome. Unusually large sex chromosomes had earlier been described only in a few species, all of which belonged to Rodentia. However, in 1968, a study found that two artiodactyls, the blackbuck and the sitatunga, too, showed this abnormality. Generally, the X chromosome constitutes 5% of the haploid chromosomal complement, but the X chromosome of the blackbuck this percentage is 14.96. Portions of both peculiarly large chromosomes show delayed replication.

A 1997 study found lower variation in blood protein polymorphism in Antilope in comparison with Antidorcas, Eudorcas, and Gazella. This was attributed to a history of rapid evolution of an autapomorphic phenotype of Antilope. This might have been aided by a particularly strong selection of a few dominant males due to their lekking behaviour.

== Characteristics ==
Adult male blackbuck

Sub-adult male blackbuck

Juvenile, at Tal Chhapar Sanctuary, India

The blackbuck has white fur on the chin and around the eyes, which is in sharp contrast with the black stripes on the face. The coats of males show two-tone colouration; while the upper parts and outsides of the legs are dark brown to black, the underparts and the insides of the legs are all white. Darkness typically increases as the male ages; females and juveniles are yellowish fawn to tan. In Texas, blackbuck moult in spring, following which the males look notably lighter, though darkness persists on the face and the legs. On the contrary, males grow darker as the breeding season approaches. Both melanism and albinism have been observed in wild blackbuck. Albino blackbuck are often zoo attractions as in the Indira Gandhi Zoological Park.

The blackbuck stands up to 74–84 cm (29–33 in) high at the shoulder; its head-to-body length is nearly 120 cm (47 in). In the population introduced to Texas, males weigh 20–57 kg (44–126 lb), an average of 38 kg (84 lb). Females are lighter, weighing 20–33 kg (44–73 lb) or 27 kg (60 lb) on average. Sexual dimorphism is prominent, as males are heavier and darker than the females. The long, ringed horns, that resemble corkscrews, are generally present only on males, though females may also develop horns. They measure 35–75 cm (14–30 in), though the maximum horn length recorded in Texas has not exceeded 58 cm (23 in). The horns diverge forming a "V"-like shape. In India, horns are longer and more divergent in specimens from the northern and western parts of the country.

Blackbuck bear a close resemblance to gazelles, and are distinguished mainly by a dark brown or black colour in the dorsal parts, whereas gazelles are brown in these parts.

== Distribution and habitat ==
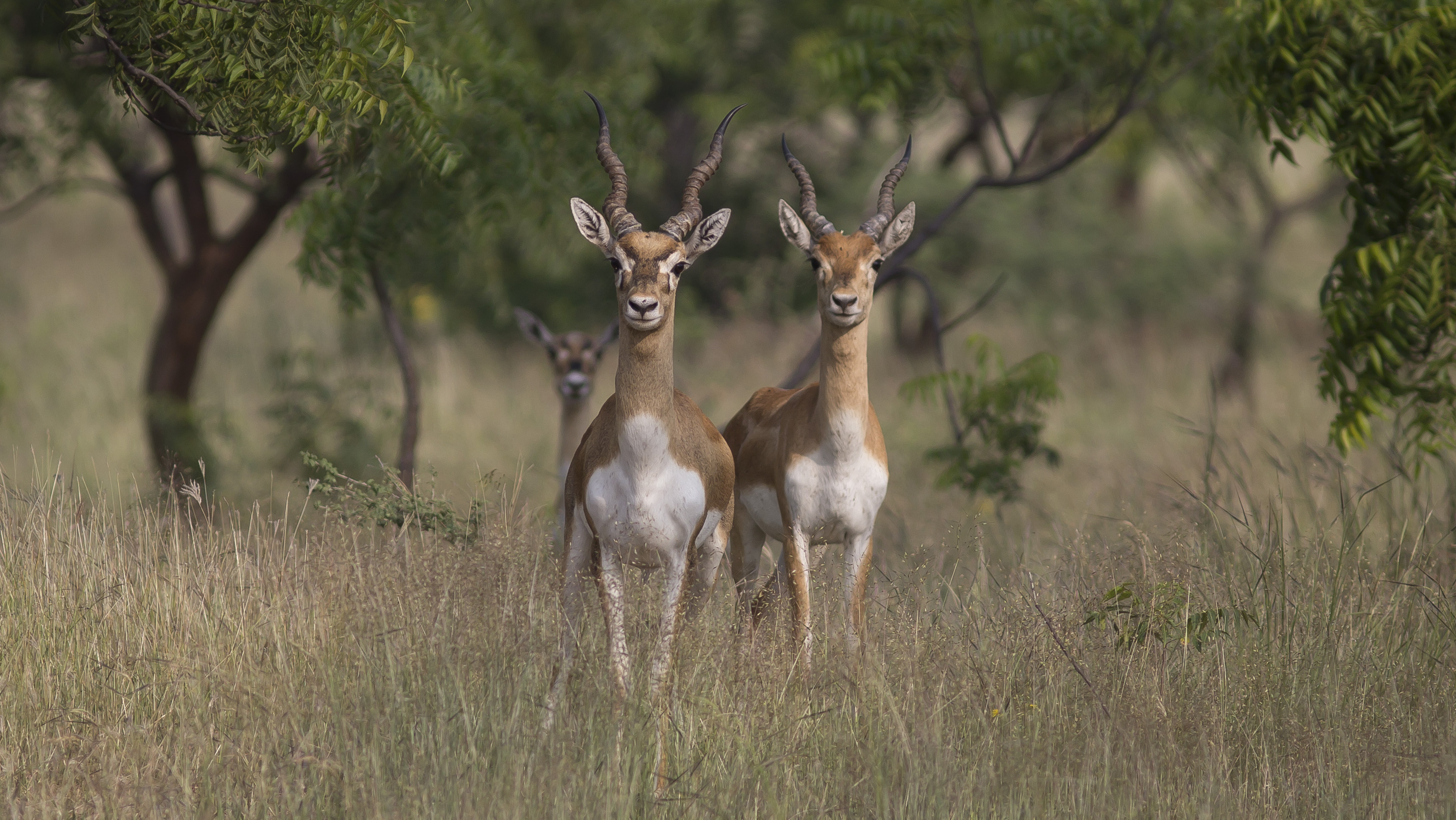
Blackbucks in Rehekuri Blackbuck Sanctuary

The blackbuck is native to the Indian subcontinent and inhabits grassy plains and thinly forested areas where perennial water sources are available for its daily need to drink. Herds travel long distances to obtain water. The British naturalist William Thomas Blanford described the range of the blackbuck in his 1891 The Fauna of British India, including Ceylon and Burma as:

India from the base of the Himalayas to the neighbourhood of Cape Comorin (the southernmost locality known to me is Point Calimere), and from the Punjab to Lower Assam, in open plains, not in Ceylon nor east of the Bay of Bengal. Not found on hills nor in thickly wooded tracts, and wanting throughout the Malabar coast south of the neighbourhood of Surat. The statement that this antelope is not found in Lower Bengal is not quite correct; none are found in the swampy Gangetic delta, but many exist on the plains near the coast in Midnapore (I have shot them near Contai), as they also do in Orissa. Antelopes are most abundant in the North-west Provinces, Rajputana, and parts of the Deccan, but are locally distributed and keep to particular tracts.

Today, small, scattered herds are largely confined to protected areas.

In southern Nepal, the last surviving blackbuck population in Blackbuck Conservation Area was estimated to comprise 184 individuals in 2008. A few blackbucks are present in the Indian Institute of Technology Madras campus.

The blackbuck is considered locally extinct in Pakistan and Bangladesh.

=== Introduced populations ===
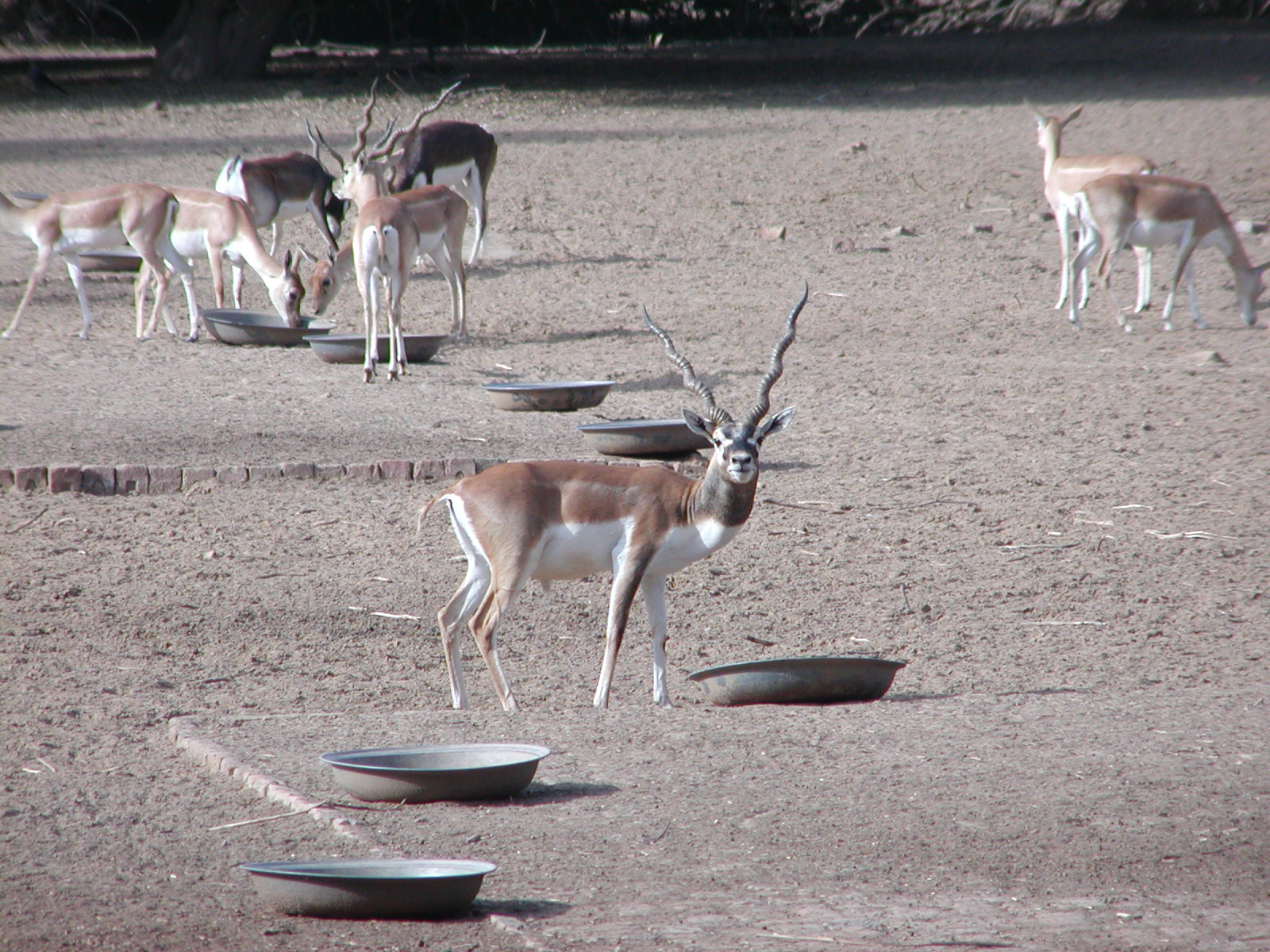
Blackbuck kept in Lal Suhanra National Park, Pakistan, to be reintroduced

The blackbuck was also introduced into Argentina, numbering about 8,600 individuals as of the early 2000s.

In the early 1900s, blackbuck were introduced to Western Australia. In either the late 1980s or the early 1990s, they were also introduced to Cape York in Far North Queensland, although the population was subsequently eradicated. In 2013, an antelope that appeared to be a blackbuck was sighted at Kakadu National Park in the Northern Territory. In 2015, a blackbuck was sighted near Warrnambool, Victoria, which was later captured and sent to Mansfield Zoo. The blackbuck is a declared pest in Queensland and Western Australia. In Victoria, blackbuck and American bison are considered both "regulated pest animals" and livestock.

The antelope was introduced in Texas in the Edwards Plateau in 1932. By 1988, the population had increased and the antelope was the most populous exotic animal in Texas after the chital.

== Ecology and behaviour ==
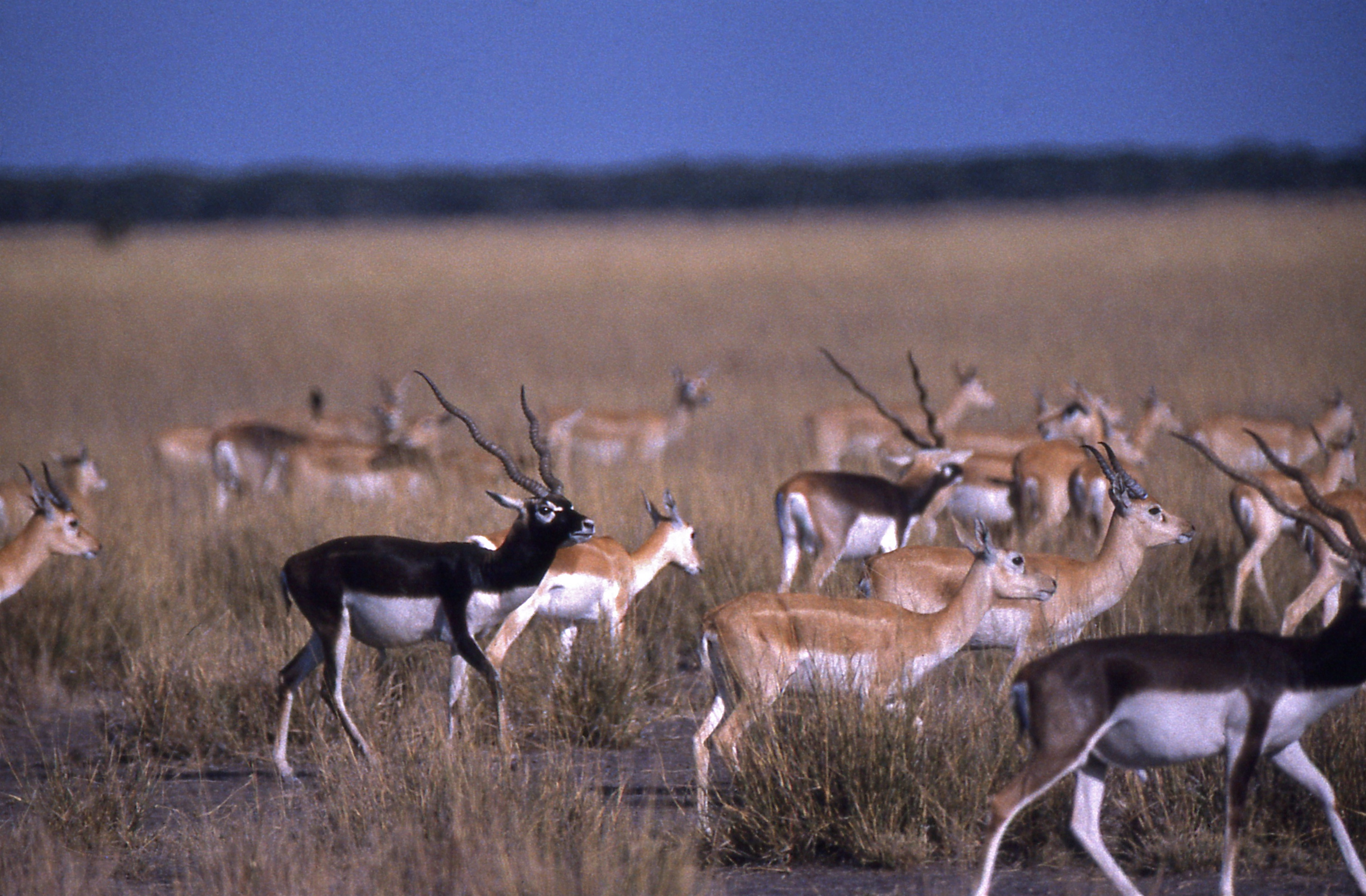
Blackbuck herd in Gujarat

The blackbuck is a diurnal antelope, though is less active at noon when summer temperatures rise. It can run at a speed of 80 km/h (50 mph).

Group size fluctuates and seems to depend on the availability of forage and the nature of the habitat. Large herds have an edge over smaller ones in that danger can be detected faster, though individual vigilance is lower in the former. Large herds spend more time feeding than small herds. A disadvantage for large herds, however, is that traveling requires more resources. Herd size reduces in summer.

Males often adopt lekking as a strategy on the part of males to garner females for mating. Territories are established by males on the basis of the local distribution of female groups, which in turn is determined by the habitat, so as to ensure greater access to females. The males actively defend resources in their territories, nearly 1.2 to 12 hectares (3.0 to 29.7 acres; 0.0046 to 0.0463 sq mi) in size; territories are marked with scent using preorbital gland and interdigital gland secretions, faeces and urine. While other males are not allowed into these territories, females are allowed to visit these places to forage. The male can attempt mating with visiting females. Lekking is a demanding strategy, as the males often have to bear injuries – thus it is a tactic typically adopted by strong, dominant males. Males may either defend their mates or try to forcibly copulate with them. Weaker males, who may not be dominant, might choose the second method.

The blackbuck is severely affected by natural calamities such as floods and droughts, from which it can take as long as five years to recover. The wolf is a major predator. Old rutting bulls might be especially vulnerable prey. The golden jackal hunts juveniles. Village dogs are reported to kill fawns, but are unlikely to successfully hunt and kill adults.

Blackbucks in Great Indian Bustard Sanctuary show flexible habitat use as the resources and risks change seasonally in the landscape. They use small patches in the area of about 3 km^{2} (1.2 sq mi). Human activities strongly influenced the movement of herds, but the presence of small refuges allowed them to persist in the landscape.

=== Diet ===
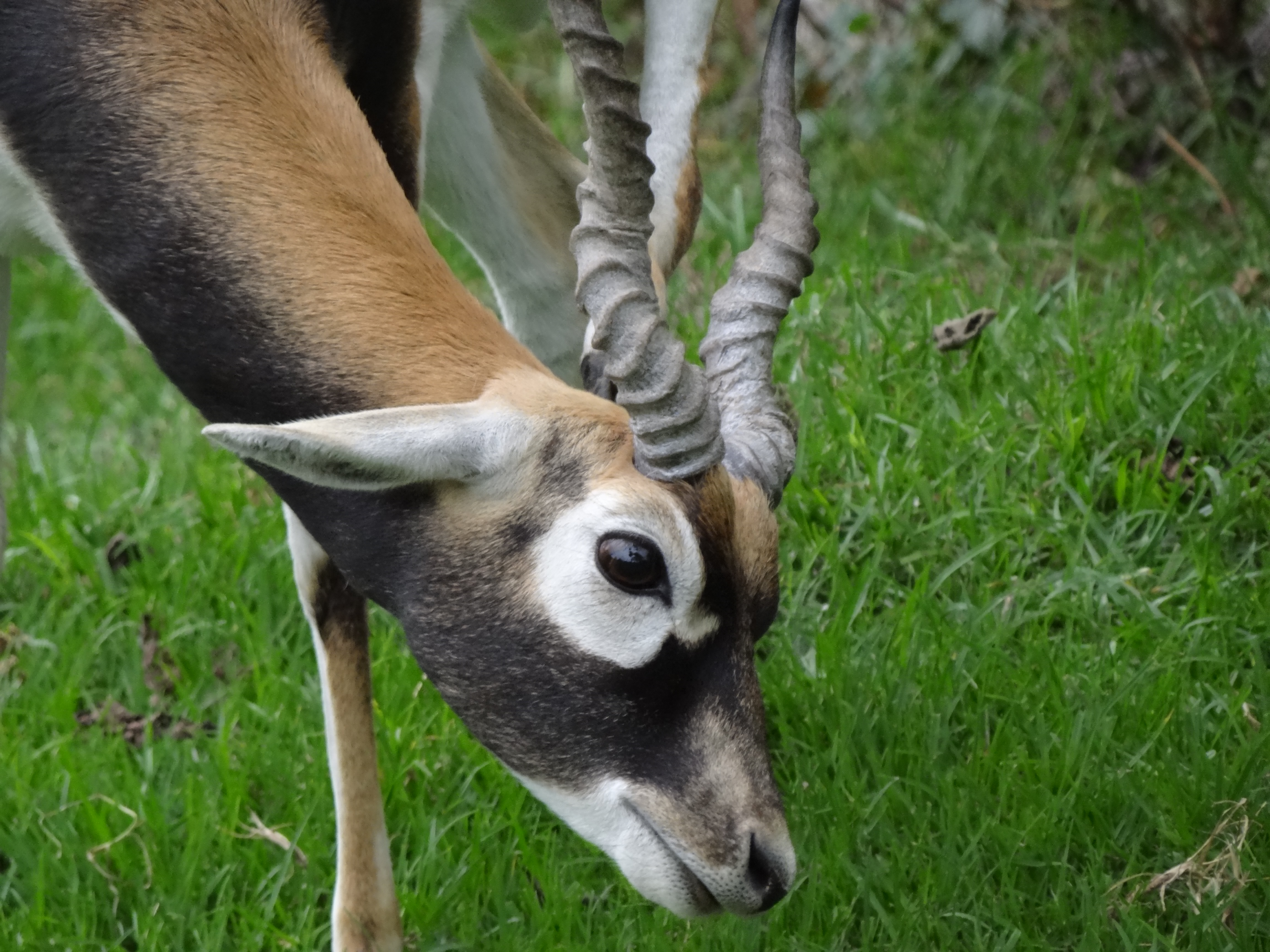
Blackbuck prefer grass

The blackbuck is a herbivore and grazes on low grasses, occasionally browsing as well. It prefers sedges, fall witchgrass, mesquite, and live oak and was occasionally observed browsing on acacia trees in the Cholistan Desert. Oats and berseem were found to be palatable and nutritious to captive populations. In Velavadar Black Buck Sanctuary, Dichanthium annulatum comprised 35% of the diet. Digestion of nutrients, especially crude proteins, was poor in summer, but more efficient in the rainy and winter seasons. Crude protein intake in summer was very low, even below the recommended value. Blackbuck consumed less food in summer than in winter, and often foraged on the fruits of Prosopis juliflora. Prosopis becomes a significant food item if grasses are scarce. Water is a daily requirement of the blackbuck.

=== Reproduction ===
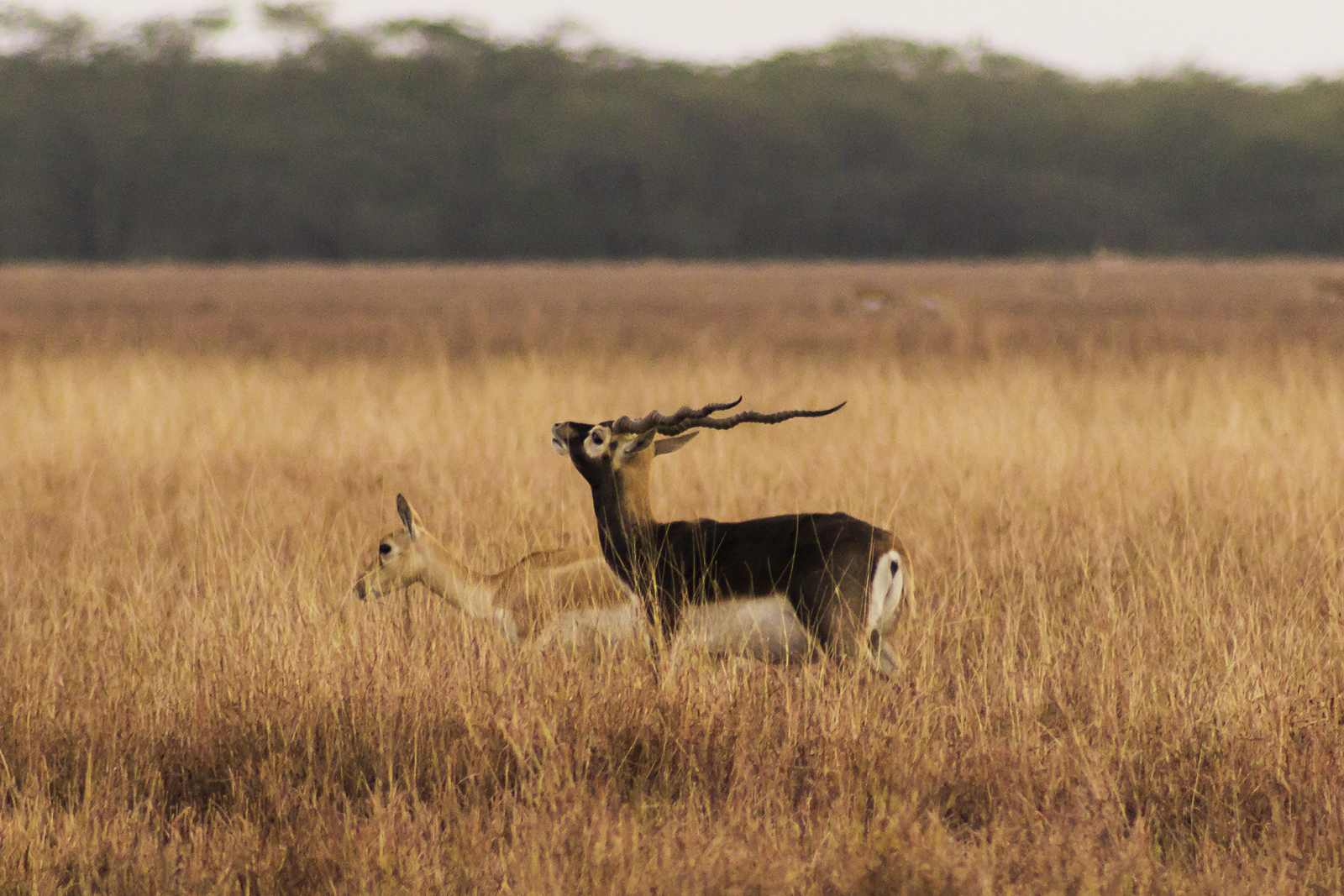
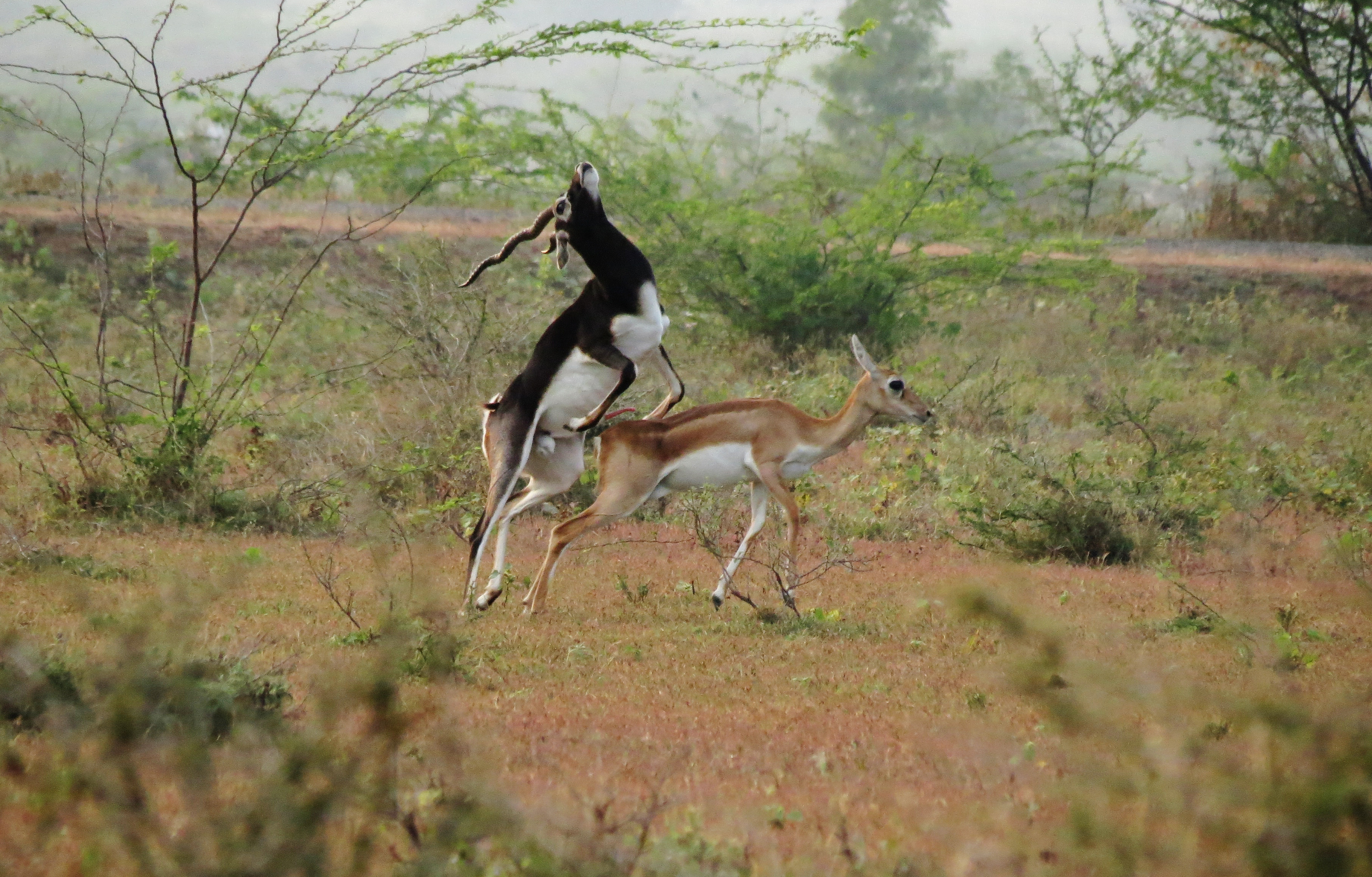
Courtship display and copulation of blackbuck

Females become sexually mature at the age of eight months, but mate no earlier than two years. Males mature at the age of one-and-a-half years. Mating takes place throughout the year; peaks occur during spring and fall in Texas. Two peaks have been observed in India: from August to October and from March to April. Rutting males aggressively establish and defend their territories from other males, giving out loud grunts and engaging in serious head-to-head fights, pushing each other using horns. Aggressive display consists of thrusting the neck forward and raising it, folding the ears and raising the tail. The dominant male pursues the female with his nose pointing upward, smells her urine and shows a flehmen response. The female shows her receptivity by waving her tail and thumping the hindlegs on the ground. This is followed by several mounting attempts, and copulation. The whole process may last as long as six hours. The female will remain still for some time after copulation, following which she may start grazing. The male may then move on to mate with another female.

Gestation typically lasts six months, after which a single calf is born. Newborns are a light yellow; infant males may have a black patch on the head and the neck. Young are precocial, they can stand on their own soon after birth. Females can mate again after a month of parturition. Juveniles remain active and playful throughout the day. Juvenile males turn black gradually, darkening notably after the third year. The lifespan is typically 10 to 15 years.

== Threats ==
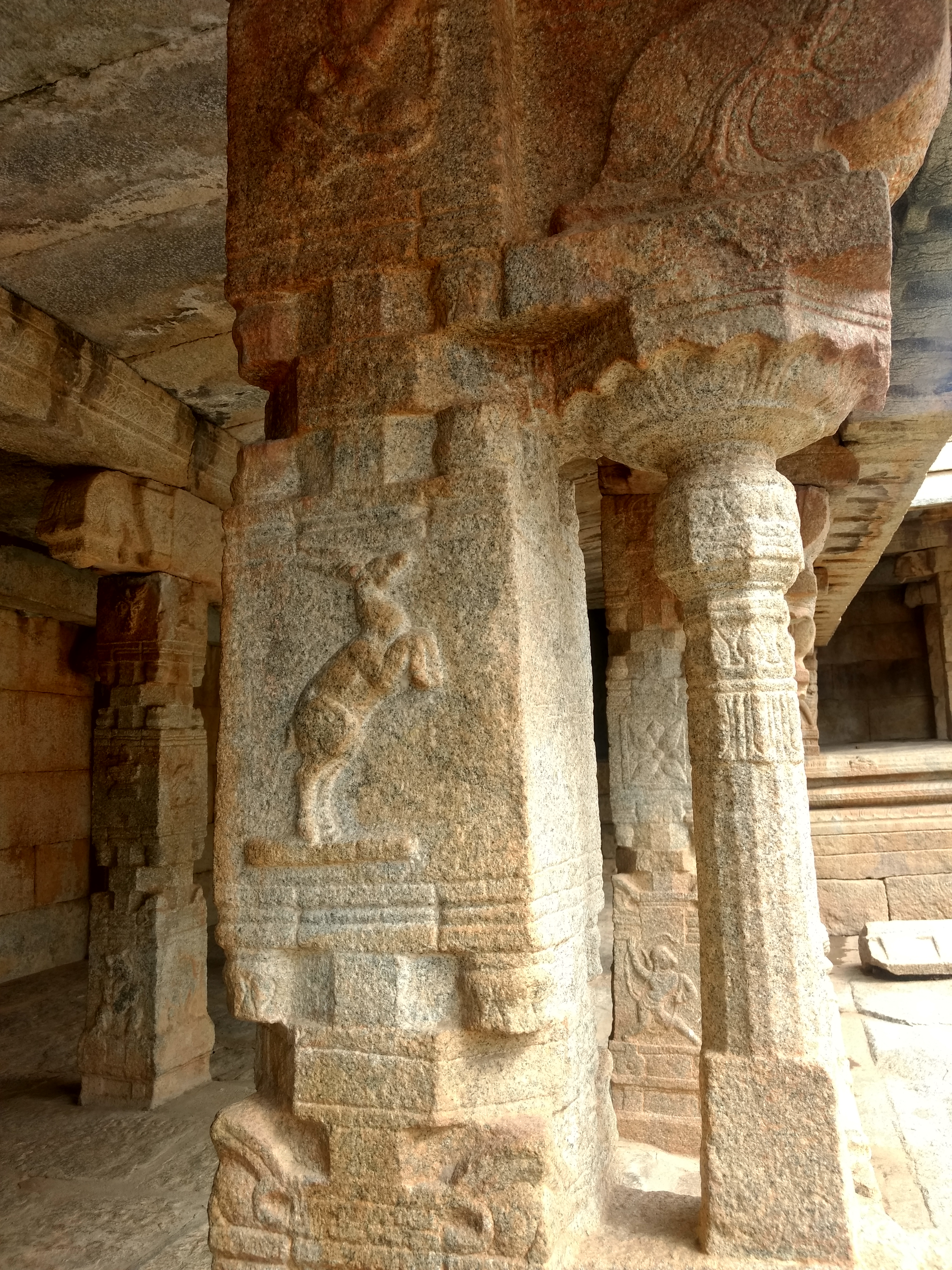
Blackbuck carved on temple pillar at Lepakshi (16th century)

During the 20th century, blackbuck numbers declined sharply due to excessive hunting, deforestation and habitat degradation. Some blackbucks are killed illegally especially where the species is sympatric with nilgai.

Until India's independence in 1947, blackbuck and chinkara were hunted in many princely states with specially trained captive Asiatic cheetahs. By the 1970s, blackbuck was locally extinct in several areas.

== Conservation ==
The blackbuck is listed under Appendix III of CITES. In India, hunting of blackbuck is prohibited under Schedule I of the Wildlife Protection Act of 1972. It inhabits several protected areas of India, including

- in Gujarat: Velavadar National Park, Gir Forest National Park;
- in Maharashtra: Great Indian Bustard Sanctuary;
- in Madhya Pradesh: Kanha National Park
- in Rajasthan: Tal Chhapar Sanctuary, National Chambal Sanctuary, Ranthambhore National Park
- in Karnataka: Ranibennur Blackbuck Sanctuary;
- in Tamil Nadu: Point Calimere Wildlife and Bird Sanctuary, Vallanadu Wildlife Sanctuary, Guindy National Park.
- in Punjab: Abohar Wildlife Sanctuary

A captive population is maintained in Pakistan's Lal Suhanra National Park.

== In culture ==
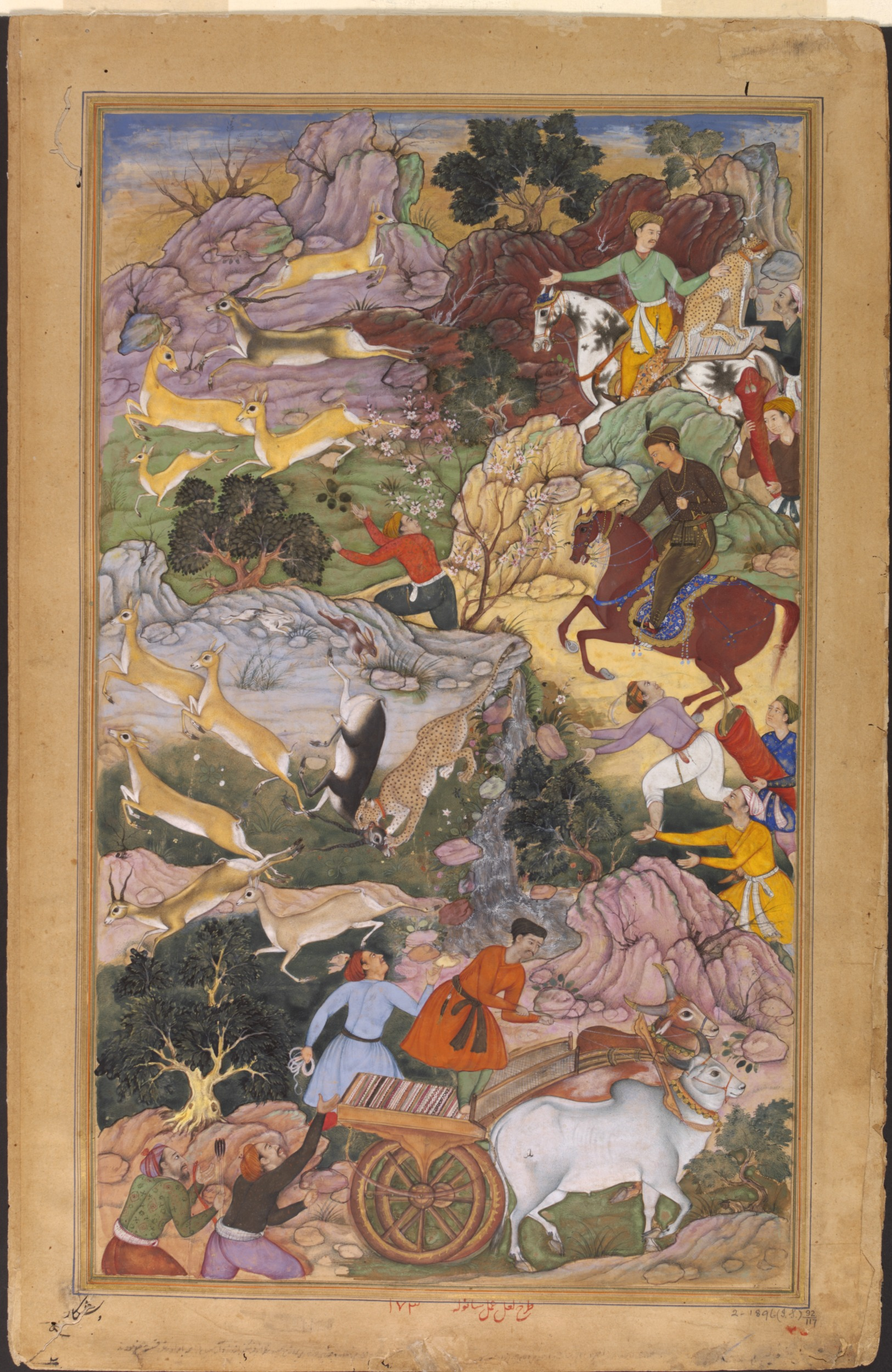
Akbar hunting blackbuck (Akbarnama, c.1590––5)

The blackbuck has associations with the Indian culture. The antelope might have been a source of food in the Indus Valley civilisation (3300–1700 BCE); bone remains have been discovered in sites such as Dholavira and Mehrgarh. The blackbuck is routinely depicted in miniature paintings of the Mughal era of 16th to 19th centuries depicting royal hunts often using cheetahs. Villagers in India and Nepal generally do not harm the blackbuck. Tribes such as the Bishnois revere and care for most animals including the blackbuck.

The blackbuck is mentioned in Sanskrit texts as the Kṛṣṇamṛga. According to Hindu mythology, it draws the chariot of Lord Krishna. The blackbuck is considered to be the vehicle of the wind god Vayu, the divine drink Soma and the moon god Chandra. In Tamil Nadu, the blackbuck is considered to be the vehicle of the Hindu goddess Korravai. In Rajasthan, the goddess Karni Mata is believed to protect the blackbuck.

In the Yājñavalkya Smṛti, Sage Yagyavalkya is quoted stating "in what country there is black antelope, in that Dharma must be known", which is interpreted to mean that certain religious practices including sacrifices were not to be performed where blackbuck did not roam.

The hide of the blackbuck is deemed to be sacred in Hinduism. According to the scriptures, it is to be sat upon only by Brahmin priests, sadhus and yogis, forest-dwellers and bhikshu mendicants. Blackbuck meat is highly regarded in Texas. In an analysis, blackbuck milk was found to have 6.9% protein, 9.3% fat, and 4.3% lactose.

In some agricultural areas in northern India, the blackbuck are found in large numbers and raid crop fields. However, the damage caused by blackbuck is far lower than that caused by the nilgai.

In 2018, Bollywood actor Salman Khan was sentenced to five years imprisonment for poaching a blackbuck in 1998.

== See also ==
- Barasingha
- Sambar deer
