= Tal Chhapar Sanctuary =

Protected area in Rajasthan, India

- IUCN category IV (habitat/species management area)
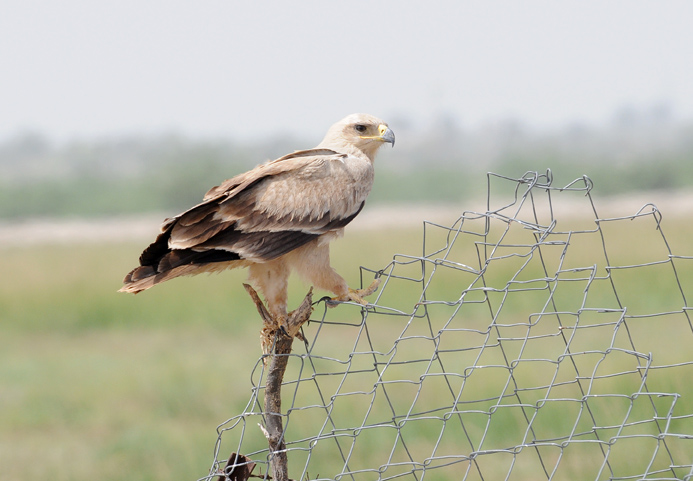
- Tawny eagle at Tal Chhapar Sanctuary

- Location within Rajasthan
- Interactive map of Tal Chhapar Sanctuary
- Location: Churu District, Rajasthan, India
- Nearest city: Chhapar
- Coordinates: 27°47′53″N 74°26′06″E
- Established: 1971
- Governing body: Government of Rajasthan

Tal Chhapar Sanctuary is a wildlife sanctuary in the Churu district of northwestern Rajasthan, in the Shekhawati region of India. It is known for blackbucks and is also home to a variety of birds. It is situated on the fringe of the Great Indian Desert and between Ratangarh and Sujangarh on the Nokha-Sujangarh state highway.

== Geography ==
Tal Chhapar Sanctuary is a flat saline depression locally known as a "tal" that has a unique ecosystem in the heart of the Thar Desert. It is at an elevation of 302 m (991 ft) and covers 719 ha (7.19 km^{2}). It has open grassland with scattered Acacia and Prosopis trees which give it an appearance of a typical savanna.

== Flora and fauna ==
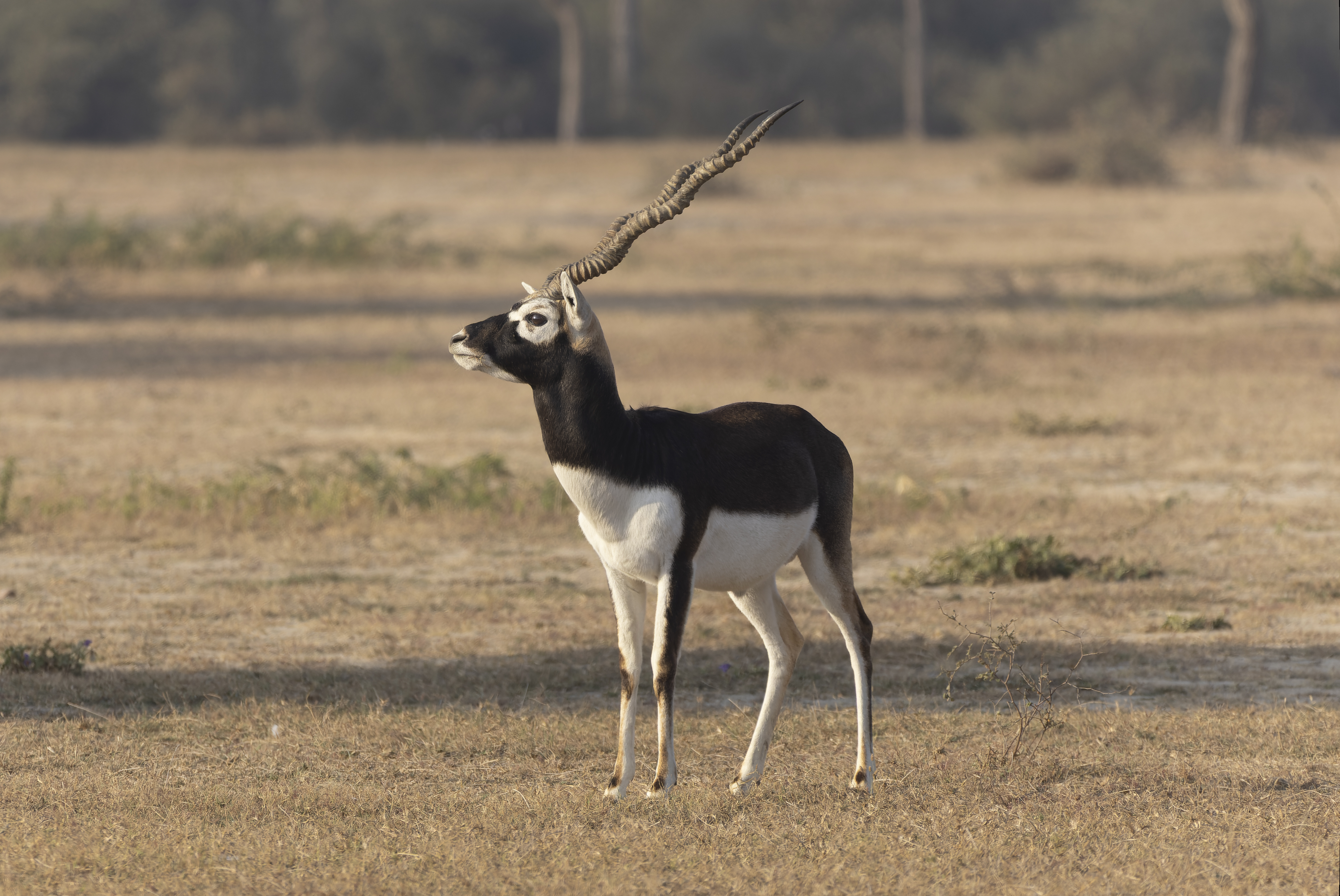
Blackbuck (Antilope cervicapra)

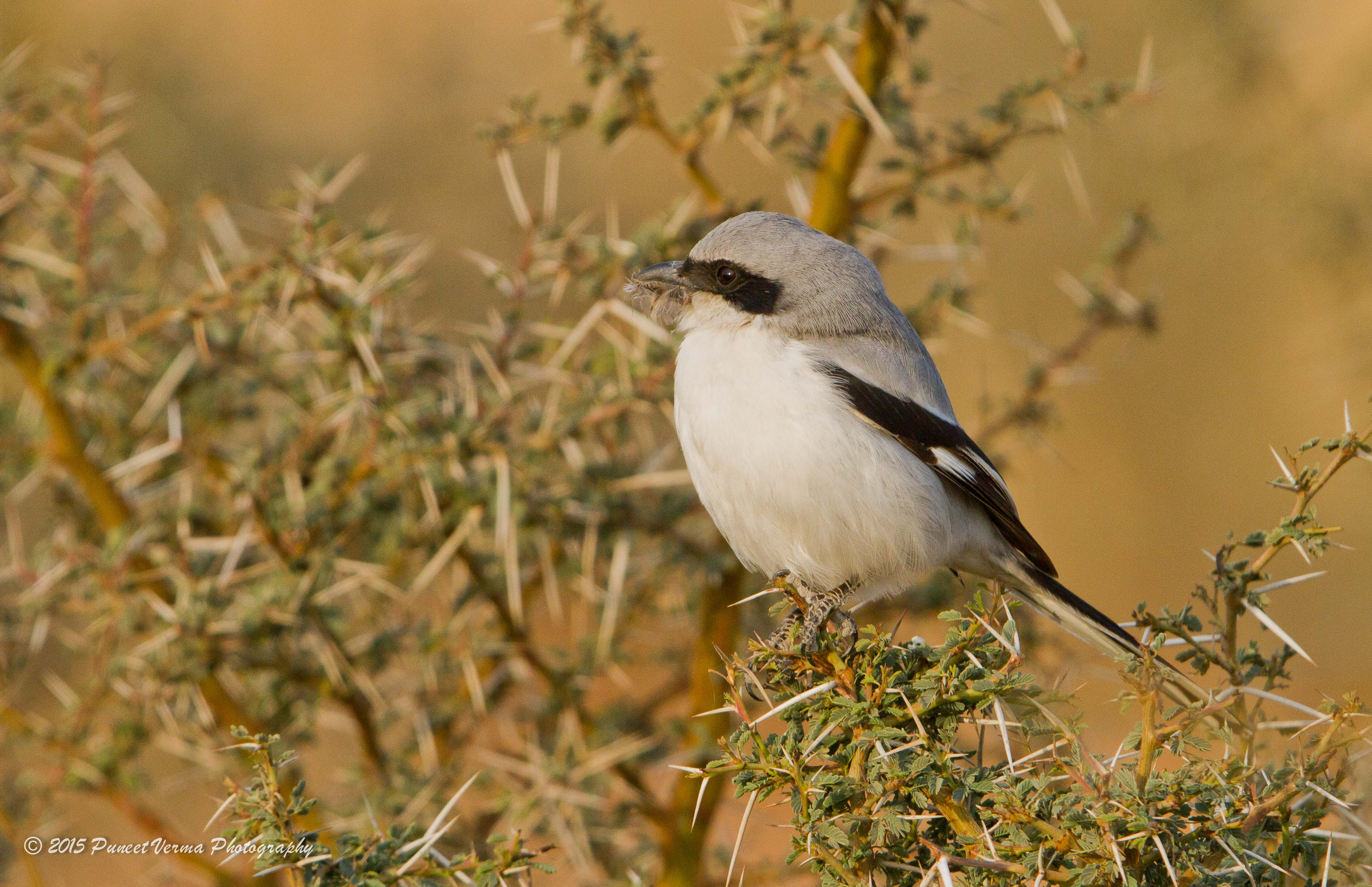
Southern grey shrike

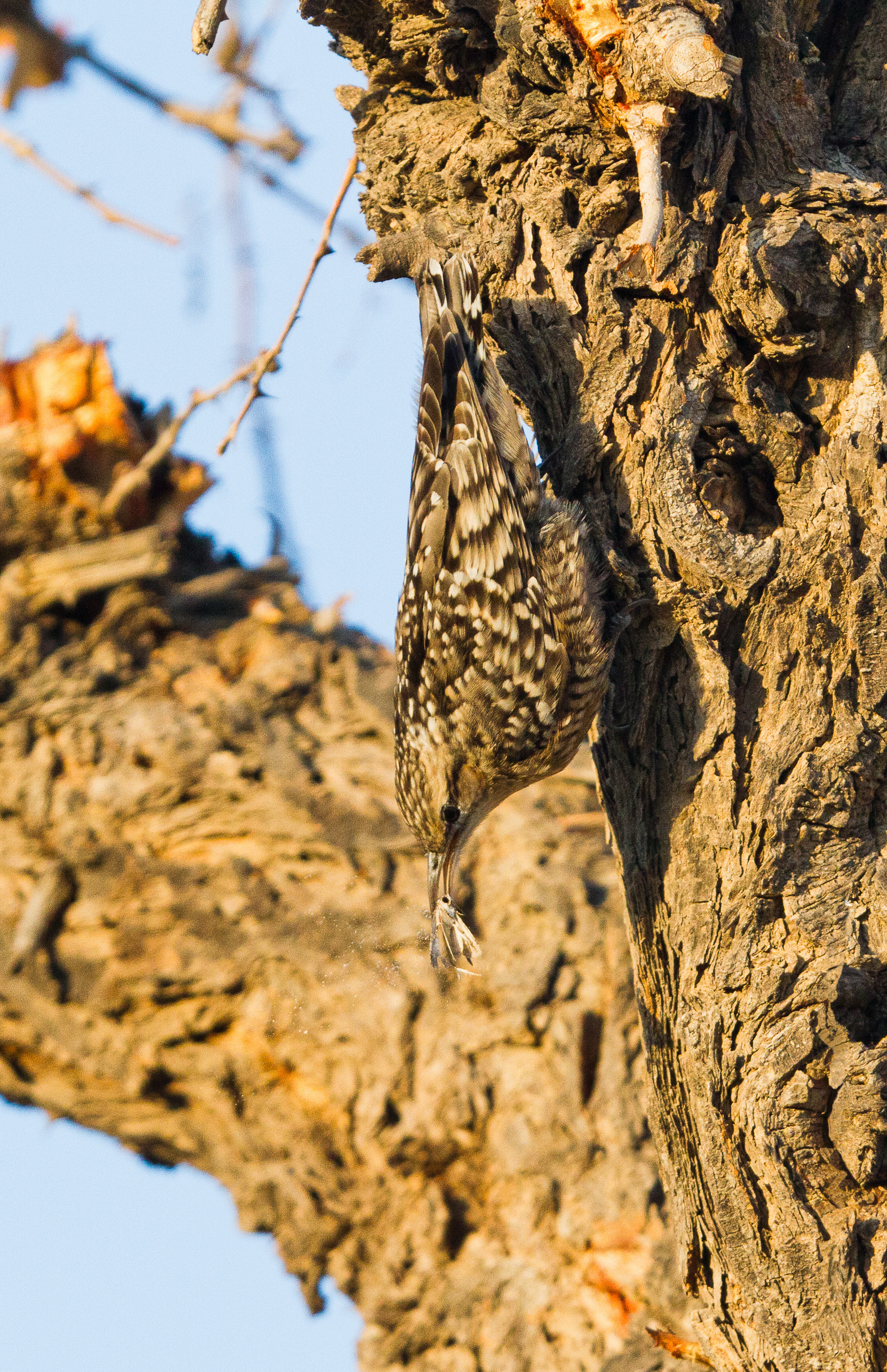
Indian spotted creeper feeding

Tal Chhapar Sanctuary lies on the passageway of many migratory birds, which pass through this area in September and stay until March. These include eastern imperial eagle, tawny eagle, short-toed eagle, cream-coloured courser, Old World sparrows, little green bee-eater, black ibis and demoiselle crane. Resident birds include the skylark, crested lark, Eurasian collared dove and brown doves.

== Climate ==
This region is characterized by a distinct winter (from October to February), summer (March to June) and monsoon (July to September). The zone has a dry climate with a large variation in temperature, wind blows south – west during summer. In May and June winds become very hot and that is called "loo". The maximum temperature reaches up to 48 °C (118 °F) in June and the minimum temperature falls to 10 °C (50 °F) in December – January. The Tal Chhapar Zone comes under the principal arid zone of the country. Rainfall in this region is highly erratic. There is a large variation in mean annual rainfall in this region. The average rainfall in this region ranges between 300 and 450 mm.

== See also ==
- Arid Forest Research Institute
