= Rajgarh, Kota =

Rajgarh
- village
- Location in Rajasthan, India Rajgarh (India)
- Coordinates: 25.098°N 76.211°E
- Country: India
- State: Rajasthan
- District: Kota

Government
  - Body: Gram panchayat
- Elevation: 256 m (840 ft)

Population (2001)
  - Total: 1,600

Languages
  - Official: Hindi
- Time zone: UTC+5:30 (IST)
- Postal code: 325202
- ISO 3166 code: RJ-IN
- Website: www.rajgarh.weebly.com

Rajgarh is a village in Sangod in Kota district in the Indian state of Rajasthan.

== Government ==
The village is represented by an elected sarpanch (head of village).

== Geography ==
Rajgarh is located on the Paravan riverside. It was a historical village known as Tikana Rajgarh of Kota Reyasat.

== Demographics ==
The village population is 1781 in 344 households, of which 927 are males while 854 are females as per the 2011 census.

Children age 0-6 number 256 or 14.37%. The average sex ratio is 921, lower than the state average of 928. The child sex ratio is 1098, higher than Rajasthan average of 888.

The village has a literacy rate of 72% compared to 66% average in Rajasthan. The male literacy stands at 85%, while female literacy rate was 58%.

Selected data
Category	Total	Male	Female
Schedule Caste	701	378	323
Schedule Tribe	73	37	36
Literacy	72.39%	84.97%	58.33%
Total Workers	802	516	286
Main Worker	352	0	0
Marginal Worker	450	193	257

== Religious sites ==
=== Kulama Balaji ===
Kulama Balaji is the ancient temple of lord Hanuman. It is a main religious center for Hindus from Kota, Bundi, Baran and Jhalawad.

=== 8-Pillared Cenotaph ===
The 8 Pillared Cenotaph is a chhatri that is located on the Paravan riverside.

=== Rata Devi ===
Rata Devi is an ancient Hindu temple that is situated in Sorsan Grasslands near Rajgarh village.

This temple is in the runnel side of a rivulet known as “Rata Daha” in Arean (local) language, that flows towards Paravan River at a distance of 500 meters from Rata Devi temple.

he Paravan River and Rata Daha (rivulet) meeting place attract birds and other animals to drink, mostly deer of Sorsan Wildlife Sanctuary.
