= Amarpura =

- Village
- Location in Rajasthan, India Amarpura (India)
- Coordinates: 28.564°N 75.222°E
- Country: India
- State: Rajasthan
- District: Churu

Languages
  - Official: Hindi
- Time zone: UTC+5:30 (IST)
- ISO 3166 code: RJ-IN
- Vehicle registration: RJ-
- Climate: Warm (Köppen)

Amarpura is a village in Rajgarh tehsil of Churu district in Rajasthan, India.

== Location ==
It is situated 24 km northeast of Rajgarh city. Its neighbouring villages are Ratanpura, Bhuwari, Chimanpura, Mundibadi and Baas Radsana.

== Population ==
As of the census of 2011, there were 1790 inhabitants, 935 male and 855 female.
