= Bidasar, Churu =

Bidasar
- Location in Rajasthan, India Bidasar (India)
- Coordinates: 27.83°N 74.3°E
- Country: India
- State: Rajasthan
- District: Churu

Government
  - Type: self
- Elevation: 304 m (997 ft)

Population (2019)
  - Total: 100,000+

Languages
  - Official: Hindi Bagri
- Time zone: UTC+5:30 (IST)
- PIN: 331501

Bidasar is a city and a municipality in Churu district in the state of Rajasthan, India. Bidasar is named after Bidawat Rathores, who descended from Rao Bida, son of Rao Jodha, and brother of Rao Bika, the founder of Bikaner.

== Geography ==
Bidasar- is located at 27.83°N 74.3°E. It has an average elevation of 304 metres (997 feet). The area is also very sandy and extremely rocky.

== Demographics ==
As of 2001 India census, Bidasar had a population of 30,103. Males constitute 52% of the population and females 48%. Bidasar has an average literacy rate of 45%, lower than the national average of 59.5%; with male literacy of 56% and female literacy of 34%. 19% of the population is under 6 years of age.
