= Antilope intermedia =

Antilope intermedia Temporal range: Late Pliocene

Scientific classification
- Domain: Eukaryota
- Kingdom: Animalia
- Phylum: Chordata
- Class: Mammalia
- Order: Artiodactyla
- Family: Bovidae
- Subfamily: Antilopinae
- Tribe: Antilopini
- Genus: Antilope
- Species: †A. intermedia

Binomial name
- †Antilope intermedia Khan & Akhtar, 2014

Extinct species of mammal

Antilope intermedia is an extinct species of Antilope that lived during the Piacenzian stage of the Pliocene epoch.

== Distribution ==
Antilope intermedia is known from the Tatrot Formation of Pakistan.
