= Sidhmukh =

Town in Rajasthan, India

- Town and Tehsil headquarters
- Location in Rajasthan, India Sidhmukh (India)
- Coordinates: 28.95°N 75.46°E
- Country: India
- State: Rajasthan
- District: Churu

Population (2011)
  - Total: 7,767
- Time zone: UTC+5:30 (IST)
- Vehicle registration: RJ-10

Sidhmukh is a town and the administrative headquarters of Sidhmukh tehsil in Churu district in the Indian state of Rajasthan, India. It functions as an important administrative and service centre for surrounding rural areas of northern Rajasthan.

== History ==
Sidhmukh historically formed part of the Bikaner region in the princely state and gradually evolved into a tehsil centre under the Rajasthan state administrative system.

== Administration ==
Sidhmukh serves as the headquarters of Sidhmukh tehsil under the Churu district administration of the Government of Rajasthan.

== Demographics ==
According to the 2011 Census of India, Sidhmukh had a population of 7,767, including 4,056 males and 3,711 females. The literacy rate was 68.93%, with male literacy at 79.39% and female literacy at 57.69%. Scheduled Castes constituted 22.27% of the population and Scheduled Tribes 0.13%.

== Geography ==
Sidhmukh lies in the semi-arid region of northern Rajasthan and experiences hot summers and moderate winters typical of the Thar desert fringe.

== Transport ==
Sidhmukh is connected by district and state highways with neighbouring towns including the district headquarters of Churu, located approximately 93 km away by road.

The town is served by Sidhmukh railway station (station code: SDMK) under the North Western Railway zone of Indian Railways, providing regional rail connectivity.

== Education ==
Educational institutions in Sidhmukh operate under the Rajasthan School Education Department.

Shrimati Shakuntala Devi Government College, Sidhmukh, established in 2022, provides undergraduate education and is affiliated with Maharaja Ganga Singh University, Bikaner.

== Politics ==
Sidhmukh falls under the Sadulpur Assembly constituency of the Rajasthan Legislative Assembly. It is part of the Churu Lok Sabha constituency for parliamentary elections.

== Economy ==
The local economy is primarily agrarian, supported by agricultural markets and small-scale trade activities, as reflected in Rajasthan’s official Economic Review reports.

== Villages ==
The Sidhmukh tehsil of Churu district comprises several villages. Some of the notable villages under the tehsil include:

- Birmi Khalsa
- Malwas
- Birmi Patta
- Ghanau
- Tamba Kheri
