= Ratanpura =

- Census town
- Location in Uttar Pradesh, India Ratanpura (India)
- Coordinates: 25.920971°N 83.744665°E
- Country: India
- State: Uttar Pradesh
- District: Mau

Population (2011)
  - Total: 4,405

Languages
  - Official: Hindi and Urdu
- Time zone: UTC+5:30 (IST)
- PIN: 221706
- Vehicle registration: UP54
- Website: up.gov.in

Ratanpura is a census town in the Mau district of Uttar Pradesh. It is located about 25 kilometres east of the district headquarters, Mau, and 47 Kilometres west of Ballia. It is a development block headquarter, which comes under the Mau Sadar Tehsil. The town is situated between the middle of Mau and Ballia. The State Highway 34 (famely known as Rajdhani Road, as it connects Eastern U.P. with the State Capital Lucknow) passes through Ratanpura. Earlier it was a part of Ballia district, but since 19 November 1988 it became the part of newly constituted Mau District. The town has its own Railway station managed by North Eastern Railway (India) in its name which has connecting trains to Mau, Varanasi, Ballia, Lucknow, Kanpur, Azamgarh, Chhapra and Dhanbad stations to name a few.

== Demographics ==
At the 2011 India census, Ratanpura had a population of 4,405 of which 2,263 were males and 2,142 females. Ratanpura had an average literacy rate of 83.00%, higher than the state average of 67.68%, with 89.71% of the males and 76.04% of females literate. 14.14% of the population was under 6 years of age.

== Language ==
Common spoken languages are Bhojpuri and Hindi.

The Bhojpuri dialect is distinct in its own way, when compared to its neighbouring districts of Ballia and Ghazipur

== Education ==
There are many Primary and secondary schools and one college in the village.

1. Nehru Inter College
2. Government Primary School (known locally as Baratar primary school)
3. Dayanand Intermediate College (nearby)

Institute for Higher studies includes:

1. Mariyada Purushottam Post Graduate College, Bhimpura Road (2-3 km north from Ratanpura)

== Landmarks ==
The irst water park of Mau district has been constructed in Ratanpura, called Funtasia Waterpark and Resort. It is expected that it will enhance the development of the village.
