= Sidhmukh railway station =

Indian railway station

Sidhmukh सिद्धमुख

General information
- Location: Sidhmukh, Churu district, Rajasthan, India; India
- Coordinates: 28.893536°N 75.290728°E
- Elevation: 203 m (666 ft)
- System: Indian Railways station
- Owner: Indian Railways
- Operator: North Western Railway
- Line: Bikaner–Rewari line
- Platforms: 2
- Tracks: 2

Construction
- Structure type: Standard (on-ground station)
Location

Sidhmukh railway station (station code: SDMK) is a railway station located in Sidhmukh town in Churu district of the Indian state of Rajasthan. The station is operated by the North Western Railway zone of Indian Railways.

== Location ==
The railway station serves Sidhmukh town and surrounding rural areas in Churu district. It lies on the Bikaner–Rewari line, an important railway route connecting Rajasthan with the neighbouring state of Haryana.

== Station details ==
Sidhmukh railway station falls under the Bikaner railway division of the North Western Railway zone. The station has two platforms and basic passenger facilities.

The station is located at an elevation of approximately 203 metres above sea level.

== Train services ==
Several passenger trains stop at Sidhmukh railway station, providing connectivity to nearby cities such as Bikaner, Rewari and Hisar.

Train schedules and additional information about services at the station are available through railway information portals.

== See also ==
- Sidhmukh
- Bikaner–Rewari line
- North Western Railway zone
- Indian Railways
