= Taranagar =

Taranagar Reni (Star City)
- City
- Taranagar in Churu district, Rajasthan

- Location in Rajasthan, India Taranagar (India)
- Coordinates: 28°40′8″N 75°2′26″E
- Country: India
- State: Rajasthan
- District: Churu
- Elevation: 232 m (761 ft)

Population (2011)
  - Total: 32,640

Languages
  - Official: Hindi, English
  - Regional: Bagri
- Time zone: UTC+5:30 (IST)
- PIN: 331304
- Telephone code: 1561
- ISO 3166 code: RJ-IN
- Vehicle registration: RJ-10

Taranagar is a city and a municipality in Churu district in the Indian state of Rajasthan, situated at 28° 41'N 75° 3'E, about 28 miles south of Churu City. Taranagar was earlier known as Reni, named for the lady Rinkali who came here to live from Vishalnagar Koyalapatan, currently Foga in Sardarshar (Rajasthan). Reni was the headquarters of the nizamat and the tehsil of the same name in the state of Bikaner in Rajputana. The nizamat consisted of five eastern tehsils of Bhadra, Churu, Nohar, Rajgarh and Reni. In 1948, the town was renamed for King Tara Singh, who ruled it in the mid-18th century.

== Places of interest and importance ==
Taranagar is well known for its antiquity. It has a famous Jain temple built-in 942. It has very old statues of Jain Tirthankars. The Chhatri of Anand Singhji and Tara Singhji, or saints' homes, are quite popular. These are 2 km distant from the town.

A temple, a little away from the town, is known as Shyam Pandia. It is said to be as old as Dvapara Yuga. As the legend goes, it is believed that Bhima of The Mahabharata fame was sent here to call for the services or blessings of the then pujari of the temple, Saint Shyam Pandia, for the Tilak ceremony of Yudhishthira after the Battle of Kurukshetra was won by Pandavas.

Apart from private hospitals and practicing doctors, Taranagar has a referral hospital set up by late Onkar Mal Mintri and run by the state government where health care facilities are available for the general public and for the people from nearby villages. There is another hospital building that has been converted into a veterinary hospital catering to cattle.

Though the town does not have a railway station, it is well connected by road. It is served by roadway organization of many states, private buses, and taxi operators. Gandhi Upwan, in the east of the town, close to the bus stand and police station, is a moderate garden maintained by the municipality. There is a rest-house used by visiting officials that is run by Rajasthan state PWD. The same locality houses the famous Govt. Higher Secondary School, Taranagar.

A public library in Taranagar also houses a free reading room.

Since last decade or so Taranagar has been emerging as a place counted in its vicinity of its surrounding villages — for providing facilities for children's education, selling their produce, shopping, trade, institutional interaction, etc. Besides the Main Bazar that is in the center of town, there are a number of shop-clusters or markets specializing in merchandise like footwear, vegetables and fruits, medicines etc. There are some trading firms, bank branches, organizations, government offices. Almost a dozen institutions impart graduate courses including an upcoming veterinary medical college providing the feel of a self-sufficient town. Taranagar boasts an industrial estate promoted by RIICO primarily for the manufacture of plaster of Paris.

== Nearby cities and villages ==
Sadulpur (also known as Rajgarh, its connecting railway station), a junction on the Northern Zone of Indian Railways is on east side at a distance of about 36 km and Churu, the district city is on its south side at a distance of about 60 km while Sardarsahar is on its south-west side. Apart from these cities, the town is surrounded by a large number of villages (124 )on all sides that are populated by mostly by small to medium-sized land holders, farmers and artisans. The town of Taranagar is used by them as a Mandi for selling their agricultural product as also a center for education, health services and connectivity. The nearby villages include Dhani- kumharan, Satyu, Rajpura, Lunas, Gajuwas, Chalkoi, Kharatwas, Nethawa, Togawas, Bhaleri, Bhanin, Kalwas, Dabri Chhoti, Dheerwas Bara, Sahwa, Bain, Buchawas, Dadrewa, Jigsana, Nyangli, Hadiyal, Dudhwa Khara, Bhamara etc. Brahmanwasi is an agricultural locality situated on the western side of the town. The main crops raised in the area are millets, bajra, guar, gram and lately even mustard.

== Geography ==
Taranagar is located at 28.68°N 75.03°E. It has an average elevation of 232 meters (761 feet). A part of Thar desert, it experiences extremities of climate both in summer and in the winter, that are however considered good for build-up of immunities, for general health.

Town is located in the tehsil by the same name, under the Rajgarh subdivision of the Churu district. Historically, even the city of Churu used to be a part of Taranagar Tehsil. The town grew with its Mohallas (or localities) earmarked for different castes (that is to say known by caste names) that are even today referred to for the ease of practical identification but is officially now divided into different numerical wards for the postal, election or voting purposes.

== Demographics ==
As of 2011 India Census, Taranagar had a population of 211,831 out of which the urban population is 32,640 while the rural population is 179,191. Males constitute 52% of the population and females 48%. Taranagar has an average literacy rate of 57.06%, lower than the national average of 59.5%: male literacy is 66.85%, and female literacy is 46.45%. 18% of the population is under 6 years of age. Despite its moderate size, the town boasts of the cosmopolitan nature of its populace that comprises a diversity of castes, creeds, religions and regional inhabitants as also its diaspora spread over the various nooks and corners of different states of the country as also abroad. The composition of this diaspora is also quite varied and comprises industrialists, traders, businessmen, professionals, social workers and others. One person from the town, Late Sri Ram Krishna Sarawagi (son of a reputed disciple of Mahatma Gandhi late Sri Tulsiram Sarawagi) rose to become a minister in the state of West Bengal in the 1970s. Shree Shivraj Singh Kavia's in laws house is located near Shree Karani ji temple in this city.

== Language ==
Taranagar tehsil is well known for its Bagri language, a dialect of Rajasthani language which is spoken by the majority of the people.

While, Hindi and english are official language for government of Rajasthan.

== Industry ==
Taranagar is known for its plaster of Paris industry, wooden items handicraft, jewelry, and education. Students of the nearby districts and tehsils are coming here to get a better and qualitative education from its educational institutions.
