= Churu district =

Coordinates: 28°17′24″N 74°57′36″E

- District of Rajasthan
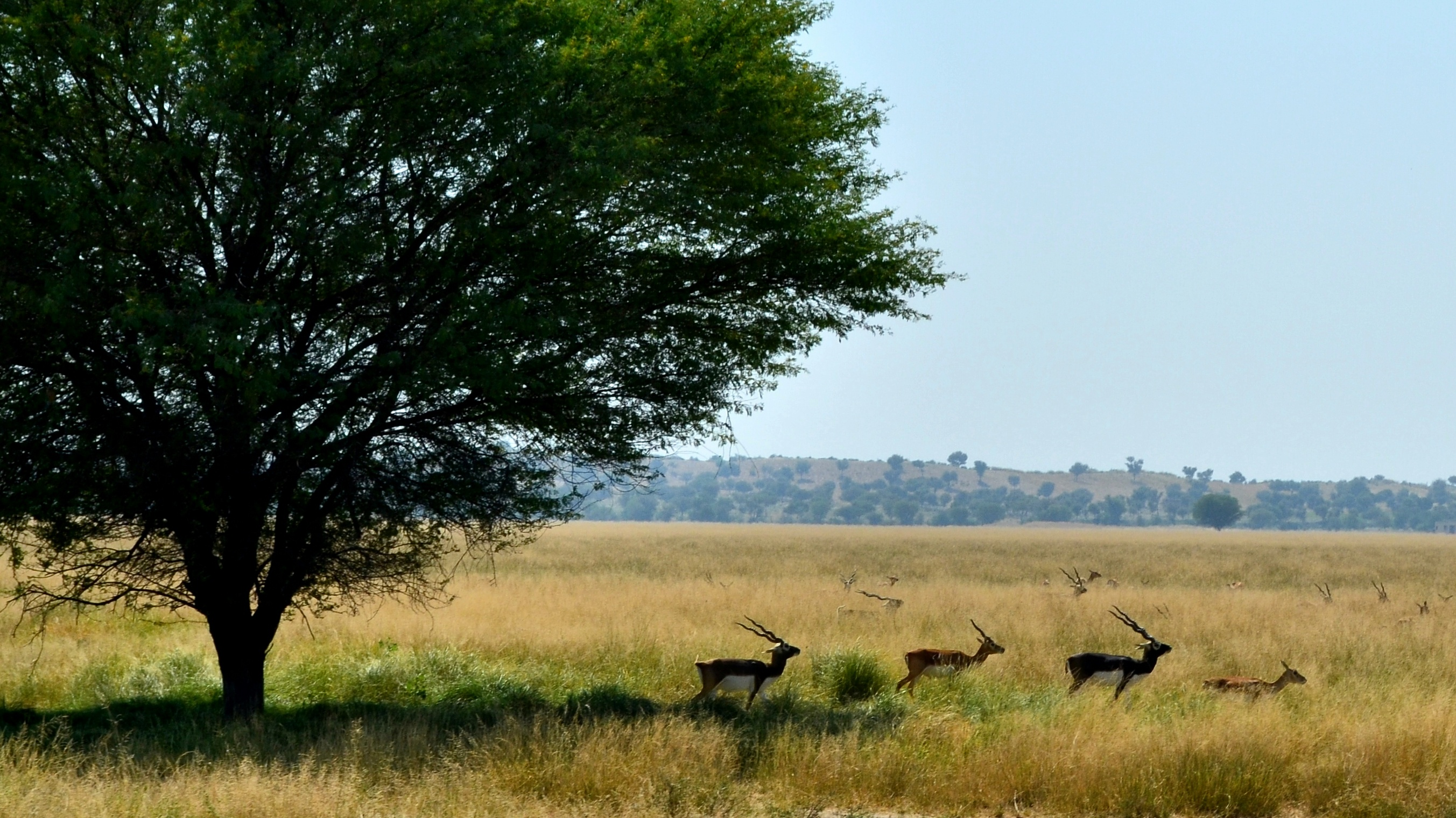
- Blackbucks at Tal Chhapar sanctuary

- Location of Churu district in Rajasthan
- Country: India
- State: Rajasthan
- Division: Sikar
- Headquarters: Churu
- Tehsils: Churu, Sidhmukh, Ratangarh, Taranagar, Rajgarh, Sardarshahar, Sujangarh, Bidasar

Government
  - Divisional Commissioner: Vandana Singhavi, IAS
  - District Collector & Magistrate: Abhishek Surana, IAS
  - Superintendent of Police: Jai Yadav, IPS

Area
  - Total: 13,858 km^{2} (5,351 sq mi)

Population
  - Total: 2,039,547
  - Density: 147.17/km^{2} (381.18/sq mi)
  - Urban: 576,235

Demographics
  - Literacy: ▲67.46%
  - Sex ratio: 940

Languages
  - Official: Hindi, English
- Time zone: UTC+05:30 (IST)
- Major highways: NH-52
- Average annual precipitation: 43cm mm
- Website: Churu District

Churu district is a district of the northern Indian state of Rajasthan. Churu lies in the Sekhawati region of northern Rajasthan and shares boundaries with the Hanumangarh District to the north, the Haryana state to the east, the Jhunjhunu and Sikar districts to the southeast, the Nagaur District to the south, and the Bikaner District to the west.

The district has an area of approximately 16,830 km^{2}, with a road length of 1901 km. As of 2011, the population of the district was approximately 2,039,547. The gender ratio is 938 females per 1,000 males; literacy among residents is 67.46%. There are 8 tehsils in the district: Churu, Sidhmukh, Ratangarh, Taranagar, Rajgarh, Sardarshahar, Sujangarh, Bidasar. The major crops include bajra and guar.

== Attractions ==
Sujangarh to the south, Ratangarh to the southwest, Sardarshahar to the north, Taranagar to the northeast, Rajgarh to the east, Ratannagar, Chapper, Bidasar and Rajaldesar are some of the major towns in the district. The Tal Chhapar Sanctuary, a blackbuck sanctuary, has more than 1,680 black bucks and migratory birds. It is a major attraction for wildlife enthusiasts. Other attractions include the grand palatial Havelies in the towns of Ratannagar, Ratangarh and Sardarshahar, the Hanuman temple at Salasar and the Venkateshwar temple at Sujangarh, the birthplace of local deity, Gogaji, in Dadrewa. The Bhadrakali Temple at Rajaldesar is popular among Shakta Tantra followers from all over India. The Baba Phool Nath Temple at Nawa, Rajgarh is popular and related to the Nath community.

== Demographics ==
Historical population
Year	Pop.	±% p.a.
1901	234,165	—
1911	269,411	+1.41%
1921	269,157	−0.01%
1931	329,062	+2.03%
1941	409,890	+2.22%
1951	471,279	+1.41%
1961	592,209	+2.31%
1971	782,149	+2.82%
1981	1,054,415	+3.03%
1991	1,373,150	+2.68%
2001	1,696,039	+2.13%
2011	2,039,547	+1.86%

Religions in Churu district (2011)
Religion	Percent
Hinduism	87.17%
Islam	12.24%
Other or not stated	0.59%

According to the 2011 census, Churu district has a population of approximately 2,039,547, roughly equal to the nation of Botswana or the US state of New Mexico. This gives it a ranking of 224th in India (out of a total of 640 districts). The district has a population density of 148 inhabitants per square kilometre (380/sq mi). Its population growth rate over the decade 2001-11 was approximately 6.1%. Churu has a sex ratio of 938 females for every 1000 males, and a literacy rate of about 67.46%. 28.25% of the population lives in urban areas. Scheduled Castes and Scheduled Tribes make up 22.15% and 0.55% of the population respectively.

=== Languages ===
Languages of Churu district (2011)
1. Rajasthani (94.6%)
2. Marwari (2.86%)
3. Hindi (1.48%)
4. Others (1.10%)

At the time of the 2011 census, 94.56% of the population spoke Rajasthani, 2.86% Marwari and 1.48% Hindi as their first language.

=== Percentage distribution of local work force ===
- Cultivators: 73.17%
- Agricultural labourers: 3.16%

=== Local industries ===
- Processing, servicing, and repairs: 2.26%
- Other workers: 21.41%

=== Major crop production ===
- Wheat: 60,654 tonnes
- Rapeseed and Mustard: 24,705 tonnes
- Pulses: 9,594 tonnes
- Gram: 316 tonnes
- Bajra: 2545467 tonnes

=== Communication facilities ===
- Public call offices: 682
- Post offices: 392
- Telegraph offices: 89
- Telephone exchanges: 83

=== Educational facilities and institutions ===
- Primary and middle schools: 1,472
- Secondary and higher secondary schools: 207
- Private BED Colleges: 14
- Post graduate and under graduate: 11
- ITIs: 5
- Government BED Colleges: 1
- IASE Deemed University
- Jawahar Navodaya Vidyalaya
- Pandit Deendayal Upadhyaya Medical College

=== Industrial scenario ===
- Large and Medium Scale Units: 10
- Small Scale Units: 3,963
- Industrial Areas: 7

== Infrastructure ==
A majority of the district's power supply is provided by the Bhakra Hydel Complex through 132 kV lines coming via Hissar in Haryana. 902 of the district's 926 villages have access to electricity. Water is available at the depth of 30 to 48 metres, with the exception of places such as Sujangarh and Taranagar Tehsils.

The district has good connections within and outside the state. Mega Highway (Bathinda-Ajmer) National Highway Nos. 11 (Agra-Bikaner), 65 (Ambala-Pali), and 709 Ext. (Rohtak-Rajgarh) pass through the district. The total length of roads in the district is 3,010 km and is 240 km from Delhi via Hisar and 210 km. via Behal. The Churu district is served by broad gauge lines of the Northern-Western Railway. The total length of rail line is 363 km. The broad gauge is operational in the district. The nearest airport is at Jaipur (approximately 245 km outside the district).

=== Primary industries ===
- Aluminium utensils
- Blanket weaving
- Cement production
- Churan
- Chatni
- Guargum
- Hand loomed cloth
- Iron and steel fabrication
- Oil production
- Salt production
- Sewing machine (DABLA)
- Heart of Desert

== Notable people ==
- Khemchand Prakash- one of the best music composers of the 1940s.
- Nand Kishore Chaudhary - chairman and managing director of Jaipur Rugs and social entrepreneur.
- Lakshmi Mittal - the "Steel King", born at Sadulpur in Churu District.
- Bimal Jalan - former RBI governor
- Bharat Vyas - Writer of the prayer song, ‘Ae Malik Tere Bande Hum’ and 'Ye Kaun Chitrakar Hai'. He directed a Bollywood film Rangeela Rajasthani.
- Col. Thakur Kishan Singh Rathore - one of the first recipients of the Maha Vir Chakra (MVC) (second highest military decoration in India)
- Devendra Jhajharia - India's first Paralympic gold medalist. On 2 March 2024, he was announced as the BJP candidate for the 2024 Indian general election from the Churu constituency in Rajasthan.
- Kanhaiyalal Sethia- prominent Rajasthani writer.
- Rai Bahadur Bhagwandas Bagla- the first Marwari Shekhawati millionaire
- Rahul Kaswan - He is an Indian politician, who first became a Member of parliament (MP) from Churu parliamentary constituency as a candidate of ruling Bharatiya Janata Party (BJP) party in Sixteenth Lok Sabha in 2014 Indian general election, and then again in 2019 Indian general election in the Seventeenth Lok Sabha . A month before 2024 general elections, he joined Indian National Congress (INC). In 2024 General Parliamentary Constituency Election, he won again from Churu Lok Sabha constituency with a margin of 72,737 Votes.
- Krishna Poonia is an international gold-medalist Indian discus thrower, track-and-field athlete and politician from the Congress party.

== See also ==
- Churu (Lok Sabha constituency)
- Birmi Patta
- Birmi Khalsa
- Gugalwa
- Ratangarh
- Ratannagar
- Sadulpur
- Sardarshahar
- Bidasar
- Bas Dhakan (Churu)
- List of villages in Churu district
- Sujangarh
- Sandwa
- Tal Chhapar Sanctuary
- Rajaldesar
- Taranagar
- Sidhmukh
- Malwas
- Ghanau
- Ratanpura, Churu district
- Dokwa
- Dudhwa Khara
