= Qaim Khan =

Ameer of the Delhi Sultanate

Khan-e Jehan Nawab Qaim Khan Shaheed who was the son of Raja Motay Rao Chauhan, the ruler of Dorayra or Dadrewa (presently situated in the Churu District of Rajasthan). The first progenitor of Qaimkhanis was Karamchand born in the family of Moterao of Chauhan clan, the ruler of Dadrewa. Firuz Shah Tughluq converted him to Islam and named him Qaimkhan. Thus his descendants were called Qaimkhani. He embraced Islam along with his brothers, Nawab Zainuddin Khan and Nawab Jabaruddin Khan, in the times of Sultan Feroz Shah (born in 1310 CE and crowned in 1351 CE). Descendants of Nawab Zainuddin Khan and Nawab Jabaruddin Khan are also 'Qaim Khanis'.

Nawab Qaim Khan was an Ameer of the Delhi Sultanate. Tuzk-e-Mehboobia of Sultan-e-Deccan Mir Mehboob Ali Khan mentions:

"Nawab Qaim Khan embraced Islam in 754 Hijra. In 760 Hijra, Sultan Feroz Shah appointed him the Governor of Hisar Ferozah with the title of Khan-e-Jehan".

The above indicates he converted to Islam in about 1352. Nawab Qaim Khan continued as the Governor of Hisar in the times of Sultan Mehmood Shah Tughlaq and Khizar Khan. Khizar defeated Daulat Khan Lodi and imprisoned him under Nawab Qaim Khan at Hisar Ferozah. (It is the same Daulat Khan Lodi who was at the helms of the Delhi Sultanate for one year and three months).

Khizar Khan then developed differences with Nawab Qaim Khan. Khizar Khan was on a military campaign when he received the information that Ameers Qaim Khan, Ikhtiar Khan, and all remnants belonging to the household of Sultan Mehmood Shah Tughlaq were planning to dethrone him. Khizar Khan left the campaign and while going back to Delhi, invited with deceit Nawab Qaim Khan and others at a meeting held at the banks of Jumna and murdered them all on 20th Jamadi-ul-Awal, 822 Hijra,

Tareekh-e-Farishta and Tarik-e-Tabqat-e-Akbari also corroborate this incident. It appears that Nawab's body was then thrown in the river Jumna as his burial place is not given in the history books.

== Ancestry ==
Nawab Qaim Khan had two brothers Nawab Zainudin Khan Nawab Jabeerudin Khan and six sons, named Muhammad Khan, Taj Khan, Quttab Khan, Mohan Khan, Ikhtiar Khan, and Wahid Khan. During the life of the Nawab, Muhammad Khan lived in Hisar while Taj Khan and Quttub Khan ruled Tussam in Punjab. Mohan Khan and Ikhtiar Khan were the rulers of Fatehabad and Dhosi.

After the death of their father at the hands of Khizar Khan, they dispersed and chose to avoid confrontation with Hakim-e-Delhi. Taj Khan was the eldest son of Nawab Qaim Khan and was made the Nawab of Hisar. He ruled Hisar from 1420 - 1446 AD. After death of Taj Khan his eldest son Fateh Khan was made Nawab of Hisar but Bahlol Lodi expelled Fatehkhan from Hisar. Taj Khan's brother, Muhammad Khan was made Nawab of Hansi but he was also expelled. Both these brothers came to Shekhawati area of Rajasthan and established here two states and became Nawabs. These states were Fatehpur and Jhunjhunu. Nawab Zainudin Khan & Nawab Jabeerudin Khan founded the states of Narhar, Barwasi, Jharo Dapti, and Kayad.
