= Chhapar (disambiguation) =

Chhapar is a small town and a municipality in Churu district, Rajasthan, India.

Chhapar may also refer to:

- Chhapar, Charkhi Dadri, a village in Haryana, India
- Chhapar, Jhajjar, a small village in Haryana, India
- Chhapar (Ludhiana West), a village in Punjab, India

== See also ==
- Chapra (disambiguation)
- Chhapar Mela, an annual fair in Chhapar, Ludhiana
