= Chaparral (disambiguation) =

Chaparral is derived from the Spanish word chaparro (translation: "a forest made of short trees") and applies to a biome found in California and other Mediterranean climates.

Chaparral may also refer to:

== Biology ==
- Geococcyx, a genus of birds commonly known as roadrunners, also known as chaparral birds, chaparral cocks, or chaparrals
- Larrea divaricata, a South American plant also known as chaparral
- Larrea tridentata, a North American plant, also known as the creosote bush, used in Native American medicine and modern herbology under the name of chaparral

== Geography ==
- Chaparral, Calgary, a neighbourhood in Calgary, Alberta, Canada
- Chaparral, New Mexico, a census-designated place in New Mexico, USA
- Chaparral, Tolima, a Colombian municipality of the Department of Tolima
- El Chaparral, border crossing from San Diego, USA to Tijuana, Mexico

== Arts, entertainment, and media ==
- Stanford Chaparral, a Stanford University humor magazine
- The High Chaparral, an American 1967–71 Western-genre TV series

== Schools ==
- Chaparral High School (Arizona), in Scottsdale, Arizona
- Chaparral High School (Colorado), in Parker, Colorado
- Chaparral High School (Nevada), in Las Vegas, Nevada
- Chaparral High School, Temecula, California, in Temecula, California
- Chaparral Middle School (Diamond Bar), in Diamond Bar, California
- Chaparral Middle School (Moorpark), in Moorpark, California

== Sports ==
- Dallas Chaparrals, an American Basketball Association basketball team that became the San Antonio Spurs in 1973
- Lubbock Christian Chaparrals and Lady Chaps, the athletics division of Lubbock Christian University
- The Chaparral, the athletic mascot of the College of DuPage, in DuPage County, Illinois
- The Chaparrals is the name of sports teams of Westlake High School (Texas)

== Transportation ==
- Chaparral Boats, a line of pleasure boats manufactured in the USA
- Chaparral Cars, a motorsports manufacturer from North America

== Other uses ==
- High Chaparral Theme Park, a Western theme park in Sweden
- MIM-72 Chaparral, a U.S. Army surface-to-air missile system based on the AIM-9 Sidewinder

== See also ==
- Chaperal, a neighbourhood in Orleans, Ontario, Canada
- Chapra (disambiguation)
