= Gorir =

- city
- Location in Rajasthan, India
- Coordinates: 28.0229979°N 75.948143°E
- Country: India
- State: Rajasthan
- District: Jhunjhunu

Government
  - Sarpanch: Sapna Maan

Population
  - Total: 4,903 (2,011 Census)

Languages
  - Official: Hindi
- Time zone: UTC+5:30 (IST)
- PIN: 332746
- ISO 3166 code: RJ-IN

Gorir is a village of Jhunjhunu district in the Rajasthan state of India.

== Legend ==
The lore of Gorir as passed down by word of mouth from generation to generation goes back far in time to the thirteenth century. The legend has it that a man called Beejal, village Bansbala (located in what is now called Jind District in the state of Haryana), left his native village after a dispute with his brothers. Bansbala was populated by Jats, a people known for their martial and agricultural skills. Specifically, four gotras of Jats lived in that village – Maan, Dalal, Deshwal and Suhag. Beejal belonged to the Maan gotra.

Beejal wandered about till he ran into the village called Imrara, where he met a Brahmin (a person belonging to the upper caste of priests). Beejal hit it off with the Brahmin and they started to continue their journey together. After some time, they reached the village of Dhosi, a known holy place. Unaware about the customs of Dhosi, Beejal sat down on a sacred shila, out of bounds for all except the select Brahmins. The religious leaders fumed at this violation. Beejal pleaded innocence, but to no avail. The leaders decided to punish Beejal by marrying him to a low caste girl. The name of the girl was Gora. Even though lower caste, she belonged to a rich family. Her father was the headman of a local Gandas community and controlled huge swaths of land in the area. Beejal’s marriage to Gora proved to be a blessing in disguise for Beejal in the long term, even though he was entirely banished by his own family in Bansbala on account to his marrying a low caste girl.

Beejal set up his home in Dhosi. Beejal and Gora started a family and were quickly blessed with multiple children. Gora’s father however wanted Beejal out of his realm. To push Beejal away, the headman told Beejal that he would grant him all the land which Beejal could cover in one day on a horse. The headman even gifted him a horse toward this purpose. The lure was too strong and Beejal accepted. In one long day, Beejal managed to cover an area of 52,000 bighas on the gifted horse. The headman kept his promise. Beejal became a large land owner overnight.

The land Beejal acquired lay on the foothills of the Aravali hills. Initially, Beejal, Gora and their children settled on the peak of the hills, thinking that they would be able to keep an eye on their properly from the high location. Little did they realize that the hills were teeming with wild life. The roars of the lions, which frequently reverberated in the surrounding hills, frightened the family enough for them to desert the hilltop for a safer land locked between Aravali hills called Buda-khera, which literally mean a large pond.

The Beejal clan lived in Buda-khera for ninety-nine years in a single stretch. But the promise of greener pastures proved to be too strong. A family member spotted a bull drinking water from a small pond. Near the pond was a kuchha well (a gochi). The pond was located next to a small mountain free of wild life, adding further attraction to the location. Slowly over the next few decades, the Beejal clan made their way to this location.

They named the new village, Gorir, in honor of Gora, the original matriarch ancestor of the family.

The initial generations stayed higher up on the Gorir mountain. Later generations stepped down to the open grounds when they noticed no threat to their lives. Over the years, people from other castes joined Gorir to provide services Jats needed. Carpenter, barbers, kumhars and even upper caste pandits and banias took up residence in the village. Jats continued to dominate however, as they still do today.

The authenticity of this legend would be hard to establish as there are no known records of any type which can shed light on the deep history of Gorir.

== Demographics ==
As per the Government of India Census, 2011, the village of Gorir has a population of 4903. Males constitute 53% of the population and females 47%. Young children less than six years in age constitute 13% of the population. About 18% of the population belongs to the scheduled castes and tribes. The literary rates are 76% for males and 53% for females.

== Notable people ==
- Kamla Beniwal, born 1927, the first woman minister in the Rajasthan Government, ex-Governor of Gujarat, Tripura, Mizoram. She is daughter of freedom fighter Netram Maan, a native of Gorir village.
- Netram Maan, the freedom fighter.
- Sonu Kumari Maan, Indian Administrative Service.
