= Nethrana =

Nethrana is a village in Hanumangarh District of Rajasthan state, in India. This is the largest village of Bhadra tehsil.The founder of this village was Nethu Beniwal and this village was found in 1860 It is situated on Gogamedi-Sirsa road. Nearby towns/cities are :- Gogamedi - 7 km. away Bhadra - 25 km. away Sirsa - 37 km.away .
