= Sonasar =

Village in Rajasthan, India

Coordinates: 28°13′N 75°23′E

Sonasar is a village in Jhunjhunu District in Rajasthan, India. Sonasar is 10 kilometres (6.2 mi) north of Jhunjhunu. The village was founded by Sona Ram Jat of Bhadia gotra in 1616, who gave the name Sonasar to the village.

The area of the village is 18,000 bigha. There are four temples in the village, one of which honors Gogaji.
