= Chhapar (Ludhiana West) =

- Village
- Location in Punjab, India Chhapar (India)
- Coordinates: 30.674571°N 75.7977354°E
- Country: India
- State: Punjab
- District: Ludhiana
- Tehsil: Ludhiana West

Government
  - Type: Panchayati raj (India)
  - Body: Gram panchayat

Languages
  - Official: Punjabi
  - Other spoken: Hindi
- Time zone: UTC+5:30 (IST)
- Telephone code: 0161
- ISO 3166 code: IN-PB
- Vehicle registration: PB-10
- Website: ludhiana.nic.in

Chhapar is a village located in the Ludhiana West tehsil, of Ludhiana district, Punjab.

== Culture ==
The village hosts an annual mela fair dedicated to the folk deity Gugga, known as Chhapar Mela. A marhi dedicated to the deity was constructed in 1890 in the village.

== Administration ==
The village is administrated by a Sarpanch who is an elected representative of village as per constitution of India and Panchayati raj (India).

Particulars	Total	Male	Female
Total No. of Houses	1,591		
Population	7,974	4,275	3,699
Child (0-6)	882	497	385
Schedule Caste	2,936	1,550	1,386
Schedule Tribe	0	0	0
Literacy	75.55 %	79.91 %	70.58 %
Total Workers	3,151	2,435	716
Main Worker	2,584	0	0
Marginal Worker	567	322	245

== Air travel connectivity ==
The closest airport to the village is Sahnewal Airport.
