= Gogamedi =

Gogameri Goga Meri
- Village
- Nickname: Gugameri (Gogaji ka Niwas)
- Location in Rajasthan, India Gogameri (India)
- Coordinates: 29.157296°N 75.028982°E
- Country: India
- State: Rajasthan
- District: Hanumangarh

Government
  - Body: Gram panchayat

Languages
  - Official: Hindi
- Time zone: UTC+5:30 (IST)
- ISO 3166 code: RJ-IN
- Vehicle registration: RJ-49
- Website: https://gogamedi.org

Gogamedi is a village of religious importance in the Hanumangarh district of Rajasthan (India), 30 km from Nohar, Rajasthan, 20 km from Bhadra, Rajasthan, 80 km from Hisar, 245 km from Delhi and 359 km from Jaipur.

== Gogamedi fair ==
A grand fair is held at Gogamedi Gogaji Temple in August in memory of Gogaji (from Dadrewa village in Churu district). The fair is held from the ninth day of the dark half of Bhaadra (Goga Navami) to the eleventh day of the dark half of the same month.

== Location ==
Gogamedi is accessible on NH 65 from Chandigarh; go straight to Hisar (Haryana) (230 km) and from Hisar take the road to Bhadra (60 km) and Gogamedi lies around 25 km from Nohar on the way to Bhadra. From Delhi take the NH09 to Hisar (165 km) and from Hisar take the road to Bhadra-Nohar.
