= Panj peer =

Five Sufi saints mentioned in the classic book 'Heer Ranjha' by Waris Shah

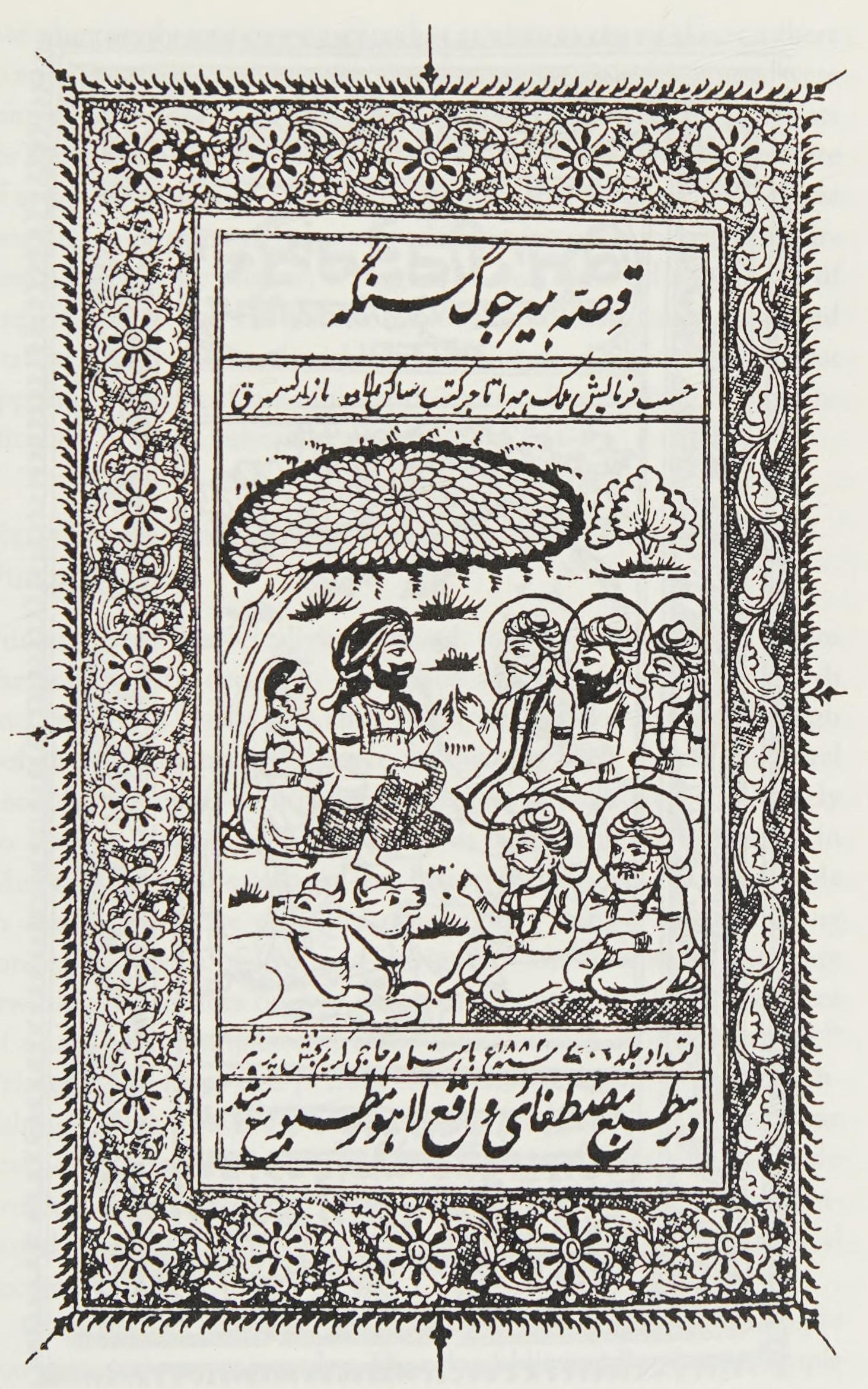
Depiction of Heer and Ranjha sitting before the panj pir, from the title page of Qissa Hir Jog Singh, lithograph, Lahore, 1882

Panj peer (or panj pīr), meaning the five saints in Persian, were Islamic saints who overlapped in late 12th and early 13th centuries in northwestern India. There was also a similar tradition in Rajasthan, known as Panch Pir, whose quintet were subsequently Rajputized.

== Sufis ==
The Islamic panj pirs were:

Sufi panj peers
No.	Name	Portrait	Lifespan	Region	Reference(s)
1.	Mu'in al-Din Chishti		1143 – 1236	Ajmer, Rajasthan	(Note: He is also known as 'gharīb nawāz'.)
2.	Qutb al-Din Bakhtiyar Kaki		1173 – 1235	Mehrauli, Delhi	
3.	Farid al-Din Ganjshakar		1179 – 1266	Pakpattan, Punjab	
4.	Baha al-Din Zakariya		1182 – 1268	Multan, Punjab	
5.	Lal Shahbaz Qalandar		1177 – 1274	Sehwan, Sindh	

The above Sufi saints are mentioned (alongside Nizam al-Din Awliya) in the great love-epic of the Sufi poet sayyid Waris Shah, Heer Ranjha, which opens with an invocation to them.

== Rajasthan ==
The concept of panch pir in Rajasthan likely derived from the earlier concept of punch pir in Punjab and other parts of northwestern India. Which figures were included in the panch pir quintet varied by region, however Goga was usually always included amongst the five. In Rajasthan, these panch pir were:

Rajasthani panch pirs
No.	Name	Portrait
1.	Gogaji	
2.	Pabuji	
3.	Ramdevji	
4.	Harabhuji	
5.	Mallinathji (Note: He is sometimes substituted with Meha Mangalia, also known as Mehoji.)	
Sometimes included:
	Meha Mangali (Mehoji)	

These five (or six) figures were folk-deities. Some of these figures were not originally perceived as Rajput heroes and became Rajputized later-on after the 18th century. Originally, figures such as Gogaji, Pabuji, Ramdetji, and Harabhuji were originally associated with the downtrodden sections of society, particularly peasants and pastoralists, but they became appropriated as Rajput figures and their identities were usurped by the ruling-classes.

== See also ==
- Panj Pyare
