= Chhapar Mela =

Annual festival in Ludhiana, India

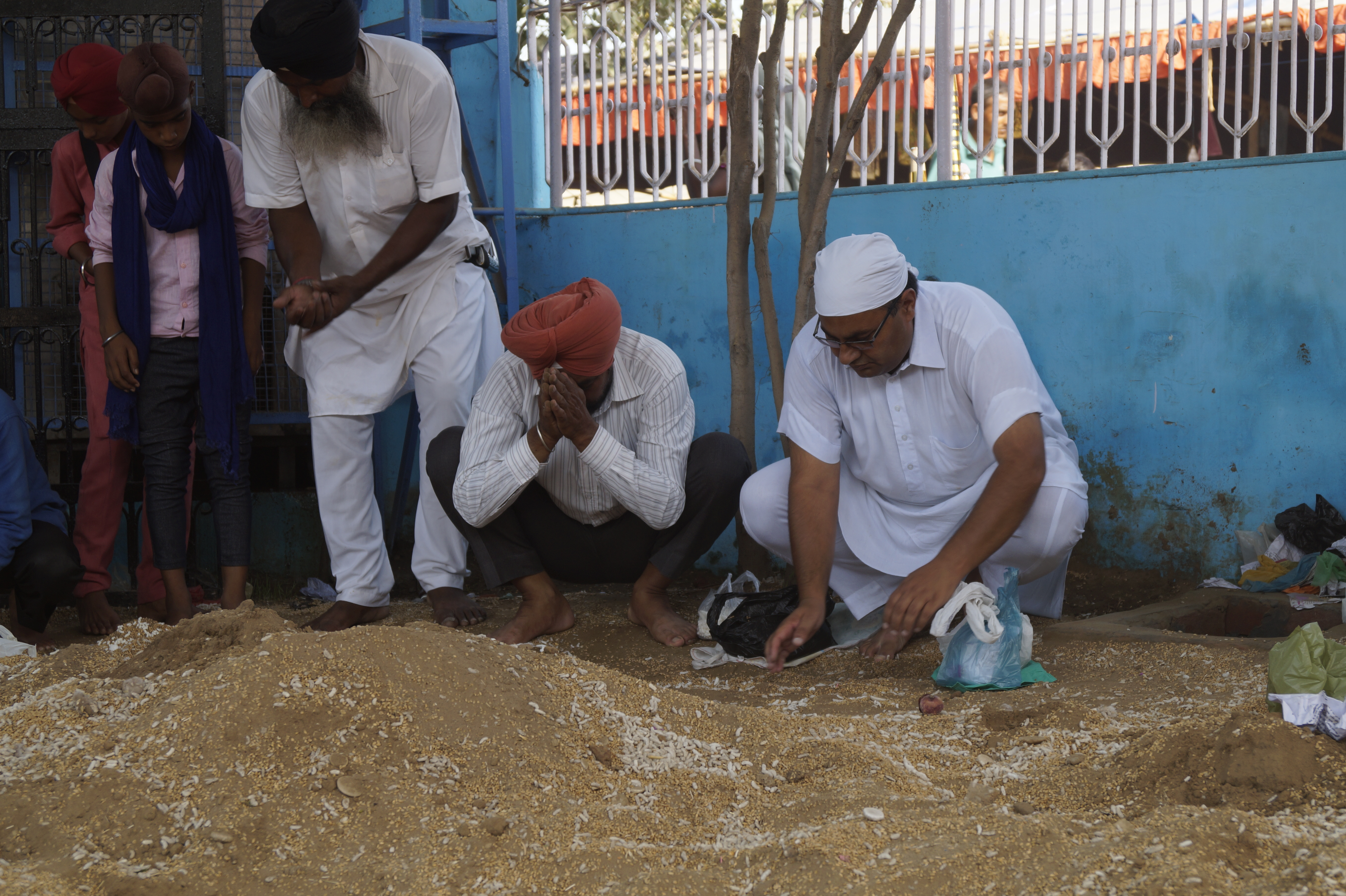
Chhapar Mela, Chhapar, Ludhiana, Punjab, India (2016)

Chhapar Mela is celebrated in the village of Chhapar in the district of Ludhiana, Punjab, India every year in September. This mela (fair), held in memory of Gugga is one of the most popular festivals of the Malwa belt of Punjab. The festival is attended by Jatts and politicians.

== Folklore and practices ==
This three-day fair commemorates the descent of the Gugga Veer, a Chauhan Rajput, into the bosom of Mother Earth along with his steed.

According to the legend, he possessed extraordinary powers over all kinds of snakes. The fair is celebrated at Gugge di Marhi, a big holy place built in his memory that has a reputation for curing people of snake bites. Earth is scooped up seven times to appeal to Gugga Veer for safety against snakes.

People sing folk songs and present folk dances. The fair is held on the Anant Chaturdashi on the 14th day of the bright half of the Bhadon (mid-August through mid-September as per the Hindu calendar).

People mainly worship the snake embodiment of Gugga at this fair. The fair falls on the fourteenth day of Shukla Paksha of the month of Bhadrapad every year. It is believed that the Chhapar Fair was started around 150 years ago by a small congregation of devotees. In recent years the number of people attending the fair has risen to millions.

The Minor Chhapar Mela is also held at the same place. The special trend of scooping the land (seven times) is also practised at this fair. People consider digging of land will bring Gugga Veer to protect them against snakes. The fair has much music, fun and dance. The fair has emerged as a grand festival in the past few decades.

The legend narrates the story of a boy and a snake born together in an agricultural family in Chhapar village. The serpent and the boy were so intimate that if one suffered a pain the other used to cry. One day the mother of the child went to the fields after laying him on a cot. To save him from the scorching sun, the snake stretched its hood over him. Thinking that the snake was going to bite the child, a passerby killed it with a stick. The child died immediately after the death of the snake and the family was left in sorrow. The family was advised by the elders to perform religious ceremonies to worship Gugga and Siddha and a he-goat was left free to mark the place of worship by striking at a particular place. The place was recognised as Mari Gugga where people from all walks of life have been worshipping Gugga on the fourteenth day of the bright half of the month of Bhadon every year. The farmers of the Malwa belt recognise the fair to the extent that they change the agricultural chores according to the dates of the mela.

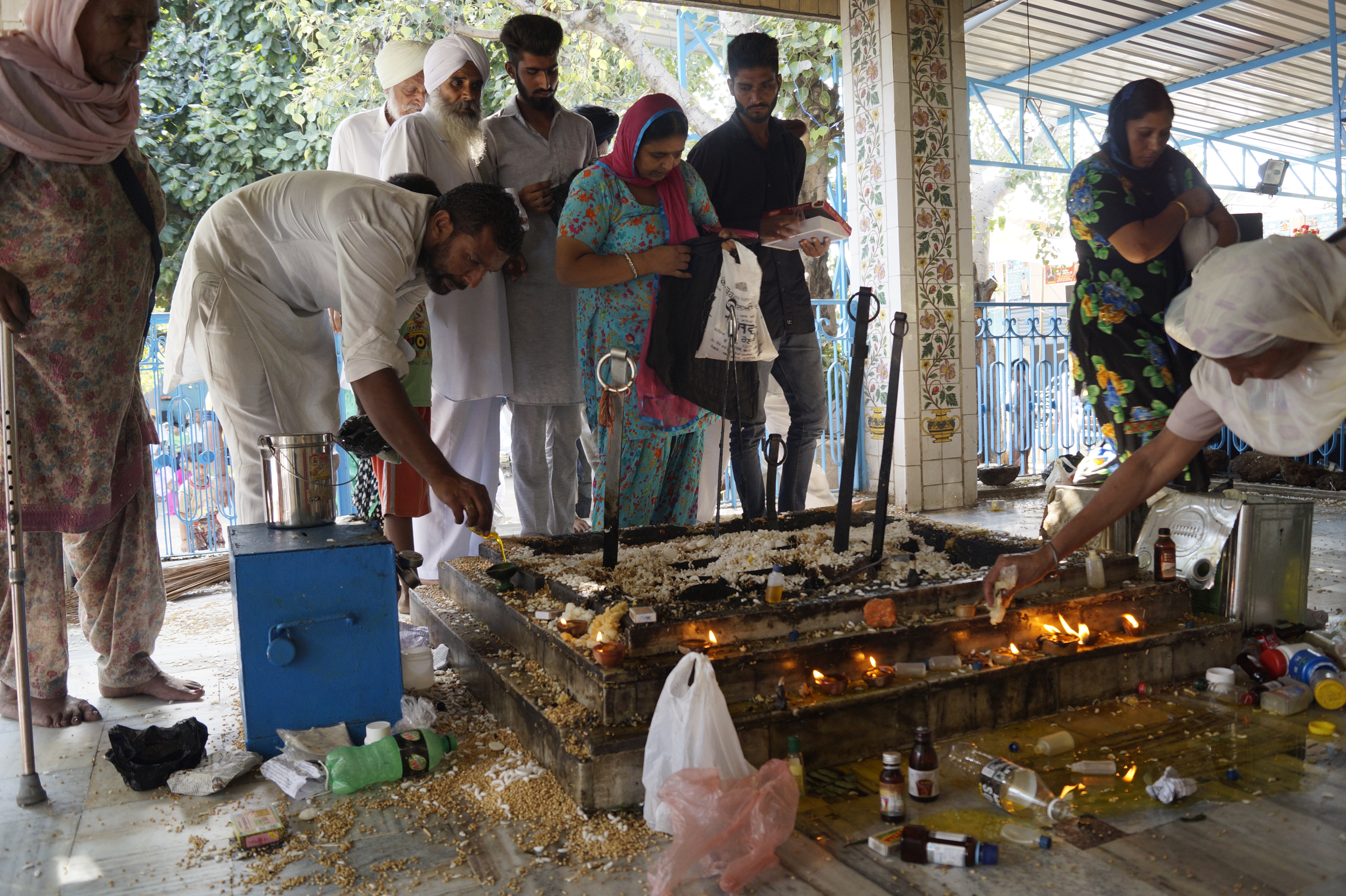
Chhapar Mela, Chhapar, Ludhiana, Punjab, India (2016)

People also narrate another story regarding the second fair known as Minor Chhapar Mela. At the beginning of the 20th century, the Maharaja was said to have banned the Mela because of a complaint by some farmers. But soon after the ruler banned the event, his horses started dying mysteriously and the misfortune stopped only after the ruler announced plans to organise the Minor Mela following the major one.

According to another story, a faqir once anchored a twig after cleaning his teeth. A local person uprooted the twig in fun. The faqir then cursed the people of the local area so that the place would witness a heavy camp, which would be followed by a deserted look.
