= Thaneek Pura =

Thaneek Pura Thanik Pura
- Hill station
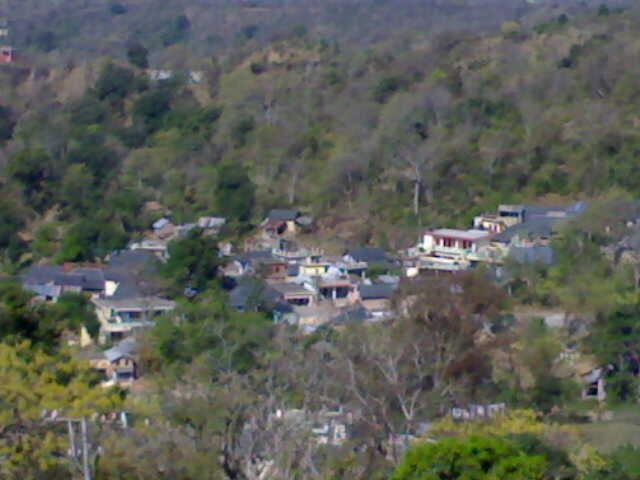

- Location in Himachal Pradesh, India Thaneek Pura (India)
- Coordinates: 31.8167°N 76.1333°E
- Country: India
- State: Himachal Pradesh
- District: Una
- Elevation: 950 m (3,120 ft)
- Time zone: UTC+5:30 (IST)
- PIN: 177109
- Telephone code: 911976
- Website: thaneekpura.itzall.in

Thaneek Pura is a hill station and village (hamlet) in Chintpurni in the Una district of the state of Himachal Pradesh in India. It is situated near the Chintpurni Shakta pitha Temple, which is a place of pilgrimage for Hindus. The area is surrounded by the western Himalayas in the north and east in the smaller Shiwalik (or Shivalik) range bordering the state of Punjab.

== Notable sites ==
Temples

- Radha Krishna Temple
- Guga Zahar Veer Temple
- Mahiya Sidh Temple
- Baba Balak Naath Temple

== Geography ==
Thaneek Pura is situated at the altitude of around 950 meters and is part of the Una district, Himachal Pradesh. It is near Bharwain, located on the Hoshiarpur-Dharmashala road. The road is part of the State Highway network.
