= Chapra =

Chhapra can refer to the following:

- Chapra (Buddha), a fictional character in the manga series Buddha

== Places ==
- Chapra, Nadia (community development block), in Nadia district, West Bengal, India
  - Chapra, Nadia, census town in Chapra, Nadia (community development block), in Nadia district, West Bengal, India
  - Chapra, West Bengal Assembly constituency, in Nadia district, West Bengal, India
- Chhapra, headquarters of Saran district, Bihar, India
  - Chapra, Bihar Assembly constituency, in Saran district, Bihar, India
  - Chapra Lok Sabha constituency, a former Lok Sabha constituency in Bihar, India

== See also ==
- Chhapar (disambiguation)
