= Chaparral Boats =

Line of pleasure boats manufactured in the US

- Founded: 1965
- Founder: William "Buck" Pegg and Reggie Rose
- Headquarters: Nashville, Georgia, United States
- Key people: President James "Jim" A. Lane
- Products: Pleasure and fishing boats
- Website: www.chaparralboats.com

Chaparral Boats (originally Fiberglass Fabricators) was founded in 1965 by William "Buck" Pegg and Reggie Rose in Ft. Lauderdale, Florida. The company's bellwether boat at the time was the 15-ft Tri-Hull with a sticker price of $675. Although the tri-hull was discontinued in the early 1980s, many remain in commission today.

== History ==
After a short tenure attending college for Dentistry, in 1964 Pegg went to work at his father's company where he manufactured fiberglass goods. Pegg's father started the company in 1961, called Fiberglass Fabricators, he produced fiberglass components for many different industries, including the marine industry. Reggie Rose acquired a 50% interest in Fiberglass Fabricators in 1963 and helped build a customer base. Fiberglass Fabricators produced their first boat hulls in 1964 and was producing their own complete boats by 1965. Fiberglass Fabricators then started to focus all their efforts on manufacturing boats and shy away from other products. Among other innovations, Rose developed a process for Pompanette Fishing Chairs to make molded fiberglass seat boards, arm rests and seat backs. This process is still in use today.

== Re-locations ==
In 1967, a fire destroyed Chaparral's Ft. Lauderdale facility, but the company rebuilt. By 1976, Chaparral Boats had outgrown its Ft. Lauderdale production facility and was looking to expand. Later that year, the Larsen boat manufacturing facility in Nashville, Georgia, became available, after Larsen Boats filed for bankruptcy. In 1976, Chaparral Boats purchased the facility and moved its headquarters to Nashville, Georgia, where it operates today as a Georgia corporation. Soon after re-location, James "Jim" A. Lane (CPA) joined the company as president, until his death in March 2016

== Purchases and Company Changes ==
In 1977 after 14 years as President and co-owner, Reggie Rose sold his interest with a 7 year non-compete agreement.

In 1986, Chaparral Boats was purchased by RPC Energy Services (NYSE:RES) of Atlanta, Georgia. In 2001 RPC spun off Marine Products Corporation (NYSE:MPX). This offering included Chaparral Boats, Inc. and Robalo Boats, LLC (Purchased from Brunswick Boat Group in 2001).

== Product Line ==
In 2012, Chaparral introduced a lower priced vessel, the H_{2}O speed boat, to appeal to a wider audience. In 2013, it combined the company's luxury roots with speed, launching the Premiere 420, a 42-foot sport yacht.

Chaparral currently manufactures pleasure, ski/sport and fishing boats ranging from 20-foot sport boats to 33-foot yachts in its 1-million square foot facility in Nashville, Georgia.

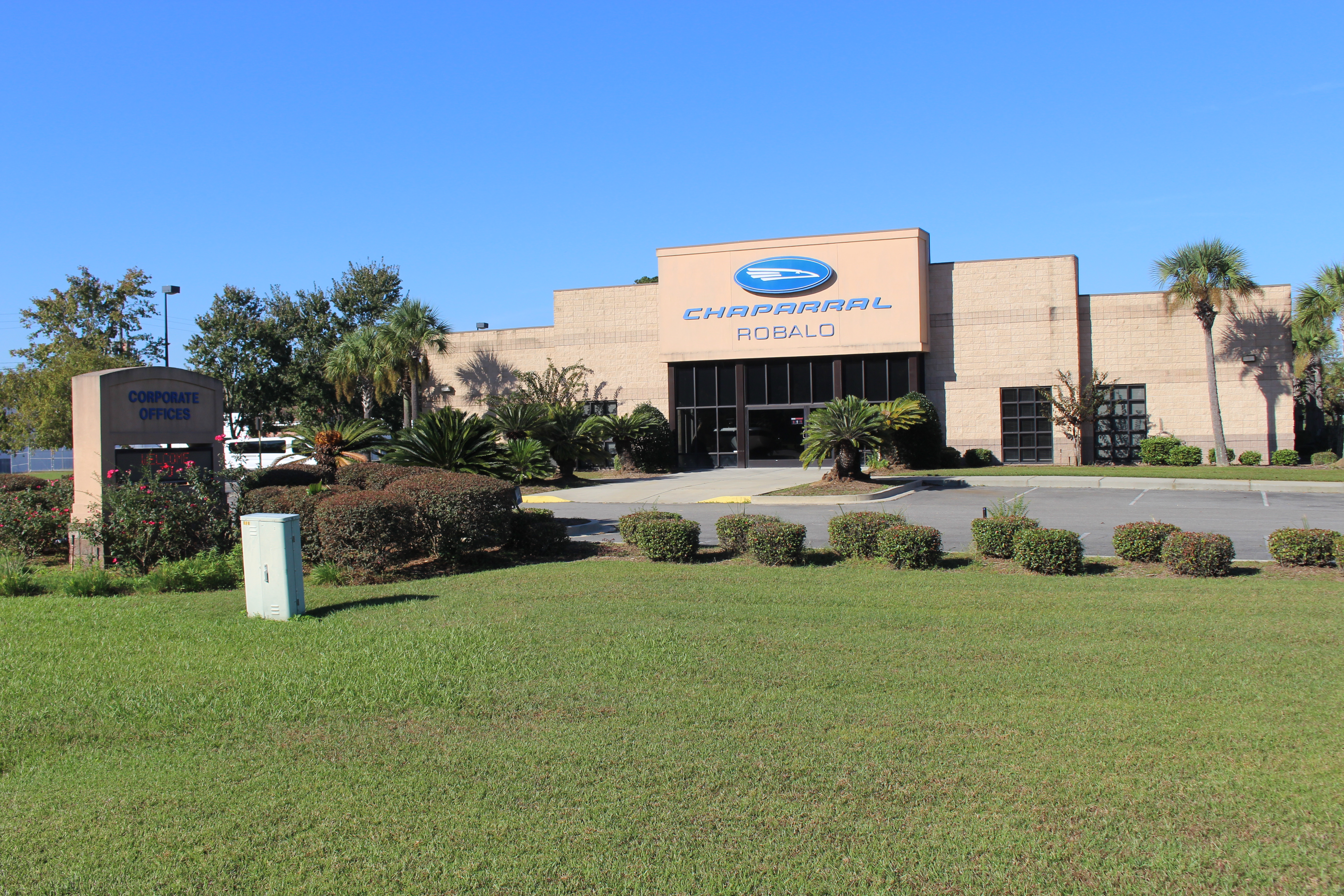
Chaparral Corporate Offices in Nashville, Georgia, 2003–present

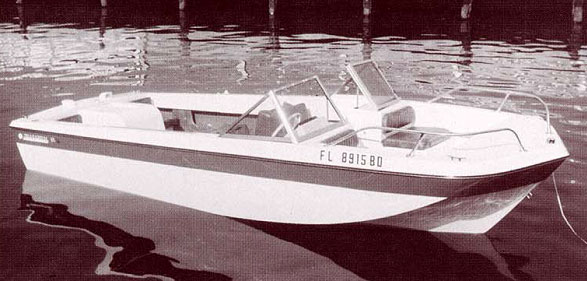
The Tri-Hull design Chaparral circa 1972

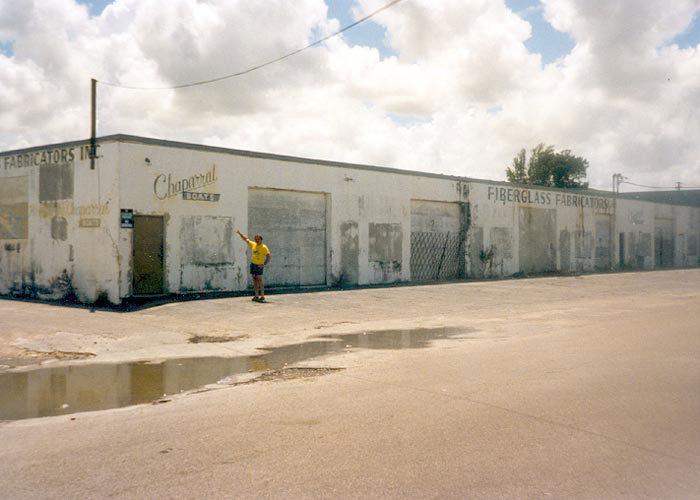
Original Chaparral production facility commissioned 1965–1976

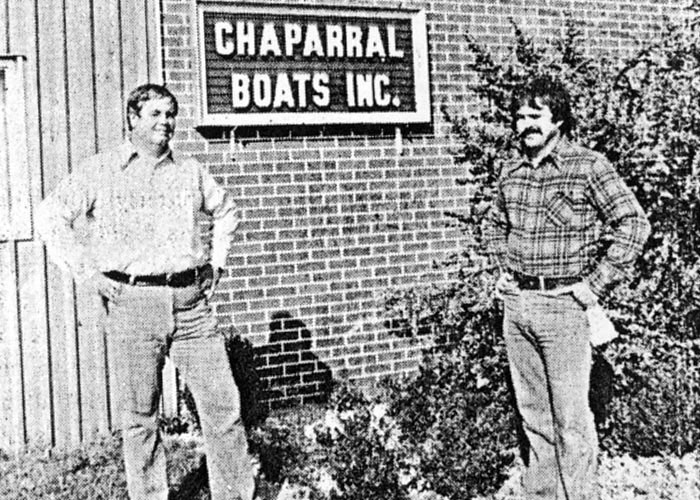
Chaparral Production Facility in Nashville, 1976–2003
