= Dhosi =

- Village
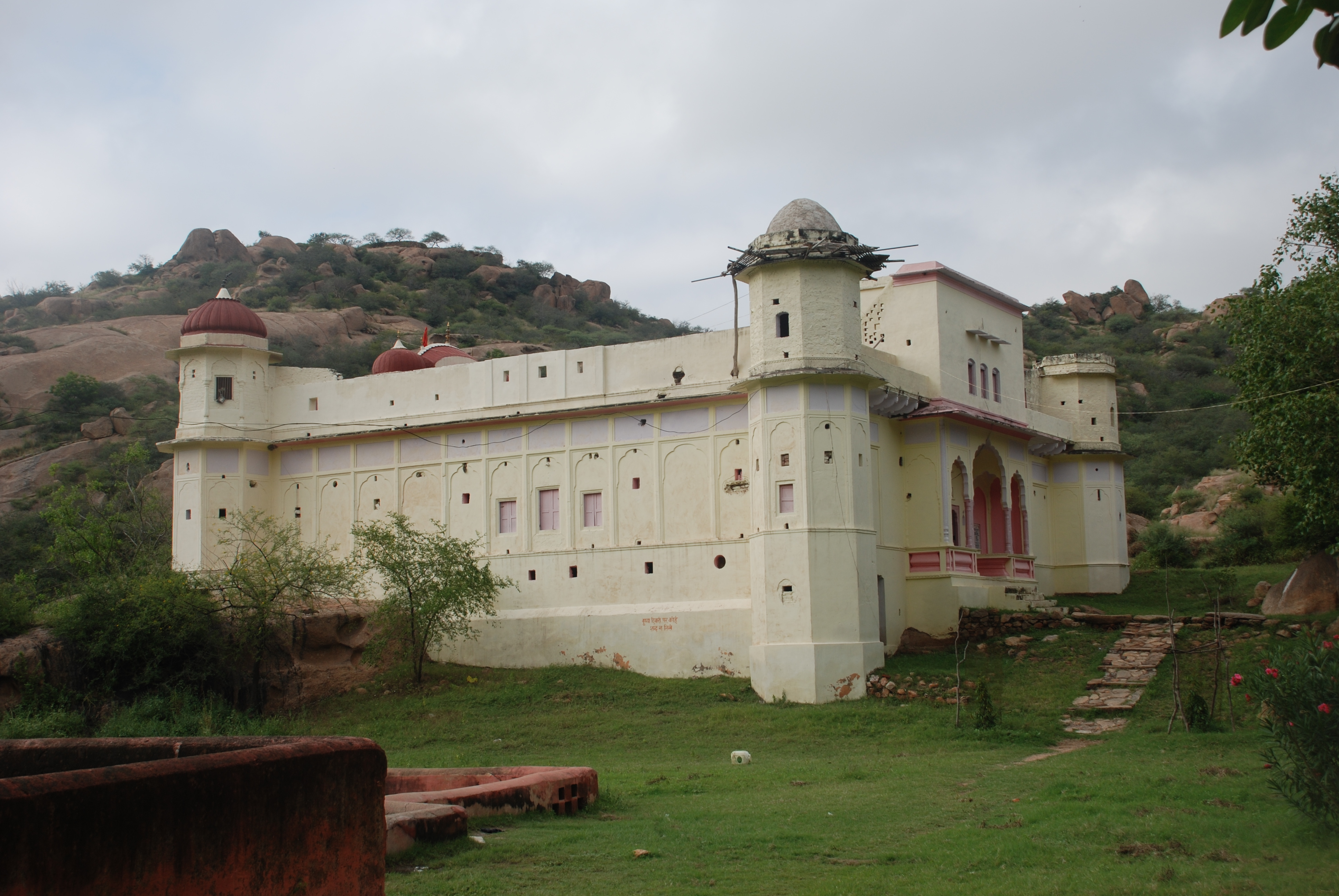
- Chyvan Rishi Temple on Dhosi Hill

- Dhosi within the map of Rajasthan
- Coordinates: 28.071900°N 76.024684°E
- Country: India
- State: Rajasthan
- District: Jhunjhunu district

Population (2011)
  - Total: 1,543
- Time zone: UTC+5:30 (IST)
- ISO 3166 code: IN-RJ

Dhosi is a village in Khetri subdistrict, Jhunjhunu district, Rajasthan, India.

== Demographics/Population of 2011 ==
As of 2011 India census, Dhosi had a population of 1543 in 321 households. Males (786) constitute 50.93% of the population and females (757) 49.06%. Dhosi has an average literacy (1032) rate of 66.88%, lower than the national average of 74%: male literacy (630) is 61.04%, and female literacy (402) is 38.95% of total literates (1032). In Dhosi, 11.34% of the population is under 6 years of age (175). dhosi has now population of 873 males and 842 females.

== See also ==
- Dhosi Hill
