= Dadrewa =

- village
- Location in Rajasthan, India Dadrewa (India)
- Coordinates: 28°40′22″N 75°13′58″E
- Country: India
- State: Rajasthan
- District: Churu

Government
  - Body: Panchayat

Population (2011)
  - Total: 9,040

Languages
  - Official: Hindi
- Time zone: UTC+5:30 (IST)
- PIN: 331023
- Telephone code: 01559
- ISO 3166 code: RJ-IN
- Sex ratio: 1079 ♂/♀
- Website: http://dadrewadham.com/

Dadrewa is a village situated in Churu district of Rajasthan, India. The village is situated on the Hissar-Bikaner Highway in between Sadulpur and Taranagar. The famous Gogaji maharaj, was born at Dadrewa.
