= List of Indian journalists =

This list of Indian journalists includes notable journalists working in India who write and speak in one of many official languages of India.

== A ==
- Javed Anand, (born ca. 1950), alternative journalist, co-founder of Sabrang Communications, and co-editor of Communalism Combat, who is married to journalist Teesta Setalvad.
- Afshan Anjum, journalist and anchor. She worked as a senior news editor with NDTV India.
- Shiv Aroor (born 25 September 1980), specializes in defence news on India Today television and is an author.
- Vishal Arora, journalist covering life and politics and a founding editor of StoriesAsia.

== B ==
- Punya Prasun Bajpai, former journalist at Aaj Tak, ABP News. Winner of two Ramnath Goenka awards.
- Kaveree Bamzai, the only woman to have been the editor of India Today magazine.
- Shereen Bhan (born 20 August 1976), an executive editor who was named as a 2009 World Economic Forum Young Global Leader
- Pradeep Bhandari, Indian TV journalist, author, worked for India News and Republic TV.
- Raju Bharatan (1934 – 7 February 2020), former cricket and music journalist with 'The Illustrated Weekly of India' and 'Screen' and author on several books on cricket and Hindi music personalities.
- Harsha Bhogle (born 19 July 1961), Indian cricket Commentator and journalist. He was born in a Marathi speaking family in Hyderabad.
- Anubha Bhonsle (born 3 April 1978), television and print journalist, a winner of the Ramnath Goenka Award for Best Political Reporter, 2012 and the Chameli Devi Award for Woman Media Person of the Year, 2014.
- Bhupendra Chandra Datta Bhowmik (19 February 1940 – 9 September 1997), founder of Bengali language daily newspaper Dainik Sambad
- Praful Bidwai (12 June 1949 – 23 June 2015), journalist and activist against nuclear armaments, a past recipient of the C H Mohammed Koya National Journalism Award, who along with Achin VanaikAchin Vanaik won the 2000 Seán MacBride Peace Prize.
- Mihir Bose (born 12 January 1947), journalist and author. He writes a weekly "Big Sports Interview" for the London Evening Standard, and also writes and broadcasts on sport and social and historical issues for several outlets including the BBC, the Financial Times and Sunday Times. He was the BBC Sports Editor until 4 August 2009.
- Shujaat Bukhari (25 February 1968 – 14 June 2018), founding editor of Rising Kashmir, killed by gunmen.
- Dionne Bunsha, worked for Frontline. Winner of various journalism awards including a Ramnath Goenka award.

== C ==
- Vikram Chandra (born 7 January 1967), journalist, anchor, and group CEO at NDTV. His mother is former journalist Nandini Chandra
- Ramananda Chatterjee (29 May 1865 – 30 September 1943), founder, editor, and owner of the Calcutta based magazine, the Modern Review. He has been described as the father of Indian journalism.
- Devyani Chaubal (1942 – 13 July 1995), Indian film journalist and columnist of 60s and 70s.
- Shoma Chaudhury, managing editor of the Indian daily Tehelka. She has won Ramnath Goenka Excellence in Journalism Awards for print journalism in 2007, the Chameli Devi Award in 2009, and the Mumbai Press Club Award for Political Writing in 2012 on Soni Sori titled, 'The Inconvenient Truth of Soni Sori'.
- Sudhir Chaudhary, senior editor and business head of Zee News and editor-in-chief and CEO of WION, Zee Business and DNA, an English news publication
- Zafar Choudhary journalist from Jammu and Kashmir. He is founder and editor of The Dispatch, a news and knowledge media startup in India.
- Prabhu Chawla (born 2 October 1946), recipient of Padma Bhushan and Editorial Director of The New Indian Express Group as of 2016.

== D ==
- Sucheta Dalal (born ca 1962), female columnist, who is the winner of the civilian award Padma Shri in 2006
- Swapan Dasgupta (born 3 September 1955), a senior editor at multiple major newspapers in India and TV personality
- Amish Devgan, journalist and managing editor of News18 India.
- Jyotirmoy Dey (1955 – 11 June 2011), investigative journalist who was murdered 11 June 2011 and posthumously awarded the Prem Bhatia Award in 2011 for political reporter of the year, which he shared with Josy Joseph
- Subal Kumar Dey, founder and chief editor of Bengali language daily newspaper Syandan Patrika.
- Dibang, senior journalist and member of a debate panel with the news channel ABP News, is rated among the best Hindi anchors in the industry today. He is also hosting prime-time show Jana Mana on ABP news.
- Vaishali Dinakaran, a motorsports journalist with Overdrive, is currently with Deutsche Welle. She received the ‘ProDrive Motorsports Award’ for the years 2018 and 2019 presented by The Guild of Motoring Writers, a prestigious organization of automotive editorial professionals in the world.
- Neha Dixit, multiple award-winning journalist. 2019 CPJ International Press Freedom Award, 2017, Chameli Devi Jain Award for Outstanding Woman Journalist, 2015 Press Institute of India-Red Cross award
- Vinod Dua (11 March 1954 – 4 December 2021), journalist, news anchor, political commentator, election analyst who was called the face of Indian television due to his decades of television journalism. He is a recipient of Padma Shri (2008).
- Bahar Dutt (born c. 1975), environmental and wildlife journalist and editor for CNN-News18 and winner of multiple awards, including the 2006 Ramnath Goenka Award for excellence in environmental reporting,
- Barkha Dutt (born 18 December 1971) of NDTV, past recipient of the C H Mohammed Koya National Journalism Award, gained notoriety in the Radia tapes controversy

== F ==
- George Francis (photographer) Popular as the Father of Indian Motorsports Photography, Francis was an Indian Express journalist who quit his regular journalism job to focus on Motorsports.
- T. J. S. George (born 7 May 1928), past recipient of the C H Mohammed Koya National Journalism Award,
- Gour Kishore Ghosh (20 June 1923 – 15 December 2000), winner of the 1981 Ramon Magsaysay Award for Journalism, Literature, and Creative Communication Arts
- Santosh Kumar Ghosh (9 September 1920 – 26 February 1985), award-winning Bengali journalist and editor of Anandabazar Patrika (The namesake of the "Santosh Kumar Ghosh Memorial Award")
- Pushpa Girimaji, consumer rights journalist
- Ramnath Goenka (22 April 1904 – 5 October 1991) Founder of India Express Group and publisher of the English-language The Indian Express, Hindi-language Jansatta, and Marathi-language Loksatta
- J. Gopikrishnan (born 10 April 1971), cartoonist
- Arnab Goswami (born 7 March 1973), managing director and editor-in-chief of Republic Media Network (Republic TV, Republic Bharat TV)
- Biju Govind (born 14 June 1972), senior journalist of The Hindu based in Kerala
- Deshbandhu Gupta (14 June 1901 – 21 November 1951), Indian journalist, independence activist, founder and editor of Daily Tej.
- Shekhar Gupta (born 26 August 1957), editor-in-chief ThePrint.

== H ==
- Sajjad Haider, (born 21 October 1966), media personality of Indian administered Kashmir, Editor-in-Chief Trans Asia News Service and Founder of Kashmir Observer
- Barjinder Singh Hamdard, editor-in-chief of the Punjabi-language newspaper, Daily Ajit, from Jalandhar.

== J ==
- Muzamil Jaleel (born 17 November 1972), a deputy editor of Indian Express.
- Manoj Joshi, Sports journalist, author and tv commentator. He is the only Indian TV commentator to do 550 hours of live TV commentary on wrestling. He has been named in the Limca Book of Records 2021. He currently serves as the Digital Sports Head for ITV network group.

== K ==
- Brahm Kanchibhotla (1953–6 April 2020), writer on the developing Telugu community in America.
- Raj Kanwar (born 1930), journalist and author based in Dehradun.
- Anjana Om Kashyap, Indian journalist and anchor. She is an executive editor of the Hindi news channel Aaj Tak.
- B. K. Karanjia (21 December 1919 – 25 June 2012), Indian film journalist and editor, Filmfare and Screen, chairman NFDC.
- Kalki Krishnamurthy (9 September 1899 – 5 December 1954), Tamil editor, columnist, and the founder of Kalki magazine.
- Ravish Kumar, news anchor, winner of Ramon Magsaysay Award (2019). He is a two-time recipient of the Ramnath Goenka Excellence in Journalism Award (2013, 2017) for the broadcast category in the Hindi language. He is a published author. He was also the executive editor of NDTV India. He also runs his own Youtube channel "Ravish Kumar Official".
- Rahul Kanwal, journalist and News Director at India Today. Kanwal also hosts prime-time show Newstrack on weekdays and interview based show, Jab We Met, on India Today.

== L ==
- R. K. Laxman (24 October 1921 – 26 January 2015), winner of the 1984 Ramon Magsaysay Award for Journalism, Literature, and Creative Communication Arts

== M ==
- Boria Majumdar, Indian sports journalist on India Today and Aaj Tak. Majumdar is married to Sharmistha Gupta.
- Inder Malhotra (1 February 1930 – 11 June 2016), received the Ramnath Goenka Lifetime Achievement Award in 2013
- Ashok Malik, former senior editor for English-language newspaper Indian Express and current columnist for The Times of India, Economic Times, The Pioneer and other publications
- Annamma Mathew (22 March 1922 – 10 July 2003), chief editor of the Malayalam-language Vanitha women's magazine for Malayala Manorama and wife of K. M. Mathew
- K. M. Mathew (2 January 1917 – 1 August 2010), known as the chief editor of Malayala Manorama, which has the largest circulation of any Malayalam-language newspaper, and husband of Annamma Mathew
- Chandan Mitra (born 12 December 1954 – 1 September 2021), present editor and managing director of The Pioneer newspaper
- Udayan Mukherjee 2012, Ramnath Goenka Awards, managing editor for CNBC-TV18.
- Satyendra Murli (born 14 February 1983), journalist, media researcher, socio-political activist, popularly known as an Ambedkarite journalist, Dr.B.R. Ambedkar National Awardee, presently associated with Doordarshan Samachar (DD NEWS), public broadcaster of India.
- Vipul Mudgal (born June 1960), journalist, media scholar and activist, known for his on policing, political violence and coynter terrorism, also heads a rights-based NGO Common Cause in Delhi.
- Saiyed Zegham Murtaza, journalist, columnist, author, blogger.

== N ==
- Kusum Nair (1919–1993), journalist and writer on agricultural policy
- A. G. Noorani (born 16 September 1930), columnist, as well as a historian and lawyer, who is a past recipient of the C H Mohammed Koya National Journalism Award,
- Saeed Naqvi (born 1940), journalist, columnist, interviewer and have interviews global leaders like Fidel Castro, Gaddafi, Ezer Weizman and otherz.

== P ==
- Karma Paljor, Indian television news anchor and journalist.
- Malini Parthasarathy, former editor and executive editor of The Hindu, she also founded The Hindu Centre for Politics and Public Policy.
- Rajalakshmi Parthasarathy, or Mrs. Y. G. P., (8 November 1925 – 6 August 2019), 2010 Padma Shri civilian award recipient
- Nanasaheb Parulekar (20 September 1898 – 8 January 1973), a founder of Marathi-language newspaper Sakal and chairman of the Press Trust of India, a news agency.
- Aamir Peerzada, award winning journalist and documentary filmmaker.
- Jagdish Piyush (1950–2021), editor of Amethi Samachar.
- Sanjay Pugalia, veteran political and business journalist with print and broadcast experience. Pugalia was former editor-in-chief of CNBC Awaaz in Mumbai, India.
- Aroon Purie (born 1944), Indian businessman who is the founder-publisher and editor-in-chief of India Today and the chief executive of the India Today Group. He is the managing director of Thomson Press (India) Limited and the chairman and managing director of TV Today and also the editor-in-chief of Reader's Digest India.

== Q ==
- Sayyid Ahmedullah Qadri (9 August 1909 – 5 October 1985), recipient of PadmaShri Awardee in 1966, MLC, Member of State Library Hyderabad, Chairman of Hajj Committee, Andhra Pradesh.

== R ==
- N. P. Rajendran (born 6 November 1954), award-winning editor of Mathrubhumi and Malayalam-language journalist
- Nidhi Razdan (born 11 April 1977), recipient of the 2007 Ramnath Goenka Award for Excellence in Journalism
- Sai Reddy (ca. 1962 – 6 December 2013), reporter for the Hindi-language Deshandhu, was killed by Maoists 6 December 2013, in Basaguda, Bijapur district, Chhattisgarh.
- Prannoy Roy, (born 15 October 1949), Indian journalist and media personality. He is the co-founder and executive co-chairperson of New Delhi Television (NDTV)

== S ==
- Afroz Alam Sahil, Indian journalist and author who covers topics pertaining to Indian politics, history and society. Currently, he is an editor at BeyondHeadlines.
- Danish Siddiqui (19 May 1983 – 16 July 2021) two-time Pulitzer winning Indian photojournalist and Chief Photographer for Reuters in India. Known for his coverage of conflict, displacement and crises, he was killed by the Taliban while documenting the conflict in Spin Boldak, Kandahar, Afghanistan, 16 July 2021.
- Palagummi Sainath (born 1957), winner of the 2007 Ramon Magsaysay Award for Journalism, Literature, and Creative Communication Arts
- Rohit Sardana (22 September 1979 – 30 April 2021), editor, columnist, news anchor. He was associated with Aaj Tak where he hosted his popular debate program Dangal.
- Rajdeep Sardesai (born 24 May 1965), editor-in-chief at India Today television who is a past recipient of the C H Mohammed Koya National Journalism Award,
- A Saye Sekhar, editor at MeraEvents and author at Firstpost (Network18 Group).
- Abhinandan Sekhri, journalist, co-founder and CEO of Newslaundry, a media critique, news and current affairs website.
- Niranjan Sengupta (26 July 1903 – 4 September 1969), former president of the National Union of Journalist (India) (Namesake of the "Niranjan Sengupta Memorial Award")
- Teesta Setalvad (born 9 February 1962), award-winning alternative journalist and human rights activist, co-founder of Sabrang Communications, and co-editor of Communalism Combat
- Marya Shakil (born 1983), anchor and political editor at CNN-News18
- Rajat Sharma(born 18 February 1957), chairman and editor-in-chief of an Indian Hindi news channel, India TV. He is a recipient of Padma Bhushan (2015).
- Lalit Shastri, is founder of Newsroom24x7. He has headed the Madhya Pradesh Bureau of The Hindu and The Asian Age - two of India's leading English newspapers - for more than two decades.
- Arun Shourie (born 2 November 1941), is a World Press Freedom hero and winner of the 1982 Ramon Magsaysay Award for Journalism, Literature, and Creative Communication Arts
- Aarti Tikoo Singh (born 12 October 1978), assistant editor at The Times of India, conflict and international affairs writer and reporter.
- S Nihal Singh (1929 - 2018), editor of The Statesman, The Indian Express, Indian Post and Khaleej Times. Awarded the International Editor of the Year Award in 1978 for opposing the Emergency.
- Aditya Sinha, Indian journalist and author; former editor-in-chief of The New Indian Express and DNA.
- Puripanda Appala Swamy (13 November 1904 – 18 November 1982), Telugu writer, journalist and editor

== T ==
- Paranjoy Guha Thakurta (born 5 October 1955), independent journalist and writer.
- Janardan Thakur (1936 - 1999), editor, political reporter and columnist. Editor of The Free Press Journal and most known for his book on Emergency, All The Prime Minister’s Men (1977).
- Karan Thapar (born 5 November 1955), award-winning news commentator
- Anshuman Tiwari (born 25 March 1974), journalist and editor of India Today at India Today Group in New Delhi. He is a multimedia economic/political journalist, analyst, researcher & columnist in multi languages(English & Hindi). Honored with Ramnath Goenka Award 2009 for investigative Journalism.
- Madhu Trehan, co-founder of India Today

== V ==
- Manikchandra Vajpayee (7 October 1919 – 25 December 2005), journalist, founder editor of multi-edition Hindi daily Swadesh
- Boobli George Verghese (21 June 1927 – 30 December 2014), winner of the 1975 Ramon Magsaysay Award for Journalism, Literature, and Creative Communication Arts
- Syed Vicaruddin (30 April 1942 – 10 December 2021), chief editor of Rahnuma-e-Deccan and also served as Chairman of Indo-Arab League
- Govindlal Vora (12 March 1932 – 13 May 2018), veteran journalist and chief editor of Amrit Sandesh

== Z ==
- Sahar Zaman, journalist, newscaster, news anchor, art curator, media entrepreneur, jewelry designer, guest lecturer

== See also ==
- Media of India
- List of journalists killed in India
- List of Malayalam-language newspapers
- List of newspapers in India
- List of newspapers in India by readership
- List of television stations in India
- Malayalam journalism
- Television in India
