= Final Solution (2004 film) =

2004 film by Rakesh Sharma

- Directed by: Rakesh Sharma
- Release date: 2004
- Running time: 218 minutes
- Country: India
- Languages: Gujarati; Hindi; Urdu

Final Solution a 2004 Indian documentary film directed by Rakesh Sharma, concerning the 2002 Gujarat violence in the state of Gujarat in which 254 Hindus and 790 Muslims were killed. Hindu right-wing organizations and mobs perpetrated the anti-Muslim violence, which occurred after the deaths of 70 Hindu pilgrims in the Godhra train burning on 27 February 2002. But as the film proceeds with victims continuing to come forward and share their experiences, a more unsettling possibility seems to emerge-that far from being a spontaneous expression of outrage, the makers of the film claim that the violence had been carefully coordinated and planned.

An official estimate states that 254 Hindus and 790 Muslims were killed during the violence, with 223 more missing and rendering more than 100,000 Muslims refugees. The documentary consists mostly of interviews with both Muslims and Hindus, of multiple generations and both sexes, with different views regarding the causes, justifications, and the actual events of the violence that occurred, as well as their prospects for the future.

== Synopsis ==
Part 1: Pride and Genocide deals with the carnage and its immediate aftermath. It examines the patterns of pre-planned genocidal violence (by right-wing Hindutva cadres), which many claim was state-supported, if not state-sponsored. The film reconstructs through eyewitness accounts the attack on Gulbarg and Patiya (Ahmedabad) and acts of barbaric violence against Muslim women at Eral and Delol/Kalol (Panchmahals) even as Chief Minister Modi traverses the state on his Gaurav Yatra

Part 2 : The Hate Mandate documents the poll campaign during the Assembly elections in Gujarat in late 2002. It records in detail the exploitation of the Godhra incident by the right-wing propaganda machinery for electoral gains. The film studies and documents the situation months after the elections to find shocking faultlines – voluntary ghettoisation, segregation in schools, formal calls for economic boycott of Muslims and continuing acts of violence.

== Screenings and censoring ==
The movie was initially banned in India in 2004 for alleged fears that massive communalism and radicalism would be ignited by the film. The Censor Board's ruling itself was a violation of the Indian Supreme Court rulings on this specific issue.

Final Solution was banned in India by the Censor Board for several months. The ban was lifted in Oct.'04 after a sustained campaign (an online petition, hundreds of protest screenings countrywide, multi-city signature campaigns and dozens of letters to the Government sent by audiences directly).

This was because it was depicting the 2002 Gujarat violence which was highly controversial.

A Pirate-and-Circulate campaign was conducted in protest against the ban (Get-a-free-copy-only-if-you-promise-to-pirate-and-make-5-copies). Over 10,000 free Video CDs of the film were distributed in India during this campaign, which ended in Dec. 2004. Final Solution was offered free to Anhad for their campaigns; it was included in their anthology titled "In defence of our dreams". Subscribers of several journals/mags also got a copy of the film free of cost. These included Communalism Combat (Ed : Teesta Setalvad and Javed Anand), Samayik Varta (Ed : Yogendra Yadav), Janmat and several smaller journals.

Final Solution was rejected by the government-run Mumbai International Film Festival, but was screened at 'Vikalp: Films for Freedom', organised by the Campaign Against Censorship. Rakesh Sharma has been an active member of the Campaign since its inception.

A pilot movement to copy-and-redistribute the movie was held, briefly to protest the censoring of the movie screenings. The film has been screened on BBC, NHK, DR2, YLE and several other channels. It is yet to be shown on Indian television.

== Awards for Final Solution ==
- National Film Award – Special Jury Award (non-feature film) in 2005
- Wolfgang Staudte award (now rechristened the Golden Bear for Best Debut), Berlinale
- Special Jury Award (Netpac), Berlin International film festival
- Humanitarian Award for Outstanding Documentary, HongKong International film festival
- Montgolfiere d’Or (Best Documentary) & Le Prix Fip/Pil’ du Public, Festival des 3 Continents at Nantes (France)
- Best Documentary, Apsara Awards (Indian Film industry awards)
- Best Film, Freedom of Expression awards by Index on Censorship (UK)
- Silver Dhow, Zanzibar International film festival
- Human Rights Award, Docupolis (Barcelona)
- Special Jury Award, Mar Del Plata Independent film festival (Argentina)
- Special Jury Awards, Karafest (Karachi), Worldfest (Houston) and Film South Asia (Kathmandu)
- Special Jury Mentions, Munich Dokfest and Bangkok International filmfest
- Nominee, Best Foreign Film, Grierson Awards (UK)
- Special Award by NRIs for a Secular and Harmonious India (NRI-SAHI), NY-NJ, USA
- Special Award by AFMI, USA-Canada

== See also ==
- India: The Modi Question ― 2023 two-part BBC documentary series about Narendra Modi and his relationship with the Muslim minority

== Sources ==
- "Final Solution: Rare footage in the award winning documentary on Godhra riots (Watch Video)". India.com.
- "I was assaulted, says Rakesh Sharma". Hindustan Times. 8 February 2006.
- "Filmmakers Return Their National Awards To Protest Against Rising Violence". The Wire.
- "Winners announced for the 2005 Index Free Expression Awards". humanrightshouse.org. 4 March 2005.
- "Final Solution won two more international awards at 3 Continents at Nantes". www.filmfestivals.com.
- "Film card". torinofilmfest.org.
- "India bans religious riot movie". news.bbc.co.uk. 6 August 2004.
- "Film on Gujarat riots wins two awards in Berlin". The Economic Times - The Times of India. 17 February 2004.
- ""Final Solution" by Rakesh Sharma - 4 different awards!". rec.arts.movies.local.indian.narkive.com.
- Chari, Mridula (28 October 2015). "As FTII students call off strike, Dibakar Banerjee and 11 other filmmakers will return their awards". Scroll.in.
- "Four PSBT films win at National Film Awards; 'Final Soultions [sic]' finally gets its due - Exchange4media". Indian Advertising Media & Marketing News – exchange4media. 11 August 2007.
- "Anupam Kher is lying. NDA govt banned 'Final Solution'. He was Censor Chief: Director Rakesh Sharma". DNA India.
- "Abolish Censor Board: Rakesh Sharma". Hindustan Times. 17 February 2006.
- outlookindia.com
- outlookindia.com
- http://www.columbia.edu/cu/cujsas/Volume%20I/John%20Fischer%20-%20Oppression2.pdf
