= Bhupendra Chandra Datta Bhowmik =

Indian journalist (1940 - 1997)

- ভূপেন্দ্র চন্দ্র দত্ত ভৌমিক
- Born: 19 February 1940
- Died: 9 September 1997 (aged 57)
- Citizenship: India
- Occupations: Journalist, writer
- Known for: Founder of Dainik Sambad, role in Bangladesh Liberation War
- Awards: Friends of Liberation War Honour" winner posthumously in 2012 from Bangladesh for his outstanding contributions in the Bangladesh Liberation War, Winner of "Atal Bihari Vajpayee Lifetime Achievement Award" in 2023

Bhupendra Chandra Datta Bhowmik (19 February 1940 – 9 September 1997), also known as Bhupen Datta Bhowmik or Bhupen Datta Bhaumik or Bhupen Dutta Bhowmik, was an Indian Bengali journalist from Agartala, Tripura. He was the founder and chief editor of the Bengali language daily newspaper Dainik Sambad. He was awarded "Friends of Liberation War Honour" posthumously in 2012 from Bangladesh for his outstanding contributions in the Bangladesh Liberation War and Atal Bihari Vajpayee Lifetime Achievement Award in 2023 for his journalism career and literary works.

His wife, Mira Datta Bhowmik, died on 24 June 2023 in Agartala. They were the parents of three sons (Birat, Kuber and Kaniska) and one daughter (Durba).

== See also ==
- List of Indian journalists
- Bengali-language newspapers
