= David Bond (journalist) =

British sports journalist

David Bond is an English journalist who was sports editor of BBC News from 2009 to 2014.

Bond began his journalistic career on the South London Press covering Millwall F.C., the football club he supports. Bond then became sports news correspondent at the Sunday Times, before being appointed deputy sports editor at the Evening Standard. Bond was appointed the BBC's Sport Editor in 2009, replacing Mihir Bose.

Bond's reporting of the men's cycling road race at the London 2012 Olympics on 28 July attracted criticism from many viewers. After the race, in which British cyclists failed to win a medal, he asked British pre-race favourite Mark Cavendish, "Was Tour de France tiredness a factor?", to which Cavendish responded, "Stop asking stupid questions. Do you know anything about cycling?".

Bond joined the Miltown public relations agency in 2014. Dan Roan succeeded him as the BBC Sports Editor.

In October 2017, Bond returned to journalism as Security and Defence Editor of the Financial Times.

Media offices
Preceded by Mihir Bose	Sports Editor of the BBC; 2009-2014	Succeeded by Dan Roan
