= EVF =

EVF may refer to:

- Ekal Vidyalaya, a non-profit organization involved in education and village development in India
- Electronic viewfinder
- Erythrocyte volume fraction
- Edgeley Volunteer Force, a hooligan firm in Stockport
