= IDRF =

IDRF may refer to:

- International Diving Regulators Forum
- India Development and Relief Fund, American charity that supports development projects in India
