= Manoj Joshi =

Manoj Joshi may refer to:

- Manoj Joshi (actor) (born 1965), Indian film and television actor
- Manoj Joshi (journalist) (active from 1987), Indian journalist and author
- Manoj Joshi (commentator), Indian sports journalist, author and TV commentator
