= Teesta (disambiguation) =

Teesta may refer to:

- Teesta River—the second largest river after the Ganges in Jalpaiguri, West Bengal, India
- Tista River, Norway—a river in the municipality Halden, Norway
- Teesta Setalvad—a human and social rights worker based in Bombay
- MV Teesta, a coaster
