= BLSP =

BLSP may refer to:

- Barnegat Lighthouse State Park, New Jersey, USA
- Bear Lake State Park (Utah), USA
- Beaver Lake State Park (North Dakota), USA
- Bharat Lok Shiksha Parishad, a charity in India
- British Light Steel Pressings, a former company
- Building Literacy in Sudan Project, part of the International Extension College
- Business Leaders for Sensible Priorities, a nonprofit organization composed of 700 business leaders
