= Sahar Zaman =

Sahar Zaman may refer to:

- Sahar Zaman (journalist), Indian journalist
- Sahar Zaman (footballer), Pakistani footballer
