= Friends of Tribals Society =

- India

Information
- Established: 1989

The Friends of Tribals Society (FTS), or Vanbandhu Parishad, is a volunteer organization formed in 1989 with the goal of improving literacy and health among the Adivasi, rural tribal people in India. The society operates one-teacher schools in the villages, led by trained members of the local community.

The FTS is associated with the Ekal Vidyalaya Foundation, which is active in fundraising abroad. FTS operates Ekal Vidyalayas in Assam, Orissa, Bihar, Jharkhand, Madhya Pradesh, Chhattisgarh, Maharashtra and Karnataka, while its sister organization Bharat Lok Shiksha Parishad (BLSP) operates in Uttar Pradesh, Uttarakhand, Himachal Pradesh, Haryana, Punjab and Jammu and Kashmir.

The schools (Ekal Vidyalyas) are led by a local person who is trained as a teacher. The curriculum is mainly basic literacy in the language of the state, but also introduces concepts of Hinduism, even in areas where that is not the main religion. An Ekal Vidyalaya teacher was killed by Naxalites for ignoring their directive not to teach Hindu culture. As of July 2003, the FTS was operating 6,966 schools with 222,775 students. By July 2007, the FTS and the Ekal Vidyalaya was operating over 23,000 schools. The FTS had the goal of operating 30,000 schools by 2011. The target was achieved and surpassed by March 2010 itself reaching 34,000 schools with 10,30,290 students.
