= Vaishali Dinakaran =

Indian motorsport journalist

Vaishali Dinakaran (born 11 October 1987) is an Indian motor sport journalist and writer. She graduated from a sub-editor to a motor sports editor in an Indian automotive publication, Overdrive. Now based in Berlin, Germany she continues to write on motor sports but uses a new medium. She is currently doing video news for Deutsche Welle. She is one of the few motor sports journalists who drove a Formula 1 car.

== Early life ==
Vaishali Dinakaran was born on 11 October 1987 in Bangalore to Thinakaran and Poornima Thinakaran. She's spent her early childhood in Bengaluru along with her sister Shoruba. After finishing her schooling in Sishu Griha, she studied communicative English at Mount Carmel College in Bengaluru. She finished her Bachelor of Arts in Media and Mass Communication in 2008. Before that in 2006, she did a couple of months internship with Overdrive magazine. She joined as a Copy Editor at Autocar India in June 2008.

== Motorsports journalism ==
After working for a year and five months at Autocar in Mumbai, Dinakaran moved to Business Standard Motoring as Principal Correspondent. In 2011, when Formula 1 came to India she became one of the few Indian Journalists who managed a one-on-one interview with Formula One legend Michael Schumacher. She covered many rallies alongside veteran motorsports photographer and journalist George Francis.

From April 2013 to July 2020, she took care of the motor sports news in Overdrive as Motorsports Editor. Though she moved to Germany in 2015, she continued to edit the motor sports section of the reputed magazine run by Network18 Group. In 2020, she joined Deutsche Welle and has been exploring the digital media through video news features.

== Awards ==
Vaishali Dinakaran won the prestigious ‘ProDrive Motorsports Award’ for the years 2018, 2019 and 2024 presented by The Guild of Motoring Writers for her motorsports writing. One of the articles that was cited for the award was an Opinion piece, ‘Pacenotes’, the column in Overdrive which she started writing from August 2014.
