= Ekal Vidyalaya =

One Teacher School Initiative in India

Ekal Vidyalaya Foundation
- Abbreviation: EVF
- Formation: 1986
- Founder: Bhaurao Deoras; Shyam Gupta
- Location: India, United States
- Website: www.ekal.org

Ekal Vidyalaya Foundation (transl. Singularity School Foundation; abbr. EVF) is the principal organisation of the Ekal Abhiyan project, a one teacher school initiative in India. The foundation operates under the umbrella organisation of Ekal Abhiyan Trust and has a number of associated organisations called the Friends of Tribals Society (FTS), Shree Hari Satsang Samiti (SHSS), Arogya Foundation of India (AFI), Grammotham Foundation (GF) and Ekal Sansthan (ES). EVF is actively involved in fund-raising activities in several countries outside India, most notably the United States, and is associated with the Rashtriya Swayamsevak Sangh. The Ekal Vidyalaya schools were assisted by the NDA Government from 1999–2000 onwards.

== Establishment and growth ==
The Ekal Vidyalaya Foundation was founded in Gumla district, Jharkhand in 1986. The one teacher schooling initiative was conceptualised by Bhaurao Deoras, the younger brother of the 3rd Sarsanghchalak of Rashtriya Swayamsevak Sangh (RSS), Madhukar Dattatraya Deoras. The organisation was developed on Bhaurao's vision by a senior functionary of the RSS named Shyam Gupta.

In the 1990s, global support networks were established. The Ekal Vidyalaya Foundation of India was officially registered in 2000 and the EVF-USA was registered soon after.

As of August 2020, there were more than 102753 schools run by EVF, including 2,100 schools in the North Eastern states. The number of schools grew to 27,000 in 2010, 34,000 in 2011, 51,717 in 2013 and 1,02,753 by 2020. EVF's goal is to reach every child in the rural areas where education and school is a challenge. EVF is targeting to reach 2,00,00 village schools by 2030.

Ekal foundation of Nepal launched the program in 1996 and now the foundation is operating 2,310 primary schools imparting education to 60,995 students in 54 districts of Nepal.

EVF is associated with the Hindu nationalist organisations Vishva Hindu Parishad, which is in turn a member of the Sangh Parivar, the family of organisations run by the Rashtriya Swayamsevak Sangh (RSS). The foundation was headed in the past by Subhash Chandra, the Chairman of Essel Group and the founder of Zee TV. Hema Malini, Indian actress and danseuse, has served as the global brand ambassador for the Ekal Vidyalaya movement.

== Activities ==
=== Education ===
The Ekal Vidyalayas provide five years of free, non-formal education to children from the age group 6–14 years. A typical school has 30–40 students taught by a local youth who has passed grades 8 or 9 and has been specifically trained. A local organizer looks after a unit of 10 schools, called a "subcluster". Local people are also involved in higher organization levels like a "cluster" (unit of 30 schools), subarea (unit of 90 schools), and area (unit of 270 schools). The classes take place under a tree or in a hut and use informal modes like storytelling, folk dramas, folk songs, and religious discourses. Around half of the students and teachers are females, and about a fifth of the students go on to pursue higher education, some of which return to serve the foundation.

The schools are primarily organized in small villages among India's tribal groups. The local youth who are trained to operate the schools are social workers and teachers, teaching sanitation and health care, literacy, and self-sufficiency. Each school is run on an annual budget of around 20,000 Indian rupees. At the national level, the schools are organized by Ekal Vidyalaya Foundation of India. Regionally, Ekal Vidyalayas are run by the Friends of Tribals Society (FTS) and Bharat Lok Shiksha Parishad (BLSP) NGOs and by state-level groups such as Janahitha in Andhra Pradesh and Bharatiya Janseva Sansthan in Gujarat. In addition to teaching children, the schools hold weekly sessions for the village populace to discuss issues like rural development, health and awakening.

=== Other activities ===
Along with literacy, Ekal Vidyalaya schools also impart moral education. EVF works in tribal areas on health care education with the emphasis on hygiene, treatment of general diseases, maternal and child care. The foundation operates 11,450 health centers in India for people living in rural and tribal India.

The foundation distributes medicines to children for the treatment of various diseases. The schools also run a rural development scheme under which use of organic fertilizers is promoted in place of chemical fertilizers. Professional training in agriculture and vermiculture is provided. In May 2011, EVF launched the Vermicompost Project, a pilot project with an aim to introduce self-sustaining practices in 100 poor villages of Orissa and Maharashtra. In December 2011, the Ekal Vidyalaya staff resolved to raise voice against addiction in rural areas.

=== International fund raising ===
United States

The Ekal Vidyalaya Foundation of USA (EVF USA) is active in fundraising. In June 2008, the Atlanta chapter entertained guests with a music program at a fundraising event. In May 2009, the Southern California chapter launched its annual fundraising drive. A benefit concert in Chicago in July 2009 raised $160,000. In September 2009, the San Diego chapter raised about $14,000 at a cultural event featuring music and dance. The organisation announced that a similar event in Dallas in November 2009 had been very successful. In May 2010, a fundraising concert in Chicago was attended by over 600 people and raised pledges of $82,525. The same month, Ekal Vidyalaya raised almost $500,000 from five charity shows in the mid-Atlantic region. As of 2010, EVF USA had 34 active chapters and supported 9,500 out of the 34,343 Ekal Vidyalayas in India. The foundation raised US$3.5 million in 2010. EVF USA organises fundraising programs in 45 cities in the United States, which feature Indian singers or marathons.

Other countries

EVF Australia was set up in 2004. It received the Tax exemption for donation in 2007. As of June 2015 EVF Australia has sponsored 850 Ekal schools. In 2006, the National Hindu Students' Forum (UK) selected Ekal Vidyalaya as the main recipient of fundraising during its annual Sewa Week drive. EVF has around 1,000 donors in Hong Kong.

== Recognition and awards ==
=== Recognition ===
EVF's single-teacher school concept and their contribution towards literacy and empowerment in the rural and tribal areas have been praised by several state governments and social organisations in India. Avinash Kaushik, American entrepreneur and author, wrote that foundations like the Smile Train, Doctors Without Borders and Ekal Vidyalaya have done "incredible work" and "they make the world a better place". Digital Learning, a magazine on education, described the non-formal education experiment by EVF in Jharkhand from 1986 to 1995–96 as "extraordinary", noting that literacy rate in Jharkhand doubled in this period, and diseases caused by unhygienic practices, witchcraft and alcoholism declined sharply. The National Rural Health Mission (NRHM), a program for health care in rural India run by the Ministry of Health and Family Welfare, approached EVF for imparting healthcare training to women. EVF developed the women-centric "Asha" programme for NRHM in response.

According to A Factual Response to the Hate Attack on the India Development and Relief Fund (IDRF), Yvette Rosser, American author and scholar, wrote that the Ekal Vidyalaya program has done "incredible work" and "brought literacy to millions of India's children who otherwise would not know how to read and write". Raman Singh, the Chief Minister of Chhattisgarh, praised the work done by Ekal Vidyalayas run by the FTS in 2500 tribal villages of the state in spreading education. In 2009, Yoga guru Swami Ramdev said at the Ekal International Conference in Delhi that the Ekal Vidyalayas are a medium for definite service to God.

=== Awards ===
- 2009. The 7th Meri Dilli Award (My Delhi Award) in the field of literacy by the NNS Media Group, conferred by Yoganand Shastri, the Speaker of the Delhi Legislative Assembly.
- 2008–09. Best NGO Award for transparency and administration.
- 2007–08. Utkrishtata Samman (Highest Award) by Bharat Vikas Parishad (India Development Council), conferred by retired Indian judges "for excellent services towards empowerment of Vanvasis and villagers."

== Controversy and criticism ==
=== Suspension of government funding ===
In 2005, a report prepared by an inquiry committee of the Indian Ministry of Human Resource Development found that in some Ekal Vidyalaya schools the names of enrolled students had been copied from registers of government-run schools. The schools did not provide reading and learning material, and used funds to "generate hatred toward minorities, and condition the minds of children". The report said the FTS was "misusing these funds, and using the grants for creating disharmony amongst religious groups and creating a political cadre". In May 2005 the Indian government stopped grants to the schools based on this report. Quoting from the report in The Milli Gazette, Mukundan C. Menon noted that the English booklet used to teach second year students in Jharkhand omitted six letters of the alphabet. Menon said the reason was names of Hindu Gods beginning with these letters are not common.

=== Criticism ===
In 2002, Sabrang Communications and South Asia Citizens Web published a report named The Foreign Exchange of Hate – IDRF and the American Funding of Hindutva on utilisation of funds by India Development and Relief Fund. The report alleged the VHP-run Ekal Vidyalaya schools had the goal of "Hinduizing" tribals and spreading hatred against Indian minorities. In 2005 John Dayal, then president of the All India Catholic Union (AICU) and a member of the National Integration Council expressed concern that the schools were spreading hatred towards members of the Christian minority, in order to "prevent conversions of tribals to Christianity by missionaries." In a 2008 article Angana Chatterji, associate professor of anthropology at California Institute of Integral Studies, identified Ekal Vidyalaya Foundation of USA as one of the charities in the US that had allocated money "disproportionately directed to Hindutva-affiliated groups". In an article in the Daily Times of Pakistan, Khalid Hasan described the Ekal Vidyalayas as having a "curriculum steeped in instilling hatred against non-Hindu religious minorities". Rights activists have claimed that the schools pursue a Hindu-nationalist agenda and generate hatred towards non-Hindu minorities such as Christians.

=== Response to criticism ===
In response to the 2002 report published by Sabrang Communications, in March 2003 Ramesh Rao, professor of Communication at Truman State University, and others wrote a report named A Factual Response to the Hate Attack on the India Development and Relief Fund (IDRF). In this report, they wrote that "there has been a concerted campaign against the Ekal Vidyalayas by a combination of media and academic networks ... try as they might, they really cannot find anything wrong with the schools". According to Prakash Sharma, media convener of the Vishwa Hindu Parishad, "The Ekal Vidyalayas are our effort to reach the most deprived areas of the country. Christian missionaries get funds from all over the world: the entire Christian empire backs them. Ours is a completely indigenous effort". François Gautier, French author and journalist, described the Ekal Vidyalayas as "a harmless programme doing wonderful job for tribal children", and questioned why organisations raising funds for them were attacked. A Factual Response to the Hate Attack on the India Development and Relief Fund (IDRF) quotes Yvette Rosser as saying that "the ladies and gentlemen in the villages who teach in Ekal Vidyalaya schools are not teaching hate". A Factual Response to the Hate Attack on the India Development and Relief Fund (IDRF) notes that several other authors have praised the schools' role in providing literacy to millions of children, and stated that the schools do not teach hate but have themselves been the target of a campaign by media and academic networks.

== See also ==
- Akhara
- Friends of Tribals Society
- Akshaya Patra Foundation
- Gurukula
- Education in India
- Literacy in India
- Rashtriya Swayamsevak Sangh
- Vanavasi Kalyan Ashram
- Vidya Bharati
- Pratap Chandra Sarangi
