= Subal Kumar Dey =

Indian journalist

- Citizenship: India
- Occupation: Journalist
- Known for: founder of Syandan Patrika ( founded on 15 August 1970), "Syandan TV" (news channel, founded on 17 January 2022)
- Spouse: Kalyani Dey (died on 23 February 2020)

Subal Kumar Dey is an Indian journalist from Agartala, Tripura. He is the founder and chief editor of the Bengali language daily newspaper Syandan Patrika and Syandan TV, a news channel. He is the current president of Tripura Newspapers' Society (TNS), Agartala Press Club, and member of Friends (a Tripura cricket club).

== Personal life ==
He was born into an Indian Bengali family. Kalyani Dey, former Agartala municipal councilor, was his wife. She died on 23 February 2020.

Drohokal is his Bengali language autobiography published in 2019. It tells the story of his 50 years in journalism.

== See also ==
- List of Indian journalists
