= BBC Sports Editor =

Sports journalism post

The post of BBC Sports Editor was established in October 2006. The first incumbent was Mihir Bose. Bose resigned in August 2009. He was succeeded in December 2009 by David Bond. Bond resigned in May 2014. The current incumbent (since September 2014) is Dan Roan.
