= Agartala Press Club =

Agartala Press Club (Bengali: আগরতলা প্রেস ক্লাব) is the professional club for journalists of Tripura located in the capital Agartala. The current president is Subal Kumar Dey and the General Secretary is Pranab Sarkar.
