= Syandan Patrika =

Indian newspaper

- Type: Daily newspaper
- Format: Broadsheet
- Owner: Syandan Group of Publications
- Publisher: Subal Dey
- Editor-in-chief: Subal Dey
- Associate editor: Amit Bhowmik, Abhishek Dey, Bhupal Chakraborty, Sanjoy Shyam
- News editor: Rakkit Debnath
- Photo editor: Arindam Dey
- Founded: August 15, 1970; 56 years ago
- Political alignment: Independent
- Language: Bengali
- Headquarters: Syandan Bhavan, 91, Sakuntala Road, Agartala-799 002.
- Circulation: 69,340 copies
- Price: Rs.5.00

Syandan Patrika (Bengali: স্যন্দন পত্রিকা) is an Indian Bengali language daily newspaper published from Tripura, India. It was founded and is currently managed by Subal Kumar Dey.

== History ==
Syandan Patrika was first published as a weekly newspaper on 19 August 1970. It became a daily newspaper in 1974.

== Company ==
It has over 60 journalists and over 15 photojournalists in the state. Subal Kumar Dey's son Arindam Dey is the Photo Editor and manager of Syandan Patrika. The headquarters is in Agartala, Tripura, India, 12 km south of Agartala Airport. It also has offices in Kolkata, New Delhi, Bangalore, Ahmedabad, Guwahati, Mumbai, Chennai, Kanpur, Punjab, Haryana, Uttarakhand, Pune and Kanpur.

== Policy ==
The paper's editorial line is politically and economically liberal, and it is known for its anti-establishment tone. The paper has often carried investigative reports. One of its campaigns contributed to the passage of the Right to Information Act of 2005.

== Syandan TV ==
Subal Kumar Dey founded a news channel, Syandan TV, on 17 January 2022. It is the sister project or company of Syandan Patrika. But, it is facing some troubles now for its protesting nature.

== See also ==
- List of journalists killed in India
- List of Indian journalists
- Sudip Datta Bhaumik
