= Rakesh Sharma (filmmaker) =

Indian film director (born 1964)

- Born: Rakesh Sharma; 1964 (age 61–62); Uttar Pradesh, India
- Occupations: Documentary film maker, Television Journalist
- Years active: 1985–present

Rakesh Sharma (born 1964) is an Indian documentary filmmaker. His most notable work is the feature-length documentary Final Solution on the 2002 Gujarat riots. Rakesh Sharma spent his formative years in Agra, before moving to Delhi to finish his school and college education. He started his career as television journalist in 1986.

== Early career ==
Kumar graduated from SRCC, University of Delhi in 1984 with a BA Honors (Economics) degree. He studied MA in Mass Communication from Jamia Millia Islamia MCRC in 1986.

In 1986, he established Newstel, a Delhi-based news agency supplying features and stories to the state broadcaster - Doordarshan (DD). Between 1987 and 1989, he served as an Assistant Director on Shyam Benegal's "Discovery of India/Bharat Ek Khoj," a series consisting of 53 episodes shot on 35mm film, amounting to 270 reels.

In 1990, Kumar co-directed "Ringmasters," a special investigative documentary commissioned by DD, which examined the use of money and muscle power during Indian elections. This film was banned by DD and never shown. In 1991, he co-produced and co-directed "Democracy in Crisis," a film aired on Channel 4 in the UK as part of the series "South." The documentary explored the transition in Indian politics, marked by the collapse of the centrist Congress party and the emergence of new political formulations based on caste and religion.

In 1992, he produced and directed "Beaches of India," a 20-minute film commissioned by HT Media for the Ministry of Tourism. This film, featuring no spoken words or text slides, relied solely on an elaborate music and sound effects track. It was shot by Navroz Contractor in locations such as the Andamans, Lakshadweep, Puri-Konark, Mahabalipuram and Goa.

From 1993 to 1994, Kumar produced and directed the series "Legends" for Zee TV, which aired under the title "Sitaron ka Karvan." The series began with a four-episode biopic on Ashok Kumar, Bollywood's first major star, followed by a three-episode biopic on Shammi Kapoor. Rakesh gave up documentary film making in 1992, as “projects funded by international broadcasters and agencies always came with strings attached, however benign and I had no interest in making commissioned Sarkari films”.

In 1992-93, following the Bombay riots in the aftermath of the Demolition of the Babri Masjid, Rakesh took a sabbatical from his career to run a relief camp in Jogeshwari East (Jhoola Maidan, near Gandhi Chawl, where the Bane family had been burnt alive inside their home). As a full-time Nivara Haqq volunteer for several months, Rakesh ran the camp and worked with both the communities on relief, rehab and preliminary legal work, including filing FIRs, compensation claims, etc. Rakesh then moved to the corporate side of broadcasting for the next 7–8 years, before returning to self-financed, independent film-making in 2001-02.

- 1994: Head of Shows, Channel [V], an edgy music channel, as a part of the 3-member core team to launch the channel.
- 1995: Moved to StarPlus with a brief to Indianize and relaunch the channel. Initially as Commissioning Editor, and then as Head, Star Plus (India).
- 1996: Moved into Network Planning (India and Middle East), Star TV (Asian TV networks)

After quitting Star in 1997, Rakesh took up large production consultancy and TV channel launch/ relaunch projects. These included the mega Polls’98 results show (72 hours live, DD1 and DD2; last of the ‘manual count’ elections) as the Executive Producer in charge of the show. A joint venture between Prasar Bharti and India Today group. Rakesh moved to Chennai in 1999 to relaunch Vijay TV now known as Star Vijay, a Tamil channel. The 8-month consultancy included finalizing programming strategy, channel re branding, commissioning fresh shows for the entire prime time band, recruitment and training of staff (Programming, in-house production, on-air promos etc.). Rakesh finally quit broadcasting altogether in 2000 to return to film-making. It was while working on his first screenplay that he decided to accompany a friend to Kutch for relief work following the Jan 2001 approach, triggering his accidental return to documentary film-making with Aftershocks, initially planned as an advocacy video cum field report to pressurize GMDC and Gujarat government into releasing relief and compensation money. Aftershocks was premiered at the Fribourg International Film Festival in Feb 2002, where it won the Best Documentary award.

== Final Solution ==
Sharma made waves with Final Solution, a documentary that presents the 2002 Gujarat riots as an anti-Muslim pogrom orchestrated by right-wing Hindu nationalists in Gujarat. Himself a Hindu, Sharma used primary sources — testimony from both victims and perpetrators — to allege that the state was complicit in the violence.

== Ban on Final Solution ==
The film was denied certification in July 2004. But, following widespread civil society protests, Central Board of Film Certification (CBFC) convened an unusual suo moto screening, as the filmmaker refused to reapply or approach the Revising Committee, on the grounds that the Examining Committee preview panel was politically partisan, and did not even bother to see the film in its entirety, before effectively banning it. In October 2004, after a special Revising Committee preview convened by Chairman, CBFC, the film was cleared by the Censor Board without a single cut. Final Solution won the President’s Award (Special Jury award) in 2006, underscoring what the filmmaker called “the schizophrenic nature of the State, (that first bans a film and then gives it an award)”. Curiously, the two state-run film festivals of India -International Film Festival of India and Mumbai International Film Festival never ‘selected’ or screened Final Solution. Nor did the state broadcaster, Doordarshan, mandated with showing national award winning films, ever telecast the film despite formal requests. International broadcasters who aired the film include BBC (Storyville), NHK, YLE, DR2 and several smaller TV stations in Europe, West Asia and Africa.

== Unusual distribution strategy ==
The battle for Final Solution was fought in the realm of public opinion. The strategy ensured that instead of the film being buried, it went viral. It also resulted in widespread public support and civil society protests that eventually created pressure on the Censor Board (CBFC) to re-examine the case. A week after the ban, 10,000 discs were bulk-replicated and launched in a Pirate-and-Circulate campaign (get a free copy if you promise to pirate and make at least 5 or more copies, urging those getting the ‘pirated’ copy to pirate it further). This campaign got a tremendous and widespread response, enabling the film to reach towns and villages no commercial DVD distributor could possibly have. Simultaneously, on the website, it was made clear that neither a formal permission nor a screening fee was necessary for any India screenings. This led to hundreds of protest screenings at cultural spaces, in college hostels, trade union halls and community auditoria etc. On Oct 2, 2004, Gandhi’s birth anniversary, inspired by his Civil Disobedience campaign, a nationwide Show@Home initiative was launched by (Late) Himmatbhai Zaveri, an old Gandhian. Free DVDs were made available for over 200 such screenings countrywide, for home screenings for neighbors, family, colleagues and friends. Further, activist groups & grassroots networks were encouraged to use the film for advocacy, urging them as well to pirate-and-circulate the film. A tie-up with smaller journals, focusing on Democracy, Fundamentalism, Communal/ sectarian violence etc., offered free DVDs to their subscribers. It ensured targeted distribution to ground-level activists already working on the very issues the film explored. Some groups were even given the master tapes to prepare dubbed versions in regional languages (Tamil, Kannada, Gujarati etc.). Finally, the film was also uploaded for free viewing, in the limited spaces available online in 2004-5, as well as on institutional intranet servers at Indian universities, technical colleges, management institutes and even BPO call centers! That’s how the film went viral even before the ban was officially lifted.

== Filmography and related activities ==
Rakesh Sharma returned to documentary film-making after a decade, with the multiple award winning film Aftershocks: The Rough Guide to Democracy, a subaltern re-examination of the Narmada debate (Development at whose cost? For whose benefit?). Set in Kutch's lignite mining belt, the film probes democracy 'from below'. The film travelled to over 120 international film festivals, in addition to several universities and academic conferences. 2002-2006: After finishing and releasing Final Solution, Rakesh worked full-time on making other versions (including the Gujarati version), DVD sales and self-distribution of the film to broadcasters, institutions and film festivals etc.

In 2006-7, Rakesh decided to return for filming in Gujarat, for a long-term follow-up to his earlier work. Tentatively titled Final Solution Revisited, it is a mini-series of 3-4 films, each a complete feature-length documentary in itself. Apart from a classic follow-up of events, incidents and people featured in Final Solution, the series also examines several dimensions that could not possibly have been explored in the immediate aftermath. A notable focus of his subsequent probes is the fate of the riot foot soldiers, 5 and 10 years after the carnage. As well as over a dozen “karasevak” families whose loved ones died inside S-6, Sabarmati Express at Godhra, most of whom were abandoned soon after the massive BJP victory in the 2002 Gujarat elections.

In 2018, Rakesh was diagnosed with an autoimmune syndrome, after years of misdiagnosis since 2002, when he first started suffering seriously from debilitating issues. Though his travel and filming have been hampered after 2006, and near-totally so since 2013, he has still managed to film over 500 hours of material over the years, in Gujarat and elsewhere, probing the rise and entrenchment of Politics of Hate.

Though largely self-financed, in 2011, Rakesh turned to his audience and supporters with an appeal for crowdfunding, to help digitize his entire archive comprising all filmed and found material since the 2002 Gujarat carnage, as the original mini DV tapes had begun to deteriorate. Thanks to their generous and timely support, nearly 90% of the archival footage and stock was successfully digitized. Edited sequences from this footage, along with excerpts from Final Solution, were released by the filmmaker in 2013-14.

== 2014 Modi video releases ==
In 2014, Rakesh released a number of video clips of Indian Prime Ministerial candidate Narendra Modi from his election speeches for the 2003 election. In these clips, Modi allegedly appeared to endorse the violence perpetrated against Muslims in the 2002 Gujarat riots. Rakesh stated that he released those clips because Modi's early speeches had been gradually disappearing from online repositories due to a concerted whitewash campaign to improve Modi's image that could possibly be tarnished by his endorsements of the riots.

== Award for Final Solution ==
- National Film Award – Special Jury Award (non-feature film) in 2005
- Wolfgang Staudte award (now rechristened the Golden Bear for Best Debut), Berlinale
- Special Jury Award (Netpac), Berlin International film festival
- Humanitarian Award for Outstanding Documentary, Hong Kong International film festival
- Montgolfiere d’Or (Best Documentary) & Le Prix Fip/Pil’ du Public, Festival des 3 Continents at Nantes (France)
- Best Documentary, Apsara Awards (Indian Film industry awards)
- Best Film, Freedom of Expression awards by Index on Censorship (UK)
- Silver Dhow, Zanzibar International film festival
- Human Rights Award, Docupolis (Barcelona)
- Special Jury Award, Mar Del Plata Independent film festival (Argentina)
- Special Jury Awards, Karafest (Karachi), Worldfest (Houston) and Film South Asia (Kathmandu)
- Special Jury Mentions, Munich Dokfest and Bangkok International film fest
- Nominee, Best Foreign Film, Grierson Awards (UK)
- Special Award by NRIs for a Secular and Harmonious India (NRI-SAHI), NY-NJ, USA
- Special Award by AFMI, USA-Canada
