= Sanjay Pugalia =

Indian journalist

Sanjay Pugalia is a veteran Indian political and business journalist with print and broadcast experience who is the former editor-in-chief of CNBC Awaaz in Mumbai, India. He was hired as a senior news director by several start-up Hindi-language news channels at their launching, including Star News and CNBC Awaaz. He is the Editorial Director of The Quint as of 2021.

He is the CEO & Editor in Chief - Media Initiatives in Adani Enterprises.

Star News and now CNBC Awaaz—all of which competed against Doordarshan, India's public television network, and its DD News. The independent TV channels gave Hindi-language journalism in India a visible platform from which to compete against English-language journalism, which created a shift toward Hindi during this era.

== Personal ==
Sanjay Pugalia grew up in Sahibganj, Jharkhand, where his father was a businessman. Pugalia has university degrees in history and political science. During his student years, he read a magazine called Ravivaar, which was edited by Surendra Pratap Singh and Pugalia says this Hindi-language publication influenced him to begin a career in journalism. He is listed as a founding member of the Foundation for Media Professionals, which is a journalism association for all professionals regardless of format.

== Career ==
In more than 25 years as a journalist, Sanjay Pugalia has worked in both print and broadcast journalism. He has worked with The Times Group, Business Standard, Aaj tak, Zee News, Star News, and CNBC Awaaz. While he has worked in Hindi and English journalism, he has primarily been a Hindi-language journalist.

=== Print ===
He began his career as a journalist with the leading Hindi daily Navbharat Times, an outlet of The Times Group, in 1982 and stayed for 10 years. As a young correspondent, Pugalia filed a number of investigative reports involving big corporate houses between 1986 and 1991. He was the youngest person to be made special correspondent in the Times Group. He left Navbharat Times for the Business Standard, an English newspaper, where he worked for three years and was deputy bureau chief.

=== Television ===
During the 1990s, Pugalia contributed to BBC Hindi Service's programmes.

He worked for TV Today Network. In 1996, Pugalia was appointed as associate executive producer with a newly launched Hindi television news show on the network's Aaj Tak channel. S.P. Singh, who had earlier influenced Pugalia, was behind Aaj Tak. During this time, Pugalia first became known among Indians for his live anchoring of election programmes in Hindi. He later left Aaj Tak for Nine Broadcasting, until it went out of business, and he was hired as the executive director of Zee News

He left to become news director for Star TV in mid-2002 and work with former colleague from Nine Broadcasting Ravina Raj Kohli, who was president of news, when Star launched its own 24-hour news channel. While a director at STAR News, he developed more consumer-oriented news programming in prime time shows. But he was there for only a short time in 2002 before the owner shuffled the staff.

Since 2004, he has worked with CNBC-TV18, which launched in 2005. Five years later, he won an award for best news show host and said, "CNBC Awaaz has taken business news in Hindi into the mainstream of news on business. CNBC Awaaz has widened its reach and was able to attract viewers ..." With its emphasis on consumer news, CNBC Awaaz by 2010 had increased its audience fourfold since launching.

== Notable reporting assignments ==
- While at India TV Today Network, Pugalia covered the 1999 protests at the World Trade Organization in Seattle, Washington.
- While at CNBC Awaaz, Pugalia has interviewed Indian politicians such as L. K. Advani, Narendra Modi, and Nitish Kumar. He interviewed Devdutt Pattanaik, who writes about mythology.

== Awards ==
- 2010 Suryadatta National Lifetime Award
- 2010 Indian News Broadcasting Award for Best Hindi News Show Host
