= Javed Anand =

Indian journalist

- Born: ca. 1950 (age 75–76); Mumbai
- Occupation: Journalist
- Known for: Communalism Combat, Sabrang Communications

Javed Anand (born ca. 1950) is an Indian journalist and civil rights activist who founded the Mumbai-based Sabrang Communications in 1993. He is married to Teesta Setalvad and they co-edit the monthly Communalism Combat.

== Early years ==
Javed Anand attended the Indian Institute of Technology, Bombay, graduating with a degree in metallurgical engineering in 1971. He worked for the Front for Rapid Economic Development of India, a social action group, then in 1971 became a writer for The Daily, a Mumbai-based tabloid newspaper in 1971. In 1983 he met Teesta Setalvad, who had just joined The Daily, and they married four years later.

== Sabrang Communications ==
Shortly after the Bombay riots of 1992–93 that followed the demolition of Babri Mosque in December 1992, Teesta Setalvad and Anand left their jobs with mainstream newspapers and launched Communalism Combat, a magazine dedicated to fighting the divisive forces that had led to the riots. They started Sabrang Communications to generate revenue to sustain Communalism Combat, which they foresaw as not being viable on its own strength. They started working for the magazine in mid-1993 and the first issue was published in August 1993.

The magazine struggled at first, with friends pitching in. The couple did occasional assignments. A show of Tumhari Amrita and some regular ads supported them. In the run-up to 1999 Lok Sabha elections, Communalism Combat created an ad campaign featuring 18 fact sheets/backgrounders pitched against the Sangh Parivar. This campaign was funded by the Congress, CPI, CPM and about 10 prominent individuals. BJP and RSS unsuccessfully petitioned to the Election Commission against this ad campaign. By 2003 the magazine was printing up to 10,000 copies monthly.

Sabrang Communications has published various widely discussed reports. In 1998 Sabrang published Damning Verdict: Report of the Srikrishna Commission on the riots in Mumbai in December 1992 and January 1993, and 12 March 1993 bomb blasts. Following ongoing communal violence in Gujarat, in 2000 Sabrang published Saffron on the rampage: Gujarat's Muslims pay for the Lashkar's deeds. In 2002, Sabrang and South Asia Citizens Web published The Foreign Exchange of Hate: IDRF and the American Funding of Hindutva, which investigated how funding raised by the India Development and Relief Fund (IDRF) in the USA was being distributed in India.

Anand was a founding member of Citizens for Justice and Peace. In October 2003, he was a participant in the first national meeting of "Muslims for Secular Democracy", and was chosen as General Secretary of the group. He continued to hold this position as of April 2011.

== Opinions ==
Anand writes columns for mainstream newspapers such as The Indian Express. As a columnist for the Asian Age he has written a number of articles on Muslim-related topics.

In January 2012 there were growing protests by Muslim organisations against a visit to India by controversial author Salman Rushdie. Javed Anand reminded Muslims of the approach taken by Sir Syed Ahmed Khan, founder of Aligarh Muslim University, in a similar situation. He noted that "Altaf Hussain Hali, who penned Sir Syed's biography, writes that Sir Syed never favoured hounding a writer who had blasphemed against the Prophet. So Sir Syed wrote a book to refute the charges of William Muir in the latter's blasphemous book The Life of Mahomet".

Talking of violence, he has said: "Put bluntly, do groups and organizations whose rights we defend themselves believe in democratic forms of mass mobilization? Is it ethically right and politically tenable that rights groups focus their entire attention on violations by state personnel but remain mum when 'militants' maim, rape or kill fellow citizens". Speaking of the 2008 terrorist attacks in Mumbai, Anand said: "They (terrorists) claim to be doing this in the name of Islam. We have to tell them, 'Not in our name'".

Talking of a police probe of radical Hindutva organisations in November 2008 he said "I can't see a serving IPS officer going after an army officer or saffron outfits unless these is concrete evidence". He has criticized Students Islamic Movement of India (SIMI), describing it as an extremist organisation that rejects democracy and secularism and espouses violence as a means to achieve a new Caliphate.

In a November 2009 article for this paper he criticized a UK-based Muslim charity for insisting that only Muslim willing to follow strict Shariah rules could receive their help. Writing in the Deccan Chronicle in April 2011 on the proliferation of Muslim parties he said "Ideologically speaking, it means secularism by daylight, Sharia after dark. Politically speaking, at best they'll cancel each other out; eat into votes of mainstream parties that swear by secularism. At worst, they'll provide propaganda fodder to Hindutva, feed Islamophobia".

In September 1998, Setalvad and Anand published a paper on Saffron Army Targets People of the Cross that documented forced conversions of Christians to Hinduism with the assistance of state agents.

== Legal issues ==
In January 2014 the Ahmedabad Crime Branch registered a First Information Report that alleged that Anand, his wife Teesta Setalvad and others had embezzled Rs.15 million intended for construction of a memorial for riot victims. They were accused of misusing funds they had collected for making a museum for the Gulbarg society. They denied wrongdoing and said the case had been filed with "ulterior political motive". In March 2014 a local court in Ahmedabad denied the couple anticipatory bail in the case. On 12 February 2015 the Gujarat High Court refused to grant anticipatory bail. Later that day the Supreme Court stayed the arrest of the couple in the alleged misappropriation case.

On 8 July 2015 the Central Bureau of Investigation (CBI) filed a case against Setalvad and her organization for accepting foreign funding without first obtaining permission from the Home Ministry, a violation of the Foreign Contribution Regulation Act. The filing also named Javed Anand and Gulam Mohammed Peshimam, both Sabrang directors. Setalvad told reporters she had assured the CBI she would cooperate fully with them, but had not been contacted by the CBI with any requests.
