= Gopikrishnan =

Gopikrishnan K.R.
- Born: THIKKODI Kerala, India
- Occupation: Cartoonist (Mathrubhumi)
- Spouse: Dr.Priya
- Children: 2

Gopikrishnan is the staff cartoonist of Mathrubhumi daily. Kakadrishty is his popular cartoon column.

== Awards ==
- Media Award for Best Cartoonist for the coverage of the 49th State School Youth Festival
- Kerala Lalit Kala Academy for Best Cartoonist award for 2017-2018
