= A Saye Sekhar =

Indian journalist, columnist, and political analyst

Saye Sekhar Angara
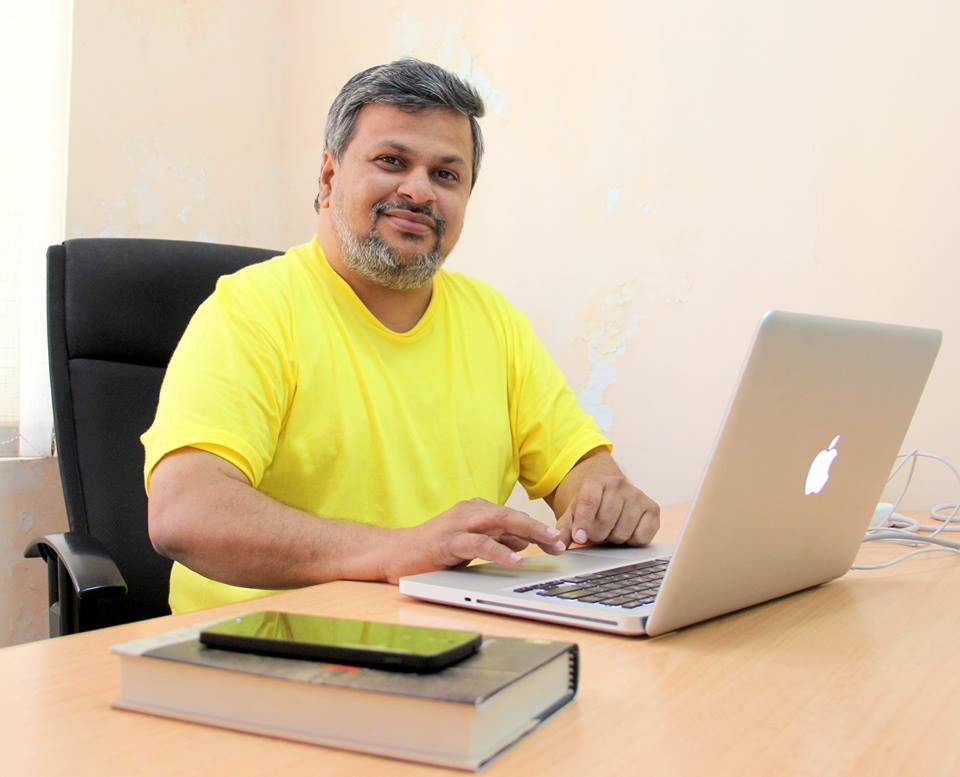
- Occupation: Journalist · columnist · political analyst
- Years active: 1988–present

A Saye Sekhar (born 10 September) is an Indian journalist, columnist, political analyst and author.

As an author, he writes commentaries on business, culture, and politics at news websites such as Firstpost and Catchnews. He was an editor of The Finapolis, a personal finance magazine. He was the Chief of Bureau and the Head of the Vijayawada edition of The Hindu, before leaving in September 2009.

== Background ==
In 1988, A Saye Sekhar received his B.Sc. degree in physics, mathematics, and chemistry from Andhra University, then took up journalism as a profession. After working with The Hindu, Deccan Chronicle, and The Hans India, he became an editor and consultant at TV5. He received his postgraduate degree in communication and journalism from Osmania University, Hyderabad.

== Career ==
Sekhar began his career as a journalist in late 1988 as a trainee sub-editor of Eenadu. He worked in the launch teams of district publication dailies which pioneered these supplements. In 1992, he served as the Head of the City Reporting Bureau at Newstime. He joined Deccan Chronicle as a Senior Political Correspondent in November 1993, at which he worked until August 1996.

Sekhar joined The Hindu and worked in different positions for more than six years, before he became Chief of Bureau and Head of Editorial. He moved to Hyderabad as a Business Editor of the newspaper. After he left The Hindu, Sekhar launched his own venture, ABDC Media & Communications Pvt Ltd, which currently operates as an HR and Placements Consultancy. He served as an Associate Editor/Senior Editor of Hyderabad's first afternoon daily, Postnoon.

Later, he consulted with TV5 for its mobile application and then moved to a startup. In 2003, he visited Chicago, as part of Rotary International's Group Study Exchange program, and several newspaper offices, including the Chicago Tribune.
