= Bharat Lok Shiksha Parishad =

Charity in India

Bharat Lok Shiksha Parishad (BLSP) is a charity in India that operates Ekal Vidyalayas, or single-teacher schools, under the Ekal Vidyalaya of India umbrella organization. BLSP operates in Uttar Pradesh, Uttarakhand, Himachal Pradesh, Haryana, Punjab and Jammu and Kashmir, while its sister organization the Friends of Tribals Society operates in Assam, Orissa, Bihar, Jharkhand, Madhya Pradesh, Chhattisgarh, Maharashtra and Karnataka.

Based in New Delhi, BLSP was established and registered in 1986 by young Vivekananda educationists who began to work with tribal people in the Jharkhand forests. Goals are to eliminate illiteracy among tribal people and improve their social and economic conditions. The organization has a target of establishing 100,000 Ekal Vidyalayas by 2013. BLSP was founded & registered on 3 March 2000 with a vision of bringing all round development to the remote tribal villages of India. The charity runs Ekal Yidyalayas, where a local youth teaches children aged 6 to 14 for three hours daily using a non-formal approach that includes songs, storytelling, games, art and yoga. The students and their parents are taught principles of health and hygiene. Villagers are trained in agricultural techniques, and are made aware of government schemes from which they may benefit.

JP Modi of Modi InfoSol, a New Delhi–based IT solution provider, is BLSP vice president. Modi has set himself the ambitious goal of building 3,000 girls schools in backward areas of Jammu, UP, Uttaranchal and Rajasthan in partnership with BLSP. In 2006, the Dhoot Group of real estate developers adopted 100 BLSP schools. In March 2008 BLSP launched its Ludhiana chapter, which would cater to Ferozepur district. This was the first chapter in the state of Punjab. Up to 240 Ekal schools were already being run by the parishad in this district. In October / November 2009, Bharat Lok Shiksha Parishad organized a three-day International Ekal Conference New Delhi. The conference was attended by about 13,000 delegates from India, America, Canada, England and elsewhere.

== See also ==
- Helpingminds
