= Mihir Bose =

British Indian journalist and author (born 1947)

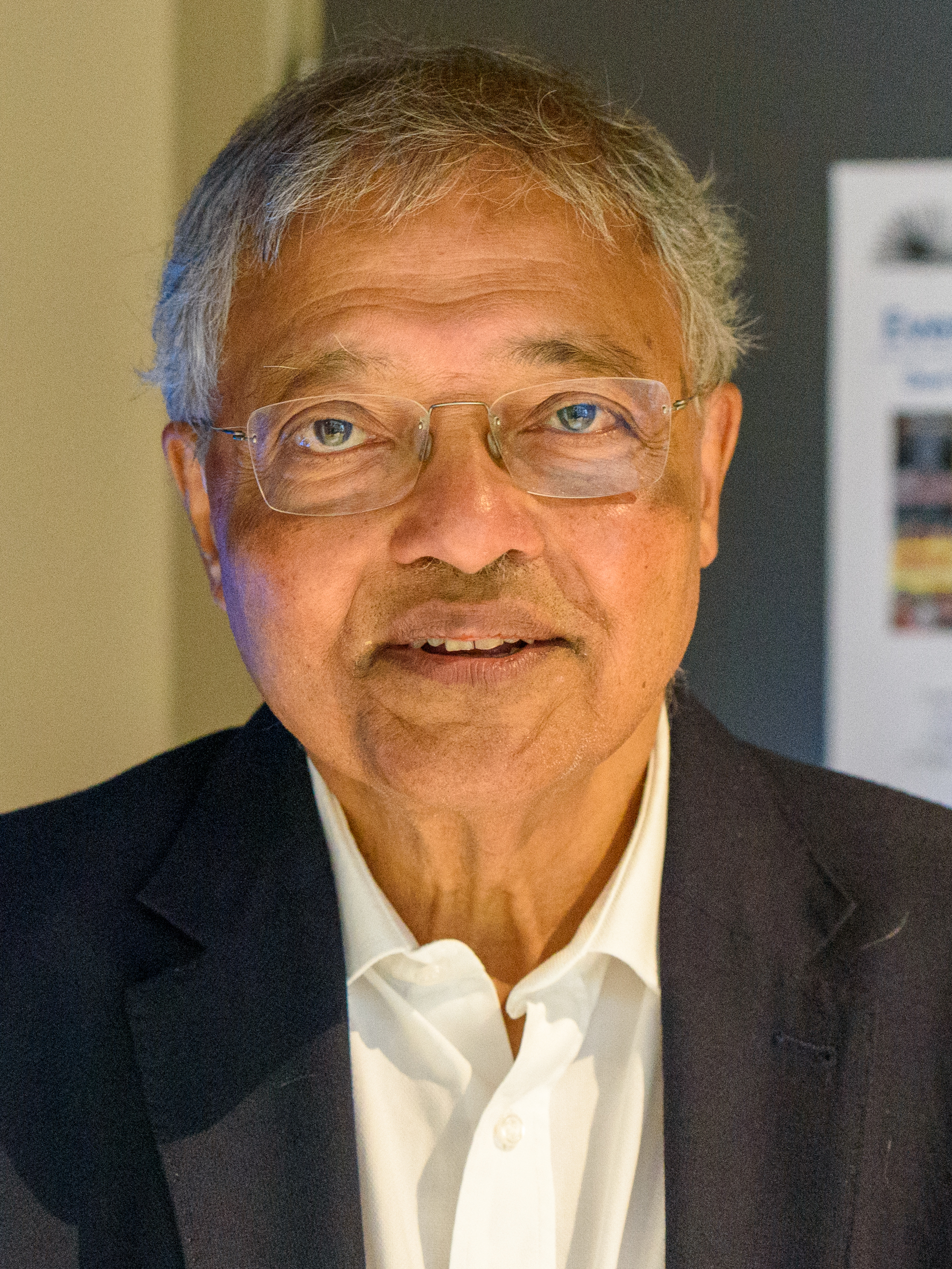
- Bose in 2022
- Born: 12 January 1947 (age 79); Calcutta, British India
- Education: Loughborough University
- Occupation: Journalist
- Writing career
- Genre: Non-fiction
- Subject: Sports

Mihir Bose (born 12 January 1947) is a British Indian journalist and author. He writes a weekly "Big Sports Interview" for the London Evening Standard, and also writes and broadcasts on sport and social and historical issues for several outlets including the BBC, the Financial Times and Sunday Times. He was the BBC Sports Editor until 4 August 2009.

He has written for most of the major UK newspapers and several business publications, presented programmes for radio and television, and written 26 books including a history of Bollywood and various books on football and cricket.

== Early life ==
Bose is of Indian origin. Born in Calcutta, he grew up in Bombay, now Mumbai. He went from India to the UK in 1969 to study engineering at Loughborough University. He took up accountancy and qualified as a chartered accountant in 1974.

== Early career ==
He started his journalistic career at LBC Radio, before writing for the Sunday Times. He gave up accountancy in 1978 to become a full-time journalist concentrating on business journalism but also writing about sport. He moved from business journalism to investigative sports reporting in the 1990s, editing the Inside Track column for the Sunday Times. He moved to the Daily Telegraph in 1995, where he started the paper's Inside Sports column.

== BBC ==
He left the Telegraph to become the BBC's sports editor in October 2006.

Bose has also presented on radio and television, including BBC Radio 4's Financial World Tonight, the South Asia Report on the BBC World Service and What the Papers Say for Channel 4.

His output as the BBC's head sports writer included a regular blog on the Corporation's website.

On 4 August 2009, Bose resigned from the BBC for personal reasons. It was reported that Bose was unhappy with the forthcoming move of the BBC Sport Department from London to Manchester, which would have required him to relocate. He was replaced as Sports Editor by David Bond.

== Blogging and other activities ==
Bose now writes a blog for the football-related website insideworldfootball.biz. He contributes a weekly "Big Interview" to the London Evening Standard.

He regularly broadcasts on radio and television in the UK and on overseas channels on sports, race, Indian politics and Commonwealth issues. He also blogs for PlayUp, a specialist sports outlet.

== Books ==
Bose has written 27 books and 15 collaborations on a range of subjects. His books include False Messiah: The Life and Times of Terry Venables (Andre Deutsch, 1997), A History of Indian Cricket (Andre Deutsch, 2002), Manchester Disunited (Aurum Press, 2007) and The Spirit of the Game (Constable, 2012). His History of Indian Cricket was the first book by an Indian writer to win the prestigious Cricket Society Literary Award in 1990. His study of sports and apartheid, Sporting Colours, was runner-up in the 1994 William Hill Sports Book of the Year award.

Bose has also written a book in the form of a comprehensive history of India's film industry called Bollywood: A History. Bose wrote The Aga Khans (published in 1984 by World's Work Ltd, The Windmill Press, Kingswood, Tadworth, Surrey), a work that unflatteringly detailed the lives of the first three Aga Khans. The 4th Aga Khan suppressed any further publication of the book by bringing legal action against Bose.

== Awards ==
Bose has won the following awards:

- 1990 Magazine Publishing Award – Winner Business Columnist of the Year
- 1990 Cricket Society – Silver Jubilee Literary Award Winner A History of Indian Cricket
- 1997 English Sports Council & Sports' Writers Association – Winner Inaugural Sports Story of the Year
- 1999 Sport England & Sports Writers' Association – Winner Sports News Reporter of the Year
- 2001 British Press Awards Finalist – Sports Reporter of the Year
- 2003 Asian Achievers Award / Asian Voice & Gujarat Samachar – Winner Media
- 2015 Lifetime Achievements Award - Asian Cricket Awards in London

== Personal life ==
Bose lives in west London with his wife, Caroline Cecil, who runs a financial PR consultancy. He has a daughter, Indira. He told Paddy O'Connell on Radio 4's Broadcasting House programme that he went to school with the Indian cricketer Sunil Gavaskar.

Media offices
Preceded by Position created	Sports Editor of the BBC; 2006–09	Succeeded by David Bond
