= Sabrang Communications =

Indian organization

- Formation: 1993
- Type: NGO
- Purpose: Combat communalism and caste-based discrimination
- Location: Mumbai
- Key people: Javed Anand; Teesta Setalvad
- Website: www.sabrangindia.in

Sabrang Communications is an organization founded in 1993 that publishes the monthly Communalism Combat magazine and that operates KHOJ, a secular education program, in schools in Mumbai, India. Communalism Combat is edited by Javed Anand and Teesta Setalvad. The Khoj programs try to help children to get past identity labels.

== Foundation ==
Javed Anand left his job as a Bombay-based journalist in the mainstream press and founded Communalism Combat in 1993 to fight religious intolerance and communal violence. His decision followed the December 1992 destruction of the Babri Mosque by Hindu fundamentalists. Communalism Combat first appeared in August 1993. Javed Anand and Teesta Setalvad, founders of Sabrang, are also founders of the NGO "Citizens for Peace and Justice", which fights communalism through the courts.

== Objectives and activities ==
Sabrang says its purpose is "to provide information on, analyse and expose the machinations of communal politics in India, on the subcontinent and abroad and to publicise the attempt of secular individuals, groups and organisations engaged in fighting them". Sabrang also aimed to create new books on Indian history as an alternative to official accounts that distort or truncate reality. Part of the objective would be to destroy traditional stereotypes. Another project begun in 1996 was named "Aman", which means "Olive Branch". It encouraged correspondence between Indian and Pakistani children as a way to start overcoming the hostility that has existed between the two countries since partition in 1947.

In 2006 the Ford Foundation gave a grant of $200,000 to Sabrang Communications "to address communalism and caste-based discrimination in India through active research, Web-based information dissemination, development of civil society networks and media strategies".

== Controversy ==
A report published in The Pioneer, whose editor Chandan Mitra was a member of the far-right Bharatiya Janata Party, on 28 June 2013 quoted unnamed sources as saying that significant amounts of money donated to the Sabrang Trust to help riot victims had been diverted to the bank accounts of Javed Anand and Teesta Setalvad, and to Sabrang Communications.

== Publications ==
In 1998 Sabrang published Damning Verdict: Report of the Srikrishna Commission on the riots in Mumbai in December 1992 and January 1993, and the 12 March 1993 bomb blasts. Following ongoing communal violence in Gujarat, in 2000 Sabrang published Saffron on the rampage: Gujarat's Muslims pay for the Lashkar's deeds. In 2002 Sabrang and South Asia Citizens Web published The Foreign Exchange of Hate: IDRF and the American Funding of Hindutva, which investigated how funding raised by the India Development and Relief Fund (IDRF) in the USA was being distributed in India. It found that most of the money went to Sangh Parivar for use in education, tribal or cultural activities. The report alleged that Ekal Vidyalaya one-teacher schools that the Vishva Hindu Parishad (VHP) had launched in the 1990s with funding from overseas charities had the goal of "Hinduizing" tribals and spreading hatred against Indian minorities.

The 2002 Sabrang report included a diagram that illustrated how the US/UK and Indian components of the sangh parivar were related. The report may have contributed to growing criticism of the Rashtriya Swayamsevak Sangh (RSS) by prominent overseas Indians, and to the decision by the US State and Justice departments to begin investigations of the IDRF for illicit donations and money laundering. The IDRF issued a counter-report denying the implied accusation in the Sabrang report that tribal activists, who had played a major role in the violence in Gujarat in 2002, were linked to US funding sources. In the rebuttal the IDRF said Hindutva was simply a framework for maintaining identity in societies where Hindus are small minorities.
