= Afshan Anjum =

Indian television journalist and anchor

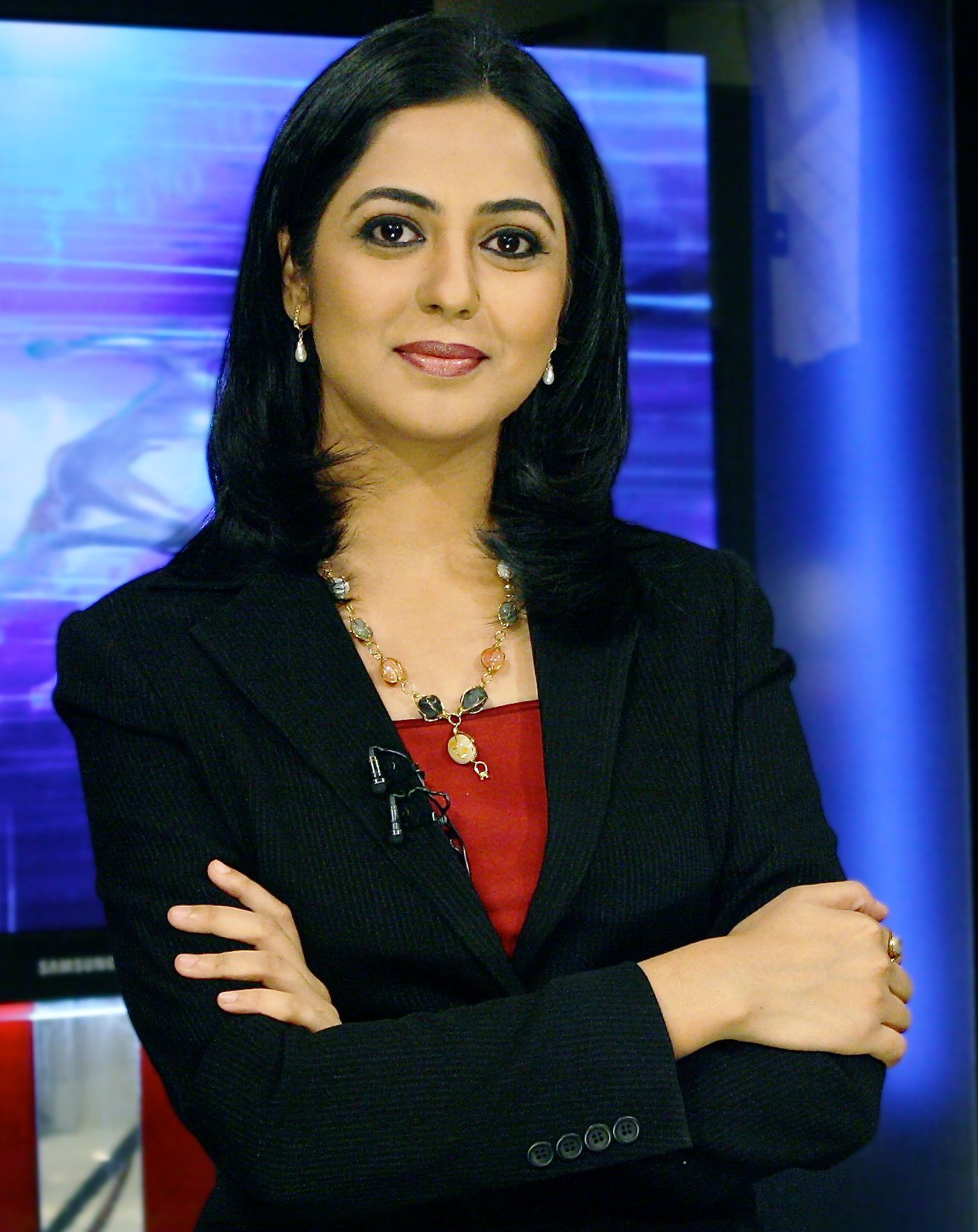
- Born: New Delhi, Delhi, India
- Education: Delhi University
- Spouse: Danish Aziz
- Presenting career
- Show: Googly
- Network: NDTV India
- Country: India
- Website: khabar.ndtv.com/topic/afshan-anjum

Afshan Anjum (Hindi: अफ़शां अंजुम) is an Indian television journalist and anchor. She worked as a senior news editor with NDTV India. Anjum is famous for her coverage of the ICC World Cup Cricket Tournaments, and hosts the daily sports shows Khel India and Googly on NDTV India. She has anchored the popular audience-based chat show Kissa Cricket Ka, and has won the NT Award five times.

== Personal life ==
Anjum was born in New Delhi. Her father worked at Avery India Ltd. She has two older brothers, one of them a scientist at the International Centre for Genetic Engineering and Biotechnology and another runs a business of his own. She is married to Danish Aziz, who works for UNICEF in Education. She currently lives in New Delhi.

== Career ==
Anjum has a bachelor's degree in journalism from Delhi University and was selected for the British Chevening Scholarships for Young Journalists of India in broadcast journalism with the Thomson Foundation at Cardiff University, Wales, United Kingdom in 2006. She started her career as a reporter with Aaj Tak and went on to join NDTV in 2003. Since then, she has worked her way up from being a reporter to senior news editor for sports.

She gained popularity with her show Kissa Cricket Ka with former Indian Cricketer Navjyot Singh Siddhu.

Anjum is recognized as a notable figure in Hindi language sports journalism in India. Throughout her career, she has reported on significant events in India's sporting history, such as the historic Tour of Pakistan in 2004 and the iconic ICC World Cup Cricket tournaments in 2007, 2011, and 2015.

== Awards and accolades ==
Anjum has won the NT Award for 'Best Sports Presenter in Hindi' five times between 2007 and 2014. She has also won several other prestigious awards such as the Madhav Jyoti Alankar.

She presented Jai Jawan with Cricketer MS Dhoni that won the ITA Award for 'Best Television Event'.
