= News18 India =

Indian television news channel

- Logo used since 2016
- Country: India
- Network: TV18
- Headquarters: New Delhi, India

Programming
- Language: Hindi
- Picture format: 16:9 (576i, SDTV)

Ownership
- Owner: Network18 Group
- Sister channels: Network18 Group channels

History
- Launched: 18 December 2005; 20 years ago
- Former names: IBN7

Links
- Website: hindi.news18.com

Availability

Streaming media
- News18 Live: India Live

News18 India is an Indian Hindi-language television channel owned by the Network18 Group. It was launched in 2005 as Channel 7 by Jagran Prakashan and acquired in 2006 by Network18 Group and rebranded IBN7. In 2016 it took its current name. In 2013, News18 India launched, on channel 520 on the UK's Sky TV platform News18, a live version of the parent channel. In 2014, News18 launched in the U.S.

The channel has been criticized as being a part of pro-Modi government "Godi media" news outlets.

== Select shows ==
- Aar Paar (lit. 'Across') - Hindi news show which aired daily with Amish Devgan as anchor.
- Desh Nahin Jhukne Denge (lit. 'Will Not Let the Nation Down') with Aman Chopra

== See also ==
- Network18 Group
- CNN-News18
