= Biju Govind =

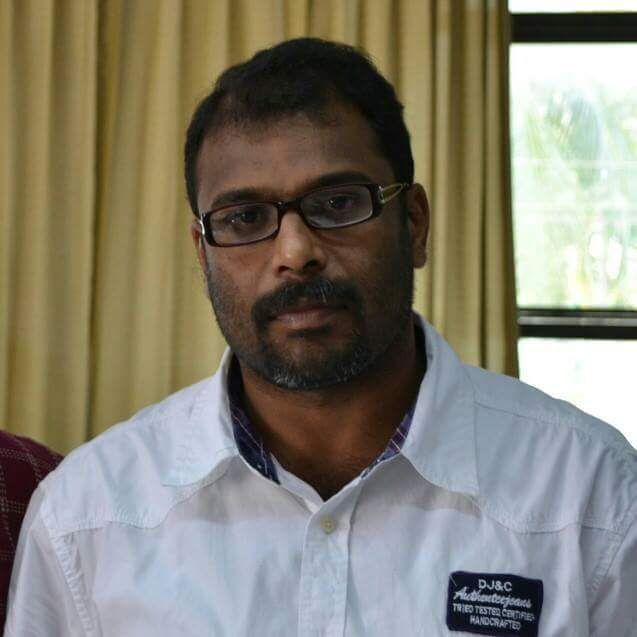
- Born: 14 June 1972 (age 54); Kayamkulam, Kerala, India
- Education: IJHS, Tangasseri
- Occupation: Journalist
- Spouse: Rajasree Govind
- Children: 2

Biju Govind is a Kerala-based journalist currently serving as the Chief of Bureau for The Hindu in Kozhikode. In this capacity, he oversees news coordination across the Malabar region. Throughout his career, he has reported extensively on a broad spectrum of critical issues, from political activism violence and communal unrest in North Kerala to the complex intersection of religion and civic life. A prolific writer, he frequently contributes analytical features and commentary on the State’s evolving political scape.

Govind first worked for the United News of India (UNI) in New Delhi, reporting on the solitary protest of a Tibetan woman, Sonam Dekyi seeking the release of her son (Ngawang Choephel) who had been arrested by the Chinese police on charges of espionage in 1997. He then joined The Indian Express in Thiruvananthapuram, and thereafter The New Indian Express out of Kochi.

Govind later moved to The Hindu, working from Kozhikode, in June 2001. He now covers politics, organized crime, development issues of roads, infrastructure, and realty. He has reported the Marad riots that occurred between Hindu and Muslim communities in Kozhikode in 2002 and the massacre of nine fishermen again at the seaside village in 2003. He had also covered the Muthanga agitation of Wayanad tribes against the government in 2002.

Govind reported the infiltration of Maoists in the tri-junction of Tamil Nadu, Karnataka and Kerala. He has also reported about the Indian Mujahideen in Kerala and Islamist modules that recruited Muslim youths for Islamic State fighters in Syria.
