= N. P. Rajendran =

N.P. Rajendran
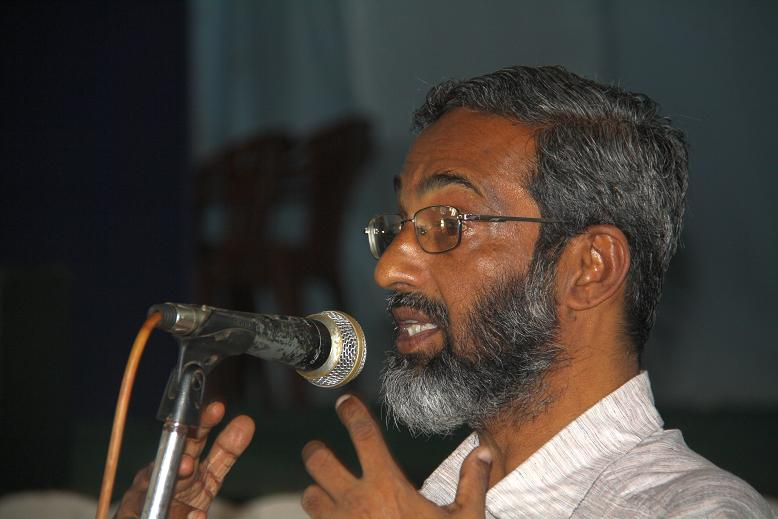
- Born: 6 November 1954 (age 71); Kozhikode, Madras State, India
- Occupations: Journalist, Chairman of Kerala Press Academy
- Years active: 1981–present

N. P. Rajendran is the chairman of Kerala Press Academy. He was appointed in August 2011. He is also the deputy editor of Mathrubhumi, a Malayalam daily, which he joined in 1981 after postgraduate studies in economics. N. P. Rajendran has prepared numerous investigative reports, which have won him several awards.

== Awards ==
- Vajrasooji award - 2001–02.
- The Santhi Madom Sneha Rajyam Media Awards 2008.
- K Balakrishnan award - 2010.
- New York India Press Club award - 2010.
- C.H. Mohammed Koya Journalism Awards for the year 2011.
