= Amish Devgan =

Indian Journalist and television news anchor (born 1980)

- Born: 1 March 1980 (age 46); New Delhi, India
- Education: PG in Mass Communication from Delhi University
- Occupations: Managing Editor at News18 India, Zee Media - 2014-2015
- Years active: 2002–present
- Organization: News18
- Notable credit(s): Debate show Aar Paar, Takkar

Amish Devgan (born 1 March 1980) is an Indian news anchor, who is the managing editor of News18 India. He is well known for his debate show "Aar Paar". Before News18 India, Devgan was the editor and a news anchor of Zee Media from 2014 to 2015. Previously, he had also served stints at Hindustan Times.

== Controversies and criticism ==
Devgan has been the subject of controversy for sharing misinformation regarding the Muslim community.

=== Kurla Masjid ===
There have been many FIRs against Devgan, one of the complaint was registered on 1 May 2020 over his false claims of Muslims offering of namaz in Kurla masjid, Devgan also showed a fake video claiming the gathering of people near Kurla Masjid.

=== Defamation of Sufi Saint Khwaja Moinuddin Chishti ===
Other complaints were filed against him for defaming Sufi Saint Khwaja Moinuddin Chisti (commonly known as Hazrat Khwaja Ghareeb Nawaz) on 15 June 2020 by saying Lootera (Robber) Chisti, however Devgan after this on 17 June apologized and clarified that he wanted to refer to Khilji (Alauddin Khilji) as a marauder, mentioned the name 'Chisti'. The Supreme Court of India rejected the plea of Devgan to quash all the FIR against him.

=== Fake poster ===
A fake poster of his show also went viral on Twitter claiming Modi was instrumental for death of Baghdadi, after which Devgan responded and clarified that the poster was fake.
