= Syed Vicaruddin =

Indian journalist

- Occupation: Journalist

Syed Vicaruddin (30 April 1942 – 10 December 2021) was an Indian journalist. He was the chief editor of Rahnuma-e-Deccan and also served as Chairman of Indo-Arab League.

== Personal life ==
He was born on 30 April 1942 to Syed Yousufuddin. He died on 10 December 2021. On his date of death, he was tributed by Bandaru Dattatreya, Governor of Haryana and Indian Journalists Union.

== Award ==
- Star of Jerusalem
- Order of Ouissam Alaouite
- Arab League Award
