= Lalit Shastri =

Indian journalist and wildlife filmmaker in Madhya Pradesh

Lalit Shastri is an Indian journalist, Category:The Hindu journalists columnist, wildlife film maker, birder, and environmentalist. He has headed the Madhya Pradesh Bureau of The Hindu and The Asian Age - two of India's leading English newspapers - for more than two decades. He founded and is now Editor-in-Chief of This is News. He quit a corporate job to investigate the causes leading to the 1984 Bhopal gas disaster and subsequently became a full-time journalist. He has extensively covered from ground zero for The Hindu, the riots that followed the demolition of the Babri Mosque in Ayodhya and repeated attacks by Naxalite-Maoists in the Central Indian States of Chhattisgarh and Madhya Pradesh.

In November 2022, Shastri addressed Italian law makers on the theme “Bhopal Disaster and lessons”, to mark 38 years of the Bhopal gas disaster, at the Chamber of Deputies in Rome.

== Education and early career ==
After studying Economics, English Literature and History at the graduation level at Bhopal University, Shastri studied ancient Indian History at the MA level at the centre for Historical Studies at Jawaharlal Nehru University in New Delhi where he played an important role in building the Free Thinkers movement among the freshers of 1978.

== Social service ==
He is also Founder Member of Child Rights Observatory Madhya Pradesh (CROMP), promoted by UNICEF for protection of children's rights. He is also the founder President of Crusade for Revival of Environment and Wildlife (CREW), a not-for-profit organization. CREW works for conservation of environment. The annual Central Indian Highlands Wildlife Film Festival is a focused wildlife and conservation awareness programme being implemented by CREW.

== Authorship ==
Bhopal Disaster—an eyewitness account (1986). It underscores the causes that led to the poisonous gas leak at the Union Carbide pesticide plant in Bhopal during the intervening night of 2 and 3 December 1984. The book titled "Bhopal Disaster—an eyewitness account", was released by the then President Giani Zail Singh at Rashtrapati Bhavan in 1985. This book is a reference volume in the US Library of Congress catalogue.

Political Mirage—50 years after India became Republic (2000). It raises issues concerning civil society and is a collection of articles published in The Hindu over an eight-year period. The book was launched by the then Prime Minister of India Atal Bihari Vajpayee in New Delhi in June 2000.

Bhopal Disaster 38 Years This book by Lalit Shastri, was launched to mark the 38th Anniversary of the 1984 Bhopal gas tragedy caused by the massive leak of the most lethal Methyl isocyanate (MIC) gas from the Union Carbide pesticide plant.

राजनैतिक मृगतृष्णा (Rajnaitik Mrigtrishna), the Hindi version of Lalit Shastri’s book Political Mirage – 50 years after India became Republic, was launched on 1 Jan 2021.

Don of Medical Council of India The book throws light on allegations of massive corruption and irregularities linked with inspections and the overall working of the Medical Council of India

Investigative reports on the status of Tigers titled "Vanishing Stripes" and "vanishing Stripes-II" for Crusade for Revival of Environment and Wildlife (CREW).

Shastri has written research based articles for the Annual Environment Survey published by The Hindu and Frontline.

== Documentary credits ==
“The Tiger – Indicator of Healthy Forest Ecosystem”, a Lalit Shastri film, produced by Madhya Pradesh State Biodiversity Board, has been acclaimed by experts and has been praised for building awareness about wildlife protection and conservation of biodiversity and ecosystems.

Shastri figured as an expert on Environment in the Belgian documentary India for Beginners-2009.

The Last of the Gharial.

Pench—the Mowgli Land on the Pench Tiger Reserve. It was screened at the International Park Conference at Durban in South Africa in September 2003.

Water Birds of Bhopal--It is a 28-minute documentary on water birds. It was screened at India International Centre, New Delhi by Toxics Link.

== Awards and nominations ==
Shasri was nominated by Union Ministry of External Affairs to be part of Media delegation to Malaysia and Brunei Darussalam coinciding with External Affairs Minister's visit to Brunei Darussalam for participating in ASEAN India post-ministerial conference (PMC) and East Asia Summit Foreign Ministers meeting. (24 June – 2 July 2013). In 1998, he was a member of the Confederation of Indian Industry Delegation to London (1998).

Shastri is Member of the Jury for Madhya Pradesh Government's Maharana Pratap Shaurya Rajya Puraskar (Maharana Pratap Bravery Award). He was a member of the Board of Governors of the Nadhya Pradesh Tiger Foundation set up by the Government of the Central Indian State of Madhya Pradesh and also the State Environment Council set up by the Government of Madhya Pradesh for two extended terms (1999–2004). Shastri Was member of the Confederation of Indian Industry Delegation to London (1998).

In 2015 Shastri received the prestigious Outstanding Journalist Award instituted by the Vichitra Kumar Sinha Award Committee in Bhopal, India. In 2006, he was awarded the K.P. Narayanan Award for Excellence in Journalism.

== Citation ==
- Shastri, Lalit "Running a Parallel Government," The Hindu, 26 December 1999
- Access to Justice: Human Rights Abuses Involving Corporations Page 93 Shastri, Lalit, Bhopal Disaster: An Eye Witness Account, Criterion Publications, New Delhi, 1985.
- Neena Vyas and Lalit Shastri - "The BJP's Double Face", The Hindu, 7 May 1995, P 5
- UNITED NATIONS HUMAN RIGHTS COUNCIL, 13th Session of the Working Group on the Universal Periodic Review 21 May to 1 June 2012, International Commission of Jurists (ICJ) submission to the Universal Periodic Review of India, Submitted November 2011 Lalit Shastri, Bhopal Disaster: An Eye Witness Account (New Delhi: Criterion Publications, 1985) pp. 29–30, and 77-78; ]
