= Dainik Sambad =

Indian newspaper

- Type: Daily
- Format: Broadsheet
- Publisher: Bhupendra Chandra Datta Bhowmik Trust
- Founded: 1971
- Political alignment: Center-Left
- Language: Bengali
- City: Agartala, Tripura
- Country: India
- Website: http://www.dainiksambad.net/
- Free online archives: www.dainiksambad.net

Dainik Sambad (Bengali: দৈনিক সংবাদ) is a Bengali daily newspaper published from Agartala, the capital of the Indian state of Tripura. It is one of the largest circulated dailies in the state. It is considered among the better Bengali language news papers of the North East.

In the May 2018 investigative journalism sting by Cobrapost revealed the extent to which the most reputable news papers in India were ready to print communally inciting articles for payments, Dainik Sambad (Gal Shakti) was among the only two publications to refuse to publish it and refused to sell out. This resulted in appreciation for the newspapers ideals in many respected branches of Indian media and people, including "The Wire".
