= India Development and Relief Fund =

Non-profit organization based in North Bethesda, Maryland, US

Coordinates: 39.03787°N 77.118294°W

- Formation: 1988
- Type: Non-profit/ Public charity
- Purpose: To bring sustainable socio-economic development to remote parts of India
- Location: North Bethesda, Maryland
- Region served: India, Nepal and Sri Lanka
- Key people: Vinod Prakash
- Website: www.idrf.org

India Development and Relief Fund (IDRF) is a Maryland, US-based 501(c) (3) tax exempt, non-profit organization (EIN: 52-1555563) that supports impoverished people in India, Nepal and Sri Lanka. IDRF's programs span all over India from Jammu and Kashmir to Tamil Nadu, and from Gujarat to Arunachal Pradesh, Nepal and more recently Sri Lanka. Since its inception in 1988, IDRF has disbursed $34 million in grants to various developmental programs pertaining to areas like: education, health, women's empowerment, eco-friendly development, good governance, and disaster relief/rehabilitation. It reports $1,571,221 in total revenue and total assets of $1,344,798.

== History ==
IDRF was founded in 1988 by Dr. Vinod Prakash, a former World Bank development economist, who has worked as a volunteer for IDRF since he founded it.

IDRF maintains a close collaboration with the Indian American community and helps them realize their dreams of giving back to their “motherland” or" land of their ancestors".

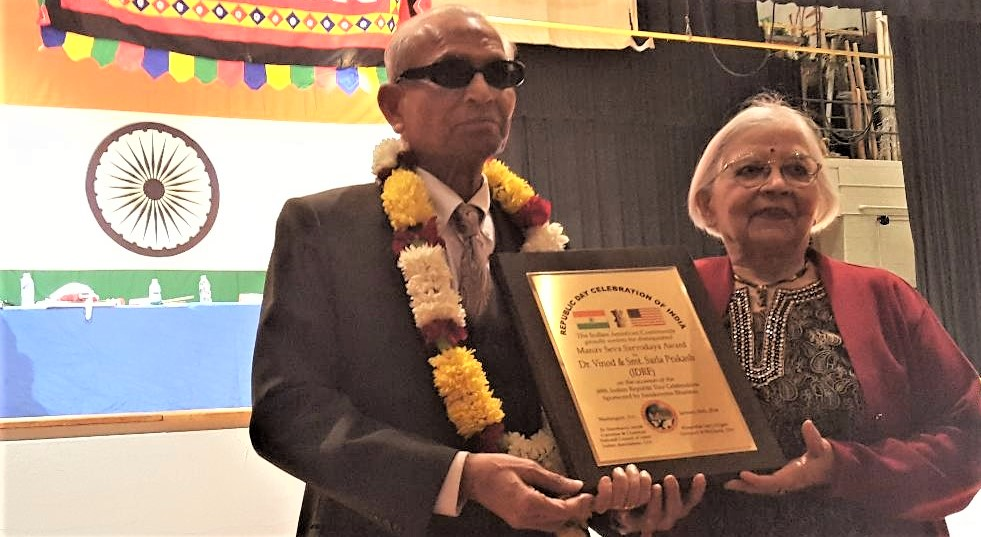
Dr. Vinod and Sarla Prakash conferred with Manav Seva Sarvodaya Award by National Council of Asian Indian Association, Governor Larry Hogan and Indian American Community on 69th Indian Republic Day celebrations in Maryland, January 26, 2018

== Activities ==
Some IDRF accomplishments since 1988:

- Raised $36.25 million and disbursed $33.69 million
- Overheads only 4%, so 96 cents of $1 goes directly to NGOs
- 2,130 Women's Self-Help Groups supported in 333 villages of Haryana, Maharashtra and West Bengal
- 2,500 private toilets constructed for rural poor in Gujarat, West Bengal and Tamil Nadu
- 10,000 students helped in schools and affection homes in nine states across India
- 27,000 students in 400 schools trained to be responsible citizens across 12 cities in India
- 48 Gram Panchayats in 10 districts of Bihar and Jharkhand trained to access government programs and combat corruption
- Supported disaster relief and rehab programs for India Floods, Nepal earthquake, Tsunami, Gujarat earthquake, Odisha Super cyclone, Kargil War and Latur earthquake, etc.

== Programs ==
Education:

- Skill-development program for unemployed rural youth
- Scholarships to meritorious but disadvantaged girls for higher education
- One laptop per poor rural child and E-pustakalaya (online digital library)
- Free education and hostel for underprivileged tribal girls
- Day care for children with special needs

Health: IDRF provides health services to poor people living in remote areas. These services are provided either free or at nominal charges.

- Clean India Mission – Swachha Bharat Abhiyan – Rural Sanitation Units in Gujarat, Telangana, West Bengal, Tamil Nadu and Maharashtra
- 30 mobile clinic vans in various Indian states
- Home for destitute elderly women and children
- Hospitals, pathology Lab-OPD clinic and dispensaries for rural poor
- Free health screenings for diabetes and yoga camps
- Free health camps for the poor, expectant mothers and infants

Women empowerment:

- Free education and scholarships
- Self-Help Groups for economic self-reliance
- Micro-credit to over 5,000 women-led small business enterprises
- Organic farming and sustainable livelihood
- Construction of STEM labs in girls’ schools and colleges
- Vocational training programs

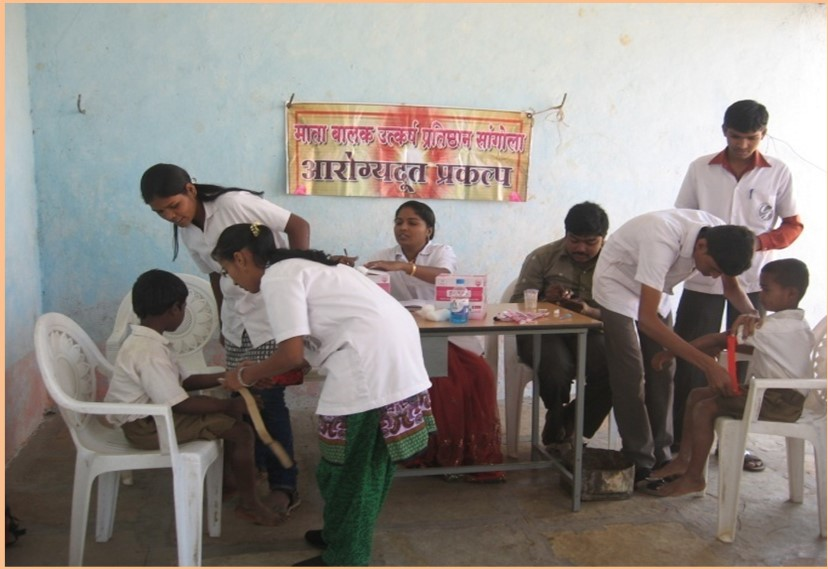
IDRF supports programs that improve/provide: education, healthcare, women empowerment, good-governance, and disaster relief/rehabilitation and eco-friendly livelihoods at grass-roots level.

Eco-friendly development: IDRF funds programs that facilitate rural enterprises by incorporating clean-energy technology and practices and also in conservation of biodiversity and natural resources.

- Safe Drinking Water Harvesting and Security in arid areas
- Organic and efficient farming techniques
- Eco-friendly micro-enterprises by women – organic café, bakery, soap and candle making, food preservation, etc.
- Solar power generation, assembly and distribution of solar-powered lanterns

Disaster relief and rehabilitation:

- Relief-kits have been distributed to hundreds of victims
- Task of resettling the victims by repairing and reconstructing houses
- Providing sustainable development programs in the area to rebuild livelihoods

Good governance

- Increasing women and schedule caste members’ participation in rural local governance
- Reporting bribery cases via mobile apps
- Community policing
- Training of students to be informed and responsible citizens of tomorrow
- Engagement with NITI Aayog (Government of India).

== Controversy ==
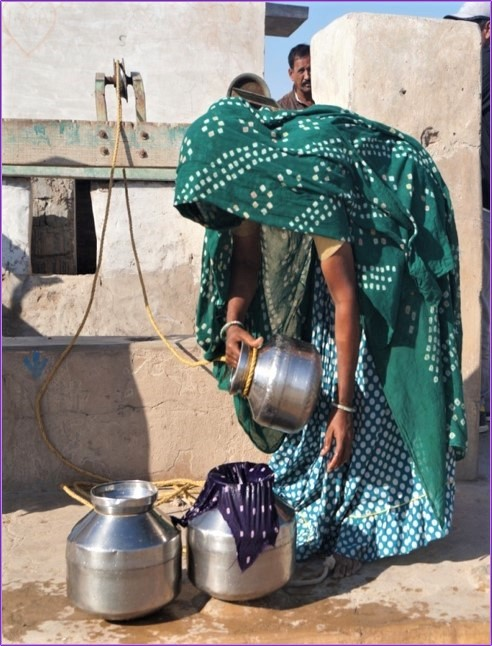

In 2002 a coalition of professionals, students, workers, artists and intellectuals in the US organized "The Campaign to Stop Funding Hate". A report authored by members of this organization focused on IDRF, which it said "has systematically funded Hindutva operations in India ... is not a secular and non-sectarian organization as it claims to be, but is, on the contrary, a major conduit of funds for Hindutva organizations in India. According to the report, IDRF was channeling funds to organizations involved in spreading hate against religious minorities and promoting communal violence.

The report, published by Sabrang Communications and the South Asia Citizens Web, was titled The Foreign Exchange of Hate: IDRF and the American Funding of Hindutva. It investigated how funding raised by IDRF in the US was being distributed in India. It accused that most of the money went to Sangh Parivar organizations.

Sabrang Communications, which prepared this report against IDRF, was itself alleged to have stolen huge sums of money away from victims of the 2002 Gujarat violence and its owner, Teesta Setalvad is being prosecuted for embezzlement of funds on complaints filed with the police by the very "victims" for whom the funds were collected by Teesta Setalvad from donors in US and other countries and her appeal is being heard by the Supreme Court of India.

The report said 70% of money was used for "hinduisation/tribal/education" work, mainly to spreading Hindutva beliefs among tribals. When IDRF filed a tax document in 1989 with the United States Internal Revenue Service, it identified nine organisations as a sample of those it would fund, all of which were associated with the Rashtriya Swayamsevak Sangh (RSS). Some of the groups funded by IDRF had been associated with attacks on Muslims and Christians and with forced conversion of tribals to Hinduism. Angana Chatterji, an anthropology professor helped write the report and said, "We're not saying IDRF is directly involved in communal violence, we're saying that IDRF supports a movement that provokes communal violence". The US State and Justice departments added IDRF to the list of organizations being investigated for illicit donations and money laundering. However, the Office of Management and Budget approved IDRF for the 2012 and 2013 Combined Federal Campaign, the US federal government's workplace giving campaign.

Soon after the report was issued, in November 2002, IDRF dismissed the allegations as "pure concoction, untruthful and self contradicting". In March 2003, in response to the allegations, a team of six Indian-American academics conducted a thorough investigation and concluded that IDRF was not, in fact, supporting violence or furthering any hateful ideology at all. This team, Ramesh Nagaraj Rao, Narayan Komerath, Beloo Mehra, Chitra Raman, Sugrutha Ramaswami, and Nagendra Rao, called themselves "Friends of India," and issued a report called A Factual Response to the Hate Attack on the India Development and Relief Fund (IDRF). Dr. Vinod and Sarla Prakash met the then Indian Home Minister Mr. Lal Krishna Advani and furnished him detailed information about IDRF's grants to various NGOs in India. Few months later, IDRF was informed by his office that there was no evidence of violation of law against it. They published a hard copy of the report, IDRF: Let the Facts Speak in 2003.
