= Communalism Combat =

- Editor: Javed Anand and Teesta Setalvad
- Categories: Human rights
- Frequency: Monthly
- Publisher: Sabrang Communications
- First issue: 1993
- Country: India
- Language: English
- Website: http://www.sabrang.com/
- OCLC: 36621054

Communalism Combat is a monthly magazine published by Sabrang Communications since August 1993. The magazine is edited by husband wife team of Javed Anand and Teesta Setalvad.

== History ==
Javed Anand and Teesta Setalvad left their jobs as Bombay-based journalists in the mainstream press and founded Communalism Combat in 1993 to fight religious intolerance and religious violence in India. Their decision followed the December 1992 demolition of the Babri Masjid in Ayodhya by Hindu fundamentalists. Communalism Combat first appeared in August 1993.

== Funding ==
In a 1999 interview, Javed Anand said that before the 1999 Lok Sabha elections Communalism Combat requested and received funds from the Indian National Congress, Communist Party of India (Marxist) and the Communist Party of India and ten individuals to run advertisements attacking the Sangh Parivar and the Bharatiya Janata Party (BJP). The total budget for this campaign was 15 million rupees, and eighteen ads appeared in 16-18 publications in English, Hindi and other Indian regional languages across India. Some other papers, such as Meerut-e-Samachari and The Asian Age, saw the ads and reprinted them at no cost. One of the ads, attacking the Sangh Parivar's attitude towards women, was endorsed by thirteen NGOs. They received notices from the government pointing out that it was illegal for NGOs that received foreign funding to intervene in politics.

According to Javed Anand, as of 2003 the Air Freight company had supported Communalism Combat for 10 years by buying advertising space in the magazine. The only other advertiser was the Madhya Pradesh government. The Tatas had regularly advertised in the newspaper, but had stopped when the BJP government came into power. The newspaper had been accused of illegally accepting funding from abroad, but this was not substantiated.

== Content and editorial policy ==
The magazine discusses the activities of both minority and majority communal political parties. It also publishes personal accounts from individuals who are involved in the struggle against divisive forces both within and without India. Javed Anand has said, "Communalism Combat is a vehicle through which we try to combat communal conflict. Both minority and majority right-wing." In a 2003 interview by Jyoti Punwani, published in The Hoot magazine, when asked "How do you resolve the age-old debate between objective and activist journalism?" Javed Anand replied,

"There can be nothing like taking an objective stand between secularism and fascism. That’s bull-shit."

He went on to say,

Frankly it’s not our concern to establish our "credibility" as journalists to fascists. When we feel the need, we approach them. We have sent faxes to L. K. Advani and had he replied, we would have published his replies. But we don't want to appear objective just to get Bal Thackeray to talk to us.

== Recognition ==
The Magazine won a Prince Claus Award in 2000. The award citation said "The independent magazine Communalism Combat (founded in 1992, Bombay, India) opposes ethnic fundamentalism and separatism in Indian culture, also in the diaspora. It creates a space for freedom: a platform for the discussion of current and often controversial issues...".

The Milli Gazette described Communalism Combat's special issue on the riots in Gujarat as "Superb". This issue attempted to collect all possible information on the event including official statements and eyewitness accounts. It covered the role of officials and politicians in the riots, the destruction caused and the way in which regional media stirred up anger.
