= Dan Roan =

British journalist

- Born: Daniel Roan; 31 December 1976 (age 49); Northampton, England
- Education: Fitzwilliam College, Cambridge
- Occupation: Journalist
- Title: Sports editor of BBC News (2014–present)

Daniel Roan (born 31 December 1976) is the sports editor for BBC News, currently employed by BBC Sport.

== Biography ==
Daniel Roan was born on 31 December 1976 and was brought up in Northampton, England. Roan went to Wellingborough School. He matriculated at Fitzwilliam College, Cambridge in 1995 to read Social and Political Sciences. He graduated with a second-class degree in 1998.

In 2012, Roan was banned from all media activity involving Manchester City following an interview with Patrick Vieira, which had been originally arranged to promote Football Against Hunger, a charity Vieira was involved with. Vieira was quoted in the interview as stating that city rivals Manchester United receive favourable refereeing decisions when playing at home. Roan was accused of deliberately taking Vieira's comments out of context and engaging in "leading and aggressive questioning".

In 2018, Roan faced calls to resign following his comments at the memorial for Vichai Srivaddhanaprabha and four other victims of a fatal helicopter crash. Roan alleged that the Leicester City's boss had a "mistress who died in the crash". Following, Roan issued an apology to explain that the comments were made off-air and with "no offence intended".

== Personal life ==
In July 2018, Roan was awarded an honorary degree by the University of Northampton. Roan is a native of Northampton.

Media offices
Preceded by Position established	Sports Editor: BBC News; 2014–present	Incumbent
