= Anticipatory bail =

Bail granted under the Criminal Procedure Code of India

Under Indian criminal law, there is a provision for anticipatory bail under Section 482 Bharatiya Nagarik Suraksha Sanhita, 2023 (BNSS) (Corresponding to Section 438(1) of the erstwhile Criminal Procedure Code) . Law Commission of India in its 41st report recommended to incorporate this provision in procedure code. This provision allows a person to seek bail in anticipation of an arrest on accusation of having committed a non-bailable offence.

On filing anticipatory bail, the opposing party is notified about the bail application and the opposition can then contest the bail application in court (public prosecutor can also be used to do this).

Anticipatory bail is a direction to release a person on bail, issued even before the person is arrested. It is only issued by the Sessions Court and High Court.

== Eligibility ==
When any person apprehends that there is a move to get him arrested on false or trumped-up charges, or due or he fears that a false case is likely to be built up against him, he has the right to move the court of Session or the High Court under section Section 482 Bharatiya Nagarik Suraksha Sanhita, 2023 (BNSS) (Corresponding to Section 438(1) of the erstwhile Criminal Procedure Code) for grant of bail in the event of his/her arrest for a non-bailable offence, and the court may if it thinks fit, direct that in the event of such arrest, he shall be released on bail. Anticipatory bail may be applied either to Sessions Court or High Court, it is a bail before arrest.

== Conditions ==
The High Court or the court of session may include such conditions in the light of the facts of the particular case, as it may think fit, including:

- a condition that the person shall make himself available for interrogation by the police officer as and when required;
- a condition that the person shall not, directly or indirectly, make any inducement, threat or promise to any person acquainted with the facts of the case so as to dissuade him from disclosing such facts to the court or to any police officer;
- a condition that the person shall not leave India without the previous permission of the court.

If such person is thereafter arrested, and is prepared either at the time of arrest or at any time while in the custody of such officer to give bail, he shall be released on bail and the magistrate taking cognizance of such offence decides that warrant should be issued against that person, he shall issue a bailable warrant in conformity with the direction of the court granting anticipatory bail. Supreme Court while dealing the case of Sidhram Mhetre, held certain conditions imposed by High Court to be not required & contrary to provisions of anticipatory bail.

== Qualification ==
The applicant must show by disclosing special facts and events that he or she has reason to believe, that he or she may be arrested for a non-bailable offence so that the court may take care to specify the offence or offences in respect of which alone the order will be effective and it is not a blanket order covering all other offences.

== Cancellation ==
An accused is free on bail as long as the same is not cancelled. The High Court or Court of Session may direct that any person who has been released on bail be arrested and commit him to custody on an application moved by the complainant or the prosecution.

== See also ==
- Bail
- Arraignment
- Preliminary hearing
