= George Francis (photographer) =

Indian motorsport photographer and journalist

George Francis (25 October 1961 to 11 April 2019) was an Indian motorsports photographer and journalist. After a few years at the Indian Express, he quit active journalism to focus full time on motorsports and started his own company called Scorp News in October 1984.

== Early life ==
Francis was born in Waynad district of Kerala to KC Francis and Ammini Francis. He did his schooling in CSI St. Paul's Higher Secondary School, Vepery, Chennai.

== Motorsport career ==
Francis was one of the few motorsports photographers who photographed Sholavaram races. He first covered a Sholavaram race in 1984 and soon became a regular photographer at every motorsport event in India. As a freelancer, he contributed photos and articles to all the prominent publications in India including the top newspapers. During a career spanning over three decades he covered every discipline of motorsport including roar racing, rallying, motocross and supercross, karting. Some of the major cross-country rallies he covered included the great Himalayan Rally, London-Sydney Rally, Desert Storm, Dakshin Dare, Indian Grand Prix races, Indian National Rally Championship, MRF Mogrip Supercross Nationals and Indian Racing Championships. MRF Challenge at the Madras Motor Race Track (MMRT) now Madras International Circuit in February 2019 was his last assignment.

After a brief illness, George Francis passed away in Chennai on 11 April 2019. He is survived by his wife Jessie George and son Mario George.
