= Sahar Zaman (journalist) =

Indian journalist

- Born: India
- Occupations: Journalist; art curator; newscaster; television anchor; author; artist
- Years active: 2001–present
- Employer: Independent
- Spouse: Dhiraj Singh (m. 2007)
- Children: 1
- Website: saharzaman.com

Sahar Zaman is an Indian television news journalist and author known for reporting issues concerning citizens' rights and security on her daily prime-time shows. Zaman began her journalism career in 2001 and has since held roles of a news editor and prime-time anchor for various national news channels, including CNN India, TV Today, Times Network, and Bloomberg TV. Her prime-time debates focus on current affairs, national politics, and social issues.

== Journalism career ==
The focus of Sahar Zaman's journalism work has been current affairs and arts. She is best known for her work at Times Network, and has also contributed to CNN India, Bloomberg, Doordarshan, TV Today, OPEN TV, Reuters Asia, Doordarshan News, and Headlines Today in various roles, including writer, news anchor, producer and reporter.

She was invited by Dawn News of Pakistan and Young Asia TV in Sri Lanka to discuss the role of journalism in the Indian subcontinent. She has also discussed her work at TEDx and Lalit Kala Academy.

Zaman regularly contributes as a columnist to prominent publications, including The Times of India, The Sunday Guardian, and National Herald.

== Other activities ==
She is the Founder of Hunar TV a Web TV Channel focused on arts, food, and travel, and the director of Chamak Patti, a functional art brand.

Her debut book is titled Talat Mahmood: The Definitive Biography. Zaman has also been a TEDx Speaker.

== Personal life ==
Zaman is married to artist Dhiraj Singh since 2007. They have a son.
