= Manoj Joshi (commentator) =

Indian Sport journalist, author

Manoj Joshi is an Indian sports journalist, author and TV commentator. He has covered several Olympics, Asian Games, Commonwealth Games, South Asian Games and Afro Asian Games. He is known for his live commentary on 4 seasons of Pro Wrestling League on Sony Network and Big Bout League on Star Sports.

== Career ==
Manoj holds a MA (Hindi) from the Hindu College. He also has a Masters in Mass Communication from Guru Jambheshwar University. He holds a Post-graduate Diploma in Journalism and Mass Communication from the Indira Gandhi National Open University. Manoj started his career with Navbharat Times for 19 years in Mumbai and Delhi between April 1988 to January 2008, and later moved to TV and Digital Media. He has written several articles on newspapers and online prints. He is also a regular contributor to The Daily Guardian & Aaj Samaj. In 2005, he was invited as a guest for sportline programme of ESPN-Star Sports in Singapore. He has 550 hours of live wrestling commentary was recognized by Limca Book of Records in 2021. Manoj has also featured on Amir Khan's movie Dangal. He currently serves as Editor Sports for ITV network group.

He is based in Indirapuram, Ghaziabad.

== Bibliography ==
- Joshi, Manoj (1992). Bhartiya Mall Vidya. Pushpang Prakashan, was awarded by Maharashtra Government & released by Sh. Sharad Pawar at Sangli (Maharashtra) in 1992
- Joshi, Manoj (1992).Indira Gandhi Gold Cup Hockey Tournament by Marine Sports, Mumbai & released by Smt. Sonia Gandhi at National Stadium, New Delhi.
- Joshi, Manoj (2004) Wrestling Rules.
- Joshi, Manoj (2007) Bharat ke Dus Shirshasth Pahelwan
- Joshi, Manoj (2018) Climax (on top 50 bouts of Pro Wrestling League) was released at Ludhiana ISBN 978-93-85995-73-6
