= Teesta Setalvad =

Indian activist and journalist (born 1962)

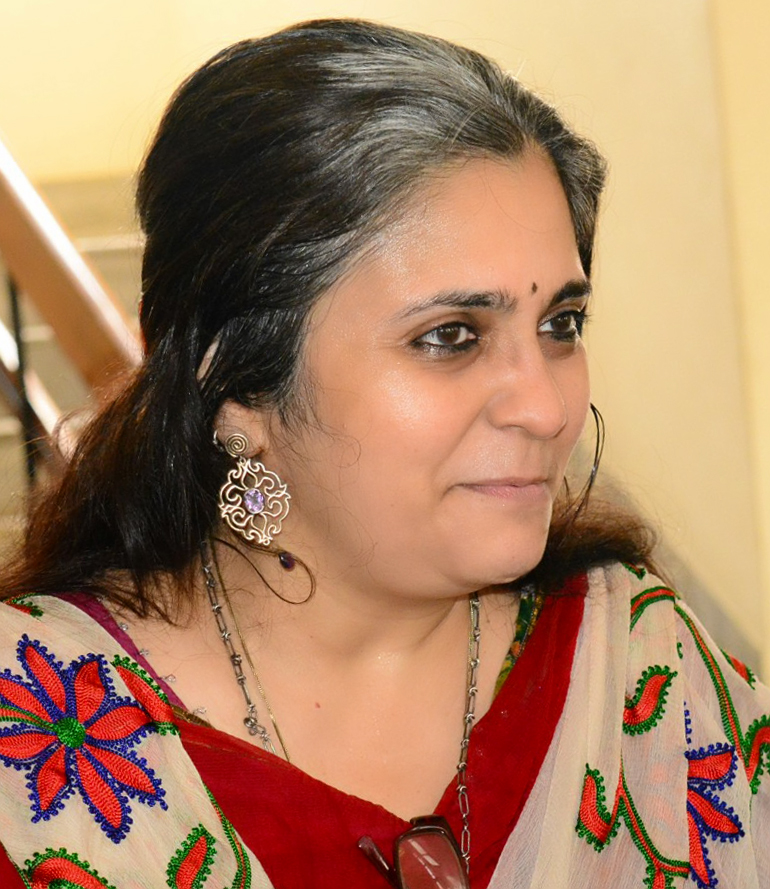
- Setalvad in 2015
- Born: 9 February 1962 (age 64); Bombay (now Mumbai), Maharashtra, India
- Occupations: Civil rights activist and journalist
- Spouse: Javed Anand (m. 1987)
- Children: 2
- Relatives: M. C. Setalvad (paternal grandfather)

Teesta Setalvad (born 9 February 1962) is an Indian civil rights activist and journalist. She is the secretary of Citizens for Justice and Peace (CJP), an organisation formed to advocate for the victims of 2002 Gujarat riots.

== Personal life ==
Born in 1962 into a Gujarati family, Setalvad is the daughter of Atul Setalvad, a Mumbai-based lawyer, and his wife Sita Setalvad. Her paternal grandfather was M. C. Setalvad, India's first Attorney General. Setalvad married Javed Anand, a journalist turned minority rights activist. They have two children, a daughter and a son.

== Career ==
In a public discussion at the Press club in March 2017, Teesta recounted that despite coming from a family steeped in a legal heritage, she decided to pursue a career in journalism after reading a book that her father had bought her called "All the President's men". She subsequently went to college, studied law for two years, dropped out and then graduated with a bachelor's degree in philosophy from Bombay University in 1983 and started work as a journalist. She reported for the Mumbai editions of The Daily (India) and The Indian Express newspapers, and later for Business India magazine. Her first brush with communal violence came when she covered the riots in 1984 in Bhiwandi.

Setalvad's career as a mainstream journalist was a decade long. In 1993, in response to the Hindu-Muslim riots in Mumbai, she and her husband quit their regular jobs to start Communalism Combat, a monthly magazine. According to Javed Anand (Setalvad's husband and co-founder of Communalism Combat), the decision to break from mainstream journalism to start a magazine was because it was also a platform which gave them an opportunity to intervene in ways which they couldn't have otherwise. The last print copy of the magazine was printed in November 2012. Subsequently, they moved to the digital domain by starting a website, which has subsequently been inactive.

Setalvad and her husband, along with others such as Father Cedric Prakash (a catholic priest), Anil Dharker (a journalist), Alyque Padamsee, Javed Akhtar, Vijay Tendulkar and Rahul Bose (all film & theatre personalities) set up an NGO named "Citizens for Justice and Peace (CJP)" on 1 April 2002. The NGO forthwith began to litigate in various courts against the alleged complicity of the Chief Minister and government of Gujarat state in the riots that had broken out shortly before. Their efforts met with partial success in April 2004, when the Supreme Court of India transferred the "Best Bakery case" to the neighbouring state of Maharashtra. At the same time, the court also overturned the recent acquittal of 21 accused and ordered that the investigation and trial be conducted afresh. By 2013, all the cases filed by CPJ had been dismissed at three levels of the judiciary (trial court, state High Court and the Indian Supreme Court) and only one appeal is pending. This is an appeal to the Supreme Court against a conviction handed out by the High Court to Maya Kodnani, a former minister in the government of Gujarat.

Teesta wrote the book A Footsoldier of the Constitution: A Memoir (2017) about her experiences in Gujarat. Her chapter, 'Being Their Target', from this book was reprinted in The Hunger of the Republic: Our Present in Retrospect (2021), part of the India Since the 90s series published by Tulika Books.

She has also authored the chapter When Guardians Betray:The Role of the Police in the book Gujarat:The making of a tragedy, edited by Siddharth Varadarajan and published by Penguin. The book is about the 2002 Gujarat riots.

=== Allegations of witness tampering ===
In November 2004, Setalvad was accused of pressuring Zaheera Sheikh, the key witness in the Best Bakery case, to make certain statements, leading to the unprecedented transferral of the case outside Gujarat. In August 2005, the Supreme Court of India committee absolved her of the charges of inducement levelled against her by Zaheera and awarded a one-year jail sentence to Zaheera for perjury. In 2013 Tehelka in an undercover investigation discovered that Zaheera had been paid to alter her testimony. Tehelka recorded BJP member Madhu Srivastava, described by Tehelka as a "close associate of Narendra Modi" and Batthoo Srivastava describing how they had paid Rs 1.8 million to Zaheera.

Teesta Setalvad's former aide Rais Khan Pathan has filed an affidavit in the Supreme Court alleging manipulation of evidence, which were in the form of statements of witnesses, by her in five sensitive post-Godhra riot cases.

In April 2009, the Times of India ran a story claiming that the Special Investigation Team (SIT) set up by the Supreme Court of India to investigate and expedite the Gujarat riot cases had submitted before the Court that Teesta Setalvad had cooked up cases of violence to spice up the incidents. The SIT which is headed by former CBI director, R K Raghavan has said that false witnesses were tutored to give evidence about imaginary incidents by Teesta Setalvad and other NGOs. The SIT charged her of "cooking up macabre tales of killings".

The court was told that 22 witnesses, who had submitted identical affidavits before various courts relating to riot incidents, were questioned by SIT and it was found that the witnesses had not actually witnessed the incidents and they were tutored and the affidavits were handed over to them by Setalvad. The report which was brought to the notice of the bench consisting of Justices Arijit Pasayat, P Sathasivam and Aftab Alam, noted that the much publicised case of a pregnant Muslim woman Kausar Bano being gangraped by a mob and foetus being removed with sharp weapons, was also fabricated, and false. However, Kausar Bano's husband states alleges the doctors falsified the post-mortem despite his wife's uterus having been removed from her body. The court that was trying the issue found beyond reasonable doubt that Babu Bajarangi killed Kausar Bano and her nine-month-old foetus by stabbing her in the stomach with a sword, but did not find sufficient evidence to prove that he removed the foetus from the uterus.

A day later, the Times of India published a letter from Citizens for Justice and Peace claiming that the report in question was not SIT report but a report by the Gujarat Government. The author of the Times article responded saying "My report was based on the SIT report and not any document circulated by the Gujarat government, as suggested by CJP. Whether any section of the media has the report or not is irrelevant as TOI has access to the report.

R.K. Raghavan, the chairman of the SIT criticised the report leakage, saying, "The alleged reported leaks appear to be inspired by dubious motives. I cannot confirm such claims. The act is highly condemnable". However, he refused to deny or confirm whether the leaked contents were true. The Supreme Court itself condemned the leaking of the SIT report as a 'betrayal of trust' but did not deny the report itself. Raghvan noted that "many incidents were cooked up, false witnesses were tutored to give evidence about imaginary incidents, and false charges levelled against the then Ahmedabad police chief P C Pandey".

=== Allegations of misappropriation of funds ===
In 2013, twelve residents of the Gulbarg Society who were the victim of Gujarat riots, accused Setalvad of collecting donations in the name of riot victims but failing to use them for their benefit and sent a legal notice to her. They claimed that she had collected huge donations from national and international organisations in the name of providing financial assistance for reconstruction of houses or developing the society into a museum but it was not passed to the members of the society. They also sought to ban her organisation "Citizens for Justice and Peace" and prevent them entering the society to organise programmes. The Ahmedabad Crime Branch is conducting an inquiry into the matter.

On 13 March 2013, the official representatives including the secretary and chairman of the Gulbarg Cooperative Housing Society in a letter to the joint commissioner of Police, Crime Branch, Ahmedabad, informed him that the letter-head of the society had been misused by some residents and the claims being made by them were patently false since nothing had been parted from them. A similar letter was also released to the media. In a press release CJP and Sabrang clarified that CJP never sought nor received any money for the museum. Sabrang Trust had raised an amount of Rs 460,285 nationally and internationally from donors for the purpose of the museum and since the plan has been abandoned because of the spiralling real estate prices, the matter is between the trust and the donors which they will address when final decision is taken. All other funds, nationally and internationally raised, have been funds legitimately collected for activities that they publicly engage in. Their accounts are audited and submitted to the relevant authorities. Subsequent to the letter written by the Gulbarg Society members to the police, the police sent them a letter asking for the status quo to be maintained while investigations were in progress. Later, the Crime Branch claimed that the complaint did not have any substance and instead filed an FIR against Setalvad.

After a First Information Report was filed by the Ahmedabad police on 4 January 2014 Teesta Setalvad and Javed Anand were granted interim bail. According to the judge, similar relief has been provided in the past when false allegations were raised. The bail application stated that "The FIR is a mala fide action of the Crime Branch, Ahmedabad, to intimidate a human rights defender. This is the fifth time that a false criminal case has been lodged since 2004 because of me and my organization's consistent legal support to the victims of 2002 riots ... Gulbarga cooperative housing society had been totally burnt down by politically motivated anti-social elements and 68 people had lost their lives in the massacre." It also said the accusation was brought by "powerful forces in Gujarat who wish(ed) to stymie the appeal in the Zakia Jafri case".

On finding that the Crime Branch, Ahmedabad instead of acting on his complaint had filed an FIR against Setalvad and others, the Secretary of the Gulbarg Housing Society, Firoz Gulzar Pathan moved the court complaining against Gujarat police's biased approach. The court sought a report from the Crime Branch. The Police responded by claiming that the complaint did not have any substance. This was countered by the complainant's advocate who maintained that the Crime Branch had not even bothered to question the complainant before shelving the complaint. This led the magisterial court on 15 February 2014 to direct the city crime branch to lodge an FIR and start investigation against former residents of Gulbarg Society who had made the complaint against Setalvad last year. On 28 November 2014, local court rejected pleas filed by activist Teesta Setalvad, her husband Javed Anand and their two NGOs seeking to de-freeze their bank accounts attached earlier by police in connection with the embezzlement case. On 12 February 2015, Gujarat High Court rejected Setalvad's anticipatory bail plea regarding the case. However she was given an interim protection by the Supreme Court of India and on 19 March 2015, a two-judge bench of the Court referred the issue involved in her case to a large three-judge bench.

== Activism ==
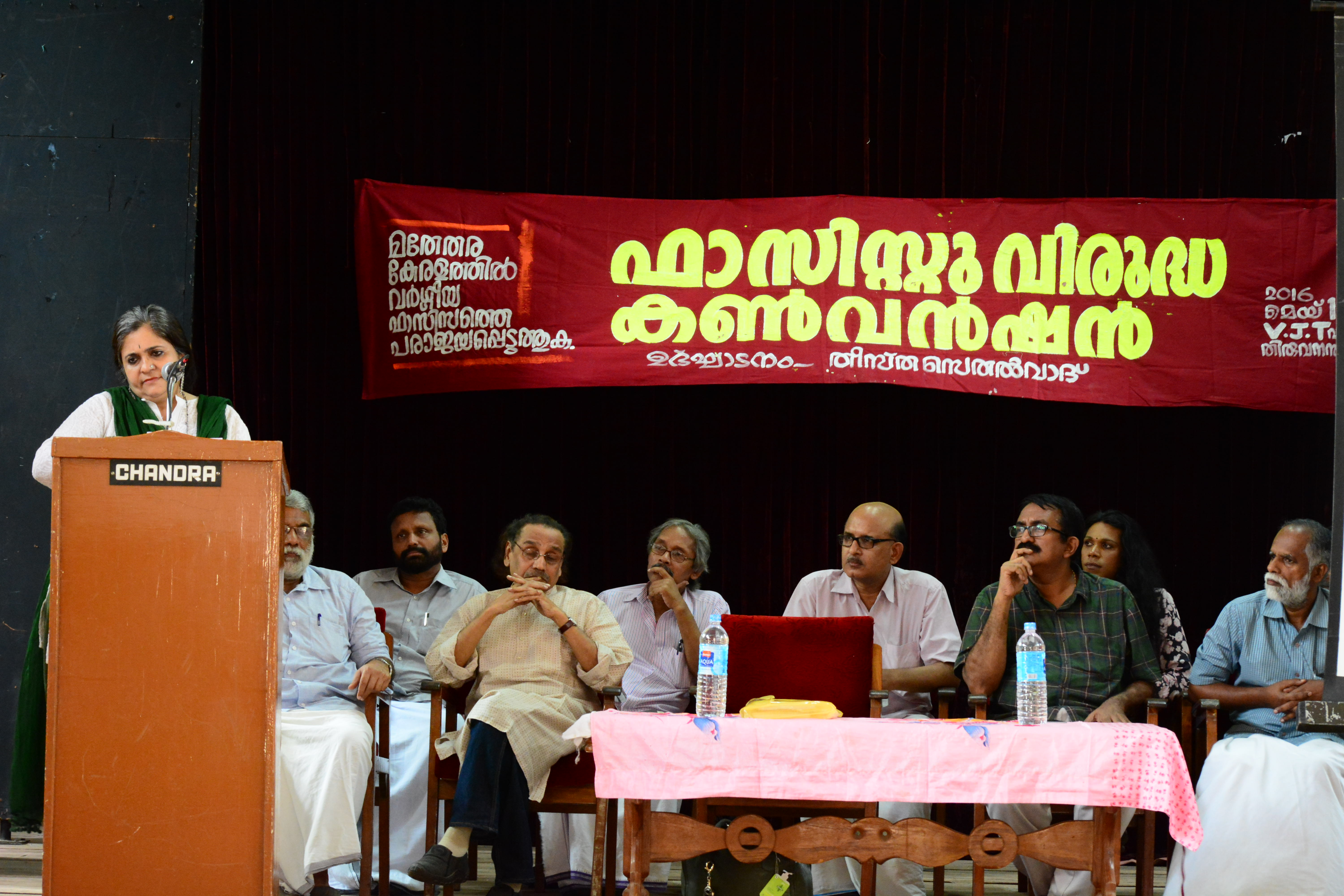
Teesta Setalvad addressing a gathering at VJT Hall Trivandrum, Kerala.

- Teesta, with her husband Javed Anand is the co-founder and co-editor of the magazine Communalism Combat which fosters communal harmony by attacking entities propounding communal violence.
- Teesta testified at the United States Commission on International Religious Freedom on 10 June 2002 against the BJP-led Gujarat government's role in the 2002 Gujarat violence.
- In 1997, Teesta started work on a project, Khoj (Quest), which aims to rewrite sections of Indian school History and Social Studies textbooks to remove "anti-minority prejudices".
- Teesta is a staunch feminist and campaigns for rights and privileges of Dalits, Muslims and women.
- Teesta's husband Javed Anand runs Sabrang Communications which fights for human rights. Teesta is the official spokesperson of this organisation.
- Teesta heads the Mumbai-based NGO Citizens for Justice and Peace (CJP).
- She is one of the founders of the Women in the Media Committee. The group seeks to bring together working women journalists to raise job-related concerns and awareness of gender-sensitivity in writing and reporting on issues concerning women.
- She is one of the founding members of Journalists Against Communalism.
- Apart from the journalistic tasks Teesta Setalvad leads the project "Khoj: Education for A pluralistic India".
- Teesta is General Secretary of People's Union for Human Rights (PUHR).
- Member of the Pakistan India: People's Forum for Peace and Democracy.

== Zakia Jafri-CJP petition ==
Zakia Jafri-CJP Special leave petition seeks a criminal trial of Narendra Modi, the then Chief Minister of Gujarat and the current Prime minister of India and 62 other politicians and government officials for alleged complicity in the Gujarat violence of 2002. The criminal conspiracy complaint alleges that in a meeting of senior police officers and officials convened by the then Chief minister Mr Modi on 27 February 2002 following the Godhra tragedy, he issued his "let Hindus give vent to their anger" directive. In all, there are 30 interrelated and closely interlocked allegations including:

- parading dead bodies of Godhra victims to inflame passions
- police control rooms being staffed by Cabinet ministers
- police investigations being botched
- VHP personnel being appointed as public prosecutors
- promotion of police officers like Mr M.K. Tandon and Mr P.B. Gondia, who faced serious charges of dereliction of duty as a result of which over 200 Muslims were killed in Gulbarg society, Naroda Patiya and Naroda Gaam in Ahmedabad
- penalising upright police officers
- ignoring intelligence warnings
- destruction of carnage-related records

In response to the petition, the Supreme Court on 27 April 2009 ordered the Special Investigation Team (SIT) they appointed to undertake the investigation. The SIT under the Chairmanship of R. K. Raghavan was originally formed to investigate nine major cases of riots in Gujarat in 2002.

The SIT submitted a preliminary report in May 2010. Chairman R. K. Raghavan submitted his comments to the report for perusal of the Supreme Court on 14 May 2010 Further investigation report was filed in November 2010. The Supreme Court in November 2010 appointed Raju Ramachandran as amicus curiae to assist the court in this case. The amicus curiae submitted a note dated 20 January 2011 to the Supreme Court.

On 15 March 2011, the Supreme Court directed SIT to examine the observations of the amicus curiae, to re-examine the entire evidence recorded and if some more evidence is required to be recorded, to do so. It observed that the SIT chairman's inferences did not match with the findings of the SIT probe. Thereafter the SIT examined more witnesses and recorded their statements and submitted a further investigation report on 24 April 2011. On 5 May 2011, during a hearing in the Supreme Court, Shanti Bhushan, the counsel for Zakia Jafri, alleged that SIT was a doing cover-up job and sought copies of the investigation reports. The amicus curiae Raju Ramachandran informed the court that he had received a copy of an affidavit filed by Sanjiv Bhatt that he was present at a 27 February 2002 meeting convened by the chief minister where instructions were given to teach Muslims a lesson. The Supreme Court ordered "The copies of the report, along with the comments of the chairman, be given to the amicus curiae, who shall analyse them in the light of evidence, statements of witnesses, and have his independent assessment of the entire evidence which has come on record". The court further said,"If the amicus curiae, on the basis of evidence on record, finds that any offence is made out against any person, he shall mention the same in the report". The amicus curiae Raju Ramachandran submitted his final report where he found sufficient evidence to make Mr Modi stand trial.

Thereafter, the Court directed the SIT to submit the final report along with the entire material collected by them to the trial court. The SIT was also given access to the reports of the amicus curiae submitted earlier to the court. The SIT did not agree with his conclusion and filed the closure report on 8 February 2012. The trial court on 10 April 2012 observed that SIT had not found any evidence for the prosecution of Modi or any of the top bureaucrats or police officials and had recommended that the investigation be closed.

The court gave the complainant, Zakia Jafri, the option of filing a protest petition However SIT raised various objections to giving all the investigation papers to the petitioner and finally on 7 February 2013, the Supreme Court asked the SIT to hand over copies of all the reports and investigation papers to the petitioners. The protest petition was filed on 15 April 2013.

In April 2013, the SIT while opposing the protest petition filed by Zakia Jafri and CJP against SIT's closure report submitted before a local court that "Teesta Setalvad and others have falsified the complaint targeting the chief minister who had never said that go and kill people." Their lawyer further submitted that the so-called incident of Chief Minister (Narendra Modi) giving instructions (in the meeting) to high-level police officers not to take action against the rioters is a sole creation of Teesta Setalvad. There is no evidence to the same and that Setalvad was not present during the incident.

In their argument that sufficient grounds existed for ordering criminal prosecution of Modi, Zakia Jafri's counsel told the court that SIT which gave Modi a clean chit, itself behaved like a conspirator and glossed over a wealth of official evidence which suggested State complicity in the incidents.

In June 2022, the Supreme Court on rejected plea by Zakia Jafri, and accused Setalvad of exploiting emotions of Jafri.

== Arrest and reactions ==
In June 2022, she was arrested by the Anti Terrorism Squad of Gujarat Police for allegedly conspiring to implicate the Gujarat government functionaries in the 2002 Gujarat Riots. Amnesty International India has said that Setalvad's arrest is a 'direct reprisal' against human rights activists. Protests by citizens were held in Kolkata and Bangalore against her arrest. On 1 September 2022, the Supreme Court said that some details of the case were sketchy. These were: no chargesheet was filed while she was in custody since last 2 months, the registration of FIR was filed the day just after the Supreme Court dismissed Zakia Jafri's case, the Gujarat High court granted a long adjournment, and there are no offences which stop the Gujarat High Court for granting the bail. The next day, Supreme Court granted her interim bail on the ground that she was a woman, leaving the decision of regular bail to the Gujarat High Court after which she was released from jail. The Gujarat High Court later denied her regular bail and directed her to surrender immediately, which was criticized by the Supreme Court as "totally perverse" and "contradictory" while granting her regular bail on 19 July 2023.

=== Allegations of political motivation ===
Though cases against Teesta are still in courts, some journalists have suggested that the case against Teesta is politically motivated, linked to her criticism of Narendra Modi. Some have also disputed the validity of the corruption allegations against her. In a signed article in Outlook magazine, published in March 2015, Indira Jaising wrote that Teesta's organization Citizens for Justice and Peace (CJP) did creditable work in obtaining convictions for 119 people (including a Minister) for participating in the Gujarat riots. Jaising went on to say that:

The case against Teesta smacks of a plan to deter her from assisting victims of the Gujarat 2002 riots. The financial dealings of Teesta and CJP can be probed, but the disproportionality of the legal process, the timing, and the insistence of the prosecution on custodial interrogation, smack of vendetta.

The Gujarat government has rejected the characterization of the case as politically motivated. Solicitor General Tushar Mehta told the Supreme Court that Setalvad should be treated as an ordinary accused whose bail had been rejected, rather than given special consideration. He drew this position from the Gujarat High Court's own findings that she had prima facie exploited communal sentiments for the electoral benefit of a political party that funded her. The Supreme Court subsequently granted her bail. The case remains before the courts with bail conditions, including surrender of her passport, still in effect.

== Recognitions ==
- PUCL Journalism for Human Rights Award 1993.
- Chameli Devi Jain Award for Outstanding Women Mediaperson 1993.
- Maharana Mewar Foundation's Hakim Khan Sur Award (jointly with Javed Anand) in 1999.
- Human Rights Award of the Dalit Liberation Education Trust in 2000.
- The 2002 Rajiv Gandhi National Sadbhavana Award (jointly with Harsh Mander) given by the Congress party annually to people promoting national goodwill.
- The 2003 Nuremberg International Human Rights Award
- 2004 Defender of Democracy award (jointly with Helen Clark), given by Parliamentarians for Global Action
- 2004 M.A. Thomas National Human Rights Award from the Vigil India Movement.
- The 2006 Nani A Palkhivala Award, given by a trust run by the Tata Group.
- Matoshree Bhimabai Ambedkar Award (2007)
- Padma Shri in 2007, awarded for Public Affairs in Maharashtra by the Government of India
- 2009 FIMA Excellence Award – given by Federation of Indian Muslim Associations in Kuwait
- Pax Christi International Peace Award (jointly with Australian artist Eddie Kneebone), given by the Evangelical group "Pax Christi."
- Honorary Doctorate from University of British Columbia (2020)
