= MSG (disambiguation) =

MSG, or monosodium glutamate, is a salt found in food, either naturally or as an additive.

MSG or msg may also refer to:

== Arenas ==
- Madison Square Garden, a sports arena in New York City, United States, the fourth by the name
  - Madison Square Garden (1879), the first arena of the name
  - Madison Square Garden (1890), the second arena of the name
  - Madison Square Garden (1925), the third arena of the name

== Arts, entertainment, and media ==
=== Music ===
- Manchester Sports Guild or MSG, a bygone (1961–1973) jazz and folk venue in Manchester, England
- McAuley Schenker Group, a rock band led by Michael Schenker
  - M.S.G. (McAuley Schenker Group album) (1992)
- Michael Schenker Group, a rock band led by Michael Schenker
  - MSG (Michael Schenker Group album), an album by the Michael Schenker Group
- Nightmare: The Acoustic M.S.G., an EP by the McAuley Schenker Group, released only in Japan
- Notorious MSG, a New York-based hip-hop group

=== Other uses in arts, entertainment, and media ===
- MSG Network, an American regional cable and satellite television network and radio service
  - MSG Sportsnet, its sister channel
- MSG: The Messenger of God, a 2015 Indian action film by Gurmeet Ram Rahim Singh, beginning his MSG film series
  - MSG-2 The Messenger, its sequel released the same year, second in the series
- Mobile Suit Gundam, a 1979 Japanese anime series
- The Message (Bible), an idiomatic translation of the Bible

== Military ==
- HK MSG-90, a sniper rifle made in Germany by Heckler-Koch
- Maine State Guard, active during World War II
- Marine Security Guard, marines posted as guards at U.S. embassies abroad
- Master sergeant, a military rank
- Minnesota State Guard, active during World War II
- Mississippi State Guard, the state defense force of Mississippi
- Missouri State Guard, an American Civil War militia

== Organizations ==
- Melanesian Spearhead Group, an intergovernmental organization composed of four Melanesian states
- Muettersproch-Gsellschaft (Society For the Mother Tongue), society for preservation of Alemannic dialects
- Madison Square Garden Sports (known as MSG Sports), owner of the New York Knicks, New York Rangers, and other sports teams
- Madison Square Garden Entertainment (known as MSG Entertainment), owner of Madison Square Garden and other entertainment properties
- Monaco Sports Group, a Monegasque racing team

== People ==
- M.S.G., former Bloodhound Gang band member (fl. 1994)
- M. S. Gopalakrishnan (1931–2013), Indian violinist
- Gurmeet Ram Rahim Singh (born 1967), Indian spiritual leader convicted of murder and rape, also known as MSG (Messenger of God)

== Science and technology ==
=== Computing ===
- Msg, a command in BITNET Relay
- msg, an e-mail filename extension used by Microsoft Outlook
- MSG.exe, Windows Messenger service's successor in Microsoft Windows Vista for system notification
- MsgPlus!, a Microsoft messenger service

=== Structures in outer space ===
- Meteosat Second Generation, a series of geostationary meteorological satellites
- Microgravity Science Glovebox, on the International Space Station

=== Other uses in science and technology ===
- M-SG reducing agent, an alkali metal absorbed into silica gel
- Mixed sand and gravel, a geological category of beach structure

== Transportation ==
- Maseng railway station (MSG), a railway station in Bogor Regency, Indonesia

== See also ==
- MS4 (disambiguation)
