= List of Hindi films of 2017 =

This is a list of Hindi films that were released in 2017.

== Box office collection ==
The highest-grossing Bollywood films released in 2017, by worldwide box office gross revenue, are as follows.

Rank	Title	Distributor	Worldwide gross	Ref.
1	Secret Superstar	Aamir Khan Productions	₹977 crore (US$154 million)	(Note: Secret Superstar worldwide gross – ₹977 crore (US$154 million): India – ₹90 crore (US$9.3 million); Overseas – ₹885.7 crore (US$92 million); China – US$124.4 million (₹810 crore); Hong Kong – ₹11.5 crore (US$1.2 million); Other territories – ₹65 crore (US$6.7 million))
2	Tiger Zinda Hai	Yash Raj Films	₹570.83 crore (US$87.32 million)	
3	Hindi Medium	T-Series Films	₹334.36 crore (US$51.34 million)	(Note: Hindi Medium: India – ₹96.65 crore (US$10 million); Overseas – ₹235.65 crore (US$24 million); China – US$34.32 million (₹223.46 crore); Other territories – US$2.2 million (₹14.25 crore))
4	Toilet: Ek Prem Katha	Viacom 18 Motion Pictures	₹311.50 crore (US$48.62 million)	
5	Golmaal Again	Reliance Entertainment	₹311.05 crore (US$47.76 million)	
6	Raees	Red Chillies Entertainment	₹308.10 crore (US$47.43 million)	(Note: Raees: Domestic: ₹213 crore (US$22 million); Overseas: $14.1 million (₹95.88 crore))
7	Judwaa 2	Fox Star Studios	₹227.59 crore (US$34.95 million)	
8	Tubelight	Salman Khan Films	₹211.14 crore (US$32.42 million)	
9	Kaabil	Filmkraft Productions	₹208.14 crore (US$31.96 million)	
10	Badrinath Ki Dulhania	Dharma Productions	₹200.45 crore (US$30.78 million)	

Secret Superstar has grossed ₹977 crore worldwide, and is the 4th highest-grossing Indian film of all time. Tiger Zinda Hai has grossed ₹570.83 crore worldwide, and is the 11th highest-grossing Indian film of all time.

== January–March ==
Opening		Title	Director	Cast	Genre	Studio	Ref.
J A N	6	Prakash Electronic	Manoj Sharma	Hemant Pandey, Hrishitaa Bhatt, Vrajesh Hirjee, Manoj Joshi, Sanjay Mishra, Manoj Pahwa	Comedy	Shri Wardhman Movie Ventures, Himalayan Dreams, Prachi Movies India	
J A N	13	Haraamkhor	Shlok Sharma	Nawazuddin Siddiqui, Shweta Tripathi	Comedy, Crime	Sikhya Entertainment, Khusro Films	
J A N	13	Ok Jaanu	Shaad Ali	Aditya Roy Kapur, Shraddha Kapoor	Romance, Drama	Fox Star Studios, Madras Talkies, Dharma Productions	
J A N	20	Coffee with D	Vishal Mishra	Sunil Grover, Anjana Sukhani, Zakir Hussain, Dippanita Sharma	Comedy, Crime	Apex Entertainment	
J A N	25	Kaabil	Sanjay Gupta	Hrithik Roshan, Yami Gautam, Rohit Roy, Ronit Roy	Action, Thriller	Filmkraft Productions Pvt. Ltd	
J A N	25	Raees	Rahul Dholakia	Shah Rukh Khan, Mahira Khan, Nawazuddin Siddiqui, Mohammed Zeeshan Ayyub	Crime, Action	Red Chillies Entertainment, Excel Entertainment	
F E B	10	Hind Ka Napak Ko Jawab: MSG Lion Heart 2	Gurmeet Ram Rahim Singh, Honeypreet Insan	Gurmeet Ram Rahim Singh, Honeypreet Insan	Action, Drama	Hakikat Entertainment Pvt. Ltd.	
F E B	10	Jolly LLB 2	Subhash Kapoor	Akshay Kumar, Huma Qureshi, Saurabh Shukla	Drama	Fox Star Studios	
F E B	10	U, Me Aur Ghar	Abhay Chhabra	Omkar Kapoor; Simran Kaur Mundi	Romance/Drama	Web Talkies	
F E B	10	The Great Leader Kanshiram	Arjun Singh	Raghvendra Singh, Soma Goyal	Biopic	Arjun Singh Films	
F E B	17	Running Shaadi	Amit Roy	Taapsee Pannu, Amit Sadh	Comedy	Crouching Tiger Motion Pictures, Rising Sun Films	
F E B	17	The Ghazi Attack	Sankalp Reddy	Rana Daggubati, Taapsee Pannu, Kay Kay Menon, Atul Kulkarni	Action	Dharma Productions, Matinee Entertainment, PVP Cinema	
F E B	17	Irada	Aparnaa Singh	Naseeruddin Shah, Arshad Warsi, Sharad Kelkar, Divya Dutta	Thriller, Drama	Irada Entertainment	
F E B	17	Chauhar	Raghubeer Singh	Amit Singh Kashyap, Richa Dixit, Vivek Jha	Romance	Dinkar's Film Productions	
F E B	24	Rangoon	Vishal Bhardwaj	Kangana Ranaut, Shahid Kapoor, Saif Ali Khan	War, Drama	Viacom 18 Motion Pictures, Nadiadwala Grandson Entertainment, Vishal Bhardwaj Pictures	
F E B	24	Wedding Anniversary	Shekhar S Jha	Nana Patekar, Mahie Gill, Priyanshu Chatterjee, Shruti Marathe	Romance, Thriller	V K Productions	
F E B	24	Mona Darling	Shashi Sudigala	Anshuman Jha, Divya Menon, Suzanna Mukherjee, Sanjay Suri	Thriller	First Ray Films	
M A R	3	Commando 2	Deven Bhojani	Vidyut Jammwal, Adah Sharma, Esha Gupta	Action	Pen Studios, Sunshine Pictures	
M A R	3	Jeena Isi Ka Naam Hai	Keshhav Panneriy	Arbaaz Khan, Ashutosh Rana, Himansh Kohli	Romance, Drama	Bibia Films Pvt. Ltd.	
M A R	10	Badrinath Ki Dulhania	Shashank Khaitan	Varun Dhawan, Alia Bhatt, Sahil Vaid, Rituraj Singh	Romance, Comedy	Fox Star Studios, Dharma Productions	
M A R	17	Aa Gaya Hero	Dipankar Senapati	Govinda, Ashutosh Rana, Murali Sharma	Action, Comedy	Mangal Tara T.V & Films	
M A R	17	Trapped	Vikramaditya Motwane	Rajkummar Rao, Geetanjali Thapa, Khushboo Upadhyay	Drama, Thriller	Phantom Films	
M A R	17	Mantra	Nicholas Kharkongor	Rajat Kapoor, Lushin Dubey, Kalki Koechlin, Shiv Panditt, Adil Hussain	Drama, Family	Nikhil Chaudhary, Filmart Productions, North East Films, Shri Production, Zenyth Media House	
M A R	17	Machine	Abbas–Mustan	Mustafa Burmawalla, Kiara Advani	Romance, Thriller	Pen India Limited, Aid Films, Abbas-Mustan Productions	
M A R	24	Phillauri	Anshai Lal	Anushka Sharma, Diljit Dosanjh, Suraj Sharma, Mehreen Pirzada	Romance, Comedy	Fox Star Studios, Clean Slate Films	
M A R	24	Bhanwarey	Shaurya Singh	Shaurya Singh, Karan Thakur, Jashan Singh & Priyanka Shukla	Comedy	Sudha Creations	
M A R	24	Anaarkali of Aarah	Avinash Das	Swara Bhaskar	Drama	Promodome Motion Pictures	
M A R	31	Naam Shabana	Shivam Nair	Taapsee Pannu, Prithviraj Sukumaran & Akshay Kumar	Action/thriller	T-Series Films, Cape Of Good Films, Reliance Entertainment, Friday Filmworks	
M A R	31	Poorna: Courage Has No Limit	Rahul Bose	Aditi Inamdar, Rahul Bose & Heeba Shah	Adventure	PVR Pictures, Rahul Bose Productions	

== April–June ==
Opening		Title	Director	Cast	Genre	Studio	Ref.
A P R	7	Laali Ki Shaadi Mein Laaddoo Deewana	Manish Harishankar	Vivaan Shah, Akshara Haasan, Gurmeet Choudhary & Kavita Verma	Romance/drama	Star Entertainment Worldwide	
A P R	7	Mirza Juuliet	Rajesh Ram Singh	Darshan Kumar, Pia Bajpai & Chandan Roy Sanyal	Romance/action	Green Apple Media, Falansha Media Private Limited, Shemaroo Entertainment	
A P R	7	Mukti Bhawan	Shubhashish Bhutiani	Adil Hussain, Lalit Behl & Navnindra Behl	Drama	Red Carpet Moving Pictures	
A P R	14	Saanjh	Ajay Saklani	Aditi Charak, Vishal Parpagga & Rupeshwari Sharma	Drama	Silent Hills Studio	
A P R	14	Begum Jaan	Srijit Mukherji	Vidya Balan, Ila Arun, Gauahar Khan, Sumit Nijhawan & Chunky Pandey	Period drama	Vishesh Films, Shree Venkatesh Films, Play Entertainments	
A P R	14	Romeo-N-Bullet	Aditya Kumar	Vije Bhatia, Rishi Verma, Mohit Baisla, Raj Kumar	Romance	Jay Shree Ram Productions	
A P R	21	Noor	Sunhil Sippy	Sonakshi Sinha, Purab Kohli & Manish Chaudhary	Comedy/drama	T-Series Films, Abundantia Entertainment	
A P R	21	Ek Thi Rani Aisi Bhi	Gulbahar Singh	Hema Malini, Vinod Khanna, Sachin Khedekar	Biopic	Rajmata Vijayaraje Scindia Smirit Trust	
A P R	21	Maatr	Ashtar Sayed	Raveena Tandon	Thriller/drama	CDB Musical Production	
A P R	21	Ajab Singh Ki Gajab Kahani	Rishi Prakash Mishra	Yashpal Sharma, Ajay Kumar Singh, Rajesh Jais	Thriller/drama	Shree Triveni Films International, Basmati Creations	
M A Y	5	Mantostaan	Rahat Kazmi	Raghubir Yadav, Virendra Saxena & Sonal Sehgal	Anthology/drama	Rahat Kazmi Films, Tariq Kan Productions, Aaditya Pratap Singh Entertainments	
M A Y	12	Meri Pyaari Bindu	Akshay Roy	Ayushmann Khurrana & Parineeti Chopra	Romance	Yash Raj Films	
M A Y	12	Sarkar 3	Ram Gopal Varma	Amitabh Bachchan, Jackie Shroff, Amit Sadh & Yami Gautam	Political crime thriller	Eros International, Wave Cinemas, Raju Chadha Films, Alumbra Entertainment, A Company Product, Amitabh Bachchan Corporation	
M A Y	19	Half Girlfriend	Mohit Suri	Arjun Kapoor & Shraddha Kapoor	Romance/drama	Balaji Motion Pictures, Chetan Bhagat Entertainment, ALT Entertainment	
M A Y	19	Jattu Engineer	Gurmeet Ram Rahim Singh, Honeypreet Insan	Gurmeet Ram Rahim Singh, Sukhottam Insan	Comedy	Hakikat Entertainment Pvt. Ltd.	
M A Y	19	Hindi Medium	Saket Chaudhary	Irrfan Khan & Saba Qamar	Comedy/drama	T-Series Films, Maddock Films	
M A Y	26	Chakallaspur	Rajnish Jaiswal	Mukesh Manas, Urmilaa Mahanta	Romance/drama	Kiran Jaiswal Productions	
M A Y	26	Sachin: A Billion Dreams	James Erskine	Sachin Tendulkar	Biopic	200 NotOut Productions	
M A Y	26	Thodi Thodi Si Manmaaniyan	Aditya Sarpotdar	Arsh Sehrawat, Shrenu Parikh, Shilpa Tulaskar & Mukesh Tiwari	Romance/drama	NH 8 Production, Jumping Tomato & Marketing Pvt Ltd	
J U N	2	A Death in the Gunj	Konkona Sen Sharma	Vikrant Massey, Ranvir Shorey, Kalki Koechlin, Tillotama Shome, Gulshan Devaiah, Tanuja, Om Puri, Jim Sarbh, Arya Mitra Sharma	Crime/drama	PVR Pictures, Studioz IDrream, MacGuffin Pictures	
J U N	2	Hanuman: Da' Damdaar	Ruchi Narain	Salman Khan, Raveena Tandon & Kunal Khemu	Animation	R.A.T Films (IP: Percept Pictures)	
J U N	2	Sweetiee Weds NRI	Hasnain Hyderabadwala	Himansh Kohli, Zoya Afroz & Darshan Jariwala	Romance/comedy	Asmiy Entertainment, Grand Motion Picture	
J U N	2	Dobaara: See Your Evil	Prawaal Raman	Huma Qureshi & Saqib Saleem	Horror	Relativity Media, Intrepid Pictures, B4U Films, Zahhak Films	
J U N	2	Flat 211	Sunil Sanjan	Jayesh Raj & Sonal Singh	Suspense/Mystery	Ajha Global Entertainment	
J U N	2	Dear Maya	Sunaina Bhatnagar	Manisha Koirala	Thriller/drama	Wave Cinemas, Bake My Cake Films	
J U N	9	Raabta	Dinesh Vijan	Sushant Singh Rajput, Kriti Sanon & Jim Sarbh	Romance/thriller	T-Series Films, Maddock Films	
J U N	9	Behen Hogi Teri	Ajay K Pannalal	Rajkummar Rao & Shruti Haasan	Romance/comedy	OddBall Motion Pictures	
J U N	9	Bachche Kachche Sachche	Ravi Sadasiv	Ekta Singh, Ashish Vidyarthi & Mukesh Tiwari	Children/drama		
J U N	9	Love You Family	Sachindra Sharma	Salman Yusuff Khan, Aksha Pardasany & Shakti Kapoor	Drama	Khushi Motion Pictures	
J U N	9	G Kutta Se	Rahul Dahiya	Rajbeer Singh & Neha Chauhan	Drama	SFE International Full Frame Entertainment Pvt. Ltd.	
J U N	16	Bank Chor	Bumpy	Riteish Deshmukh, Vivek Oberoi & Rhea Chakraborty	Comedy/Thriller	Y-Films	
J U N	23	Tubelight	Kabir Khan	Salman Khan, Sohail Khan & Zhu Zhu	Action/drama	Salman Khan Films, Kabir Khan Films	
J U N	30	Ek Haseena Thi Ek Deewana Tha	Suneel Darshan	Shiv Darshan, Natasha Fernandez & Upen Patel	Romance	Shree Krishna International	

== July–September ==
Opening		Title	Director	Cast	Genre	Studio	Ref.
J U L	7	Mom	Ravi Udyawar	Sridevi, Akshaye Khanna, Sajal Ali & Nawazuddin Siddiqui	Thriller/drama	Zee Studios, BSK Network & Entertainment, MAD Films, Naresh Agarwal Films, Third Eye Pictures	
J U L	7	Guest iin London	Ashwni Dhir	Kartik Aaryan, Kriti Kharbanda, Paresh Rawal & Tanvi Azmi	Comedy	Panorama Studios	
J U L	14	Jagga Jasoos	Anurag Basu	Ranbir Kapoor & Katrina Kaif	Comedy/romance	Walt Disney Pictures, UTV Motion Pictures, Picture Shuru Entertainment, Ishana Movies	
J U L	14	Shab	Onir	Raveena Tandon, Sanjay Suri, Ashish Bisht, Arpita Pal, Simon Frenay, Raj Suri, Gaurav Nanda	Drama	WSG Pictures, Anticlock Films	
J U L	21	Lipstick Under My Burkha	Alankrita Shrivastava	Konkona Sen Sharma, Ratna Pathak Shah & Aahana Kumra	Sex/drama	ALT Entertainment, Prakash Jha Productions, Balaji Motion Pictures	
J U L	21	Munna Michael	Sabbir Khan	Tiger Shroff, Nawazuddin Siddiqui & Nidhi Agerwal	Action/romance	Eros International, Next Gen Films	
J U L	28	Raag Desh	Tigmanshu Dhulia	Kunal Kapoor, Amit Sadh & Mohit Marwah	Period drama/action	Rajya Sabha TV	
J U L	28	Indu Sarkar	Madhur Bhandarkar	Anupam Kher, Neil Nitin Mukesh, Kirti Kulhari, Tota Roy Chowdhury, Supriya Vinod, Sheeba Chaddha, Parvin Dabas	Drama	Bhandarkar Entertainment, Mega Bollywood	
J U L	28	Mubarakan	Anees Bazmee	Anil Kapoor, Arjun Kapoor, Ileana D'Cruz, Neha Sharma & Athiya Shetty	Comedy/romance	Sony Pictures Networks Productions, Cine1 Studios, Mark Production	
A U G	4	Gurgaon	Shanker Raman	Akshay Oberoi, Ragini Khanna, Pankaj Tripathi, Aamir Bashir, Shalini Vatsa, Srinivas Sunderrajan	Neo-noir	Hashtag Film Studios, M R Filmworks, JAR Pictures	
A U G	4	Jab Harry Met Sejal	Imtiaz Ali	Shah Rukh Khan, Anushka Sharma, Evelyn Sharma & Chandan Roy Sanyal	Romance	Red Chillies Entertainment, Window Seat Films	
A U G	11	Toilet: Ek Prem Katha	Shree Narayan Singh	Akshay Kumar, Bhumi Pednekar, Divyendu Sharma, Anupam Kher, Sana Khan	Comedy/drama	Viacom 18 Motion Pictures, KriArj Entertainment, Plan C Studios, Cape of Good Films	
A U G	18	Partition: 1947	Gurinder Chadha	Hugh Bonneville, Gillian Anderson, Manish Dayal, Huma Qureshi, Michael Gambon	Drama	IFC Films, Pathé, Reliance Entertainment, BBC Films, Ingenious Media, British Film Institute, Bend It Films	
A U G	18	Bareilly Ki Barfi	Ashwini Iyer Tiwari	Ayushmann Khurrana, Rajkummar Rao, Kriti Sanon	Comedy/romance	Junglee Pictures, BR Studios	
A U G	18	Shreelancer	Sandeep Mohan	Arjun Radhakrishnan, Salmin Sheriff	Drama	Tiranga Pictures, The Great Indian Travelling Cinema	
A U G	25	A Gentleman	Raj and D.K.	Sidharth Malhotra, Jacqueline Fernandez, Darshan Kumar, Suniel Shetty	Action/romance	Fox Star Studios, d2r Films	
A U G	25	Babumoshai Bandookbaaz	Kushan Nandy	Nawazuddin Siddiqui, Bidita Bag, Jatin Goswami, Shraddha Das, Anil George, Bhagwan Tiwari, Jeetu Shivhare, Murali Sharma, Divya Dutta, Sachin Chaubey	Action	Movies By The Mob & KNKSPL	
A U G	25	Yadvi – The Dignified Princess	Jyoti Singh	Chandrachur Singh, Charu Vyas, Rahul Godara, Jyoti Singh, Vibhu Raghave, Namya Saxena, Nikkitasha Marwaha, Reshaa Sabarawal, Mini Pandit, Ashwarya Singh	Drama	RVP Productions	
A U G	25	Qaidi Band	Habib Faisal	Aadar Jain, Anya Singh, Sachin, Prince Parvinder Singh	Musical/drama	Yash Raj Films	
A U G	25	Sniff	Amole Gupte	Khushmeet Gill, Monica Sehgal, Vijay Patkar	Comedy/Adventure	Eros International, Trinity Pictures, Amole Gupte Cinema	
S E P	1	Baadshaho	Milan Luthria	Ajay Devgn, Emraan Hashmi, Vidyut Jammwal, Ileana D'Cruz, Esha Gupta, Sanjay Mishra, Sunny Leone Guest appearance in song, Sharad Kelkar, Ravi Kale	Action/crime Thriller	Mangal Murti Films, Cinekorn Entertainment, T-Series Films, Vertex Motion Pictures	
S E P	1	Shubh Mangal Saavdhan	R. S. Prasanna	Ayushmann Khurrana, Bhumi Pednekar, Brijendra Kala, Shubhankar Tripathi, Anshul Chauhan, Anmol Bajaj	Drama/Comedy	Eros International, Colour Yellow Productions	
S E P	8	Poster Boys	Shreyas Talpade	Sunny Deol, Shreyas Talpade, Bobby Deol, Sonali Kulkarni, Randheer Rai, Dilip Prabhavalkar, Elli AvrRam Special Appearance In A Song, Samiksha Bhatnagar, Bharati Achrekar	Comedy	Sony Pictures Networks Productions, Sunny Sounds, Affluence Movies	
S E P	8	Daddy	Ashim Ahluwalia	Arjun Rampal, Aishwarya Rajesh, Nishikant Kamat, Anand Ingale, Rajesh Shringarpure, Purnanand Wandekar, Anupriya Goenka, Shruti Bapna, Usha Naik, Shrikant Yadav, Deepak Damle, Raj Arjun, Vijay Sanap, Abhimanyu Arun	Crime/drama	Kundalini Entertainment	
S E P	15	Simran	Hansal Mehta	Kangana Ranaut, Sohum Shah, Hiten Kumar, Kishori Shahane, Rupinder Nagra	Drama	T-Series Films, Karma Features, Adarsh Telemedia, Paramhans Creations	
S E P	15	Lucknow Central	Ranjit Tiwari	Farhan Akhtar, Diana Penty, Deepak Dobriyal, Gippy Grewal, Ronit Roy, Inaamulhaq, Rajesh Sharma	Drama	Viacom 18 Motion Pictures, Emmay Entertainment	
S E P	15	Patel Ki Punjabi Shaadi	Sanjay Chhel	Rishi Kapoor, Paresh Rawal, Vir Das, Prem Chopra, Payal Ghosh, Jinal Belani, Divya Seth, Bharati Achrekar, Tiku Talsania	Comedy/drama	Bholenath Movies, Cinekorn Entertainment	
S E P	22	Newton	Amit Masurkar	Rajkummar Rao, Pankaj Tripathi, Anjali Patil, Raghuvir Yadav	Dark comedy	Eros International, Drishyam Films, Colour Yellow Productions	
S E P	22	Bhoomi	Omung Kumar	Sanjay Dutt, Aditi Rao Hydari, Sidhant Gupta	Action/drama	T-Series Films, Legend Studios	
S E P	22	The Final Exit	Dhwanil Mehta	Kunaal Roy Kapur, Archana Shastry, Elena Kazan, Reyhna Malhotra, Scarlett Wilson	Horror	Mars Entertainment	
S E P	22	JD	Shailendra Pandey	Govind Namdev, Aman Verma, Vedita Pratap Singh, Lalit Bisht, Arvind Gaur	Drama/thriller	Shailendra Pandey Films	
S E P	22	Haseena Parkar	Apoorva Lakhia	Shraddha Kapoor, Sharman Joshi, Siddhanth Kapoor, Rajesh Tailang, Satendra Bagasi, Ankur Bhatia	Biographic	Swiss Entertainment	
S E P	29	Judwaa 2	David Dhawan	Varun Dhawan, Jacqueline Fernandez, Vikas Verma, Taapsee Pannu, Anupam Kher, Sachin Khedekar, Upasana Singh, Rajpal Yadav, Pavan Malhotra, Ali Asgar, Vivan Bhatena, Johnny Lever, Rajat Rawail, Salman Khan (cameo)	Action/comedy	Fox Star Studios, Nadiadwala Grandson Entertainment	
S E P	29	ISIS: Enemies of Humanity	Yuvraj Kumar	Yuvraj Kumar, Harish Bhimani, Rasheed Naz, Rahul Dev			

== October–December ==
Opening		Title	Director	Cast	Genre	Studio	Ref.
O C T	6	Tu Hai Mera Sunday	Milind Dhaimade	Barun Sobti & Vishal Malhotra	Romantic comedy	Love & Faith	
O C T	6	Chef	Raja Krishna Menon	Saif Ali Khan, Padmapriya Janakiraman & Dhanish Karthik	Comedy	T-Series Films, Abundantia Entertainment, Bandra West Pictures	
O C T	6	Babuji Ek Ticket Bambai	Arvind Tripathi	Rajpal Yadav, Sudha Chandran, Bharati Sharma, Milind Gunaji	Social drama	Harikripa Films	
O C T	6	Main Terrorist Nahi Hoon	Arjin Uppal	Gulshan Grover, Rahul Dev, Afiq Muiz, Chacha Maembong, Farida Jalal	Action		
O C T	13	Ranchi Diaries	Sattwik Mohanty	Jimmy Sheirgill, Taaha Shah & Himansh Kohli	Drama/thriller	Coconut Motion Pictures	
O C T	19	Secret Superstar	Advait Chandan	Zaira Wasim, Meher Vij & Aamir Khan	Musical drama	Zee Studios, Aamir Khan Productions	
O C T	20	Golmaal Again	Rohit Shetty	Ajay Devgn, Parineeti Chopra, Tabu, Arshad Warsi, Tusshar Kapoor, Shreyas Talpade, Kunal Khemu, Prakash Raj, Rohit KaduDeshmukh and Neil Nitin Mukesh	Comedy	Reliance Entertainment, Mangal Murti Films, Rohit Shetty Picturez	
O C T	27	Jia aur Jia	Howard Rosemeyer	Kalki Koechlin, Richa Chaddha	Road film	Bluefox Motion Pictures Pvt Ltd.	
O C T	27	Rukh	Atanu Mukherjee	Manoj Bajpayee, Smita Tambe, Kumud Mishra, Adarsh Gourav	Drama	Eros International, Drishyam Films	
N O V	3	Ittefaq	Abhay Chopra	Sidharth Malhotra, Sonakshi Sinha & Akshaye Khanna	Thriller	Red Chillies Entertainment, Dharma Productions, B.R Films	
N O V	3	The House Next Door	Milind Rau	Siddharth, Andrea Jeremiah & Atul Kulkarni	Horror	Viacom 18 Motion Pictures, Etaki Entertainment	
N O V	3	Ribbon	Rakhee Sandilya	Kalki Koechlin, Sumeet Vyas, Hitesh Malhan	Drama	Red Cart Films	
N O V	10	Shaadi Mein Zaroor Aana	Ratnaa Sinha	Rajkummar Rao, Kriti Kharbanda	Romance/drama	Vikrant Studios	
N O V	10	Qarib Qarib Singlle	Tanuja Chandra	Irrfan Khan, Parvathy, Brijendra Kala	Romance/comedy	Zee Studios, Jar Pictures	
N O V	10	The Window	VK Choudhary	Amit Kumar Vashisth, Teena Singh & Preeti Sharma	Suspense thriller	Adamant Pictures, Milestone Creations & Era Films	
N O V	17	Aksar 2	Ananth Narayan Mahadevan	Zareen Khan, Gautam Rode, Abhinav Shukla, Mohit Madaan	Thriller	Siddhi Vinayak Creations	
N O V	17	Panchlait	Prem Prakash Modi	Amitosh Nagpal, Anuradha Mukherjee & Yashpal Sharma	Romantic comedy	Funtime Entertainment	
N O V	17	Tumhari Sulu	Suresh Triveni	Vidya Balan & Manav Kaul	Social/Comedy	T-Series Films, Ellipsis Entertainment	
N O V	17	Dil Jo Na Keh Saka	Naresh Lalwani	Himansh Kohli, Priya Banerjee	Romantic drama	Diyas Productions	
N O V	17	A Daughter's Tale Pankh	Premraaj	Nishigandha Wad, Mehul Buch, Sudhir Pandey	Action		
N O V	24	Julie 2	Deepak Shivdasani	Raai Laxmi, Ravi Kishan & Aditya Srivastava	Erotic thriller	Triumph Talkies	
N O V	24	Ajji	Devashish Makhija	Sudhir Pandey, Sushma Deshpande	Drama	Yoodlee Films	
N O V	24	Kadvi Hawa	Nila Madhab Panda	Sanjay Mishra, Ranvir Shorey, Tillotama Shome, Bupesh Singh, Ekta Sawant	Drama/disaster	Drishyam Films	
N O V	28	Saankal	Dedipya Joshii	Tanima Bhattacharya, Chetan Sharma, Harish Hariaudh	Drama	Pisceann Pictures	
D E C	1	Tera Intezaar	Raajeev Waalia	Arbaaz Khan & Sunny Leone	Romantic thriller	Bageshree Films	
D E C	1	Firangi	Rajiv Dhingra	Kapil Sharma, Varun Badola & Edward Sonnenblick	Comedy	K9 Films	
D E C	8	Fukrey Returns	Mrighdeep Singh Lamba	Pulkit Samrat, Priya Anand, Ali Fazal, Varun Sharma	Comedy	Excel Entertainment	
D E C	8	Game Over	Paresh Vinodray Savani	Rajesh Sharma, Yashpal Sharma, Gurleen Chopra	Suspense/thriller	Dream Machine, Koning Entertainment & Dream International	
D E C	8	Sallu Ki Shaadi	Mohammad Israr Ansari	Zeenat Aman, Kiran Kumar, Asrani, Kshayp, Arshin and Sandeep Anand	Comedy drama	Aman Film Production, Angel's Production, Brosis Production House, Worldwide Records	
D E C	15	Monsoon Shootout	Amit Kumar	Nawazuddin Siddiqui, Vijay Varma & Tannishtha Chatterjee	Crime/thriller	Fortissimo Films, Moving Pictures, Yaffle Films, Sikhya Entertainment, AKFPL, Fission Features, Pardesi Films, DAR Motion Pictures, Arte	
D E C	22	Tiger Zinda Hai	Ali Abbas Zafar	Salman Khan & Katrina Kaif	Action/drama	Yash Raj Films	

== See also ==
- List of Bollywood films of 2018
- List of Bollywood films of 2016
