= 2017 Northern India riots =

Riots in north india

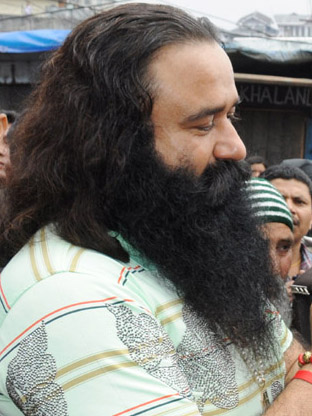
- Gurmeet Ram Rahim Singh
- Date: 25–26 August 2017
- Location: Chandigarh, Haryana, Punjab, Uttar Pradesh, Rajasthan, Delhi and New Delhi
- Caused by: Rape conviction of Gurmeet Ram Rahim Singh
- Methods: Rioting, arson
- Result: Protest halted by the Government

Parties
| Dera Sacha Sauda | Government of India |

Casualties
- Death: >41
- Injuries: >300
- Arrested: 524 (Haryana); 19 (Punjab); 3 (Delhi)
- Detained: ~1,000
- Charged: Honeypreet Insan

On 25 August 2017, widespread rioting in northern India broke out after Gurmeet Ram Rahim Singh, the religious leader of Dera Sacha Sauda (DSS), was convicted of rape. The riots began in Panchkula and later spread to other parts of the northern Indian territories of Chandigarh, Haryana, Punjab, Uttar Pradesh, Delhi and the capital, New Delhi. At least 41 people were killed, the majority of them in Panchkula, where 32 people were allegedly killed by police gunfire. More than 300 others were injured.

== Background ==
Beginning 23 August 2017, parts of Haryana, Punjab and Chandigarh were put under a security lockdown as 200,000 supporters of Ram Rahim amassed in Panchkula ahead of the verdict. A heavy contingent of security was deployed for the verdict including 97 Central Reserve Police Force (CRPF) companies; 16 Rapid Action Force (RAF); 37 Sashastra Seema Bal (SSB); 12 Indo-Tibetan Border Police (ITBP) and 21 Border Security Force (BSF) companies. Another 10 companies were kept on standby.

The authorities had suspended internet services for 48 hours and Section 144 of the Indian penal code (prohibiting an assembly of more than four people) was imposed in Sri Ganganagar, Rajasthan (Ram Rahim's birth-village) in advance of the verdict announcement. Electricity was cut in a few residential areas in Panchkula as a precautionary measure.

On 24 August 2017 Ahead of Verdict Sect Head Gurmeet Ram Rahim Singh Insan appealed to his Followers to maintain Peace. In a Video released Message he Appeal “I have always respected the law. Even though I am having a backache, still abiding by law, I will go to court.I had already asked to maintain peace and had forbidden to go to Panchkula. All Dera followers who have gone to Panchkula please return to their homes. I have to hear the verdict, I will myself go and hear the verdict. We all should respect the law and maintain peace."

On 25 August 2017, around 15:00 (IST), a special Central Bureau of Investigation (CBI) court in Panchkula, Haryana, delivered its verdict in a 2002 sexual assault case of two sadhvis (nuns) of Dera Sacha Sauda. The court found Gurmeet Ram Rahim Singh, the Dera Sacha Sauda chief — known as "the guru of bling" — guilty of rape. The sentence was scheduled to be pronounced on 28 August 2017. He faced a minimum of seven years' imprisonment. Before the verdict, Ram Rahim appealed to his followers to remain calm, after having made the 250 km (156 mi) journey from the sect's headquarters in Sirsa to Panchkula in a 100-vehicle convoy.

Soon afterwards, Ram Rahim's 'Z+ security cover' was withdrawn. He was one of only 36 people in India under that level of government-provided security cover. Ram Rahim was later taken into judicial custody and was reportedly moved to the Western Command Headquarters in Chandimandir Cantonment. Later, he was flown by helicopter to a jail in the nearby town of Rohtak. After the verdict, Ram Rahim supporters were evicted from Panchkula and Chandigarh. Police and paramilitary forces used tear gas shelling in Sector 3, Panchkula, to control Dera supporters which led to clashes.

== Violence ==
Following the conviction, his supporters went on a rampage setting fire to vehicles, government buildings, petrol stations, firetrucks, media vans and railway stations. Ram Rahim's followers took to streets brandishing sticks and throwing rocks upon hearing news of his conviction.

According to an Indian Railways (IR) spokesman, two railway stations were burnt at Malout and Balluana in Punjab and two empty train coaches of Rewa Express were set on fire in Delhi's Anand Vihar station. The arsonists also attempted to set fire to Dagru railway station. PTC News reporters were attacked and a video journalist went missing since the assault. The rioters attacked the NDTV channel's OB Van and injured an engineer. An India Today TV crew was attacked and its cameraman injured in Sirsa. Its OB van was also attacked by rioters in Panchkula. An Income Tax Department's building and two police vehicles were set on fire in Mansa, Punjab. Twenty-eight vehicles were burnt in Panchkula, including some belonging to the government. A telephone exchange was torched by the protesters in Chananwal in Punjab's Barnala district. A sewa kendra was set ablaze near Faridkot. A Vita milk plant and a power substation were damaged in Sirsa.

According to Chief Minister of Punjab Amarinder Singh, 7 people from Punjab died in the clashes. He further stated that in Punjab, 52 minor incidents took place barring the incident when a railway station was burnt. At least 32 people were killed in Panchkula and six others were killed in Sirsa in India's northern Haryana state. More than 300 people were injured in the violence after police and paramilitary forces fired on charged mobs. Police fired tear gas, water cannons and live ammunition while trying to disperse the mobs in Panchkula and near DSS ashram in Sirsa.

By 7:00 pm (local time), the violence subsided in Panchkula. According to Haryana's Director General of Police, some 10,000 followers of Ram Rahim remained holed up in the DSS headquarters, where security forces were kept on "standby".

== Response ==
Curfews were imposed in several areas of Chandigarh city and across the state of Punjab. A number of towns were placed under curfew including; Panchkula, Sirsa, Kaithal, Faridpur and Malout. The border between the states of Haryana and Punjab was sealed. By around 9:55 pm (local time), curfew had been imposed in 8 districts of Punjab namely — Mansa, Bathinda, Firozpur, Faridkot, Fazilka, Patiala, Barnala and Sangrur.

The Indian Army was called in and about 600 soldiers were deployed in the city of Panchkula to help restore order. According to the Indian Army sources, six columns of soldiers were deployed in Panchkula and two columns in Sirsa in Haryana. While, one column of army personnel was deployed in Punjab's Mansa and another column in Muktsar.

Section 144 was imposed in parts of Delhi, and in cities of Shamli, Muzaffarnagar, Baghpat, Noida and Ghaziabad. By around 8:00 pm (local time), Section 144 was also imposed in Sri Ganganagar and Hanumangarh districts of northern Rajasthan. Until 10:00 pm (local time), Section 144 had been imposed in 9 districts of Uttar Pradesh — Meerut, Saharanpur, Shamli, Muzaffarnagar, Ghaziabad, Noida, Bulandshahar, Bagpat and Hapur. It was also imposed in eleven districts of Delhi including in New Delhi till 8 September 2017 and in Uttarakhand's Nainital district.

Following the violence in Panchkula, almost 250 trains to Rohtak Junction were cancelled. Mobile internet and data services remained suspended in Haryana, Punjab and Chandigarh for the next 72 hours. The deputy commissioner in Panchkula requested the district Red Cross Society to send in their trained volunteers. All Delhi Metro stations were kept on alert. The Delhi Petrol Pump Association announced closure of at least 12 fuel stations near the Haryana border in Delhi as a preemptive measure. Delhi Transport Corporation (DTC) suspended its bus services to the National Capital Region (NCR) due to incidents of arson. The Delhi–Lahore Bus service was suspended as well. The Magistrate of Bagpat district directed all schools in the region to remain closed on 26 August.

== Aftermath ==
On 26 August 2017, the Kurukshetra Police sealed the nine Naam Charcha Ghars (congregation centres) of the Dera Sacha Sauda in the Kurukshetra district and recovered 2,500 lathis, rods, long staves, some sharp-edged weapons and 2.5 litres (0.55 imp gal; 0.66 US gal) of kerosene during the search operation.

Three people were arrested in connection with arson in Delhi. According to the Advocate General of Punjab 19 rioters had been arrested including Gurdev Singh, a state-level office bearer of Dera Sacha Sauda. According to a Haryana administrator, more than 500 people had been arrested. According to a Haryana Police (HP) official, more than 1,000 of the guru's supporters had been detained in Panchkula on charges of arson and destruction of public property. After the rioting spread, a court ordered the seizure of the DSS ashram and other properties in compensation for the widespread destruction of public and private property.

According to Haryana's Chief Secretary, D. S. Dhesi, Haryana Police registered two sedition cases when "one AK-47, one Mauser, five pistols and two rifles" were recovered from two vehicles that were part of the convoy accompanying Ram Rahim. According to the Haryana Advocate General, twenty-four vehicles were seized and ten petrol bombs were also recovered. A special hearing was held in the Punjab and Haryana High Court for monitoring the law and order situation in the region and other related issues following the riots.

According to Secretary Dhesi, all the 36 people killed on 25 August were Dera Sacha Sauda followers, who were killed by police gunfire and stampedes. Some lawyers objected to use of lethal bullets by police and filed a petition to request use of pellets to disperse the protesting mobs. But the High Court bench rejected the plea because mobs armed with petrol bombs and other weapons had created a war-like situation.

Police seized firearms from the DSS including a semi-automatic shotgun, one Mauser C96 carbine, some M1 Garand rifles, an M1 Carbine, various pistols, revolvers and some modified guns. A DSS owned Tata Motors fire truck which was escorting the convoy was impounded by the Haryana Police. The police suggested that the fire truck was carrying petrol. Narcotics were also seized from the convoy. 29 vehicles, mostly luxury SUVs, were also impounded from the Dera convoy by Panchkula Police.

A Special Investigation Team (SIT) was formed on August 27, 2017 to investigate the petrol in the fire truck's compartments. The team Haryana Police Commissioner A. S. Chawla confirmed that no flammable material was found in the fire truck by the crime unit and fire department.

Police recovered 85 cartons of explosives that were used to make fireworks during a raid on an illegal fireworks factory owned by the DSS.

There has not been a single conviction in 14 of the 152 cases of rioting that have been decided so far.

The post mortem done on the deceased had confirmed that they all had bullet injuries. These people were shot either in the head, in the chest or in the back. On 6 September 2017 National Human Rights Commission of India (NHRC) directed the Director General of Police (Haryana), the commissioner of police and the Deputy Commissioner of Police (Panchkula) to take appropriate action but NHRC closed the case in 2021 because the case was before the Punjab and Haryana High Court. Followers of DSS had filed a petition in the Punjab and Haryana high court in March 2018 in which they had claimed that actual death toll was much higher. However, the Ministry of Home Affairs (MHA) on 29 March 2022 submitted data on complaints of police firing taken up by the NHRC in the year 2017 but made no mention of the deaths in Panchkula.

== Reaction ==
The President of India, Ram Nath Kovind tweeted, "Violence and damage to public property after court verdict is highly condemnable; appeal to all citizens to maintain peace". Prime Minister of India, Narendra Modi condemned the violence and urged "everyone to maintain peace". While reviewing the situation with the National Security Advisor and the Home Secretary, he asked officials to "work round the clock to restore normalcy and provide all possible assistance that is required".

Chief Minister of Haryana, Manohar Lal Khattar admitted that there were lapses but asserted appropriate action was being taken. According to Chief Minister of Punjab Amarinder Singh, the fault in this mayhem lay with allowing people to gather, adding that "this sort of reaction was anticipated".

The following month after the riots, Akhil Bharatiya Akhara Parishad (ABAP), an umbrella organisation of 13 recognised Hindu akharas (monastic orders), denounced Ram Rahim Singh as a fake baba.

== See also ==
- List of massacres in India
