= MSG-2 The Messenger =

MSG-2: The Messenger
- Theatrical release poster
- Directed by: Gurmeet Ram Rahim Singh; Jeetu Arora
- Written by: Gurmeet Ram Rahim Singh
- Starring: Gurmeet Ram Rahim Singh; Arpit Ranka; Honeypreet Insan; CharanPreet; Shan-E-Meet; Rooh-E-Meet; Rohit Khurana; Kaynat Toor; Sukhwinder Singh; Aman Walia
- Cinematography: Arvind Kumar
- Edited by: Gurmeet Ram Rahim Singh; Sanjay Verma, Kajal Naskar (Creative Director)
- Music by: Abhijit Vaghani
- Production company: Hakikat Entertainment Pvt. Ltd.
- Distributed by: Hakikat Entertainment Pvt. Ltd.
- Release date: 18 September 2015
- Running time: 133 minutes
- Country: India
- Language: Hindi
- Budget: ₹30 crore
- Box office: est.Disputed

MSG-2 The Messenger is a 2015 Indian faith-based action film written by and starring criminal religious leader Gurmeet Ram Rahim Singh, who is also credited as co-director, co-editor, and songwriter. It is a sequel to MSG: The Messenger, released earlier in the same year, with Singh reprising his role as Guruji, a spiritual leader on a quest to save an Adivasi tribe. It was released worldwide on September 18, 2015, followed by the Tamil and Telugu versions on October 1; however, a controversy surrounding the film's allegedly insultive portrayal of Adivasis led to several states banning it.

As for the first installment, the box office gross of the film is disputed, with a large difference between the numbers from box office estimates and the much higher numbers given by the film's producers. Reception was similar to its predecessor, with critics considering it propaganda and a very bad film overall. It was followed by two films, MSG: The Warrior Lion Heart and Hind Ka Napak Ko Jawab: MSG Lion Heart 2, both featuring new and unrelated story and characters; Honeypreet Insan, Singh's daughter who co-stars in MGS-2, directed and starred in both alongside her father.

== Plot ==
The film begins with Guruji rescuing innocent people and performing noble deeds. His devotees offer him sweets to celebrate the government's declaration that the local tribe of primitive people are terrorists. An army is deployed to repel the so-called terrorists, but after some of the army's soldiers are killed by the Ace Archers, the army plans a mission that will remove the primitive people. Guruji dislikes the idea of declaring the primitive people terrorists. According to Guruji, all people are humans, and no inhumane treatment is justified. He believes that even if the local primitive people behave in an uncivilised way, they are not animals, and that every person has the ability to be transformed by love and affection. Even though the primitive people endanger Guruji's life, Guruji decides to advocate for them. A police inspector named Arjun attacks the primitive people, but Guruji saves him after he is badly injured. Arjun goes to meet Guruji with Babru. Guruji also saves the life of the Tibru tribe's leader, Babru's son, and gains his confidence. Babru learns that Guruji has all the signs of Aadi Guru, the deity worshiped by the tribe for many years. Thus, the Tibru tribe becomes civilised by Guruji and abandons their practice of hunting and killing animals for food. Suddenly, the head of the 16 tribes, Ajgar, demands a sacrifice. When Guruji asks the tribe to refuse, he learns that they oppose civilised people and that Ajgar saved them from civilised people. When asked why they hate people who live in cities, Babru states city-dwellers are successors to Eklavya's tribe. As Guru Dakshina, Eklavya was a renowned Archer who gave his thumb, but could not earn respect for his tribe. His forefathers tell him not to worry and say that during Kali Yuga there will be a man who will bring respect to the tribe. On Guruji's insistence, the tribe refuses to offer a sacrifice. On hearing this, Ajgar is enraged and takes the whole tribe as his hostage, but Guruji saves them. Soon Ajgar realizes that Guruji is no ordinary man and that the army might kill him. His own tribe seems to be against him, as the army is about to enter the area to kill the tribe, as they had been labeled as antisocial terrorists. It seems wise to surrender his life to the army rather than risk his entire tribe. He asks for pardon from Guruji for his deeds and runs away, saying that he is going to surrender himself, but when the army takes him as a hostage, Guruji arrives and fights the entire army by himself. Durjan Singh suddenly arrives and tells Guruji how he tried multiple times to prevent the minister from instigating the army into believing that the primitive tribe is its biggest enemy. They were even trying to take Guruji's life but failed miserably because of Guruji. At this point the army realizes that Durjan Singh is misleading them and that Guruji is the man "Saint Gurmeet Ram Rahim Singh Ji Insan" who has been donating blood to the army, eyes to the old parents of army officers, even kidneys to the needy army personnel. They ask Guruji to forgive them, and Durjan Singh once again is defeated by Guruji's noble deeds.

== Cast ==
- Gurmeet Ram Rahim Singh as Guru Ji
- Arpit Ranka as Azgar
- Honeypreet Insan as Parimeet Insan
- Charanpreet Insan as Fairymeet Insan
- Rohit Khurana as Arjun
- Sukhwinder Singh as Durjan Singh
- Rooh-E-Meet as Ajij Khan
- Sahil Insan as DGP
- Shan-E-Meet as Pyardeep Kumar Insan
- Kaynat Toor as Chabuki

== Filming ==
The film was principally filmed in Bhangarh, Rajasthan.

== Marketing ==
A preview poster for the film was released at Shah Satnam Ji Cricket Stadium on 15 August 2015 before an estimated 278,000 attendees celebrating India's Independence Day. A number of world and regional record breaking attempts were organized by sect leader Ram Rahim to promote the film.

== Release and reception ==
=== Bans ===
The film was banned in Madhya Pradesh, Chhattisgarh and Jharkhand for hurting the sentiments of Adivasis, members of India's tribal community. On its first day, the film was banned by the Mansa administration in Punjab but the ban was lifted later. Some movie theatres and multiplexes refused to show movie in Punjab state citing law and order problems.

=== Box office ===
According to The Times of India, MSG-2 collected an estimated Rs 4 crore in its first week The Indian Express noted that on the film's first day in Chandigarh, as few as 35–50 attendees viewed the film at different multiplexes of the city. MSG-2 was released in Punjab a week later, on 25 September, with high attendance, and in some cases "house full" signs outside the screens. 777 Shows screened in a day in Rajasthan Bond's Spectre and PRDP rescheduled to accommodate MSG-2, in Theatres in Punjab 1850 Shows for MSG-2 in Punjab in 48 hours. According to Box Office India, this movie collected 12 crore in its first weekend.

=== Critical response ===
The film received generally negative reviews. NDTV review gave it half a star out of five, describing it as "an obnoxiously crafted propaganda film that lacks finesse." Nandini Ramnath of Scroll.in commented, "even at 133 minutes, there is absolutely nothing in it for people who are not Dera Sacha Sauda devotees." Ramnath continued, "He is on a mission to gain greater influence. Singh has demonstrated that he has the funds and the ability to start a movie franchise. As long as there are newspaper columns that can be bought and cinema seats to be filled, there will be no stopping him" Rohit Vats of Hindustan Times wrote, "Gurmeet Ram Rahim Singh Ji performs a lot of unbelievable stunts in this blatant self promotion." Mohar Basu of Times of India gave MSG-2 one star out of five, describing the film as "merely a vanity project for Pitaji who uses it to exhibit the blingy clothes he designs [and] the gibberish rock songs he composes". Basu explained that the film earned the one star, "for the scene in which Babaji sword-fights in his beautiful Rani-pink frock. Killer and how."

Raja Sen of Rediff, criticized one of the film's plot points, Singh's travels into jungles to liberate Adivasis, India's indigenous tribal population, who are depicted as savages. "Who's to say aboriginal 'Junglee' savages are any less civilised than a hirsute man who leaps off jeeps -- and onto elephants -- while dressed as Lady Gaga on a particularly technicolour day." Sen further described the film as "a laughable product that nevertheless forces us to introspect a bit and ask ourselves who we are".

Deepanjana Pal of Firstpost also criticized the depiction of Adivasis and described the film as "propaganda". Pal noted a musical number in which, "Guruji sings a love song. To himself. As in, he gazes into the eyes of his own mirror image and croons romantic lyrics. Praise be." Pal also wrote about the audience at the Mumbai screening she attended, speculating that they had been brought in from around the country by Singh to populate the theatre. But despite this, Pal wrote, "There were no applauses, no cheers. There may have been a snore or two."

== Soundtrack ==
MSG: 2 The Messenger

Soundtrack album to MSG: 2 The Messenger by: Gurmeet Ram Rahim Singh; Amarpreet
- Released: 10 September 2015
- Genre: Feature film soundtrack
- Length: 24:08
- Label: T Series
- Producer: Gurmeet Ram Rahim Singh

The music of the film is composed by Gurmeet Ram Rahim Singh.

=== Track listing ===
No.	Title	Lyrics	Singer(s)	Length
1	"Party Dhoom Dhaam Se"	Gurmeet Ram Rahim Singh	Gurmeet Ram Rahim Singh	2:30
2	"MSG The Messenger"	Gurmeet Ram Rahim Singh	Gurmeet Ram Rahim Singh	2:18
3	"Rooh Nashiyaani"	Gurmeet Ram Rahim Singh	Gurmeet Ram Rahim Singh, Amarpreet	2:57
4	"Hasin Wadiyon Mein"	Gurmeet Ram Rahim Singh	Gurmeet Ram Rahim Singh	2:58
5	"Sapnon Mein Aana Tera"	Gurmeet Ram Rahim Singh	Gurmeet Ram Rahim Singh	4:41
6	"Hule Maale Gile Chila"	Gurmeet Ram Rahim Singh	Gurmeet Ram Rahim Singh	4:09
7	"Party Dhoom Dhaam Se(remix)"	Gurmeet Ram Rahim Singh	Gurmeet Ram Rahim Singh	4:35

== Sequel ==
The third film in the series titled MSG: The Warrior Lion Heart was released on 7 October 2016.
