= Haryana riots =

Haryana riots' may refer to the following riots in Haryana, India:

- 2017 Northern India riots
- 2023 Haryana riots
