= Network Tera Love Ka =

Album by Gurmeet Ram Rahim Singh

Studio album by Gurmeet Ram Rahim Singh
- Released: April 2012

Network Tera Love Ka is an Indian devotional album released by Dera Sacha Sauda head Gurmeet Ram Rahim Singh in April, 2012. The song lyrics focus on inspiring devotion towards God and are sung in the Rajasthani, Punjabi, Hindi and Haryanvi languages.

== Track listing ==
1. "Kasam Se" (Hindi)
2. "Vanaj" (Punjabi)
3. "Kesariya" (Rajasthani)
4. "Aye Yaara" (Hindi)
5. "Ghent Yaara" (Punjabi)
6. "Jaildara" (Hindi)
7. "Jhanjhar" (Punjabi)
8. "Andy" (Haryanvi)
9. "Network Tere Love Ka" (Hindi)
