= Sri Gurusar Modia =

Sri Gurusar Modia 26 Mod
- Village
- Country: India
- State: Rajasthan
- Tehsil: Suratgarh
- Established: 1955
- Founder: Sardar Maghar Singh
- Named for: M.O.D Canal

Government
  - Type: State Government
  - Body: Government of Rajasthan

Population (2011)
  - Total: 2,348
- Time zone: UTC+5:30 (IST)
- PIN: 335802
- Telephone code: 01509
- ISO 3166 code: RJ-IN
- Vehicle registration: RJ 13

Sri Gurusar Modia is a village in the Indian state of Rajasthan situated near borders of Rajasthan, Haryana and Punjab states and the international border of India and Pakistan. This village is located in the tehsil Suratgarh of district Sri Ganganagar. Suratgarh, once known as Sodhal was believed to be surrounded by the confluence of Saraswati and Drishyati rivers but now the land is a deserted one lying amidst the expanse of The great Indian Thar desert. Suratgarh is famous for its agriculture, air force and army base stations, largest thermal power plant of Rajasthan and largest radio station of Rajasthan called as "Cotton City Channel". Sri Gurusar Modia came into limelight when a controversial self-proclaimed saint and spiritual leader Gurmeet Ram Rahim Singh (who later on convicted for various crimes) was believed to be incarnated there and crowned to the throne of Dera Sacha Sauda at Sirsa in 1990. With setting up of Shah Satnam Schools for both boys and girls, super speciality hospitals etc. this village became nationwide popular

== Religion ==
Most people practice the Hindu and Sikh religions. People worship folk gods such as Ramdevji and Gogaji. Many have faith in Dera Sacha Sauda and they visit their khanghahs (shrines). Some practise Islam. Some follow other practices such as Radha-Soami and Nirankari deras.

== Location and area ==
Sri Gurusar Modia, Teh Suratgarh, Sri Ganganagar District is located between Latitude 28.4 to 30.6 and Longitude 72.2 to 75.3 The total area of Sri Ganganagar is 11,154.66 km^{2} or 1,115,466 hectares. It is surrounded on the east by Hanumangarh District, (Hanumangarh district was carved out of it on 12 July 1994) on the south by Bikaner District, and on the west by Bahawalnagar district of the Pakistani Punjab and on the north by the Punjab.

=== By Air ===
- Nearest airports are Sriganganagar (Lalgarh Jatan) 40 km and Bikaner (Nal) 220 km. Well connected from Jaipur International Airport and Indira Gandhi International Airport Delhi via air route.

=== By Rail ===
Sri Ganganagar is well connected by railways to Delhi 424Kms, Rewari 427Kms, Howrah 1980Kms, Bathinda 127Kms, Haridwar 485Kms, Nanded 1963Kms, Firozpur 184Kms, Suratgarh 40 kms etc. Sri Ganganagar Railway Station is Well connected To Bikaner, Jodhpur, Jaipur, Ahmedabad, Surat, Mumbai and the progress in train services will be affect the population of District headquarters very soon. Yard remodeling and Washing line, sick line and washable apron are main work and a new Electric sub station has been constructed near Aazad cinema fatak. As per September 2018 this track laying work has been completed.

=== By Road ===
National Highway No-15 is running from Sriganganagar to Sanchore, which is well linked with all the major areas of Sriganganagar. Now it's renamed as NH-62 and runs from Sriganganagar to Jaisalmer. Many roadways and private buses are frequently available to major cities of north India like Delhi 431 km, Jaipur 501 km, Ajmer, Udaipur, Chandigarh, Jalandhar, Jodhpur 650 km, Kota, Haryana, Punjab. It is well connected to Mumbai 1472 km by road.

== Climate ==
The climate of Sri Gurusar Modia varies to extreme limits. Summer temperature reaches 53 °C and winter temperature dips just around 0 °C. The average annual rainfall is only 200 mm (7.9 in). Average maximum temperature in summer is 41.2 °C and average minimum temperature in winter is 6 °C. The Canal MOD.(Modia) Flow in the south of village. After this Village it divided in two minors near 32Mod are MOD & DBN (Dhaban). The HDP (Hardyalpura) Minor also Flow into Mod before gurusar modia village.

== Education ==
The village has been a center of learning since its early ages. This city has a large proportion of land which is dedicated to educational institutes. Notable educational institutions from the city include:

=== Schools ===
- Govt. Sen. Sec. School
- Shah Satnam Ji Boys School
- Shah Satnam Ji Girls School
- B.M.B. Public School

=== Colleges ===
- Shah Satnam ji Girls College

== Languages ==
The main languages in the area are Bagri a dialect of Rajasthani, Punjabi and Haryanvi as well. Majority of people in the district speaks Bagri, Rajasthani. Hindi and English are official languages. The Punjabi language, as an optional subject, is taught in schools and colleges of the city. Rajasthani music is very popular in the Sri Ganganagar. The impact of the Saraiki dialect can be observed in Arora, Raisikhs and Saraiki Muslim communities. Now this dialect, Saraiki is losing ground in the northern part of the district. Bagri is spoken only in Ganganagar and Hanumangarh districts and in some tehsils of neighbouring Punjab and Haryana. A number of writers of the district have made contributions to Rajasthani literature, through Bagri.

== Culture ==
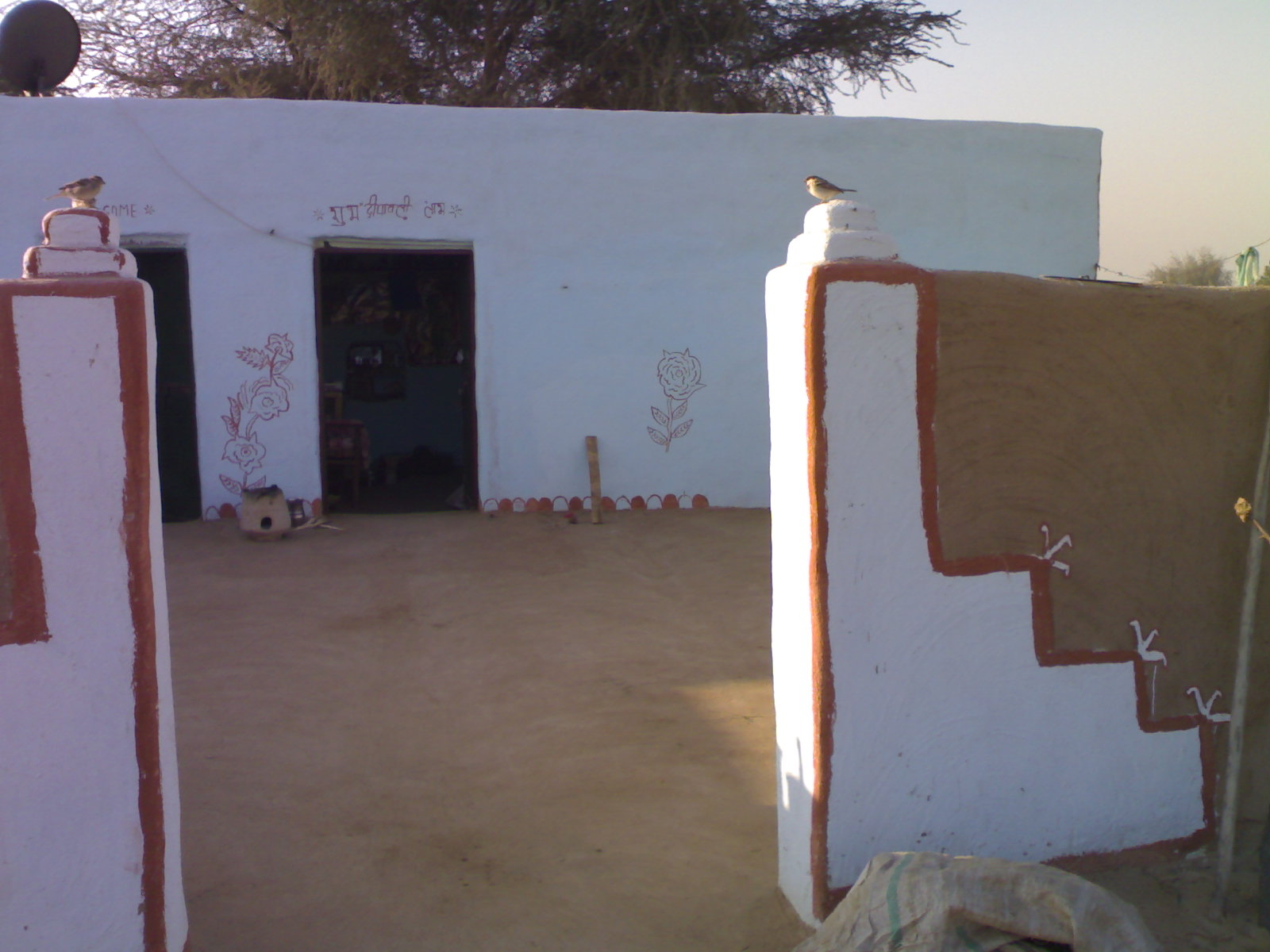
Rural kutcha homes with folk art can be seen in some remote villages, but this art is losing ground.

Punjabi and Bagri cultures dominate the district.

The embroidered Odhni (mostly red in colour) is a symbol of Bagri women. A long shirt and ghaghro (long frock type clothes) and borlo (a head ornament) is the traditional dress of Bagri women.

Punjabi women wear a suit and salwar with chunni (cloth on head). This attire has also become popular with women of other communities. Some women of the Hindu and Muslim Seraiki people still wear ghaggra (long frock).

The Purdah (or veil) is mainly in vogue among Bagri women. Men mainly wear a pant-shirt, kurta-payjama and dhoti (Punjabis call it the chadara-kurta).§

Traditional Sikh and Rajasthani devotional music is popular. Bollywood songs are listened to with same enthusiasm as in other northern Indian regions.
