= Chashma Yaar Ka =

Studio album by Gurmeet Ram Rahim Singh
- Released: August 2012

Chashma Yaar Ka is a music album composed, written and sung by Gurmeet Ram Rahim Singh, the leader of Dera Sacha Sauda, a spiritual organization. The album was released in August 2012. It is Singh's third album. The album is a fusion of modern music and spirituality.

== Track listing ==
1. "Chashma" (Hindi)
2. "Gaya Re Gaya" (Haryanvi)
3. "Tu Mera" (Hindi)
4. "Raatan Baatan" (Punjabi)
5. "Lagan" (Hindi)
6. "Pal" (Hindi)
7. "Allah Re" (Hindi)
8. "Khichaan" (Punjabi)
9. "Mehndi" (Hindi)
