= Highway Love Charger =

Studio album by Gurmeet Ram Rahim Singh
- Released: May 2014
- Recorded: 2006–2014
- Genre: EDM
- Length: 62:27 minutes
- Label: Universal
- Producer: Gurmeet Ram Rahim Singh

Gurmeet Ram Rahim Singh chronology
Lov Rab Se	Highway Love Charger

Highway Love Charger is a musical album by Gurmeet Ram Rahim Singh Ji Insan, the spiritual leader of the Dera Sacha Sauda sect. The album sold three million copies in the first three days after its release. The album's lyrical contents are directed against prostitution, recreational drug use, abortion and various other "evils". The music video for the song, "Love Charger", quickly garnered a large view count on YouTube. The song was also featured on the Tonight Show Starring Jimmy Fallon on the show's segment 'Do Not Play'.

== Track listing ==
1. "Seene Se Lagake" (Hindi)
2. "Tu Chaheye" (Hindi)
3. "Mathiya Gulgulle" (Punjabi)
4. "Dil" (Haryanvi)
5. "Tu Sans" (Hindi)
6. "Love Charger" (English)
7. "Cham Cham" (Rajasthani)
8. "Peep Peep Pe" (Hindi)
9. "Kille De Jor Te" (Punjabi)
10. "Highway" (Hindi)
11. "Anurag Kaourav Baba"
