= MSG: The Messenger =

2015 Indian Hindi film by Gurmeet Ram Rahim Insan

- Theatrical release poster
- Directed by: Gurmeet Ram Rahim Singh; Jeetu Arora
- Written by: Gurmeet Ram Rahim Singh
- Produced by: Ravi Verma (Supervising)
- Starring: Gurmeet Ram Rahim Singh; Daniel Kaleb; Flora Saini; Jayshree Soni; Olexandra Semen; Gaurav Gera; Jay Singh Rajpoot; Raju Pandit
- Cinematography: Gurmeet Ram Rahim Singh; Vineet Sapru; Mangal
- Edited by: Gurmeet Ram Rahim Singh; Sanjay Kumar Singh, Kajal Naskar(Co Director)
- Music by: Amar Mohile
- Production company: Hakikat Entertainment Pvt. Ltd.
- Distributed by: Hakikat Entertainment Pvt. Ltd.
- Release date: 13 February 2015
- Running time: 191 minutes
- Country: India
- Language: Hindi
- Budget: ₹30 crore
- Box office: ₹17.7 crore

MSG: The Messenger (also known as MSG: The Messenger of God) is a 2015 Indian Hindi-language action comedy film written by and starring Gurmeet Ram Rahim Singh in his film debut. He is also credited as co-director, co-cinematographer, co-editor, songwriter and stuntman. The film was released worldwide on 13 February 2015. It follows a spiritual leader, played by Singh and largely based on himself, on a quest to eradicate drugs and gender-related issues.

MSG: The Messenger received largely negative reviews from critics, who accused it of being a propaganda film promoting Singh's teachings, while also severely criticising its quality. It was also controversial for being allegedly insulting towards Sikhs. Box office estimates indicated that the film grossed approximately ₹16.65 crore (US$2.0 million) on a budget of ₹30 crore (US$3.5 million), although the producers claimed ₹126 crore (US$15 million). It was followed the same year by a direct sequel, MSG-2 The Messenger, and later by two more instalments, The Warrior Lion Heart and Hind Ka Napak Ko Jawab, with Singh similarly involved in all of them.

== Synopsis ==
Guru is a spiritual leader with a large following. He has accepted the challenge of eradicating social evils, including drug abuse and gender-related issues, which have long been prevalent in society. Those with vested interests in maintaining the status quo are now disturbed as there is someone who has taken control of the situation. They are conspiring to kill him.

== Cast ==
- Gurmeet Ram Rahim Singh as Guruji
- Daniel Kaleb as Jalebi Bai
- Flora Saini as Muskan
- Jayshree Soni as Kasam
- Olexandra Semen as Alice
- Gaurav Gera as Bhondu
- Jay Singh Rajpoot as Jet Bhai
- Himanshu Tiwari as Tiwari Don
- Raju Pandit as Khurana

== Production ==
The film was shot at various locations in Maharashtra, Karnataka and Kerala. The movie also features 1 million, three hundred-thousand extras. The film was completed in 67 days. The cast had almost no training in film or acting. For the song 'Never Ever' about 125,000 performers continued their shot for three days, and on a count of three, 70 thousand candles were lit within 45 seconds. Singh held a three-day concert at the Shah Satnam Ji Stadium in Sirsa, Haryana, from 16 August, which is part of the movie.

== Certification ==
The film was denied a release certificate by the Central Board of Film Certification and was sent to a revising committee. The members of the CBFC objected to the portrayal of Singh as a God in the movie. On 15 January 2015 the film was cleared for screening by the Film Certification Appellate Tribunal. Singh denied that he had called himself God in the film (at the time the film was titled, MSG: Messenger of God). He further added that there was nothing objectionable in his film and that the CBFC had muted just two words. Punjab and Haryana High Court also allowed the release of the film. The film was fully cleared by the board with a U Certificate and released on 13 February 2015.

== Promotion ==
The trailer of the film was released on 19 December 2014 and crossed over 1 million views on YouTube within 24 hours. On 16 January 2015, MSG: The Messenger premiered at Leisure Valley ground, a large park in Gurgaon city used for exhibitions and conventions. A team from Asia Book and India Book of Records recorded the official number of people gathered as 157,231 for the promotion.

== Reception ==
=== Critical response ===
The film received mostly negative reviews. Criticism focused on the self-aggrandizing nature of the film. Raja Sen, writing for Rediff, refused to rate the movie. "This is not a movie," he said. He described the film as a "propaganda piece" for "self-styled spiritual leader" Singh and stated that the film "might be a theatrical release, but this can, by no means, be called a piece of cinema." The Indian Express described the film as "excruciatingly awful only for non-believers." DNA called the film "three hours of torture so painful that you start laughing at yourself".

Rohit Vats reviewing for Hindustan Times urged readers to "watch it only if your survival depended on it". Bollywood Hungama stated that the film "can be watched once... purely for the dynamics and the histrionics of the endearing Gurmeet Ram Rahim Singh Ji Insan". Times of India rated it one out of five stars, commenting that "the one star is strictly for Babaji's intriguing choice of outfits. A multi-coloured crochet two-piece (tight tees and knee-length pants) takes the cake."

=== Box office ===
The box office gross of the movie has been contested. Bollywood Hungama, Box Office India, and other industry sources reported figures as low as ₹10 crore (US$1.2 million), while sources associated with the film reported results as high as ₹120 crore (US$14 million).

A report by the Business Standard gave tentative opening day figures of ₹2.5 crore (US$300,000), citing the limited appeal to non-believers, distribution to less expensive theatres, and competition from Roy as reasons for the relatively weak opening. The 2015 Cricket World Cup, which kicked off the following day, was also expected to detract from later ticket sales.

=== Protests ===
Various Sikh groups protested the release of the movie and demanded that it be banned on the basis that it was offensive to Sikhs. However, a Dera Sacha Sauda spokesperson responded, "There is nothing against which the protests need to be done."

== Soundtrack ==
MSG: The Messenger

Soundtrack album to MSG The Messenger by: Gurmeet Ram Rahim Singh; Amarpreet Insan
- Released: 7 January 2015
- Genre: Feature film soundtrack
- Length: 32:16
- Label: Sony Music India
- Producer: Gurmeet Ram Rahim Singh

The music was composed by Gurmeet Ram Rahim Singh, and a sequence of the movie takes place as a live concert. The soundtrack album consists of 7 songs, all written and sung by Singh, himself.

=== Track listing ===
| No. | Title | Lyrics | Singer(s) | Length |
|---|---|---|---|---|
| 1 | "Desh" | Gurmeet Ram Rahim Singh | Gurmeet Ram Rahim Singh | 3:35 |
| 2 | "Daru Ko Goli Maro" | Gurmeet Ram Rahim Singh | Gurmeet Ram Rahim Singh | 6:34 |
| 3 | "Papa The Great" | Gurmeet Ram Rahim Singh | Gurmeet Ram Rahim Singh & Amarpreet Insan | 4:50 |
| 4 | "Never Ever" | Gurmeet Ram Rahim Singh | Gurmeet Ram Rahim Singh | 4:48 |
| 5 | "Never Ever" remix | Gurmeet Ram Rahim Singh | Gurmeet Ram Rahim Singh | 3:39 |
| 6 | "Rataan Bataan" | Gurmeet Ram Rahim Singh | Gurmeet Ram Rahim Singh | 4:24 |
| 7 | "Ram Ram" | Gurmeet Ram Rahim Singh | Gurmeet Ram Rahim Singh | 4:27 |

== Sequels ==
Three sequels have followed, the first MSG-2 The Messenger, was released on 18 September 2015. Followed by MSG: The Warrior Lion Heart (2016) and Hind Ka Napak Ko Jawab: MSG Lion Heart 2 (2017).
