= Murder of Ram Chander Chhatrapati =

2002 murder in Sirsa, India

Ram Chander Chhatrapati (died 21 November 2002) was an Indian journalist who was murdered in a targeted drive-by shooting in 2002. Chhatrapati ran a local Hindi-language evening daily Poora Sach (Hindi: पूरा सच "the whole truth") in Sirsa, Haryana. Chhatrapati was the journalist who published the anonymous letter accusing Dera Sacha Sauda leader Gurmeet Ram Rahim Singh of rape, of which he would later be found guilty. On the night of 24 October, two men riding a motorcycle shot Chhatrapati at point-blank range outside his residence. The journalist succumbed to his injuries in hospital four weeks later. Ram Rahim was convicted for his role in the murder on 11 January 2019 and sentenced to life imprisonment by a Special CBI Court on 17 January 2019.

== Investigation into murder ==
Two local carpenters Nirmal Singh and Kuldeep Singh were arrested for the shooting and cited in the First Information Report (FIR) by the local police. The men reportedly worked at the Dera headed by Gurmeet Ram Rahim Singh. Three months after the killing of Chhatrapati, in January 2003, his son, and successor as proprietor of the local newspaper Anshul Chhatrapati petitioned the High Court for a CBI investigation into Gurmeet Ram Rahim Singh, which nine months later was accepted by the High Court in November.

In July 2007 the CBI filed a charge sheet against the Dera Sacha Sauda chief Ram Rahim. The conclusion of evidence presentation was made in November 2014, along with a related case linked to the murder of Ranjit Singh, a former manager at the Dera. The primary accused Nirmal Singh was granted bail January 2017, 14 years after he was arrested. The other man on the motorbike, Kuldeep Singh, had been granted bail shortly after his initial arrest. The review of the murder case reached final arguments in the same CBI special court at Panchkula that found the Dera chief guilty of rape on 25 August 2017.

== See also ==
- Santanu Bhowmik
- Sudip Datta Bhaumik
- List of journalists killed in India
