= Shah Satnam Singh =

Spiritual leader

Shah Satnam Singh (25 January 1919 – 13 December 1991) was the second spiritual leader of the Indian socio-spiritual organization Dera Sacha Sauda (DSS). Upon the death of the movement's leader and founder Mastana Balochistani on 18 April 1960, he took the leadership later in 1963. He was 41 at the time.

Shah Satnam Singh served as leader until 1990. He died on 13 December 1991. Gurmeet Ram Rahim Singh became the third master of DSS on 23 September 1990. When Gurmeet Ram Rahim Singh formed a DSS welfare and disaster relief organisation, it was called "Shah Satnam Green-S Welfare Force" in honour of the departing leader. The organisation reportedly has more than 70,000 doctors, engineers, rescuers, paramedics, and tradesmen.
