= Gurmeet Ram Rahim Singh =

Indian spiritual leader and murderer

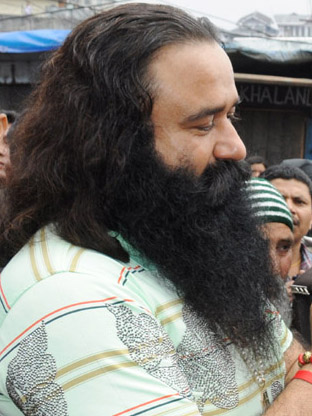
- Born: 15 August 1967 (age 59); Sri Gurusar Modia, Sri Ganganagar, Rajasthan, India
- Occupations: Social group leader; spiritual teacher; actor; filmmaker; singer; songwriter; stuntman
- Years active: 1990–present
- Organization: Dera Sacha Sauda
- Spouse: Harjeet Kaur
- Children: 4
- Status: 20 years in jail
- Conviction: Rape (2 counts)
- Criminal charges: Rape (2 counts); Sacrilege; Castration
- Penalty: Rape: 20 years in jail, 10 years for each of the two rape convictions

Details
- Victims: Rape: unknown; Castration: 400 of his followers
- Country: India
- Website: www.saintdrmsginsan.me

Gurmeet Ram Rahim Singh Insan (born 15 August 1967) is the head of the Indian social group Dera Sacha Sauda (DSS) since 1990 and a convicted rapist.

The Indian Express had placed Ram Rahim 96th in their list of the 100 most powerful Indians of 2015. He has released several music albums and films, which typically revolve around himself and his teachings. Many of these are based on social issues and promotion of God's worship. Singh has also held about a hundred concerts called ‘Ruhani Ru-ba-Ru Nights’. In his films, he is usually credited for various other roles, in one instance being credited in more than forty departments. His films were negatively received by critics, with many considering them propaganda and criticising their poor quality, although the production house claimed that several of them had grossed ₹1 billion.

On 25 August 2017, Ram Rahim was convicted of rape by a special Central Bureau of Investigation (CBI) court. His conviction led to widespread violence by members of the DSS and simultaneous clashes with the police, which left several dead and injured. On 28 August 2017, Ram Rahim was sentenced to 20 years in prison. In January 2019, he and three others were convicted of the murder of journalist Ram Chander Chhatrapati and sentenced to life imprisonment. On 7 March 2026, Punjab and Haryana High Court acquitted Gurmeet Ram Rahim in the 2002 Ram Chander Chhatrapati murder case while reversing the order of the special Central Bureau of Investigation (CBI) court more than seven years after he was convicted and sentenced to life imprisonment. The court also observed that the CBI had coerced a witness, Khatta Singh, into making a statement against him. In October 2021, a special CBI court in Panchkula found Singh and four others guilty of the murder of Ranjit Singh, a former Dera manager. On 28 May 2024 Punjab and Haryana High Court acquitted Gurmeet Ram Rahim and four others in the 2002 Ranjit Singh murder case. The Punjab and Haryana High Court allowed an appeal filed by Dera Chief Gurmeet Ram Rahim and four others against a CBI court order of 2021. He is also facing prosecution for ordering forced castration of 400 followers so that they could get "closer to god".

The name MSG is thought to be derived either from the initials of the three DSS heads, Shah Mastana, Shah Satnam, and Gurmeet Ram Rahim Singh, or as an abbreviation for "Messenger of God".

== Early life and family ==
Singh was born on 15 August 1967 at Sri Gurusar Modia village in Ganganagar district of Rajasthan. Born into a Sikh family, his father Maghar Singh was a landlord, and his mother Naseeb Kaur was a housewife. Maghar was a devoted follower of the DSS leader Shah Satnam Singh, and Gurmeet accompanied his father to the dera. At the age of 7, Singh was initiated into the Dera Sacha Sauda sect by Shah Satnam Singh.

As an adult, Singh did many jobs, including driving a tractor, and assisted his father in volunteer work at the dera. In a surprise public announcement, while announcing his retirement, Shah Satnam Singh appointed him as his successor, giving him the name "Huzoor Maharaj Gurmeet Ram Rahim". Ram Rahim became the leader of Dera at the age of 23, on 23 September 1990.

Ram Rahim and his wife Harjeet Kaur have two daughters, named Amarpreet and Charanpreet. They also have a son, Jasmeet, who is married to Husanmeet, a daughter of the Indian National Congress leader Harminder Singh Jassi. Ram Rahim also adopted his confidante Priyanka Taneja as his daughter, giving her the name Honeypreet in 2009. Ram Rahim's followers have adopted "Insan" ("human") as a surname.

== Controversies ==
=== Rape conviction ===
In 2002, a woman wrote to the respective Chief Ministers of the states of Punjab and Haryana, and to the Union Home Minister, CBI, NHRC and the Punjab and Haryana High Court, describing an incident involving Ram Rahim. The Punjab and Haryana High Court sought a report from the District and Sessions Judge of Sirsa, after which Judge MS Sular conducted an inquiry and submitted a report recommending a probe by a central agency.

After the report from Sirsa, the Punjab and Haryana High Court ordered the CBI to probe into the allegations levelled in the letter. The Chandigarh Branch, CBI registered a case of rape under the IPC Section 376, criminal intimidation under Section 506 and insult to the modesty of a woman under 509. This letter was published in Ram Chander Chhatrapati's four-page Hindi eveninger, Poora Sach in 2002. A CBI probe was ordered into the incident on 24 September 2002. The investigations involved contacting 18 sadhvis who had left the dera by 2002. In the same year, Ram Rahim had charges levied against him for the murder of journalist Ram Chander Chhatrapati, who was writing articles about Dera Sacha Sauda, and for the murder of Dera manager Ranjit Singh. He was later acquitted in these cases by the Punjab and Haryana High Court.

In 2014 Ram Rahim said he was impotent since 1990. The special CBI court rejected these contentions.

On 25 August 2017, a special CBI court in Panchkula, Haryana, delivered its verdict in a sexual assault case regarding a former Dera sadhvi, finding Ram Rahim guilty of two counts of rape. Ram Rahim was taken into custody. More than 200,000 people had gathered near the court premises ahead of the verdict in Panchkula, Haryana. Following the conviction, there were violent protests in parts of India with reports of widespread vandalism. 31–38 DSS members were killed in clashes with police and another 120–300 people were injured as a result. On 26 August 2017, the Punjab and Haryana High Court ordered the police to seize the properties of the group to compensate for the vandalism caused in protests by his supporters. On 28 August 2017, the CBI court sentenced him to a total of 20 years in prison, 10 years for each of the two rape convictions to be served consecutively. Ram Rahim challenged his rape conviction in the Punjab and Haryana High Courts on 9 October 2017.

=== Castration of followers ===
Ram Rahim has been prosecuted for being involved in enforcing the castration of hundreds of followers; Ram Rahim has denied the charges. On 5 October 2018 he was granted bail by a Panchkula CBI court in the case involving castration of 400 of his followers.

=== Conflict with Sikh and Hindu groups ===
In May 2007, Ram Rahim was accused of hurting the religious sentiments of the Sikhs by wearing an advertisement attire resembling the tenth and final living Sikh Guru Gobind Singh, by using a turban with a kalgi (egret feather). His followers also organised a demonstration against their alleged persecution at the hands of some religious organisations. Ram Rahim was attacked by a mob on 16 July 2007, but escaped unhurt. The Dera Sacha Sauda tendered multiple apologies, regretting confusion over the dress, and stated that it had high regard for all Sikh Gurus, Sikh religion and all of humanity. A multi religion delegation approached the apex Sikh organisation to accept the apology. While not rejecting the apology outright, the Akal Takht maintained it was inadequate on several counts.

A criminal case filed against him, for hurting the Sikh sentiments, was dismissed by the Sirsa court in 2009 and Bathinda court in 2014. Counter-terrorism expert Ajai Sahni has stated that the tensions between the Sikh community and the Dera have been exploited by the pro-Khalistan elements. He has further quoted Indian military intelligence that Iknoor Khalsa Fauj, Khalistan Zindabad Force and Khalistan Commando Force have attempted to eliminate him. In a case where the Dera's followers were accused of being suicide attackers, the Dera has stated publicly that it was being targeted by vested political groups that were conspiring to defame it. The organisation has demanded a judicial probe into the allegations.

On 2 February 2008, Ram Rahim's cavalcade was attacked, with explosives injuring 11 persons. A Khalistan Liberation Force member was later arrested and confessed to arranging explosives and executing the plan along with his associates. After that, Ram Rahim was protected with Z+ security cover. On 20 June 2008, a group of Sikhs shouted anti-Dera slogans during Ram Rahim's visit to the Nirmal Lifestyles mall in Mumbai. The situation developed into an altercation between the protestors and the Dera followers, and one of the Sikh protestors was killed. This led to further protests from Sikhs in Mumbai and Punjab. On 27 September 2015, the Akal Takht accepted his apology and pardoned him, but, on observing widespread resentment and protest among Sikhs regarding his pardon, the organisation revoked the pardon on 16 October.

On 8 November 2021 the Punjab Police found concrete evidence for Gurmeet Ram Rahim's involvement in more than 107 cases of Guru Granth Sahib sacrilege cases. He was brought to investigation although no FIR has been issued yet. The Dera Sacha Sauda chief was named as an accused in the theft of 52 "bir's" (copy) of the Guru Granth Sahib, the holy book of Sikhs and burning of a gurdwara and 49 Swaroops along with tearing and misusing 6 of them. The court had, however, said Gurmeet Ram Rahim Singh would not be taken to the Faridkot court in pursuance of a production warrant, according to Hindustan Times the Dera Chief didn't cooperate fully.

The previous SAD-BJP government in Punjab had handed over three cases—lodged in connection with the theft of a copy of the Guru Granth Sahib from a Burj Jawahar Singh Wala gurdwara, putting up of handwritten sacrilegious posters in Bargari and Burj Jawahar Singh Wala, and torn pages of the holy book found at Bargari—to the Central Bureau of Investigation (CBI).

Currently death threats have been issued against him with placards saying "Satkar Committee, Shiromani Gurudwara Parbandhak Committee and Shiromani Budha Dal Fauj please give justice, this evil person (Dusht) has killed the Guru Maharaj, defeat him through the sword (Kirpan) or through the pen (Kalam)."

In January 2016, the Vishwa Hindu Parishad lodged a complaint with police after Ram Rahim dressed up as the Hindu god Vishnu.

In September 2017, the Hindu society Akhil Bharatiya Akhara Parishad, had denounced Ram Rahim Singh as a fake baba.

=== Parole ===
Date	Duration	Notes
24 October 2020	1 day	The jail superintendent granted Ram Rahim one day of parole, to allow him to visit his ailing mother in a hospital in Gurgaon. The administration secretly carried out the work and Ram Rahim was accompanied by police.
21 May 2021	12 hours	On 21 May 2021, Ram Rahim's parole application to visit his unwell mother was approved, which led to his release for 12 hours, "from sunrise to sunset", under police protection.
February 2022	21 days	Ram Rahim was granted 21-day furlough to meet his family. He was given Z plus security.
June 2022	30 days	Ram Rahim was granted a 30-day parole, during which he stayed at his Dera Sacha Sauda Ashram, Barnawa, in Uttar Pradesh's Baghpat. The parole was objected by the SGPC.
14 October 2022	40 days	Ram Rahim was granted a 40-day parole, during which he again stayed in Barnawa, in Uttar Pradesh's Baghpat. During his parole, he released three music videos of tracks wrote, sang, produced and composed by him, titled "Sadi Nit Diwali", "Jaago Duniya De Loko" and "Chat Pe Chat", on his own YouTube channel. Delhi Commission for Women's chairperson Swati Maliwal appealed to cancel the parole.
21 January 2023	40 days	Ram Rahim was given another parole for 40 days to stay at his Dera Sacha Sauda Ashram, Barnawa. The main motive of the parole was to allow Ram Rahim to virtually attend the grand religious fest held at the Dera Headquarters, in Sirsa, on the birth anniversary of the previous dera chief, Shah Satnam Singh. On 23 January 2023 Ram Rahim was seen cutting a giant cake with a sword at Barnala Ashram, Baghpat in a viral video which is an illegal act (Public display of weapons) under the Arms Act, 1959.
20 July 2023	30 days	
20 November 2023	21 days	
19 January 2024	50 days	Ram Rahim was again granted parole, this time for 50 days. He would stay in his Barnawa Ashram in Uttar Pradesh's Baghpat during the period.
2 October 2024	20 days	On 2 October 2024, Ram Rahim again granted 20 days parole ahead of Haryana state assembly elections. This time he again stay in his Barnawa Ashram in Uttar Pradesh's Baghpat during the period. However, the Election Commission had set stringent terms for granting the parole. Among the conditions set was a ban on Ram Rahim's entry in Haryana, delivering public speeches and participating in political activity.
28 January 2025	30 days	On 28 January 2025, with one week remaining until the Delhi Assembly polls, Ram Rahim was once again granted 30 days of parole. For the first time since his conviction, he spent 10 days of his parole at his dera headquarters in Sirsa, Haryana. After that, he moved to his Barnawa Ashram in Baghpat, Uttar Pradesh, for the remaining 20 days of his parole.
9 April 2025	21 days	Ram Rahim was granted a 21-day furlough to stay at his dera headquarters in Sirsa, Haryana.
5 August 2025	40 Days	Ram Rahim was granted a 40-day parole and stayed at the Dera Sacha Sauda headquarters in Sirsa. During this period, he carried out a large-scale tree plantation drive on his birthday and launched flood relief initiatives for affected areas in Punjab.

On 26 February 2024, the Punjab and Haryana High Court ordered the Government of Haryana to not grant parole to Ram Rahim without court orders.

On 13 August 2024 the SGPC strongly objected to the repeated paroles given to Ram Rahim. SGPC President Harjinder Singh Dhami termed it a political agenda of the BJP-led Haryana Government to gain votebank prior to the 2024 Haryana Legislative Assembly election.

On 28 February 2025, Supreme Court of India dismissed a Public Interest Litigation (PIL) challenging the repeated temporary releases of Ram Rahim. Apex court raised concerns about the Shiromani Gurdwara Parbandhak Committee PIL maintainability, pointing out that it was directed at an individual rather than addressing a broader public interest issue.

== Social work ==
His Dera runs 3 hospitals and 10 educational institutes. A CBI report investigating criminal allegations against him mentioned that Ram Rahim's "crusades against drugs, alcohol, and prostitution" have gained him a "larger-than-life" image. He has also spoken out against cattle slaughter in India.

=== Guinness World Records ===
Ram Rahim has organised drives for blood pressure, diabetes and cholesterol screening that have been recognised by Guinness World Records. Ram Rahim also holds six Guinness World Records for organising three largest blood donation camps and three largest tree plantation drives. He also holds the world record for most people sanitising their hands simultaneously also recognised by Guinness World Records. In association with the American Society of Echocardiography, he also organised the world record for "Most Cardiac Echo Tests".

=== Mega cleanliness drives ===
On 21 September 2011 in New Delhi, Ram Rahim initiated a series of mega cleanliness campaigns and sanitation drives and also pledged his support to the Central Government's campaign. As of 2016, about 32 Mega Cleanliness Campaigns have been conducted in several states of India. In early 2023, out on parole, Singh and his sect's volunteers organised two mega cleanliness campaigns across multiple locations in Haryana and Rajasthan.

=== Movement against prostitution ===
In 2009, Ram Rahim had initiated a drive to eradicate forced prostitution from society and rescue them from high risk groups, the women who were pushed into flesh trade were to be brought back into the mainstream of the society and get married them in a good family. He also made arrangement for their treatment from HIV/AIDS and other sexually transmitted infections. Ram Rahim motivated his followers to marry sex workers and out of which 1500 men, agreed to marry women who had left the life of prostitution and wished to get assimilated in the mainstream of society. Many of these marriages have actually taken place.

=== Invitation from the United Nations ===
Almost a month after Singh got convicted, on 4 October 2017, The United Nations Water Body, on their official Twitter handle, had invited Ram Rahim and his "adopted daughter", Honeypreet Insan, to support its World Toilet Day event which was held in November 2017. The rationale behind the United Nations' decision to invite two of India's most controversial figures is still puzzling, as the tweets were later taken down without any clarification.

=== Contribution to sports ===
In 2017, Ram Rahim had been nominated for Dronacharya Award by Yoga Federation of India (YFI) for producing ‘world champion yogis’, including World and Asian Cup winners. Ram Rahim has also established the MSG Bharatiya Khel Gaon, a sports village spread across 23 acres, in his Dera headquarters.

== Political influence ==
Ram Rahim had been known for political clout, as his Dera has a large number of followers among Dalits, estimated to be over 70%. His Dera Sacha Sauda is the only one among the various Deras that openly asks its supporters to vote for particular political parties.

Ram Rahim originally supported the Indian National Congress. and aided them in the 2007 Punjab state elections esp. to wrest control of the Malwa region. Before the 2012 Punjab state elections, the Congress leader Amarinder Singh, his wife Preneet Kaur and his son Raninder Singh visited Ram Rahim, asking him to extend his support to Congress. However, Dera's support to Congress alienated the party's Sikh vote bank. In the 2012 elections, Congress performed poorly, and Jassi himself lost the election. The poor performance of Congress was seen as a signal of the downfall of Dera's political power.

Before the 2014 Haryana state elections, the Bharatiya Janata Party (BJP) leader and Prime Minister Narendra Modi praised Ram Rahim in order to attract the Dera Sacha Sauda followers. Ram Rahim reciprocated by supporting the BJP in the state elections. and in February 2015, again in the Delhi assembly elections. He reportedly claimed to have over 2 million followers in Delhi. His organisation supported BJP in the Bihar assembly election in 2015, and nearly 3,000 Dera followers campaigned for BJP in the state. In 2016, the Haryana sports minister Anil Vij announced a ₹ 5 million grant to the Dera for promoting sports, in Ram Rahim's presence, which led to a controversy.

== Discography ==
=== Albums ===
Year	Title	Lyrics	Composition	Label	Notes
2012	Thank You For That	Yes	Yes	Universal	Commercial debut
2012	Network Tere Love Ka	Yes	Yes	Universal	
2012	Chashma Yaar Ka	Yes	Yes	Universal	
2012	Insan	Yes	Yes	Universal	
2013	Lov Rab Se	Yes	Yes	Universal	
2014	Highway Love Charger	Yes	Yes	Universal	Album sold 3 million copies in the first three days. Music video became an instant hit on YouTube

=== Film soundtracks ===
Year	Title	Songs	Lyrics	Composition	Label	Notes
2015	MSG: The Messenger	"Desh", "Daru Ko Goli Maro", "Papa The Great", "Never Ever", "Never Ever (Remix)", "Rataan Bataan", "Ram Ram"	Yes	Yes	Sony Music India	Ram Rahim was awarded 4 Platinum Plaques from IFPI for music of this movie
2015	MSG-2 The Messenger	"Party Dhoom Dhaam Se", "MSG The Messenger", "Rooh Nashiyaani", "Hasin Wadiyon Mein", "Sapnon Mein Aana Tera", "Hule Maale Gile Chila", "Party Dhoom Dhaam Se (remix)", "MSG The Messenger (remix)"	Yes	Yes	T Series	Some scenes of this movie were shot at Bhangarh Fort, Asia's most haunted place
2016	MSG: The Warrior Lion Heart	"Dhol Baaje", "Sohna Mera Mishri Di Daliye"	Yes	Yes	Zee Music	Second song unveiled in live concert amidst 3.6 million fans
2017	Hind Ka Napak ko Jawab - MSG Lion Heart - 2	"Jung Hai Humri Aatankwad Se", "System Hil Gaya", "Thank U For That", "Tujhe Paa Ke"	Yes	Yes	Zee Music Company	
2017	Jattu Engineer	"Holi Ki Pichkari", "Josh Mein"	Yes	Yes	Hakikat Music	

=== Non-Album Singles ===
Year	Title	Lyrics	Composition	Production	Music	Notes
2016	Tiranga Rumal Chhu League - Anthem Song	Yes	Yes	No	Yes	Anthem for Tiranga Rumal Chhu League organised by MSG All Trading International Pvt. Ltd
2022	Paap Chhupake Punya Dikhake	Yes	Yes	Yes	Yes	
2022	Sadi Nit Diwali	Yes	Yes	Yes	Yes	
2022	Jaago Duniya De Loko	Yes	Yes	Yes	Yes	Punjabi anthem for Ram Rahim's DEPTH campaign for a drug-free society
2022	Chat Pe Chat	Yes	Yes	Yes	Yes	
2023	Mere Desh Ki Jawani	Yes	Yes	Yes	Yes	Patriotic song
2023	Aashirwad Maon Ka	Yes	Yes	Yes	Yes	Haryanvi anthem for Ram Rahim's DEPTH and SAFE campaign for a drug-free society
2024	जय जय सिया राम जय श्री राम, सारी दुनिया है तेरी संतान	Yes	Yes	Yes	Yes	Special Shri Ram Bhajan on occasion of Ram Mandir Pran-Pratishtha at Ayodhya on 22 January 2024.
2025	Karte Hain Ardaas	Yes	Yes	Yes	Yes	This devotional song, released on 27 April 2025, is dedicated to Shah Mastana Ji Maharaj and Shah Satnam Ji Maharaj.

== Filmography ==
=== Films ===
Year	Film	Director	Writer	Role	Notes
2015	MSG: The Messenger	Yes	Yes	Guru Ji	Film debut Co-directed with Jeetu Arora
2015	MSG-2 The Messenger	Yes	Yes	Guru Ji	Sequel to MSG: The Messenger; Co-directed with Jeetu Arora
2016	MSG: The Warrior Lion Heart	Yes	Yes	Lion Heart/SherDil	Spiritual successor to previous MSG films Co-directed with Honeypreet Insan
2017	Hind Ka Napak ko Jawab - MSG Lion Heart - 2	Yes	Yes	Sher-E-Hind	Sequel to MSG: The Warrior Lion Heart; Co-directed with Honeypreet Insan; Based on 2016 Uri attack and 2016 India–Pakistan military confrontation
2017	Jattu Engineer	Yes	Yes	Sghaint Singh Sidhu, Shakti Singh Sisodia	Co-directed with Honeypreet Insan

Online Gurukul was scheduled to be a future project involving Ram Rahim speaking out against terrorism, along with playing in six different roles. On 2 September 2017, the Indian Film & Television Directors’ Association (IFTDA) and the Cine and TV Artists Association (CINTAA) banned Ram Rahim from future work in Indian film and television for "criminality and moral turpitude".
