= ISIS: Enemies of Humanity =

- Directed by: Yuvraj Kumar
- Written by: Yuvraj Kumar
- Produced by: Atlantic Films
- Starring: Yuvraj Kumar, Harish Bhimani, Manon Faure, Rasheed Naz, Rahul Dev
- Cinematography: Aakash Raj
- Edited by: Yuvraj Kumar
- Music by: Kshitij Zode
- Release date: September 29, 2017
- Country: India
- Language: Hindi

ISIS: Enemies of Humanity is a Hindi film based on terrorism. The backdrop of the film speaks volumes about the functioning of ISIS which is a terrorist group playing havoc across the globe. The film outlines the importance of Islam in its purest form & defies the Islam which is projected by anti-social elements of the world.

== Cast ==
- Yuvraj Kumar
- Harish Bhimani
- Manon Faure
- Rasheed Naz
- Rahul Dev
