= MS4 =

MS4, or similar, may refer to:

- 2002 MS_{4}, the provisional designation of trans-Neptunian object 307261 Máni
- MS4 Modeling Environment, a software package
- Metal Slug 4, a video game
- Mississippi Highway 4
- Mississippi's 4th congressional district
- Municipal Separate Storm Sewer System (MS4) required pursuant to United States law to regulate stormwater runoff
