= Mastana Balochistani =

Indian guru

- Title: Founder

Personal life
- Born: Khemamal Kotra, Kalat, Balochistan, British India
- Parents: Pilamal; Tulsa Bai

Religious life
- Religion: Sant Mat

Senior posting
- Based in: Sirsa, India
- Period in office: 1948-1960
- Successor: Shah Satnam Singh Gurbax Singh Manager

Mastana Balochistani, honorifically known as Shah Mastana Balochistani Ji, was an Indian saint in Radha Soami Sant Mat spiritual tradition and the founder of Dera Sacha Sauda (DSS) in Sirsa (modern Haryana). He was originally from Balochistan, and later moved to Sirsa.

== Life ==
Mastana Balochistani was born as Khemamal to Pila Mal Ji and Tulsa Bai Ji, in Kalat district in Balochistan, British India. Later, Baba Sawan Singh honoured him with the name of Shah 'Mastana Balochistani'. Singh further declared him "Mastana-e-Mastanon, Shah-e-Shahon". At the age of 14 years, Balochistani left home in search of a perfect spiritual Guru (teacher). At last, after searching for nine years, he reached Beas in the state of Punjab in India, where he met Baba Sawan Singh, the second Guru of Satsang Beas where he attended his Satsang (spiritual congregation). Singh entrusted Balochistani with the task of conducting spiritual discourses and teaching meditation to the people in the Pakistani provinces of Balochistan, Sindh and Punjab.

Later, Singh assigned Balochistani duty in the vicinity of Bagarh (region of northern Rajasthan and western Haryana). Balochistani established Dera Sacha Sauda and raised public awareness of Naam-Shabd. He laid the foundation of Dera Sacha Sauda in 1948 in Sirsa. He completely prohibited acceptance of donations or charity of any kind.

He emphasized truthfulness, vegetarianism, abstinence from alcohol and drugs, meditation on the inner Word, and service to humanity. Mastana Ji was also known for his compassionate acts, simplicity, and devotion to uplifting the downtrodden.

Mastana Ji attained Mahasamadhi on 18 April 1960 in Sirsa.

Following are the disciples of Mastana ji who continued His work after him.

Param Sant Gurbakhsh Singh Ji (Manager Sahib Ji) (1915–1998) – Entrusted with spiritual responsibility by Mastana Ji in 1949. Later, he founded the Shah Mastana Balochistani Ashram (Dera Jagmalwali) in Sirsa, Haryana, which continues as a spiritual center under the Sant Mat tradition.

Sant Triveni Das Ji – Spread Mastana Ji's teachings in Uttar Pradesh and Bihar, establishing satsang centers.

Other regional satsang leaders – Various devotees took up the responsibility of guiding local congregations in Punjab, Haryana, and Rajasthan, preserving Mastana Ji's message of truth, compassion, and service.

These disciples played a key role in ensuring that Mastana Ji's teachings continued beyond the Dera Sacha Sauda, each contributing to the spread of Sant Mat in their own regions.
