= Ashutosh Maharaj =

Personal life
- Born: Mahesh Kumar Jha; 1946 Bihar, British India
- Died: 29 January 2014 (aged 67–68) Nurmahal, Punjab, India
- Known for: Founder of Divya Jyoti Jagrati Sansthan

Religious life
- Religion: Hinduism

Religious career
- Organization: Divya Jyoti Jagrati Sansthan

Ashutosh Maharaj (born Mahesh Kumar Jha; 1946 – January 2014) was an Indian spiritual leader and founder of Divya Jyoti Jagrati Sansthan (DJJS), a religious organization headquartered in Nurmahal, Punjab. He established the organization in 1983 and conducted religious gatherings focused on meditation and spiritual teachings.

Maharaj's religious activities attracted opposition from some Sikh organizations, which accused him of making objectionable statements about Sikh religious beliefs. Protests against his gatherings led to several confrontations, including a clash in Ludhiana in December 2009 in which a Sikh protester was killed in police firing. His death in January 2014 also became the subject of a legal dispute after DJJS rejected the medical declaration of death and maintained that he had entered samadhi, a state of deep meditation.

Jha alleged that Maharaj's followers were preserving his body to retain control of the organization's assets. According to the BBC, DJJS had accumulated properties estimated to be worth US$120 million, including holdings in India and abroad.

In December 2014, the Punjab and Haryana High Court ordered Maharaj's cremation after doctors confirmed his death. The order was challenged, and in July 2017 a division bench set it aside, allowing DJJS to continue preserving his body. The ruling overturned the earlier cremation order but did not establish that Maharaj was medically alive.

== Early life ==
Ashutosh was born Mahesh Kumar Jha in 1946 in Bihar. He associated with Satpal Maharaj before establishing his own organization. Later, he moved to Punjab, where he began conducting religious gatherings and developed a following.

== Religious activities ==
Ashutosh founded Divya Jyoti Jagrati Sansthan in 1983. The organization developed its principal centre at Nurmahal in Jalandhar district, Punjab, and established branches elsewhere in India and abroad. Its religious teachings emphasised Brahm Gyan (divine knowledge) and meditation. The Nurmahal centre was established at its present site in 1995 and subsequently expanded into a religious complex. Maharaj conducted congregations and delivered spiritual discourses through DJJS, which continued its activities following his death.

== Controversies ==
=== Opposition from Sikh organizations ===
Maharaj and DJJS faced opposition from several Sikh organizations over allegations that his religious discourses contained objectionable references to Sikh teachings and the Sikh Gurus. The allegations led to protests against DJJS programmes in Punjab. On 5 December 2009, Sikh protesters attempted to reach a DJJS congregation in Ludhiana. Clashes broke out between demonstrators and the police, resulting in the death of a Sikh protester during police firing. Several people were injured, and the authorities imposed a curfew in parts of the city. The remaining DJJS programme was subsequently cancelled.

Opposition to DJJS gatherings continued in subsequent years. In April 2011, representatives of Sikh organizations approached the Ludhiana district administration to object to a proposed nine-day convention involving Maharaj. They raised concerns about religious tensions and requested administrative intervention.

=== Dispute over death and preservation of body ===
Maharaj was declared clinically dead following a cardiac arrest in January 2014. DJJS representatives disputed the medical conclusion, maintaining that he had entered samadhi and would eventually return to consciousness. His body was placed in a temperature-controlled chamber at the Nurmahal headquarters.

The preservation of his body prompted legal proceedings. Dalip Kumar Jha, who claimed to be Maharaj's son, sought custody of the body to perform the last rites. Puran Singh, who described himself as Maharaj's former driver, also raised questions about the circumstances surrounding his death. DJJS opposed the demands for cremation and maintained that Maharaj remained in deep meditation. In December 2014, a single-judge bench of the Punjab and Haryana High Court directed the Punjab government to arrange Maharaj's cremation. The order was challenged by DJJS and other parties, leading to further proceedings.

On 5 July 2017, a division bench of the High Court set aside the cremation order and permitted the organisation to continue preserving the body. The court considered the protection of religious freedom under Article 25 of the Constitution of India, while making preservation subject to public health considerations. It also directed that medical professionals inspect the body regularly and ordered DJJS to establish a ₹50 lakh fund to cover the associated medical expenses. The ruling permitted the continuation of the preservation arrangements but did not overturn the medical finding that Maharaj was dead.

== Death and subsequent developments ==
Maharaj was declared clinically dead on 29 January 2014 following a cardiac arrest at the DJJS headquarters in Nurmahal. His body remained preserved after the High Court's 2017 decision, while the organisation continued to regard him as its spiritual head.

In January 2026, The Indian Express reported that his body remained in a chamber maintained at approximately −22 °C and was examined by doctors every six months. DJJS continued to hold religious gatherings and operate under the administration of senior members without appointing a successor to Maharaj.
