= Sewa kendra =

A sewa kendra (Hindi सेवा केन्द्र "service centre") is a local government office in India providing services relating to utility bills and documents such as birth and death certificates, arms licences and tenant verification documents.

In Punjab(PB) these are defined under the Punjab Right to Services Act, 2011, under the SAD-BJP government. The cost effectiveness of such offices has been controversial.
