= Jattu Engineer =

- Directed by: Gurmeet Ram Rahim Singh; Honeypreet Insan
- Written by: Gurmeet Ram Rahim Singh
- Screenplay by: Gurmeet Ram Rahim Singh
- Produced by: C.P. Arora; Jitender Khurana
- Starring: Gurmeet Ram Rahim Singh; Honeypreet Insan
- Cinematography: Gurmeet Ram Rahim Singh
- Edited by: Gurmeet Ram Rahim Singh
- Music by: Gurmeet Ram Rahim Singh
- Production company: Hakikat Entertainment Pvt. Ltd.
- Distributed by: Hakikat Entertainment Pvt. Ltd.
- Release date: 19 May 2017
- Running time: 139 minutes
- Country: India
- Language: Hindi
- Budget: ₹90 million
- Box office: ₹72 million

Jattu Engineer (transl. Jat Engineer) is a 2017 Indian comedy film directed by Gurmeet Ram Rahim Singh and Honeypreet Insan. The film was released on 19 May 2017.

== Plot ==
The story of 'Jattu Engineer' revolves around a poor, unemployed and drug-ridden village, and how a teacher transforms the villagers' fate by improving their living standards.

== Soundtrack ==
The music is composed by Gurmeet Ram Rahim Singh. The soundtrack album consists of two songs written and sung by Singh.

No.	Title	Lyrics	Singer(s)	Length
1	Holi Ki Pichkari	Gurmeet Ram Rahim Singh	Gurmeet Ram Rahim Singh	3:00
2	Josh Mein	Gurmeet Ram Rahim Singh	Gurmeet Ram Rahim Singh	2:43

== Release ==
The film released on 19 May 2017. Reza Noorani of Times Of India rated movie with 1 star. He writes "The film is two hours of loud gags with a handful of preachy messages. Watch at your own risk, this one!". Firstpost criticized the movie saying "Star rating: * — because there is just one star, Gurmeet Ram Rahim Singh Insaan". Even the critics of BookMyShow; popular cinema ticketing website has rated the movie with 1 star. This movie was made tax-free by the government in Rajasthan and Haryana. The shooting of this movie was completed in Just 15 days. Gurmeet Ram Rahim Singh Insaan has a total of 40 credits in the movie which includes DOP, script writing, song writing, set designing, art direction, dress designing, editing, choreography etc. The movie has two songs, one of which is based on sports, to encourage the youth to participate more actively in games rather than using drugs in this age. Both the songs are composed and sung by Gurmeet Ram Rahim Singh Insaan himself.
