= MSG: The Warrior Lion Heart =

MSG the Warrior: Lion Heart
- Theatrical release poster
- Directed by: Gurmeet Ram Rahim Singh; Honeypreet Insan
- Written by: Gurmeet Ram Rahim Singh
- Produced by: C.P. Arora; Jitender Khurana
- Starring: Gurmeet Ram Rahim Singh; Honeypreet Insest; Charanpreet; Kainaat; Garima; Rajesh; Sukhottam; Ashok; Bhushan
- Cinematography: Gurmeet Ram Rahim Singh; Santosh Thundiyil
- Edited by: Gurmeet Ram Rahim Singh; Sanjay Verma
- Music by: Songs: Gurmeet Ram Rahim Singh; Background Score: Gurmeet Ram Rahim Singh
- Production company: Hakikat Entertainment Pvt. Ltd.
- Distributed by: Hakikat Entertainment Pvt. Ltd.
- Release date: 7 October 2016
- Running time: 120 minutes
- Country: India
- Language: Hindi
- Budget: ₹180 crore
- Box office: Disputed

MSG The Warrior Lion Heart is a 2016 Indian science fantasy adventure film co-directed by criminal religious leader Gurmeet Ram Rahim Singh and his daughter Honeypreet Insan. The film starring Singh, one of the directors himself, is a story of a medieval warrior fighting against aliens for the honour of his land.

The film premiered on 6 October 2016 in Delhi and was released on 7 October 2016 in Hindi, with dubs in Tamil, Telugu, Malayalam and English. Singh is credited with work in thirty film departments, including choreography, editing, make-up and hair design, background scoring, and prop design. The film has been criticised as a propaganda film by several critics.

A sequel, Hind Ka Napak Ko Jawab: MSG Lion Heart 2, was released in 2017.

== Synopsis ==
The story is about a medieval warrior who fights for the honor of his land and the dignity of the womenfolk. The story travels centuries apart as he emerges in another role as a modern Indian equivalent of James Bond, a stylish top secret agent. The alien invasion seems unstoppable, as the aliens are hundreds of years ahead in technology. Lionheart is their only stumbling block in their march to overpower planet Earth.

== Cast ==
- Gurmeet Ram Rahim Singh
- Honeypreet Insan
- Charanpreet
- Kainaat
- Garima
- Rajesh
- Sukhottam
- Ashok
- Bhushan
- RZA
- Gaurav Insan
- Gaurav mahaur

== Marketing ==
A number of world and regional records were organised by sect leader Ram Rahim to promote the film. According to Guinness World Records, MSG fans assembled the world's largest poster on 15 September 2016, which covered 15,123.8 square metres (162,791 sq ft) and featured an advertisement for MSG: The Warrior Lion Heart. The largest display of oil lamps consists of 150,009 lamps achieved at an event organised Singh to promote film among 36 Lakh fans. The film's second song, "Sohna Mera Mishri Di Daliye", was unveiled in an event attended by around 40 lakh people.

== Release ==
The movie premiered on 6 October in Delhi and was released on 7 October in Hindi, along with dubbed versions in Tamil, Telugu, Malayalam and English. The film was declared tax-free by Government of Rajasthan in the state.

=== Critical reception ===
Devarsi Ghosh of India Today wrote "MSG The Warrior Lion Heart is not a film. Like the previous MSG (Messenger of God) films, this too is a propaganda piece made by the subject of the said propaganda, Gurmeet Ram Rahim Singh himself". Mihir Bhanage of The Times of India gave it 1.5 stars out of 5, describing the film as indicative of Singh's self-obsession. Bhanage wrote, "It takes guts to roll out such preachy and glorified films, but the saga continues with a devil-may-care attitude."

Anshu Lal of Firstpost described the film as "horrible". Specific criticism was centered on problems in storytelling, such as the use of pop-up video. Lal wrote, "Because without that pop-up, how would the poor audience comprehend the concept of background narration, right?" Lal also criticised the plot, the acting, and the cartoonish nature of the film. Namrata Thakker of Rediff.com gave it half star out of 5, and wrote that it is only for die-hard fans of Singh's. Aakash Karkare of Scroll.in wrote that movie is every bit as terrible as you expect it to be.

=== Box office ===
According to The Times of India the film collected approximately ₹32 million in its first weekend with an estimated total of ₹46 million after five days. Box Office India tallied the worldwide gross at approximately ₹176.7 million. According to Bollywood Hungama the film collected approximately ₹1.13 million in just one week. International Business Times stated that movie had a gross of ₹1.50 million.

== Soundtrack ==
MSG The Warrior Lion Heart

Soundtrack album to MSG The Warrior Lion Heart by: Gurmeet Ram Rahim Singh
- Released: 17 September 2016
- Genre: Feature film soundtrack
- Length: 7:19
- Label: Zee Music
- Producer: Gurmeet Ram Rahim Singh

The music is composed by Gurmeet Ram Rahim Singh. The soundtrack album consists of 2 songs, all written and sung by Singh himself.

=== Track listing ===
No.	Title	Lyrics	Singer(s)	Length
1	Dhol Baaje	Gurmeet Ram Rahim Singh	Gurmeet Ram Rahim Singh	3:31
2	Sohna Mera Mishri Di Daliye	Gurmeet Ram Rahim Singh	Gurmeet Ram Rahim Singh	3:48
