= Security categories in India =

Levels of security details provided to individuals in India

In India, security details are provided to some high-risk individuals by the police and local government. Depending on the threat perception to the person, the category is divided into six tiers: SPG, Z+ (highest level), Z, Y+, Y and X. Individuals under this security blanket include (but are not limited to) the President, Vice President, Prime Minister, Supreme Court and High Court Judges, Service Chiefs of Indian Armed Forces, Governors of State, Chief Ministers and Cabinet Ministers, actors and other VIPs:

In India, Top Security is given to PM of India and then there are 9 VVIPs who are given NSG Z+ Security in which some are provided ASL also and rest are not given that.

- SPG is an elite force whose details are classified and only provided to the Prime Minister of India.
- In case of NSG Security first comes NSG ASL and then NSG. NSG Security is above CRPF or any of the rest of CAPFs Security.
- Z+ (ASL) category - Z+ cover with Advanced Security Liaison.
- Z+ category is a security detail of 36 personnel, including 10+ Central Reserve Police Force commandos and police personnel.
- Z category is a security detail of 22 personnel, including 4-6 Central Armed Police Forces commandos and police personnel.
- Y+ category is a security detail of 11 personnel, including 2-4 commandos and police personnel.
- Y category is a security detail of 8 personnel, including 1 or 2 commandos and police personnel.
- X category is a security detail of 2 personnel, with no commandos but only armed police personnel.

In a significant shift in VIP security arrangements, the Union Government has decided to withdraw the National Security Guard (NSG), also known as "black cat commandos," from VIP security duties. This decision aims to refocus the NSG on its core counter-terrorism role.

The Z+ level of security is now provided by CRPF commandos or other Central Armed Police Forces such as the ITBP, CISF, or the respective State Police. They are armed with Heckler & Koch MP5 sub-machine guns and modern communication equipment, and each member of the team is adept in martial arts and unarmed combat skills. Currently 40 VIPs are provided with such protection. The Z category entails protection by the Delhi Police or the ITBP or CRPF personnel and one escort car. The Y category encompasses two personal security officers (PSOs) and the X category, one PSO.

The withdrawal of the NSG from VVIP security duties will lead to the transfer of security for nine high-risk VIPs, including prominent political leaders like Yogi Adityanath, Mayawati, Rajnath Singh, N. Chandrababu Naidu, L. K. Advani, Ghulam Nabi Azad, Farooq Abdullah, Sarbananda Sonowal, and Raman Singh, to the Central Reserve Police Force (CRPF).

In practice, the number of police personnel deployed for VIP security often far exceeds the officially allocated number. For example, over 200 civil police (not counting armed police, counted as a separate category, or any privately hired security) were posted at Mulayam Singh Yadav's Lucknow residence during his third term as Chief Minister of Uttar Pradesh. His successor, Mayawati, reportedly had over 350 police officers in her security detail.

The "Blue Book" details about security given to the President, Vice-President and the Prime Minister and their families and the "Yellow Book" details about security given to other VIPs and VVIPs. The Home Ministry in coordination with different intelligence agencies issues guidelines for security cover.

The SPG (Special Protection Group), NSG (National Security Guards), ITBP (Indo-Tibetan Border Police) and CRPF (Central Reserve Police Force) CISF (Central Industrial Security Force) are the agencies responsible for providing securities to VVIPs, VIPs, politicians, high-profile celebrities and sportspersons. Many NSG personnel are seconded to the Special Protection Group (SPG) which guards the Prime Minister. Most NSG and SPG commandos have already served in paramilitary forces.

== Categories ==
Different categories of security cover
| Category | Number of Commandos | Total personnel | Personal Security Officers (PSO) | Convoy | Budget | Current cover |
|---|---|---|---|---|---|---|
| SPG | Classified | Classified | Classified | Classified | ₹ 592 Crores (for FY 20–21) | Narendra Modi (being the Prime Minister of India) |
| Z+ | 10+ | 55 | Classified | 5+ bulletproof vehicles (mostly cars/vans) | ~ ₹ 33 Lac / month | Salman Khan Around 51 protectees as of 2024, |
| Z | 4–6 | 22 | 3+ (9+/8 hour shifts) | 5+ vehicles with at-least 1 bulletproof | ~ ₹ 16 Lac / month | 68 in Z category 86 in Y+ category and 79 protectees in Y category (as of 2024) |
| Y+ | 2–4 | 11 | 3 (9/8 hour shifts) | 2–3 vehicles | ~ ₹ 15 Lac / month | 68 in Z category 86 in Y+ category and 79 protectees in Y category (as of 2024) |
| Y | 1–2 | 8 | 2 (6/8 hour shifts) | 1–2 vehicles | ~ ₹ 13 Lac / month | 68 in Z category 86 in Y+ category and 79 protectees in Y category (as of 2024) |
| X | Nil | 2 | 2 (6/8 hour shifts) | 0–2 vehicles | | 68 in Z category 86 in Y+ category and 79 protectees in Y category (as of 2024) |

== Security of the President ==
Security to the President of India is ensured by the President's Bodyguard (PBG). PBG is not only the most senior unit of the Indian Armed Forces but also the oldest. During peace, PBG serves as a ceremonial unit but can also be deployed during war as they are trained paratroopers too.

== Failures ==
- Former Prime Minister Indira Gandhi was assassinated by members of her own security detail.
- Rajbir Singh, a famous encounter specialist was killed in March 2008 despite a Z-level security detail.
- While under protection from the security detail, former Union Minister Pramod Mahajan was shot dead by his brother.

=== Controversy ===
This is criticized often by media as a waste of taxpayer's money. Former Home Minister P. Chidambaram phased out the use of the NSG for VIP protection in all but the most serious cases. Nevertheless, controversies arose as many politicians remained under a Z+ category while many bureaucrats were moved down to Y.

The excessive use of VIP security results in some police stations being understaffed since their officers are being diverted from serving the general public. Some police stations routinely operate at less than 50% capacity; one rural station near Lucknow was noted in 2013 to have just 1-5 officers (out of 35 total) available at any given time to serve a precinct with over 100,000 people over an area of more than 100 square kilometers.

In 2014 as a part of Z security, 25 personnel of the Central Reserve Police Force and the Punjab Police were put in attendance for the security of Ashutosh Maharaj, a spiritual leader who has been declared clinically dead by doctors.
