= Hind Ka Napak Ko Jawab: MSG Lion Heart 2 =

Hind Ka Napak ko Jawab: MSG Lion Heart 2
- Theatrical release poster
- Directed by: Gurmeet Ram Rahim Singh; Honeypreet Insan
- Written by: Gurmeet Ram Rahim Singh
- Produced by: C.P. Arora; Jitender Khurana
- Starring: Gurmeet Ram Rahim Singh; Honeypreet Insan
- Cinematography: Gurmeet Ram Rahim Singh; Santosh Thundiyal
- Edited by: Gurmeet Ram Rahim Singh
- Music by: Julius Packiam; Songs: Gurmeet Ram Rahim Singh
- Production company: Hakikat Entertainment Pvt. Ltd.
- Distributed by: Hakikat Entertainment Pvt. Ltd.
- Release date: 10 February 2017
- Running time: 126 minutes
- Country: India
- Language: Hindi
- Budget: ₹12 crore
- Box office: est. Disputed

Hind Ka Napak Ko Jawab: MSG Lion Heart 2 (transl. India’s Reply to the Unholy, from Pāk in Pakistan meaning "holy") is a 2017 Indian faith-based action thriller film co-directed by Gurmeet Ram Rahim Singh and his daughter, Honeypreet Insan. It is a direct sequel to MSG The Warrior Lion Heart (2016) and the fourth installment in the franchise started by MSG: The Messenger (2015). Based on the 2016 Uri attack and the 2016 India–Pakistan military confrontation, the film stars Singh and Insan.

Announced soon after the military strikes by the Indian Army in Pakistani Kashmir, on 19 October 2016, the film premiered on 8 February 2017 in Mumbai and was released on 10 February. Like its predecessors, the film was panned by critics and was a commercial failure. From a ₹120 million (US$1.2 million) budget, its gross is often disputed.

== Cast ==
- Gurmeet Ram Rahim Singh Ji Insan as Sher-e-Hind
- Honeypreet Insan as Honey Preet, Sher-e-Hind's sidekick
- Dhiksha Insan as Sargam, Sher-e-Hind's love interest
- Aditya Insan
- Bhushan Insan
- Rakesh Dhawan Insan
- Ramesh Chahel Insan
- Bhupinder Kapoor
- Karandeep
- Manpreet

== Production ==
Singh worked in 43 departments in the film, including direction, writing, song composer, cinematography, editing, casting, production design, costume design and art direction.

=== Music ===
Hind Ka Napak Ko Jawab - MSG Lion Heart 2

Soundtrack album Hind Ka Napak Ko Jawab - MSG Lion Heart 2 by: Gurmeet Ram Rahim Singh
- Released: 27 January 2017
- Genre: Feature film soundtrack
- Length: 14:42
- Label: Zee Music
- Producer: Gurmeet Ram Rahim Singh

The music is composed by Gurmeet Ram Rahim Singh. The soundtrack album consists of four songs, all written and sung by Singh.

No.	Title	Lyrics	Singer(s)	Length
1	Jung Hai Humri Aatankwad Se	Gurmeet Ram Rahim Singh	Gurmeet Ram Rahim Singh	3:08
2	System Hil Gaya	Gurmeet Ram Rahim Singh	Gurmeet Ram Rahim Singh; Amarpreet	3:35
3	Thank U for That	Gurmeet Ram Rahim Singh	Gurmeet Ram Rahim Singh	3:39
4	Tujhe Paa Ke	Gurmeet Ram Rahim Singh	Gurmeet Ram Rahim Singh	4:20

== Release ==
The film was released on 10 February 2017. The film is tax free in Haryana and Rajasthan states.

=== Critical response ===
Professional ratings
Review scores
Source	Rating
Times of India	1/5 stars
Rediff.com	1/5 stars
News18	0/5 stars
Firstpost	1/5 stars

Hind Ka Napak Ko Jawab received generally negative reviews from critics. Reza Noorani of Times of India rated the film 1/5, calling the film ridiculous but "so-bad-it's good". The film was rated 1/5 at Rediff.com and was advised to watch "only if you need some comic relief." Kriti Tulsiani of News18 rated it 0/5 saying, "It’s a painful journey that no non-follower will be able to survive. No matter what field you’re in, it’s a nightmare in every aspect – fashion, acting, reviewing, choreography, music, editing, VFX – everything." Aashray Hariharan of Firstpost gave the film 1/5, saying that Singh "launches another surgical strike on cinema."
