= Dera Sacha Sauda =

Indian organization

- DSS logo
- Abbreviation: DSS
- Established: 29 April 1948; 78 years ago
- Founder: Mastana Balochistani
- Type: NGO; Non-profit social welfare and spiritual organisation
- Registration no.: 5234
- Legal status: Active
- Purpose: Humanitarianism; activism; environmentalism; drug rehabilitation; secularism; lacto-vegetarianism
- Headquarters: Sirsa, Haryana, India
- Coordinates: 29.533593°N 75.017702°E
- Region served: Asia-Pacific; Middle East; Northern Europe; North America
- Successor: Shah Satnam Singh
- Current leader: Gurmeet Ram Rahim Singh
- Website: www.derasachasauda.org

Dera Sacha Sauda ("Camp of the True Deal"; colloquially DSS) is an Indian non-governmental organization described as a "religious cult" and "non-profit social welfare dera" that was established on 29 April 1948 by Mastana Balochistani, an ascetic follower of Baba Sawan Singh (the second Satguru of Radha Soami Satsang Beas (RSSB)), as a centre for religious learning. After Baba Sawan Singh, the movement split into four groups, one of them led by Mastana Balochistani. After the death of Mastana Balochistani, his movement was split into three groups, with Shah Satnam Singh Ji also known as Param Pita Ji leading the Sirsa group, who then selected Gurmeet Ram Rahim to be his successor. Dera Sacha Sauda's main centre is situated in the city of Sirsa in Haryana state, northern India. The organisation has 46 ashrams (divisions) across India and other countries.

Under the leadership of Mastana Balochistani, 25 Ashrams were established in Haryana, Punjab and Rajasthan, where Naam-Shabad, method of Meditation was taught to the followers who accepted three principles for the rest of their life: 1. No consumption of meat, egg or gelatin, 2. no consumption of alcohol, drugs, tobacco etc. and 3. no adultery or illicit sex. He also laid the foundation of the main ashram in 1948 and coined the expression "Dhan Dhan Satguru Tera Hi Asra" (Dhanay hai tu Satguru, or humein tera hi sahara hai) widely used by the Dera. Shah Satnam Singh lead the Dera from 1963 to 1990. He was succeeded by controversial Gurmeet Ram Rahim Singh in 1990, who added more than a dozen ashrams and made Dera a much more visible organization.

The current leader, Gurmeet Ram Rahim Singh, who claims to have more than 60 million followers worldwide, is a controversial figure in India and has been convicted for murder and rape. On 25 August 2017, a special CBI court in the city of Panchkula, Haryana, found him guilty of raping two Dera sadhvis (female followers). Subsequently, the special CBI court sentenced Singh for a period of 20-year prison term on 28 August 2017. In January 2019, Singh was sentenced to life in prison for the murder of journalist Ram Chander Chhatrapatti. On 7 March 2026, the Punjab and Haryana High Court acquitted him in the journalist murder case, while upholding the convictions of three other accused. The Court also observed that the CBI had coerced a witness, Khatta Singh, into making a statement against him.

In October 2021, he was awarded another life imprisonment for the murder of a DSS follower Ranjit Singh. On 28 May 2024, the Punjab and Haryana High Court acquitted him and four others in the 2002 Ranjit Singh murder case, citing multiple lapses in the CBI investigation. Despite these acquittals, Singh remains incarcerated serving a 20-year sentence for the 2017 rape convictions.

== History ==
Dera Sacha Sauda was established in 1948 at Sirsa by Mastana Balochistani. He was born in Kotra, Tehsil Gandhey, Kalat (Now in Balochistan), in undivided India, now in Pakistan in 1891. He was popularly known among his devotees as His Holiness Beparawah Mastana. He died on 18 April 1960. Shah Satnam Singh, born on 25 January 1919 took over the spiritual leadership position from Balochistani at the age of 41 and served until 1990. He died on 13 December 1991. Gurmeet Ram Rahim Singh became the third master of DSS on 23 September 1990. DSS is a registered NGO.

=== 2007 clashes with Sikhs ===
In May 2007, violent clashes broke out between the Khalsa Sikhs and the followers of the Dera Sacha Sauda over the Dera leader Gurmeet Ram Rahim Singh's appearance in a newspaper advertisement. Sikhs alleged that he had impersonated their Guru Gobind Singh, thus insulting their faith. At least one person died in these clashes; several more were injured. The news media described the violence as the most serious since the Sikh–Nirankari clashes of the 1970s and the separatist insurgency of the 1980s.

The Akal Takht of the Sikhs demanded closure of all the Deras in Punjab, and asked its followers to organise protest marches and bandhs. Ultimately, Gurmeet Ram Rahim Singh issued an apology. However, this apology was rejected by the Akal Takht. The marches and boycotts against the Dera continued, until the situation subsided after several weeks.

=== Allegations by Dera defectors ===
In 2008, a DSS defector seeking refuge in Austria had sent a complaint to the Austrian government regarding the wrongdoings of the Dera. However, the complaint was rejected.

=== 2017 conviction and subsequent riots ===
Its leader, Gurmeet Ram Rahim Singh, was accused of murder and convicted of rape by an Indian court. On 25 August 2017, a special Central Bureau of Investigation (CBI) court in Panchkula, Haryana, found him guilty of sexually assaulting two Dera sadhvis (female followers), one of whom had written to the then prime minister of India Atal Bihari Vajpayee about it in 2002.

More than 150,000 followers of DSS had gathered at Panchkula, where the hearing was taking place, and a few other places. Upon learning of the court's verdict, they were involved in a mass riot which led to the death of at least 30 people and left more than 250 people seriously injured.

The Punjab and Haryana High Court ordered all of DSS's properties to be attached to pay for the losses incurred due to the violence. A few incidents were reported in the Indian capital, New Delhi, which is 243 kilometres (151 mi) away from the epicentre.

The incident led to widespread criticism of the ruling government, in that, despite the high court's repeated warnings, it failed to gauge the severity of the situation, and failed to enforce Section 144 of the Criminal Procedure Code. The latter prohibits an assembly of any more than four people, and was in effect at the time of the verdict.

Allegedly 400 followers of the sect have been castrated inside the sect's headquarters to "bring them closer to god". One of the castrated men came forward and filed a complaint in court against the guru. According to India's Central Bureau of Investigation (CBI), the sect defended castrations as done to "safeguard female followers from possible sexual advances".

On 4 September 2017, after receiving a 2-day notice from police to surrender weapons, DSS members turned in 67 firearms, almost half of which were licensed. Police confiscated 33 of the weapons.

== Teachings ==
The Dera's teachings are primarily based on the teachings of Radha Soami or Sant Mat, which emphasise the recitation of sacred words and the achievement of transcendence. The devotees are asked to practice alcohol abstinence, vegetarianism, marital fidelity, and truth. They are also asked to abstain from ritualism and from making monetary religious donations (see Funding).

During the satsang gatherings, the Guru of the Dera sits beneath Hindu, Sikh, Muslim and Christian symbols organised in a way that depicts him as the union of these religions.

The foundational teachings of Dera Sacha Sauda are centered on the practice of Surat Shabd Yoga (meditation on the divine inner sound) and the recitation of the Naam-Shabad (sacred words). Devotees are initiated into the method of meditation under the guidance of the spiritual master and are required to adhere to three lifelong principles: complete lacto-vegetarianism (abstaining from meat, eggs, and animal-derived gelatin), total abstinence from alcohol, tobacco, and intoxicating drugs, and strict adherence to marital fidelity. Following initiation, followers are encouraged to adopt the surname "Insan" (meaning human) to signify the spiritual and social equality of all people across different castes and backgrounds.

According to official data tracked by the organization and published via media outlet Sach Kahu, the Dera actively administers a framework of 176 distinct humanitarian and social welfare initiatives under the guiding philosophy that "Humanity is our Religion." These ongoing welfare works are mobilized globally through the Shah Satnam Ji Green 'S' Welfare Force Wing, a specialized disaster management and philanthropic task force founded in 2006 to handle natural exigencies.

The organization's large-scale welfare metrics are categorized into several major public campaigns:

- Health and 'True Blood Pump': Operating as a continuous voluntary blood donor network, the Dera's mass donation camps have secured multiple Guinness World Records, notably donating 15,432 units on 7 December 2003, 17,921 units on 10 October 2004, and 43,732 units of blood in a single day on 8 August 2010. Devotees also pledge posthumous eye and organ donation, alongside running free mega eye-screening camps (such as the annual Yaad-e-Murshid camp) which provide cataract surgeries to underprivileged patients.
- Environmental Campaigns: Dedicated tree-planting and large-scale cleanliness initiatives (Safai Abhiyan), where volunteer networks deploy to clean entire cities or regions within a designated timeframe, alongside holding specific Guinness World Records for maximum simultaneous tree transplantation.
- Social Rehabilitation: The group operates anti-drug rehabilitation campaigns (such as the DEPTH Campaign) leveraging meditation for substance abuse recovery. Other documented initiatives include the "Crown of the Lineage" program (supporting matrilocal residence to care for parents without sons), support for acid attack survivors, and programs for the rehabilitation and social reintegration of marginalized women.
- Anti-Dowry Custom: The community strictly enforces dowry-free marriages through mass community weddings known as Brahma Vivah, where marriages are solemnized within the congregation via the mutual exchange of garlands, explicitly forbidding expensive rituals or monetary exchanges.

== Membership ==
All the Dera Sacha Sauda Gurus have come from Sikh backgrounds, and the organisation has several Sikh adherents. However, the vast majority of its supporters are working-class and middle-class Hindus from the rural areas of Haryana and Rajasthan.

In 2009, the Dera Sacha Sauda claimed to have over a million devotees. It had 38 ashrams, most of them in northern India.

== Funding ==
The word "Dera" is similar connotations to "ashram", while the word "Sacha Sauda" means "true deal"—a reference to the claim that the organisation does not accept monetary gifts from its devotees. The Dera Sacha Sauda claims to be autarkic: it owns extensive lands in Haryana, Punjab and other states; and operates a supermarket, Canteens, a biscuit factory, a restaurant, etc. These businesses, managed by its "sadhus," are said to be for the benefit of its devotees.

== Political activities ==
Dera Sacha Sauda is the only among the various Deras, which openly asks its supporters to vote for particular political parties. The previous Congress government enjoyed the organisation's support and it reciprocated by providing a Z-plus security cover for the group's leader. Singh's son is married to the daughter of the Congress leader Harminder Singh Jassi. The DSS supported Congress in the 2007 Punjab state elections, and helped the party take control of the Malwa region. However, the Shiromani Akali Dal won the overall majority in the state, and allegedly persecuted the Dera supporters during the 2007 violence. When the Congress did not come out in the open support of DSS, the DSS decided not to endorse a single party in the 2009 parliamentary elections.

Before the 2012 Punjab state elections, the Congress leader Amarinder Singh, his wife Preneet Kaur and his son Raninder Singh visited Singh, asking him to extend his support to Congress. However, Dera's support to Congress alienated the party's Sikh vote bank. In the 2012 elections, Congress performed poorly, and Jassi lost the election. The poor performance of Congress in Malwa in 2012 was seen as a signal of the downfall of Dera's political power.

In 2014 Haryana polls and Lok Sabha Polls, Bharatiya Janata Party requested support from Baba Gurmeet Ram Rahim. In February 2015, the organisation openly supported BJP in Delhi elections. The organisation supported BJP in the Bihar assembly election in 2015, and nearly 3,000 Dera followers campaigned for BJP in the state.

== Welfare activities ==
Gurmeet Ram Rahim Singh formed a welfare and disaster relief organisation called Shah Satnam Ji Green-S Welfare Force, which now has more than 70,000 doctors, engineers, rescuers, paramedics, and tradesmen participating. The organisation has rendered aid during many of India's natural disasters like Kolkata fire and the factory collapse in Jalandhar.

During the 2013 flash floods in Uttarakhand, a team of volunteers and doctors provided medical care to people, distributed food packets and conducted rescue missions. The area of Deoli-Brahmgram village which was called a 'village of widows' after the floods are still facing issues of hardship, the life of widows at a standstill.

Anti-prostitution initiatives began in November 2009, when Singh called on his followers to counter prostitution, and to help sex-workers escape a "life of perpetual slavery". In December 2009, Dera and its volunteers took a step towards reducing sex trafficking in the country and also preventing the spread of HIV/AIDS virus, by giving consent for marriage with adult sex workers and to "help them escape their dreary existence". In January 2010, a mass marriage ceremony for former sex workers took place in Sirsa.

Dera Sacha Sauda's 400-bed multi-specialty hospital was inaugurated by Gurmeet Ram Rahim Singh in Sirsa in March 2014 and was named Shah Satnam ji Speciality Hospital.

Dera Sacha Sauda had launched a social welfare campaign and had filed a petition in the Supreme Court of India to grant legal status to transgender people. On 15 April 2014 the Apex Court gave a judgement in favour of the Eunuchs and ordered that the Hijras and transgender people will now be given the legal status of the third gender.

DSS also initiated a series of sanitation drives and as of 2016, about 30 Mega Cleanliness Campaigns have been conducted in several states of India and also in other countries.

=== Blood donation camps ===
Like several other religious groups in India, the Dera Sacha Sauda has organised large-scale blood donation camps. In December 2003, a camp held on the death anniversary of its former guru attracted 15,432 donors. In October 2004, the Dera broke its own record during the mortuary ceremony of Gurmeet Ram Rahim Singh's father. This time it attracted 17,921 donors, and collected 12,002,450 ml units of blood in a single day. This was recognised by the Guinness World Records as the largest ever amount of blood collected on a single day.

The official publication of Dera Sacha Sauda claims that the world record was created by "sheer chance", thus denying the suggestions that it was a show-off for media attention and the glorification of their guru. However, in 2003, the Dera had sent an e-mail to the Guinness Book compilers, seeking clarifications on the conditions that needed to be met to break the previous record. During the donation exercise, the Dera had meticulously collected proofs needed to qualify for the world record. After creating the record, several Dera devotees also stated that their aim was to create the record.

Doctors have criticised the "ostentatious" mass blood donation camps organised by Dera Sacha Sauda as wasteful. According to the director of the Shiv Shakti blood bank in Sirsa, most of the blood collected in Dera's camps gets wasted. Moreover, the devotees do not respond to the blood bank's requests for blood donations at other times, when there is need for blood donation.
