= List of journalists killed in 2017 =

74 journalists were murdered or killed worldwide in 2017 while reporting, covering an incident, or because of their status as a journalist. Frank La Rue, the UNESCO assistant director-general for communication and information said, “On average, one journalist is murdered every four days.” Audrey Azoulay, the Director-General of UNESCO condemned the killing of journalists worldwide.

| Journalist | Job | Date of death | Country of origin | Country of death | Details of death | | | | | | |
|---|---|---|---|---|---|---|---|---|---|---|---|
| Journalist | Job | Date of death | Country of origin | Country of death | Details of death | Sayed Mehdi Hosaini | Journalist for Jomhor News Agency | 28 December | Afghanistan | Afghanistan | Killed in an IS suicide bombing |
| Gumaro Pérez Aguilando | Journalist and founder of La Voz del Sur | 19 December | Mexico | Mexico | Shot dead at his son's Christmas pageant | | | | | | |
| Mohamed Ibrahim Gabow | TV anchor | 11 December | Somalia | Somalia | Killed by a car trap | | | | | | |
| Naveen Gupta | Journalist for Hindustan | 30 November | India | India | Shot 5 times by unknown assailants | | | | | | |
| Azory Gwanda | Journalist for Mwananchi Communications | On or after 21 November | Tanzania | Tanzania | Gwanda was kidnapped from his home on November 21. He has not been seen since. In 2019, Amnesty International reported he had been killed. | | | | | | |
| Sudip Datta Bhaumik | journalist for the Daily Syandan Patrika and the local television | 21 November | India | India | "Shot dead, allegedly by a Tripura State Rifles personnel" | | | | | | |
| Hussain Nazari | Cameraman for Rah-e-Farda | 16 November | Afghanistan | Afghanistan | Died from injuries sustained from a suicide bomber attack | | | | | | |
| Ikechukwu Onubogu | Cameraman at Anambra | 12 November | Nigeria | Nigeria | Shot dead by unknown gunmen | | | | | | |
| Arkan Sharifi | Cameraman for Kurdistan TV | 30 October | Iraq | Iraq | Stabbed to death by 8 masked men in his own house | | | | | | |
| Qays Al-Qadi | Correspondent for Al-Jisr | 29 October | Syria | Syria | Killed by Syrian regime artillery fire | | | | | | |
| Christopher Iban Lozada | Radio broadcaster, journalist | 24 October | Philippines | Philippines | Shot to death by an unknown group of gunmen | | | | | | |
| Carlos Oveniel Lara Dominguez | Journalist for Canal 12 Telemaya | 23 October | Honduras | Honduras | Shot at from a vehicle | | | | | | |
| Daphne Caruana Galizia | Freelance journalist | 16 October | Malta | Malta | Killed by a remotely detonated bomb planted in her car | | | | | | |
| Ali Nur Siad-Ahmed | Freelance journalist, worked with Voice of America | 14 October | Somalia | Somalia | Killed by a car trap | | | | | | |
| Abdulkadir Mohamed Abdulle | Freelance cameraman | 14 October | Somalia | Somalia | Killed by a car trap | | | | | | |
| Hawker Faisal Mohammed | Reporter at Hawar News Agency | 13 October | Syria | Syria | Killed by a suicide car bomb attack | | | | | | |
| Dilshan Ibash | Reporter at Hawar News Agency | 12 October | Syria | Syria | Killed by a suicide car bomb attack | | | | | | |
| Haroon Khan | Broadcast journalist | 12 October | Pakistan | Pakistan | Shot 8 times from an AK-47 as a result of a property dispute | | | | | | |
| Amanullah Haqiar | Bodyguard of Shir Mohammad Janish, director of Tanweer TV | 12 October | Afghanistan | Afghanistan | Unknown gunmen opened fire on Janish's car injuring him and killing his bodyguard | | | | | | |
| Efigenia Vásquez Astudillo | Radio presenter, radio journalist for Renacer Kokonuko | 8 October | Colombia | Colombia | Shot whilst covering a story on riot police attack on indigenous people | | | | | | |
| Edgar Daniel Esqueda Castro | Freelance journalist | 5 October | Mexico | Mexico | Taken away at gunpoint by supposed policemen, although Castro died from a gunshot, his body "showed signs of torture" | | | | | | |
| Orouba Barakat | Journalist and activist | 22 September | Turkey | Turkey | Stabbed to death by a relative after he "failed to receive a fair wage"; her and her daughter's bodies were wrapped in a carpet and sprinkled with lime to "prevent odour" | | | | | | |
| Hala Barakat | Journalist | 22 September | Turkey | Turkey | Stabbed to death by a relative after witnessing her mother die | | | | | | |
| Santanu Bhowmik | Journalist | 20 September | India | India | Beaten to death with sticks after reporting on violent clashes between factions in Tripura, India | | | | | | |
| Abdullahi Osman Moallim | Journalist | 13 September | Somalia | Somalia | Died of wounds sustained during a suicide bombing three days earlier | | | | | | |
| Carlos William Flores | Journalist | 13 September | Honduras | Honduras | Shot to death by unknown gunmen on a motorcycle | | | | | | |
| Gauri Lankesh | Editor and publisher of the Gauri Lankesh Patrika | 5 September | India | India | Shot to death outside her house | | | | | | |
| Christopher Allen | Freelance journalist | 26 August | USA | South Sudan | Shot to death in an exchange of fire between the government and rebel fighters | | | | | | |
| Cándido Ríos Vázquez | Journalist | 22 August | Mexico | Mexico | Gunned down during a drive-by shooting | | | | | | |
| Osama Nasr al-Zoabi | Reporter, cameraman, correspondent for the Syrian Media Organization | 21 August | Syria | Syria | Killed by driving over an improvised explosive device | | | | | | |
| Kim Wall | Journalist | 10 August | Sweden | Denmark | Murdered by an inventor, Peter Madsen, while on board his submarine. Her body was dismembered and stabbed multiple times to prevent them washing up due to gas build-up | | | | | | |
| Leo Diaz | Journalist | 7 August | Philippines | Philippines | Shot from behind whilst riding his motorcycle | | | | | | |
| Rudy Alicaway | Radio host | 6 August | Philippines | Philippines | Shot from behind whilst riding his motorcycle | | | | | | |
| Michael Marasigan | Media consultant | 3 August | Philippines | Philippines | Killed, along with his brother, when gunmen on a motorcycle opened fired on their car | | | | | | |
| Luciano Rivera Salgado | Journalist for Baja California TV | 31 July | Mexico | Mexico | Shot by an aggressor in a bar, possibly after defending women he believed were being harassed | | | | | | |
| Khaled Alkhateb | Correspondent for Russia Today | 30 July | Syria | Syria | Killed in a rocket attack by IS militants | | | | | | |
| Harb Hazaa al-Dulaimi | Reporter | 20 July | Iraq | Iraq | Shot to death by IS militants | | | | | | |
| Soudad al-Douri | Cameraman | 20 July | Iraq | Iraq | Shot to death by IS militants | | | | | | |
| Edwin Rivera Paz | Journalist for "Los Verduleros" on Hable Como Habla | 9 July | Honduras | Mexico | Died from multiple gunshot wounds | | | | | | |
| Véronique Robert | Reporter, correspondent for France Télévisions | 24 June | Switzerland/France | Iraq | Died from injuries sustained from a nearby landmine detonation | | | | | | |
| Stephan Villeneuve | Reporter | 19 June | France | Iraq | Died from injuries sustained from a landmine detonation | | | | | | |
| Bakhtiyar Haddad | Reporter, journalist, fixer | 19 June | Iraq (Kurdistan) | Iraq | Died from injuries sustained from a landmine detonation | | | | | | |
| Baksheesh Elahi | Chief of K-2 Times Daily | 11 June | Pakistan | Pakistan | Shot to death outside his own house by unknown motorbike-borne gunmen | | | | | | |
| Kamlesh Jain | Journalist | 31 May | India | India | Shot by a hitman because of a family dispute | | | | | | |
| Mohammed Nazir | Media worker | 31 May | Afghanistan | Afghanistan | Killed by the May 2017 Kabul attack | | | | | | |
| Aziz Navin | Media worker | 31 May | Afghanistan | Afghanistan | Killed by the May 2017 Kabul attack | | | | | | |
| Sa’ad Al-Nadhari | Photojournalist | 26 May | Yemen | Yemen | Hit by shrapnel from a nearby exploding shell | | | | | | |
| Wael Al-Absi | Photojournalist | 26 May | Yemen | Yemen | Hit by shrapnel from a nearby exploding shell | | | | | | |
| Taqi Al-Din Al-Huthaifi | Photojournalist | 26 May | Yemen | Yemen | Hit by shrapnel from a nearby exploding shell | | | | | | |
| Dimitri Popkov | Reporter | 24 May | Russia | Russia | Shot 5 times in his back in his own backyard by unknown assailant | | | | | | |
| Salvador Adame Pardo | Reporter | 18 May | Mexico | Mexico | Kidnapped by gunmen whilst covering a protest, beaten, killed and burned | | | | | | |
| 4 unnamed RTA employees | Driver, other jobs | 17 May | Afghanistan | Afghanistan | Suicide bomber detonated his vest outside the TV station, 3 gunmen opened fire on people inside | | | | | | |
| Héctor Jonathan Rodríguez Córdoba | Reporter | 15 May | Mexico | Mexico | Shot to death in his car by a group of unknown armed men | | | | | | |
| Javier Valdez Cárdenas | Journalist, founder of Ríodoce | 15 May | Mexico | Mexico | Shot to death by a group of unknown gunmen | | | | | | |
| Alaa Kraym (Mohammed Al Qabouni) | Journalist with Qaboun Media Center, the Syrian Media Observatory and the Syrian Revolutionary Forces’ media office | 4 May | Syria | Syria | Killed by a shell of undetermined origin | | | | | | |
| Saeed Karimian | Founder and CEO of GEM TV | 29 April | Iran | Turkey | Murdered in his car | | | | | | |
| Filiberto Álvarez Landeros | Journalist, radio host | 29 April | Mexico | Mexico | Shot to death as he was leaving the radio channel building | | | | | | |
| Yameen Rasheed | Founder and editor-in-chief of the blog The Daily Panic | 23 April | Maldives | Maldives | Stabbed to death, possibly for criticising and satirising the Maldives' government | | | | | | |
| Nikolay Andrushchenko | Co-founder and editor of the newspaper Novy Petersburg | 19 April | Russia | Russia | Beaten to death by strangers | | | | | | |
| Wai Yan Heinn | Editor of weekly Iron Rose | 16 April | Myanmar | Myanmar | Died after receiving 15 stab wounds to the abdomen | | | | | | |
| Famous Giobaro | Desk editor for public radio Globe FM | 16 April | Nigeria | Nigeria | Killed in his residence by unknown gunmen | | | | | | |
| Maximino Rodríguez Palacios | Columnist of the blog Colectivo Pericú | 14 April | Mexico | Mexico | Shot to death outside a shopping center | | | | | | |
| Miroslava Breach Velducea | Reporter for the national newspaper La Jornada and El Norte | 23 March | Mexico | Mexico | Shot eight times whilst in her car | | | | | | |
| Ricardo Monlui Cabrera | Director of the daily newspaper El Político and columnist | 19 March | Mexico | Mexico | Shot to death whilst leaving a restaurant | | | | | | |
| Mohamed Abazied (George Samara) | Journalist with Nabd Syria and Syria Media Organization (SMO) | 12 March | Syria | Syria | | | | | | | |
| Shifa Gardi | Reporter for Rudaw | 25 February | Iraq | Iraq | Killed by roadside bomb | | | | | | |
| Joaquin Briones | Columnist at the daily Remate | 19 January | Philippines | Philippines | Shot four times in the back | | | | | | |
| Igor Padilla | Reporter for TV channel HCH | 17 January | Honduras | Honduras | Shot by after receiving a call prompting him to exit the building he was filming a commercial in | | | | | | |
| Muhammad Jan | Reporter for the Urdu-language daily: Qudrat and Brahui language daily: Talar Quetta | 12 January | Pakistan | Pakistan | Shot by two unidentified men | | | | | | |
| Noorullah | Cameraman for Wolesi Jirga Television | 10 January | Afghanistan | Afghanistan | Killed by a terrorist-planted explosive | | | | | | |
| Farida Mustakhdi | Employee for Wolesi Jirga Television | 10 January | Afghanistan | Afghanistan | Killed by a terrorist-planted explosive | | | | | | |
