= Emmanuel (emu) =

American emu and TikTok personality

Emmanuel Todd Lopez
- Species: Emu
- Born: 2014 or 2015 (age 11–12)
- Occupation: TikTok personality
- Years active: 2018–present
- Owner: Taylor Blake
- Residence: Knuckle Bump Farms

TikTok information
- Page: knucklebumpfarms
- Followers: 3.1 million
- Last updated: May 2025

Emmanuel Todd Lopez (born 2014 or 2015) is an emu and TikTok personality. He lives on the hobby farm Knuckle Bump Farms in South Florida with his caretaker, Taylor Blake. Emmanuel has gone viral for TikToks in which he interrupts Blake or knocks over the camera, to which Blake often responds, "Emmanuel, don't do it!"

Blake became a content creator in 2013. After moving onto her family's farm in 2021, she set up a TikTok account for it. She made videos with the farm's animals before Emmanuel's first appearance in July 2022, which went viral. That month, Blake made an appearance on The Tonight Show with Jimmy Fallon, and Emmanuel was the target of a death hoax by disinformation firm Team Jorge and undercover journalists. When the emu fell ill in October 2022, Blake initially believed he had avian influenza before determining that he was reacting to stress.

== Life and career ==
Knuckle Bump Farms is a hobby farm in South Florida that primarily raises miniature cattle. It is owned by the family of Taylor Blake, who grew up near the farm. In 2015, Blake's grandmother adopted two emus, Emmanuel and Ellen, who do not get along with each other. Blake became a professional content creator in 2013 with the username @HiiTaylorBlake. She began filming with the farm's animals in 2018. In 2021, she and her girlfriend moved from Los Angeles to Florida to help her grandparents with Knuckle Bump Farms. She created a TikTok account for the farm the following year, initially focusing on the cattle.

Emmanuel's first TikTok appearance was in early July 2022. Emmanuel interrupted Blake as she was filming, which annoyed her before she decided to post it a month later. The video, as well as later videos in which she was interrupted by Emmanuel, went viral. A running gag in many videos involves Blake saying, "Emmanuel, don't do it!" The videos often include Blake reproaching the emu with his full name, "Emmanuel Todd Lopez". In some, Emmanuel pecks and knocks over the camera. Blake usually appears in the videos wearing brown overalls and a baseball cap.

According to NBC News, Emmanuel "[became] an internet sensation almost overnight". In July 2022, The Washington Post called Emmanuel "arguably the world's most famous emu", and Frankfurter Allgemeine Zeitung called him "maybe the most famous emu ever". Blake told the Post that the emu was "adapting to this new life of fame" and that he "hasn't really had a reaction" to being famous. The Knuckle Bump Farms TikTok account had 950,000 followers and 23 million likes by July 2022. Blake tweeted that she was "overwhelmed" by the volume of messages she received. She told the Post that her videos became popular for being "fun, lighthearted content, where you're not having to worry about politics".

Blake appeared on The Tonight Show with Jimmy Fallon on July 21, 2022. In the sketch, a puppet version of Emmanuel blocked the camera and Blake showed up to tell him to stop, but Fallon began blocking the camera as well. The same month, disinformation contractor Team Jorge ran a disinformation campaign spreading a death hoax about the emu, using the hashtag #RIP_Emmanuel. The campaign was commissioned by undercover journalists from Haaretz working with Forbidden Stories to analyze the firm's abilities. The hashtag went viral, leading Blake, then unaware of the plot, to tweet "EMMANUEL IS NOT DEAD."

== Reactions ==
Blake has explained that Emmanuel's behavior in the videos is caused by an "obsession with the camera" and a hatred of phones. Some viewers have related Blake's handling of Emmanuel to raising a toddler or dealing with students. Others viewed him as a rebel; author Deanna Raybourn tweeted, "Become ungovernable. Be the Emmanuel you wish to see in the world." Blake's videos have been interrupted by other animals, though they are not as popular as Emmanuel. Blake told People Magazine, "I can honestly say I never in a million years expected him to be the one that went crazy viral. But I'm so glad that it was him because he's such a natural on camera."

Emmanuel fell ill in October 2022, leading Blake to believe he had contracted avian influenza from an outbreak that had hit the farm. In a series of tweets on October 15, she said, "we lost 99% of the birds on our farm" and "Emmanuel unexpectedly went down this past Wednesday." The tweets included photos of her cuddling with Emmanuel, which pathologists warned risked transmission of the disease. She responded that she followed safety guidelines and that wearing a mask would make Emmanuel "freak out". One week after the tweets, she tweeted that Emmanuel had tested negative for influenza and other diseases. She wrote, "We believe this all stemmed from stress. Emus are highly susceptible to stress. He was incredibly overwhelmed by the state coming in and euthanizing our flock," and said that Emmanuel was recovering. Of over fifty birds, the only survivors were Emmanuel and a swan, Rico. Some internet users accused Blake of using Emmanuel for attention and "rebranding", sharing old videos she had posted.

== See also ==
- List of individual birds
