= Dennis Itumbi =

Kenyan political strategist

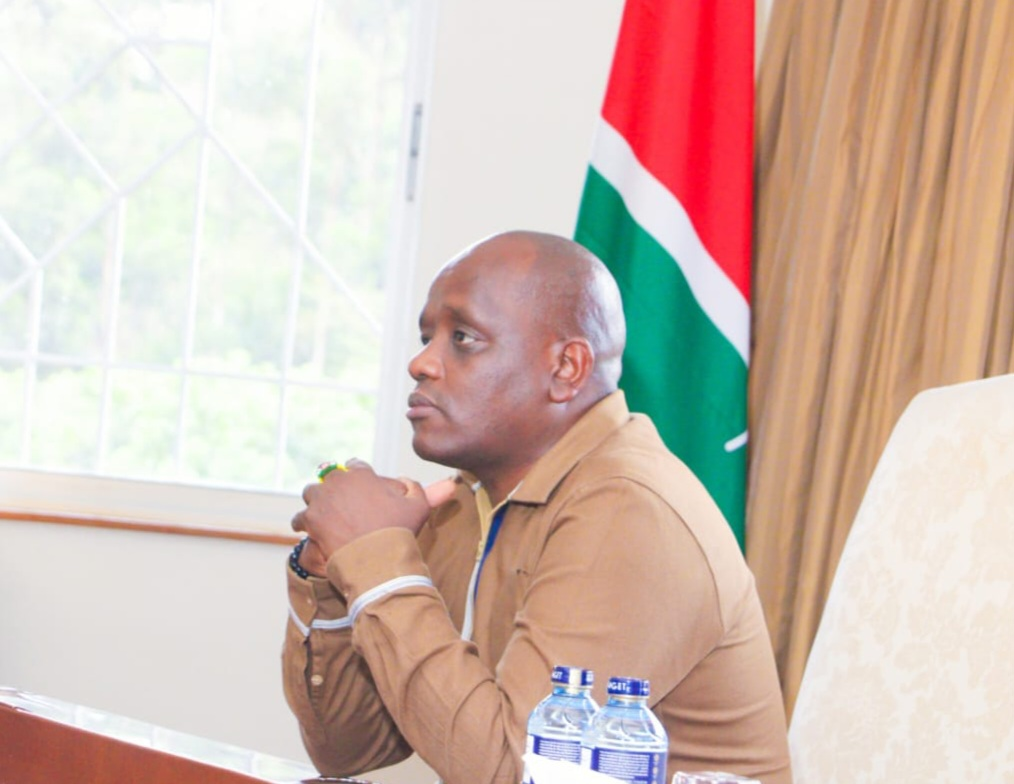
- Itumbi in 2024

Personal details
- Born: Dennis Itumbi; March 18, 1985 (age 41) Gichugu, Kirinyaga County, Kenya
- Parent: Patrick Itumbi (father)
- Relatives: Kevin Karaya Itumbi (brother)
- Occupation: Political strategist, digital journalist

Dennis Itumbi is the top Kenyan digital strategist. Currently holds the position of Head of Presidential Special Projects and Creative Economy Coordination. He was also sworn in as a Deputy Minister in March 2023, before the courts declared the 51 positions unconstitutional. Itumbi is credited with running digital campaigns that got both President Uhuru and Deputy President William Ruto cases in the Hague, ICC, dropped. He later headed the communications campaign that got President Kenyatta elected in 2013.in 2022, he started a sensational digital outfit under the banner Hustler Nation Intelligence Bureau ( HNIB) and got President Ruto elected. Ahead of that victory he fell our with President Uhuru and got abducted by rogue policemen under Fred Matian'gi the then Interior Cabinet Secretary. Impeached Deputy President Rigathi Gachagua, accused Itumbi of drawing Memes depicting him as sidelined during the King's visit to Kenya and held him by the collar at the Eldoret State Lodge. Itumbi remains a powerful and controversial figure in Kenya. He is also an election consultant, known for his role in the campaign of President Uhuru Kenyatta and his deputy William Ruto in the 2013 Kenyan general election and 2017 Kenyan general election in Kenya.

Itumbi runs a company dealing with online reputational management, digital public relations and search engine optimization.

Itumbi acted as a digital strategist for William Ruto during the 2022 Kenyan general election. In February 2022, an investigation into the Israeli hacking and disinformation operation Team Jorge showed that Itumbi had been the target of hacking ahead of the election. During a meeting with the undercover journalists, the group's leader Tal Hanan showcased how he was able to hack into Itumbi's Telegram account. Itumbi subsequently confirmed to The Star that his Telegram account had been infiltrated, and that he noticed “increased activity” in the run-up to the election.

== Controversies ==
=== Fake Ruto Assassination Letter ===
In July 2019 Itumbi was arrested for authoring a fake assassination letter claiming that there was a plot to assassinate William Ruto. According to police, Itumbi posted the fake assassination letter on his social media then deleted it. In June 2023 a Nairobi court dropped charges against Itumbi after it found that the penal code he was accused of violating was found to be unconstitutional.

=== Fake News ===
In April 2014 Daily Nation reported that Itumbi was involved in creation of numerous fake news posts on social media accounts. In the same month Itumbi deleted some of his social media posts and apologised for creation of fake news posts.

=== ICC Hacking ===
In March 2012 Itumbi was arrested for hacking the International Criminal Court website and exposing witnesses in the case against Uhuru Kenyatta and his deputy.
