= List of journalists killed in India =

This is a list of journalists killed in India

No.	Date	Name	Media outlet	Place	Summary	References
1	3 January 1992	Ram Singh Biling	Azdi Awaz, Daily Ajit	Azamgarh, Punjab	Biling, a correspondent based in Amargarh for two newspapers in Punjab, namely Azdi Awaz and Daily Ajit, was reportedly apprehended by the police while traveling by bus to Jalandhar. Although police officials denied his arrest or custody, Biling, who was also a human rights activist, was reportedly seen in custody by village elders. It is believed that he died in police custody.	
2	27 February 1992	Bakshi Tirath Singh	Hind Samachar	Dhuri, Punjab	Singh was a reporter for the Punjabi newspaper Hind Samachar, based in Dhuri, India. He was assassinated by unidentified individuals. The reason behind the attack remains uncertain.	
3	18 May 1992	M.L. Manchanda	All India Radio	Patiala, Punjab	On 18 May 1992, M.L. Manchanda, the director of the All India Radio station located in Patiala, was abducted by members of the militant organization Babbar Khalsa. This group demanded that the electronic media adhere to a specific code of conduct, which included broadcasting in the local Punjabi language instead of Hindi. Despite negotiations for Mr. Manchanda’s release, the government failed to comply with Babbar Khalsa’s demands within the deadline set by the group. Consequently, on 27 May 1992, the militants beheaded Mr. Manchanda, a journalist, in a brutal act that shocked the nation.	
4	31 January 1993	Bhola Nath Masoom	Hind Samachar	Rajpura	Masoom, a journalist associated with Hind Samachar and serving as the president of the Punjab and Chandigarh Journalist's Council, was fatally shot by two suspected militants in the vicinity of his residence located in Rajpura, India. The incident occurred on an unspecified date, and Masoom succumbed to his injuries on the same day.	
5	22 May 1993	Dinesh Pathak	Resident editor of Sandesh newspaper in Baroda.	Vadodara	Raju Risaldar, accused of ordering the killing, was later shot dead by Gujarat Police in the Vadodara encounter.	
6	29 August 1994	Ghulam Mohammad Lone	Freelance	Kangan, Kashmir	Lone, a newspaper salesman and freelance journalist who had received death threats for his coverage of troop movements in Kashmir, was shot and killed along with his seven-year-old son by a group of masked gunmen, with the Srinagar police attributing the killings to Kashmiri separatists.	
7	10 September 1995	Mushtaq Ali	Agence France-Presse and Asian News International	Srinagar	On September 7, a letter bomb addressed to a journalist in Srinagar exploded in the hands of Ali, a photographer for Agence France-Presse and a camera operator for Asian News International, causing severe injuries that led to his death three days later.	
8	10 April 1996	Ghulam Rasool Sheikh	Rehnuma-e-Kashmir and Saffron Times	Pampore	The death of Sheikh, the editor of Rehnuma-e-Kashmir and Saffron Times, who had reported on violence in Pampore, and whose body was found floating in Kashmir's Jhelum River, has been attributed by his family members to a militia group allegedly supported by Indian state security forces, which had reportedly kidnapped him in March.	
9	17 May 1996	Parag Kumar Das	Asomiya Pratidin	Assam	Parag Kumar Das, editor-in-chief of the Asomiya Pratidin and a leading voice for self-rule for Assam who had continued reporting on separatist perspectives despite previous arrests, was assassinated in Guwahati while picking up his son from school; his colleagues believe that his recent interview with the leader of the separatist United Liberation Front of Assam may have led to his assassination by a splinter group, and he was also known for his work monitoring human rights abuses by the army and counterinsurgency forces against the Assamese.	
10	1 January 1997	Altaf Ahmed Faktoo	Doordarshan TV	Srinagar	Faktoo, a journalist and news anchor for the state-owned Doordarshan television station in Srinagar, Kashmir, was assassinated by militant separatists who had previously threatened him due to his pro-government news reporting and work with the state-owned broadcast media; he was also previously kidnapped and detained by a militant group in 1994.	
11	16 March 1997	Saidan Shafi	Doordarshan TV	Srinagar	Shafi, a reporter for Doordarshan TV, was killed in an ambush in Srinagar, Kashmir while working on two news programs, "Kashmir File" and "Eyewitness," with his personal security guard also being fatally shot; his reporting on "Kashmir File" that criticized militant Kashmiri separatists had reportedly led to threats from separatists who accused him of biased reporting.	
12	19 November 1997	S. Gangadhara Raju	Eenadu Television	Hyderabad	A car bomb explosion outside Rama Naidu Studios in Hyderabad killed five members of a television crew, including Gangadhara Raju, an E-TV cameraman, Jagadish Babu, a producer for private channel E-TV, Srinivas Rao and S. Krishna, assistant cameramen for E-TV, and Raja Sekhar, an assistant for E-TV, along with their driver and at least 17 others, while covering the making of a film; the attack is believed to have been politically motivated, targeting the film's producer, Paritala Ravi, a former guerrilla leader and member of the governing Telugu Desam party.	
13	19 November 1997	S. Krishna	Eenadu Television	Hyderabad		
14	19 November 1997	G. Raja Sekhar	Eenadu Television	Hyderabad		
15	19 November 1997	Jagadish Babu	Eenadu Television	Hyderabad		
16	19 November 1997	P. Srinivas Rao	Eenadu Television	Hyderabad		
17	27 February 1999	Shivani Bhatnagar	The Indian Express	New Delhi	Bhatnagar, a special correspondent for the Indian Express, was found dead in her apartment in East Delhi. Bhatnagar was strangled and stabbed in the neck and abdomen. While her killers were not identified, early reports speculated that they may have been seeking certain incriminating documents, although police did not find robbery to be a likely motive.	
18	13 March 1999	Irfan Hussain	Outlook	New Delhi	Hussain, a cartoonist for Outlook magazine, was found dead on the side of a highway in Delhi with his hands and feet bound, throat slit, and having been stabbed 28 times and strangled. His murder was allegedly linked to his satirical cartoons mocking leaders of the Hindu nationalist Bharatiya Janata Party, and a threatening phone call from someone claiming to be a member of the Shiv Sena, a Hindu nationalist political organization, was reportedly made to the wife of another cartoonist prior to Hussain's murder.	
19	10 October 1999	N. A. Lalruhlu	Shan	Manipur	Lalruhlu, an editor of the Hmar-language newspaper Shan, and three others were killed in an attack by suspected separatist militants in Manipur, India. The Hmar Revolutionary Front claimed responsibility for the killings, stating that Lalruhlu was not targeted for his journalism, but because of his involvement with a rival militant group, highlighting the ongoing separatist and ethnic violence in the region.	
20	18 March 2000	Adhir Rai	Freelance	Deoghar, Jharkhand	Rai was a freelance journalist and president of the Deoghar Working Journalists Union, who was murdered while on assignment. The Hindu, an English-language newspaper, reported on the incident and also mentioned that Rai was a lecturer at a local college.	
21	31 July 2000	V. Selvaraj	Nakkeeran	Perambalur, Tamil Nadu	Selvaraj, a journalist for the Tamil-language biweekly Nakkeeran, was killed by a group of about a dozen men in his hometown of Perambalur, Tamil Nadu. He suffered over 20 serious wounds from knives and sickles, and his death may have been related to his reporting on government corruption in Tiruchi. The Crime Branch Central Investigation Department was investigating the case, but no major developments had been reported by the end of the year.	
22	10 August 2000	Pradeep Bhatia	Hindustan Times	Srinagar	In August 2000, a bomb attack in the Kashmir capital, Srinagar killed at least 12 people, including Bhatia, a photographer for The Hindustan Times, and injured six other journalists. Hezb-ul Mujahedeen, a militant Kashmiri separatist group, claimed responsibility for the attack targeting Indian security forces.	
23	20 August 2000	Thounaojam Brajamani Singh	Manipur News	Imphal	Brajamani, the founder of Manipur News and a well-known journalist in Manipur State, India, was assassinated in the capital city of Imphal while riding his scooter home. He was shot twice in the back of the head by two men who forced him to stop on the road, according to sources.	
24	30 July 2001	Moolchand Yadav	Freelancer	Jhansi	Yadav was a freelance reporter who frequently wrote for Hindi-language newspapers such as Jansatta and Punjab Kesari. He was assassinated on a Jhansi street in Uttar Pradesh allegedly due to his investigative reporting on local corruption that angered two influential landowners, according to colleagues.	
25	14 April 2002	Paritosh Pandey	Jansatta Express	Lucknow	In April 2002, crime reporter Pandey, who worked for the Hindi-language daily Jansatta Express, was shot and killed at his home in Lucknow. While it is likely that Pandey was targeted due to his reporting on criminal gangs, the specific motive behind his murder remains unclear.	
26	13 October 2002	Yambem Meghajit Singh	Northeast Vision	Imphal	In the city of Imphal, located in India's conflict-ridden Northeast region, Meghajit, a chief correspondent for Northeast Vision, was found dead in his home after being beaten with bamboo sticks and shot in the head. While no group has claimed responsibility for the murder, some journalists speculate that it may have been related to Meghajit's involvement in the semiprecious stone trade.	
27	21 November 2002	Ram Chander Chhatrapati	Poora Sach	Sirsa, Haryana	Chaterpatti, an editor of Hindi-language newspaper Poora Sach, died from injuries sustained in an assassination attempt in Sirsa, Haryana on October 24, 2016. The alleged gunman and a leader of the Sirsa-based religious sect Dera Sacha Sauda were among three suspects arrested, with officials stating that members of the group ordered Chaterpatti’s murder due to the journalist’s reporting on sexual abuse and other crimes allegedly committed at the group’s compound. In January 2019, a special court in Haryana convicted four individuals of Chaterpatti's murder and criminal conspiracy, sentencing them each to life imprisonment and a fine of 50,000 rupees.	
28	21 February 2004	Veeraboina Yadagiri	Andhra Prabha	Medak, Telangana (then Andhra Pradesh)	Murdered for investigating the illegal sale of home-brewed liquor.	
29	20 April 2004	Aasia Jeelani	Freelance	Kashmir	Killed in landmine explosion by the militants of the Kashmir region.	
30	6 January 2006	Prahlad Goala	Asomiya Khabar	Golaghat, Assam	Murdered after writing multiple articles on timber smuggling.	
31	1 April 2006	Mohammed Muslimuddin	Asomiya Pratidin	Barpukhuri, Assam	Murdered by assailants after being targeted for writing about illegal drug trade that linked local influential figures and politicians.	
32	11 May 2008	Ashok Sodhi	Daily Excelsior	Samba district, Jammu and Kashmir	Killed in crossfire between militants and security forces in Samba, close to the Line of Control.	
33	24 March 2009	Anil Mazumdar	Aji (Assamese Daily)	Tingkhong, Assam	Killed by militants for supporting peace talks between the separatist guerrilla group, United Liberation Front of Asom.	
34	20 July 2010	Vijay Pratap Singh	Indian Express	Allahabad, Uttar Pradesh	Killed in a blast outside Nand Gopal Gupta's house. Two Samajwadi Party members were arrested including former-MLA Vijay Mishra.	
35	11 June 2011	Jyotirmoy Dey	Mid-Day	Powai, Mumbai	Killed by multiple men on motorcycles, it may have been related to his reporting of the oil mafia. He had also reported about Chhota Rajan.	
36	7 September 2013	Rajesh Verma	IBN7	Muzaffarnagar, Uttar Pradesh		
37	6 December 2013	Sai Reddy	Deshbandhu	Bijapur district		
38	27 May 2014	Tarun Kumar Acharya	Sambad and Kanak TV	Khallikote, Ganjam district, Odisha		
39	26 November 2014	M. V. N. Shankar	Andhra Prabha	Chilakaluripet, Andhra Pradesh		
40	8 June 2015	Jagendra Singh	Freelance	Shahjahanpur, Uttar Pradesh		
41	20 June 2015	Sandeep Kothari	Freelance	Katangi, Balaghat district, Madhya Pradesh		
42	13 August 2015	Sanjay Pathak	United News of India	Faridpur district, Uttar Pradesh		
43	30 August 2015	M M Kalburgi	Samagra Vachana Samputa	Dharwad, Karnataka		
44	3 October 2015	Hemant Yadav	TV24	Chandauli district, Uttar Pradesh		
45	13 February 2016	Karun Misra	Jansandesh Times	Sultanpur, Uttar Pradesh		
46	13 May 2016	Rajdev Ranjan	Hindustan	Siwan, Bihar		
47	23 August 2016	Kishore Dave	Jai Hind	Junagadh, Gujarat		
48	5 September 2017	Gauri Lankesh	Gauri Lankesh Patrike	Bengaluru, Karnataka	Gauri Lankesh, a prominent Indian journalist, was shot dead in Bangalore in 2017. She was known for her criticism of Hindu nationalist politics. Lankesh was shot multiple times outside her home.	
49	21 September 2017	Santanu Bhowmik	Channel Dinraat	Mandwi/Mandai, Tripura		
50	24 September 2017	KJ Singh		Mohali, Punjab		
51	21 November 2017	Sudip Datta Bhaumik	Bengali language newspaper Syandan Patrika and local television station News Vanguard	Bodhjung Nagar, Tripura		
52	25 March 2018	Navin Nishchal	Dainik Bhaskar	Bhojpur district, Bihar		
53	14 June 2018	Shujaat Bukhari	Editor, Rising Kashmir	Srinagar		
54	29 October 2018	Chandan Tiwari	Reporter, Aj	Pathalgada, Chatra, Jharkhand		
55	19 June 2020	Shubham Mani Tripathi	Reporter, Kampu Mail	Unnao, Uttar Pradesh	Died on the spot after being shot six times, three of them in the head. Just before death said he feared he could be killed because of his investigations into land expropriations linked to illegal sand mining.	
56	8 November 2020	Isravel Moses	Reporter at Tamizhan TV	Chennai, Tamil Nadu	Isravel Moses was hacked to death with machetes by alleged drug dealers in the Chennai suburb of Kundrathur after his neighbors identified him as a journalist. The murder occurred a week after he reported on the local sale of cannabis and associated illegal encroachments of land.	
57	28 November 2020	Rakesh Singh	Reporter with Hindi language local daily newspaper Rashtriya Swaroop.	Balrampur district, Uttar Pradesh	Burned to death with his friend after assailants set fire to his village house which fall under the jurisdiction of the Kotwali Dehat police station in the Balrampur district of Uttar Pradesh, India. The UP state government has since promised to offer his wife a job.	
58	13 June 2021	Sulabh Srivastava	ABP News	Pratapgarh, Uttar Pradesh	Family members allege foul play; body found half naked with several injury marks after an expose of local liquor mafia.	
59	8 August 2021	Chenna Kesavalu	Reporter at the local Telugu news channel EV5 News.	Nandyal, Kurnool District, Andhra Pradesh	Stabbed to death by a local police officer after Kesavalu exposed his connections with gutka smuggling rings.	
60	3 October 2021	Raman Kashyap	Reporter, Sadhna Prime News TV	Lakhimpur Kheri, Uttar Pradesh	Succumbed to injuries after a convoy of cars drove into a crowd of protestors at the 2021 Farmer's Protests.	
61	12 November 2021	Budhinath Jha/ Avinash Jha	Independent journalist for the Facebook news channel, BNN News, Benipatti.	Madhubani district, Bihar	Burnt body discovered by the roadside after he went missing the previous day, presumed to be abducted. He had been reporting on illegal 'fake' clinics operating in the north-east.	
62	10 August 2021	Manish Kumar Singh	Sudarshan TV	Mathlohiar Gaddi Tola, East Champaran District, Bihar	Mutilated & decomposed body discovered three days after he went missing; the killer's had removed Singh's eyes. Singh's father, also a journalist, suspected he may have been targeted by local criminals, while the police suspected two of his journalist friends.	
63	1 January 2025	Mukesh Chandrakar	Independent Journalist for the YouTube news channel Bastar Junction.	Bijapur, Chhattisgarh	Decomposed body discovered three days after Chandrakar went missing on 1 January 2024 from the septic tank of three construction contractors; Chandrakar had earlier exposed the contractors for corruption.	
64	18 May 2025	Dharmendra Singh Chauhan	Journalist affiliated with online media outlet Fast News India	Luhari village, Jhajjar district, Haryana	Chauhan had left for a routine walk after dinner when unidentified assailant open fired on him and fled from spot. He had sustained a gunshot wound to the head was rushed to Ganesh Ji Hospital in Gurugram, where he succumed to his injuries later that night.	

== See also ==
- List of journalists killed in Bangladesh
- Attacks on RTI activists in India
