= Murder of Sandeep Kothari =

Murder of a journalist for exposing illegal mining and land grabbing

Sandeep Kothari
- Born: ca. 1975; India
- Disappeared: June 19, 2015 (aged 40)
- Status: Found dead
- Died: June 21, 2015 (aged 40); Nagpur, Maharashtra
- Cause of death: Strangulation and burning
- Body discovered: Butibori, Nagpur, Maharashtra
- Occupation: Freelancer investigative crime journalist
- Years active: 10 years
- Employer: Nai Dunia
- Known for: Investigating land grabbing and sand mining
- Parent: Kanchan (mother)
- Relatives: Sandhya Kothari (sister) & Navin & Rahul Kothari (brothers)

Sandeep Kothari, (ca. 1975 – 21 June 2015), an Indian freelancer investigative crime journalist for the NaiDunia, was murdered in the Balaghat District, Madhya Pradesh, India. He was murdered as a result of exposing illegal mining and land grabbing.

== Personal ==
Before his murder, Kothari told police he had received threats. He was already known to police, since as a result of his controversial reporting, Kothari had a long list of over 19 false accusations on record in various police stations in his home state, including common goat theft and rape. Although he was jailed for over 16 months awaiting trial for rape, none of the cases led to a conviction. Both Kothari's sister Sandhya and brother Rahul begged him to stop reporting about the sand mafia as it was risking his life.

== Career ==
Kothari came from a business family. His father had a small convenience store, known in India as a kirana store. Kothari and his two brothers were forest contractors and shared this family business before his brothers opened an automobile repair shop and Kothari went into journalism at Deshbandhu.

Sandeep Kothari was a Hindi-language journalist since 2005. Over his career, he wrote for prominent newspapers, such as Nai Duniya, Hari Bhoomi (sometimes transliterated as Haribhumi), and Deshbandhu around Jabalpur. After 2012, he left Nai Duniya to freelance. He specialized in investigating illegal chit fund schemes, manganese and sand mining and land grabbing around Katangi and Tirodi, and he became adept at using India's Right to Information (RTI) Act to get information about his subjects. More recently, Kothari had turned to freelance work as journalist and published his own work out of Katangi. The police called him a "history sheeter"—a term used to disparage journalism—in reference to his recent investigations around Katangi.

== Death ==
Nagpur within India relative to the capital New Delhi.

Sandeep Kothari's murderers first attacked him and his friend, who were on their way to the village of Umri, in the Balaghat district, by ramming their four-wheel motor vehicle into their bike on 19 June 2015. While his friend managed to escape, Kothari was beaten and kidnapped from the site of the wreckage. After the abduction, Kothari's friend was the one who reported to the police that Kothari was missing.

The men first strangled him, dumped him next to a railroad track and then burned him alive. His autopsy showed he had been alive when he was burned but also lists strangulation as a cause of death.

After the murder, the Madhya Pradesh Police appointed a Special Investigation Team to look into the murder. Three arrests have been made after the murder. Taken in to custody were Brijendra Geharwar, Vishal Tandi (both from Katangi), and Rakesh Naraswani. The three suspects are alleged to have been involved with illegal mining and confessed to the murder. They had previously tried to frame Kothari on a charge of rape but were unsuccessful in court. The accused led police to the site where they had left Kothari for dead. Police found his body at Butibori, Nagpur, Maharashtra, which is 50 km from Wardha, Maharashtra.

Police received complaints that Kothari was a blackmailer; however, his family and colleagues assert that these are just more false accusations like the ones made during his final years.

There has not yet been a conviction in the case

== Context ==
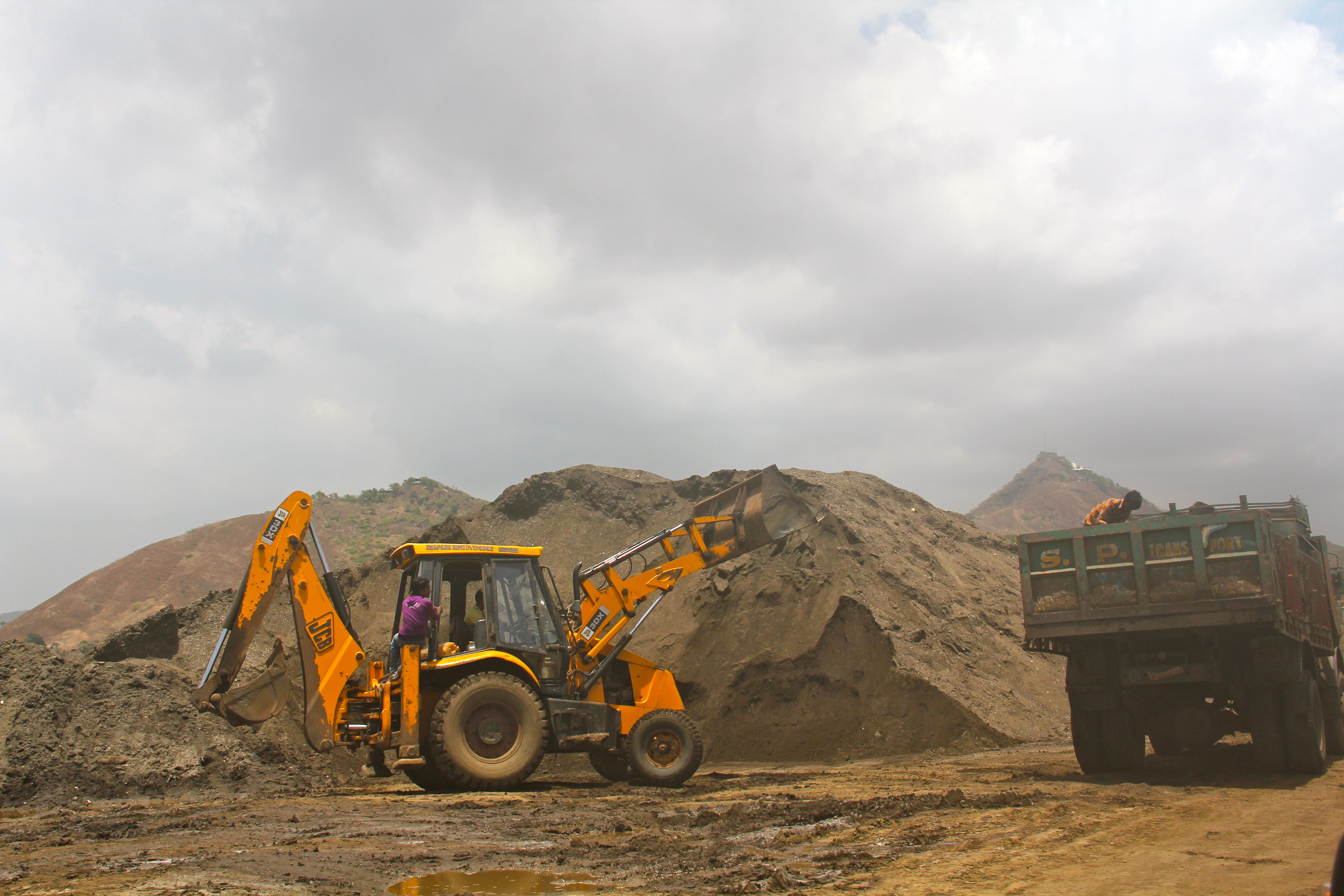
Illegal sandmining operation in India.

Kothari’s murder was connected to the local sand mining mafia as he was exposing their practices. Sand mining is an illegal process of removing sand and selling it as material to a construction company. Worldwide sand mining is a $70 billion industry. The activity is primarily a local operation that is set up close to construction work. India does not have enough legal sand to fill demand. However, the Indian Planning Commission estimates that sand mining constitutes almost 9 percent of the nation's GDP. While sand mining has a high profit margin for those who run it, it has environmental impacts and is therefore regulated. Sand mining companies, therefore have been known to rely on bribing government and law enforcement to work untouched. The mining mafias in India have been implicated in hundreds of deaths, including government officials, police officers, journalists, and citizens.

== Impact ==
Sandeep Kothari was targeted by the mining mafia because of his reports to expose the sand mafia and illegal mining activities. However, Kothari was not the only journalist to suffer this fate at the hands of the sand mafia. Weeks before Sandeep's murder, Jagendra Singh, a journalist from Shahjahanpur, Uttar Pradesh, was burned 1 June 2015 and he died from the attack on 8 June. And Haider Khan, a journalist from the same area as Singh, was beaten by the sand mining mafia.

== Reactions ==
Irina Bokova, director-general of UNESCO, has called for an investigation into the death of Sandeep Kothari and is urging authorities to bring the crime's perpetrators to trial.

The International Federation of Journalists (IFJ) said, "It is critical for the safety and independence of media in India that these incidents be investigated swiftly and transparently and with immediate steps taken to remedy the situation."

The Indian Journalists Union (IJU) and the Press Council of India (PCI) addressed the "intolerance" directed at Indian journalists that raises their security risks, and have called on the police departments of India to investigate Kothari's murder along with the other recent.

== See also ==
- Attacks on RTI activists in India
- List of journalists killed in India
- Mining scams in India
- Sumaira Abdulali, an environmental activist
