= Murder of Jagendra Singh =

2015 killing of a journalist in India by setting him on fire

Jagendra Singh
- Born: Shahjahanpur, Uttar Pradesh, India
- Died: Lucknow
- Occupation: Journalist

Murder of Jagendra Singh refers to the killing of a journalist in India by setting him on fire on 1 June 2015. Jagendra Singh was an Indian journalist from Shahjahanpur, Uttar Pradesh. He died on 8 June 2015 from burn injuries suffered a week earlier. He had been set on fire by local policemen and criminals on the directions of Uttar Pradesh Minister Rammurti Singh Verma. Singh had worked for Hindi-language media for 15 years.

== Background ==
Singh used to run a Facebook page called Shahjahanpur Samachar ("Shahjahanpur News"). Singh had written posts about Verma's alleged links to corruption and illegal mining. However, he did not provide evidence at the time specific to the allegations.

On 4 May 2015, Rammurti Verma and some of his henchmen had allegedly raped an Anganwadi female worker. She later told a local court that police were not filing a First Information Report (FIR) against Rammurti Verma. Jagendra Singh reported the story. Verma had claimed that it was a political ploy by his rivals and Singh to construct a fake case against him. On 22 May 2015, Singh wrote a post saying that he was being harassed by policemen, criminals and politicians, and that he feared that he might be killed by Verma.

== Attack ==
Shahjahanpur, where the attack took place, is located in India and shown here relative to the capital New Delhi.

On 1 June 2015, according to his family members, a group of policemen and goons came in two cars in the late afternoon and barged into his house in Shahjahanpur. Initially, they got into an argument with him, reminding him that he had been repeatedly told not to write anything against Verma. Then they pinned him down, poured petrol on him and set him on fire. He was taken to the district hospital in Shahjahanpur initially. Later, he was moved to King George's Medical University in Lucknow, where he died a week later.

At first, the Superintendent of Police of Shahjahanpur, Babloo Kumar, claimed that Singh was not a journalist, and stated he had committed suicide. The police also stated he had an ongoing investigation against him and that when the police had gone to arrest him, he had attempted suicide. They said they knocked on the door and waited. When they saw smoke coming out of a ventilation point, they entered and found Singh on fire. They claimed that they put out the fire and took him to the hospital. Later, the police said they were investigating the case.

== Death ==
In his dying declaration, Singh held Verma responsible for the attack and added that a previous attempt had been made on his life on 28 April 2015. He died of his injuries in a Lucknow hospital on 8 June. Soon afterwards, a video appeared on the internet which showed a badly burned Singh lying in his hospital bed talking to the camera. He could be heard saying, "Why did they have to burn me? If the ministers and his goondas had a grudge, they could have beaten me instead of pouring kerosene and burning me."

Following Singh's death, his son Raghvendra Singh filed a police case. An FIR was filed against minister Verma, a police inspector Prakash Rai of Kotwali police station and four others. They were charged under Sections 302 (murder), 120B (criminal conspiracy), 504 (intentional insult with intent to provoke breach of the peace) and 506 (criminal intimidation) of the Indian Penal Code.

== Investigation ==
On 13 June 2015, 5 policemen suspected to be involved in the case were suspended, among them was Sri Prakash Rai. On 24 June 2015, The Hindu newspaper reported that according to its sources the forensic report says that the burns were self-inflicted.

== Reactions ==
The Chairman of the Press Council of India, Chandramauli Kumar Prasad, on 10 June called it an attack on the freedom of press and asked the state government to form a Special Investigative Team (SIT) consisting of officers of good character to handle the case.

Amnesty International urged the Government of Uttar Pradesh to start an independent inquiry into the case.

On 12 June 2015, Ram Gopal Yadav, the General Secretary of Samajwadi Party to which the prime accused belonged, told media persons that Verma will not be removed from state cabinet. He said a FIR was not enough proof to take such action.

On 14 June 2015, the family members of the journalist started an indefinite dharna to demand for justice. They also told reporters that they were getting threats and were being offered hush money to withdraw the case. On 22 June 2015, Uttar Pradesh Chief Minister Akhilesh Yadav met the family and promised them an ex-gratia of ₹30 lakhs for the journalist's family. On 23 June, the family ended the dharna.

Forbidden Stories included Singh in Green Blood, a list of 13 reporters investigating environmental issues that have been killed between 2009 and 2019.

== See also ==
- List of journalists killed in India
- Mining scams in India
- Murder of Sandeep Kothari
- Sumaira Abdulali, an environmental activist
