= Soe Moe Tun =

Burmese investigative journalist

- Born: ca. 1981
- Died: December 13, 2016 (aged 34–35); Monywa, Sagaing Region, Myanmar
- Cause of death: Fractured skull from being beaten with a blunt object
- Body discovered: Pyidaungsu Road, Union Highway, near the Monywa Golf Course, Monywa
- Resting place: Sarkyin Cemetery, Monywa
- Occupation: Investigative journalist
- Years active: 2015-2016
- Employer: The Daily Eleven
- Known for: Investigative work on copper mining, illegal karaoke, illegal logging, and timber smuggling
- Spouse: Khin Cho Latt
- Children: 1
- Mother: Ye Ye Htay

Soe Moe Tun (ca. 1981 – 13 December 2016) was a Burmese investigative journalist for the Daily Eleven in Monywa, Sagaing Region, Myanmar (also known as Burma). He was best known for his investigative reporting about sensitive issues, such as illegal logging, the Letpadaung Copper Mine project, and illegal karaoke lounges in his local area. He was murdered in 2016 in Monywa, but the case has not been solved.

== Personal life ==
At the time of his murder, Soe Moe Tun was 35 years old. His mother, Ye Ye Htay, said that her son "was doing his work for the benefit of others." He was married to Khin Cho Latt, and the couple had an eight-year-old son. His wife and one of the locals stated that he had "no enemies" and testified to the genuine nature of his character.

His funeral services were held on 14 December 2016 at the Sarkyin Cemetery in Monywa, Sagaing Region.

== Career ==
Soe Moe Tun was a prolific reporter in Monywa who was employed by the Daily Eleven and the Eleven Media Group. He began working for the media company in January 2015 and continued reporting for them until his death in December 2016. His most notable investigative reports involved sensitive subjects, such as seizures of narcotic stimulants; the Chinese-funded Letpadaung Copper Mine project; illegal karaoke lounges, or KTV, which were being used as brothels; and illegal logging operations involving timber smuggling in the Sagaing region, the last of which many suspect could be related to his murder. The editor of Eleven Media said his most recent assignment involved illegal logging.

== Death ==
Location of Monywa relative to the capital Naypyidaw

Soe Moe Tun was found dead on 13 December 2016 at around 12:20 a.m. with injuries to his head, left eyebrow, and face near Pyidaungsu Road, Union Highway, close to the Monywa Golf Course in Aung Chanthar Ward in Monywa. The Sagaing Region police force formed a special team to investigate the crime scene and posted a sentry there to prevent any interference with the site. Soe Moe Tun was found face down. Roughly five feet away from him, various clues were found that implied that he had been murdered on site. Among these clues were a 1.22-meter-long stick, his bike helmet, and slippers. However, none of his personal belongings were taken. Police Captain Thein Swe Myint concluded that his murder was premeditated and very thoroughly planned. When the Criminal Investigation Department looked for forensic evidence, they discovered that the murderers destroyed their fingerprints on the stick. His phone contacts and calls were also analyzed.

In the aftermath of the murder, authorities suspected two people were involved and proceeded to question about 30–40 people, many of whom were staff members at a karaoke establishment called the Blue Sky KTV in Monywa, in order to narrow down suspects. This karaoke was one of the last places Soe Moe Tun visited on the day of his death. Finally, two people from the KTV were identified as suspects and arrested. Two weeks later, in January 2017, another person, who used to be a logging truck driver, was also arrested. However, those suspects were later released over lack of sufficient evidence to prosecute them. Much of the progress on the case was made within the first month and, in the midst of the investigation, the police chief of Monywa Central Police Station was moved to Rangoon. The case is still unsolved.

== Context ==
Soe Moe Tun was best known for reporting on serious, sensitive issues within his homeland such as illegal logging and timber smuggling. Myanmar’s forests are among the world's most diverse, and have been a target for loggers, often working illegally, since the late 1980s. The Sagaing Region is a well-known hub for illegal logging. These activities are so frequent that even some local citizens within the town seem to have investments in the logging trade, making it harder to police.

The Myanmar Journalist Network issued a statement after Soe Moe Tun's murder that fellow journalist Tin Zaw Oo, who was reporting on illegal logging in the Mandalay region, had been threatened. In project Green Blood Forbidden Stories recognized Sun Moe Tun as 1 of 13 reporters killed while investigating environmental issues between 2009 and 2019.

Since 1999, Myanmar has seen five journalism-related killings, including that of Soe Moe Tun, according to Reporters Without Borders and the Committee to Protect Journalists.

== See also ==
- Censorship in Myanmar
- List of unsolved murders (2000–present)
- Media of Myanmar
