= Edwin Rivera Paz =

Honduran journalist (ca. 1989–2017)

- Born: ca. 1989; Veracruz, Mexico
- Died: July 9, 2017 (aged 28); Acayucan, Veracruz, Mexico
- Cause of death: Shooting
- Occupations: Cameraman, video journalist
- Years active: 2010–2017
- Employer: Hable Como Habla (HCH)
- Known for: Main cameraman for "Los Verduleros"
- Relatives: Pablo Rivera Cabrera

Edwin Rivera Paz, (ca. 1989 – July 9, 2017), was a Honduran journalist living in southern Veracruz, Mexico, who worked as the lead cameraman for the Honduran television program "Los Verduleros" on Hable Como Habla, who died in Acayucan, Veracruz, from multiple gunshot wounds from two unidentified assailants on a motorcycle with no known motives in broad daylight. Rivera received several death threats in his home country not long before he was murdered.

== Life and career ==
Edwin Rivera Paz lived with his half-brother, Pablo Rivera Cabrera, in the San Diego neighborhood, near Mexican Federal Highway 185 that connects Minatitlán and Coatzacoalcos. At the time of his murder, Rivera resided in southern Veracruz seeking political asylum out of fear for his life.

Rivera and his colleague Igor Padilla worked together on the comedy program Los Verduleros at the television station Hable Como Habla (HCH). While Rivera lived in Acayucan, he worked on an independent project about the challenges Central American migrants and refugees faced in Mexico, which included organized crime group violence; Rivera was making photo and video reports about the lives of other refugees in the city.

== Death ==
Acayucan is in Mexico and shown relative to the capital Mexico City.

In late January 2017, Rivera fled Honduras for Acayucan after his colleague, Padilla, was murdered in San Pedro Sula. While in Acayucan, two unidentified assailants on a motorcycle chased Rivera for several blocks, beat and then repeatedly shot him on the afternoon of July 9, 2017, at approximately 2 in the afternoon. Rivera's half-brother identified his body after the attack. At the time of Rivera's murder, he had been living in southern Veracruz for several months, seeking political asylum to the Mexican Aid Commission To Refugees (COMAR).

== Context ==
Igor Padilla, a colleague of Rivera's, was shot in January by four men wearing police uniforms in the northern Honduras city of San Pedro Sula. The men who murdered Padilla are suspected members of Mara 18. Padilla had covered crime and also hosted the humorous television show "Los Verduleros", which Rivera was the cameraman for. Soon after Padilla's murder, Rivera fled his home country for Acayucan in fear for his life. It is not immediately clear exactly how long Rivera had been in Acayucan before his death; the town lies on a heavily used route for migrants fleeing violence who are preyed on by organized crime groups.

Paz was the seventh journalist killed this year in Mexico, where more than 100 reporters have been murdered since 2000. More journalists have been murdered in Veracruz than the rest of Mexico; it is now the deadliest region for media in the Western hemisphere. The situation is almost as dangerous as Rivera's native Honduras, where 69 journalists have been killed since 2003.

== Reactions ==
The Honduran consul in Mexico asks the state prosecutor to investigate and to not let the crime go unpunished.

Ricardo Sánchez Pérez del Pozo, the Federal Special Prosecutor for Attention to Crimes against Freedom of Expression, expressed that his office had opened a case file for the murder to determine whether it was related to the victim's work as a journalist.

Jorge Morales Vázquez, executive secretary of the Veracruz State Commission for the Care and Protection of Journalists, said the commission was investigating Rivera's reporting as a possible motive but could not provide additional information.

Raul Otoniel Morazan, Honduras' consul general in Veracruz, called in an interview for all levels of the Mexican government to get to the bottom of the killing.

Julian Hernandez, a spokesman for the Honduran police, said, "We are seeking more information about this crime in Mexico to determine if it is related to the murder of Igor Padilla and to see if any criminal gangs from Honduras were involved."

The Mesoamerican Migrant Movement said the circumstances of the death were "worrying" and called on authorities to investigate the case.

Director-General of the UN Educational, Scientific and Cultural Organization (UNESCO), Irina Bokova, said, "I call for a thorough investigation into this crime. Freedom of expression and freedom of information in the region will remain threatened as long as impunity is allowed to prevail for crimes against journalists and media workers."

== See also ==
- List of journalists and media workers killed in Mexico
- List of journalists killed in 2017
