= Wisut Tangwittayaporn =

Thai journalist and political activist

- Born: c. 1968
- Died: January 12, 2012 (aged 43–44); Phuket, Thailand
- Other names: Ae Inside
- Occupations: Journalist; editor; publisher
- Employers: Owner of Inside Phuket; Editor of Phuket E-News
- Movement: United Front for Democracy Against Dictatorship
- Spouse: Jiraporn Hosakul

Wisut Tangwittayaporn, also known as Ae Inside, (c. 1968 – 12 January 2012) was a journalist, editor for Phuket E-News and publisher of Inside Phuket in Phuket, Thailand. He was most notable for being a journalist who reported on controversial land claims, as well as being a political activist. He was assassinated by professional gunmen in rush hour traffic on 12 January 2012.

== Personal ==
Wisut Tangwittayaporn was married to Jiraporn Hosakul. He was cremated at the Kajonrangsan Temple in Phuket Town. A billboard outside of the crematorium read, "The fearless reporter who never feared death – Ae Inside".

== Career ==
Wisut Tangwittayaporn was a journalist. He owned the newspaper Inside Phuket and he edited Phuket E-News. Wisut covered some controversial stories, including land claims in Freedom Beach and other areas in Phuket and an exposé on illegalities within the system of the transfer and promotion of government officers.

Wisut was also the secretary of the Red Shirt political group, a group that opposed the military coup that overthrew Prime Minister Thaksin Shinawatra. Wisut also led a local community group that opposed the private use of Freedom Beach.

== Death ==
Phuket is located in Thailand and is shown relative to the capital city Bangkok.

Wisut was killed on 12 January 2012 by two gunmen on a motorcycle. He had been under observation by his killers for two months. Wisut and his wife were in a black Honda Jazz on Thepkasattri Road in Phuket when gunmen pulled their motorcycle in front of his car and shot him three times with four shots fired before making their getaway. The crime was captured by surveillance video. Wisut died in Vachira Phuket Hospital. Wisut's wife, Jiraporn "Ji" Hosakul, survived the attack unharmed and was able to describe the gunmen and vehicle to police. There were also other witnesses at the scene.

Noppadol "Pae" Praisri was arrested and confessed to being the driver of the motorcycle. He said he was paid 50,000 baht. He also accused Sanya "Noo" Klinchum of being the gunman. Noppadol reenacted the crime for the police and images of his demonstration appeared in the media. Sanya "Noo" Klinchum was arrested as the gunman. Noppadol implicated Somkuan "Mr. Boy" Deepan as the person who arranged the shooting and paid for it but Somkuan remains uncaught today.

The main suspect for ordering the murder was Ausadakorn "Pord" Sidorkbaow, the director of KPP Cable TV and deputy director of the Phuket's Chamber of Commerce. Ausadakorn was allegedly friends with Somkuan, or "Mr. Boy", and he was mentioned in a column written by Wisut. For his part Ausadakorn said Somokuan had been a worker at one of his construction sites and that he was friends with Wisut. Without the confession of Somkuan, he was granted bail, he denied any involvement, and he was never convicted.

== Context ==
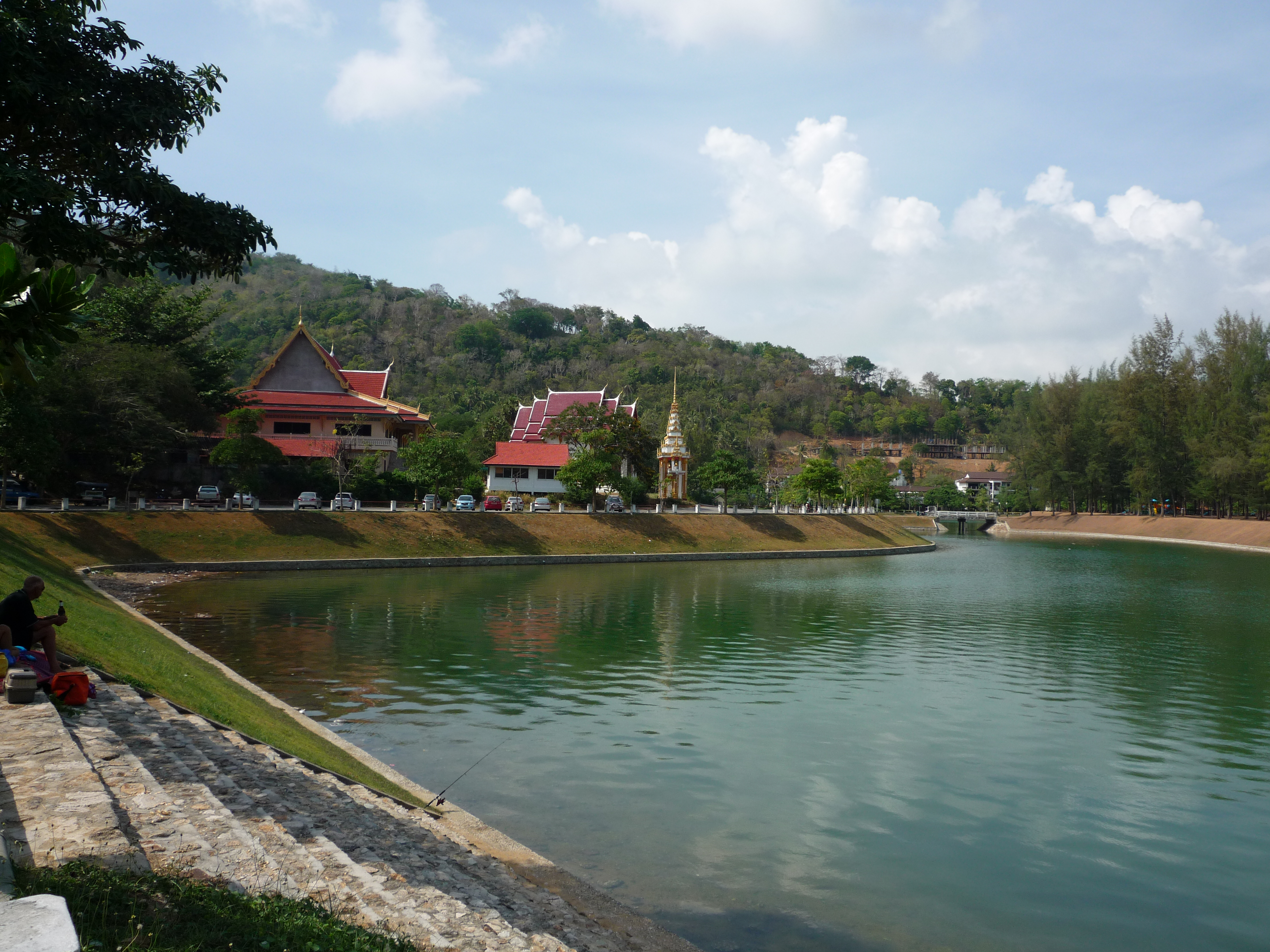
An image of Wat Ban Ko Si-Li (วัดบ้านเกาะสิเหร่) with temple in the background.

At the time of Wisut's death, Thailand lacked freedom of speech as several journalists were imprisoned for insulting the monarchy. There were several other murders related to the real estate industry in the province around the time of Wisut's death as well. Forbidden Stories named Wisut Tangwittayaporn as 1 of 13 reporters investigating environmental issues that were killed between 2009 and 2019.

== Impact ==
After Wisut's death, Pheu Thai Party officials investigated the land at Freedom Beach, which is associated with his reporting and political activity.

== Reactions ==
The murder of Wisut Tangwittayaporn was condemned by the UNESCO Director-General Irina Bokova, who called for an investigation and labeled it violation of the human right of expression. The statement read: "Media professionals and owners must be allowed to carry out their work freely and without fear. Only under such conditions can the media fulfill its responsibilities, contributing to democracy and good governance. This brutal killing must be investigated and its perpetrators be brought to trial in the interest of press freedom and the fundamental human right of freedom of expression."

Thida Thavornseth, leader of the Red Shirts, said, "Mr Ae was a very brave man. First, because he was fearless in his reporting. Second, because he was openly a red shirt supporter, which is rare in the South – this is not a ‘red-shirt’ area. To do what he did was very dangerous. Some people in Thailand still solve problems in barbaric ways. This is an indicator of an undeveloped country. I want to pass this message on to all people in the media: to report all facts truly and accurately without fear. Those who think differently than those around them, should be able to walk freely through society without fear of repercussions."

Phuket's Governor Tri Augkaradacha took personal interest in the investigation. The investigation was given high priority by the local police force with at least 5 teams of police officers involved in the case.
