= Team Jorge =

Israeli cyber-espionage and disinformation firm

- Formation: c. 2015
- Founder: Tal Hanan
- Type: Private cyber-espionage and disinformation firm
- Headquarters: Israel
- Products: Advanced Impact Media Solutions (Aims)
- Services: Election interference, hacking, disinformation campaigns
- Key people: Tal Hanan ("Jorge")

Team Jorge is the name given to an outfit of Israeli contractors specialized in the use of malign cyber activities including hacking, sabotage, and bot farm-run social media disinformation campaigns to manipulate the outcomes of elections. One of the organization's primary tools is a software package called Advanced Impact Media Solutions, or Aims.

The group was exposed in February 2023 after an award-winning undercover operation by journalists from Israel and France as part of a consortium of investigative journalists coordinated by Forbidden Stories. The organization has been active since at least 2015 and boasts of having manipulated 33 presidential elections worldwide, many of them in Africa, and in 27 cases with successful results.

Their activities were revealed following a 2022 sting operation in Tel Aviv, carried out by three undercover journalists, who posed as prospective clients and filmed their interactions with Tal Hanan – the group's leader and former Israeli special forces operative – in which he explained the inner workings of the organization. Tal Hanan used the pseudonym "Jorge" when working with the hacking and disinformation group, which inspired the Team Jorge name.

== Background ==
According to Tal Hanan, the group's leader, Team Jorge has existed for more than two decades and has been engaged in propaganda and disinformation activities in more than 30 countries. However, its first documented activity dates to 2015. Their services have been available to government intelligence agencies, political campaigns, and private companies that wished to covertly manipulate public opinion.

One of the organization's primary tools is a software package called Advanced Impact Media Solutions, or Aims. The software automates centralized control of thousands of fake social media profiles on Twitter, LinkedIn, Facebook, Telegram, TikTok and others. A number of these profiles also have Amazon and Airbnb accounts, along with credit cards and Bitcoin wallets. The group also employs hacking techniques to brute force accounts of potential victims.

== Investigation and exposure ==
Team Jorge's activities were revealed after a sting operation by three undercover journalists, Gur Megiddo of TheMarker, Frédéric Métézeau of Radio France and Omer Benjakob of Haaretz, posing as prospective clients filmed interactions with Tal Hanan in Tel Aviv in 2022 in which he explained the inner workings of the organization. To test Team Jorge's abilities, the journalists tasked it with a disinformation campaign called #RIP_Emmanuel, spreading a death hoax about social media personality Emmanuel the emu. The hashtag was used in over 1,300 tweets, and a tweet from Emmanuel's owner saying he was not dead received millions of views. In the conversations, Hanan boasted of having interfered in 33 presidential-level campaigns, 27 of which had positive results for the faction that hired them.

Hanan claimed responsibility for a 2019 cyberattack against the central elections committee of Indonesia made to look like it had come from China for political reasons. Media outlets including Bloomberg reported on the attack in March 2019, noting the probable "Chinese-Russian" origin of the interference, while an investigation by The Guardian noted that it was more likely the work of other hackers leaving a false trail.

He also claimed that Team Jorge interfered in the 2014 Catalan independence referendum, hacked the emails of the chief-of-staff of Trinidad and Tobago and leaked a document to cause a political crisis, passed false information to an ABC journalist to influence the 2012 Venezuelan presidential election against former president Hugo Chávez, ran a 2022 campaign claiming the Polisario Front has ties to Hezbollah and Iran, and another 2022 campaign defaming Ali bin Fetais Al-Marri, the UN envoy for combating corruption.

The wider investigation involved journalists from a total 30 outlets, coordinated by Forbidden Stories, and included The Guardian, Der Spiegel, Die Zeit, Le Monde, the Organized Crime and Corruption Reporting Project (OCCRP), El País, and other media organizations in France, Germany, Indonesia, Israel, Kenya, Spain, Tanzania, and the United States. The global investigation, dubbed Story Killers, was awarded the 2023 Excellence in Collaboration and Partnerships prize by the Online News Association (ONA).

Hanan attended meetings involving Cambridge Analytica as early as 2014. Emails leaked to The Guardian show that Team Jorge was then in contact with Cambridge Analytica in 2015 and 2017 over political campaigns in Africa and South America. The two organizations worked to manipulate the 2015 Nigerian election. The plan was to help get Goodluck Jonathan re-elected by discrediting Muhammadu Buhari, but the campaign was unsuccessful.

During the undercover meeting with journalists in 2022, Hanan showcased his ability to hack into the Telegram account of Dennis Itumbi, a digital strategist for William Ruto during the 2022 Kenyan general election. Itumbi subsequently confirmed to The Star that his Telegram account had been infiltrated, and that he noticed "increased activity" in the run-up to the election.

== Reactions ==
Métézeau of Radio France and Le Monde found that Team Jorge created various segments that Rachid M'Barki, a French television presenter for BFM TV, had broadcast without editor approval, possibly on behalf of foreign governments. He was suspended in January 2023, during an inquiry by international investigative reporting teams. It was suggested to undercover reporters by a member of Team Jorge that the group was behind a BFM TV news report that discussed the effect of sanctions against Russian oligarchs on Monaco's luxury yacht industry. It was claimed that 10,000 jobs were at risk, but this was without basis. It was one of several reports aired late at night by M'Barki without the knowledge of the editorial team, planted by Team Jorge as "news for hire" and subsequently picked up on social media by the team's bots.

On 16 February, India's Congress Party demanded a probe into the possible involvement or interference of Team Jorge in Indian elections. Congress spokesperson Pawan Khera and former journalist and now Congress social media head Supriya Shrinate linked the revelations about possible interference in India with a wider pattern of online disinformation and democratic and electoral abuse in the country.

== See also ==
- Black Cube
- Internet Research Agency
- NSO Group
