= Irfan Hussain =

Indian cartoonist (1964–1999)

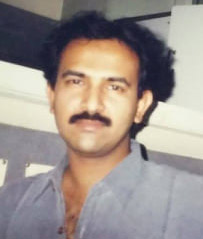
- Born: 29 January 1964; Nagpur
- Died: 13 March 1999 (aged 35); Sahibabad, Uttar Pradesh, India
- Occupations: Cartoonist, illustrator
- Spouse: Munira (1991-1999)

Irfan Hussain was a senior cartoonist for the Indian magazine, Outlook, who was kidnapped and murdered in 1999. There have been no convictions in the case so far.

In his short career he worked for The Hitavada, Hindustan Times and The Pioneer (India).

== Kidnapping and murder ==
Location of Gazipur in Delhi, where Hussain's body was found

On 8 March 1999, after spending an evening at the Delhi Press Club at Irfan_Hussain.jpg, Irfan Hussain called his wife to tell her that he would reach home in 15 minutes. He dropped off a colleague at Laxmibai Nagar. Then he went missing on the way to his home in Sahibabad. On 9 March, his wife, Munira Hussain, filed a missing person report. After three days, Paresh Nath, a cartoonist at The National Herald, received an anonymous phone call from someone claiming to be from the Shiv Sena, saying that Hussain had already been murdered; and that he and another Delhi cartoonist, Sudhir Tailang, would also be killed soon. Shiv Sena, a right-wing, Hindu ultranationalist party, denied its involvement.

Irfan Hussain's body was discovered on 13 March 1999 in a field in Ghazipur in east Delhi near National Highway 24. By this time, Hussain had been missing for five days. He had been found strangled, his throat was slit, he had 28 stab wounds and his hands and feet were bound, indicating he was tortured. A colleague asked to identify the body could only do so by his shoes, due to the body's disfigurement. His car could not be located for several months and his cellphone was never found.

=== Investigation and arrests ===
Sites where the body, bag and the car were found

In late March 1999, police claimed to have recovered a bag belonging to Hussain from Panipat. On 5 December 1999, the missing car's stereo was found from a dealer. The car was recovered in Anantnag. On 14 December, the police arrested five accused from a metropolitan court, where they were under trial for auto theft.

=== Trial ===
On 8 February 2001, the charges were filed against the five for kidnapping with the intent to murder, murder and group liability. On 1 June 2001, a sixth accused, a juvenile, was arrested. On 23 July 2001, the Additional Sessions Judge court began hearing the evidence of the prosecution.

On 12 September 2005, the juvenile accused petitioned the court for his case to be transferred to a juvenile court, and on 19 September his petition was granted.

On 3 January 2006, the court finished the prosecution's case and about 60 witnesses' statements were recorded. On 30 January, the court began hearing the accused's case where they pleaded innocence. The final arguments began on 4 February, and concluded on 27 February.

On 28 February, the Additional Sessions Judge Talwant Singh acquitted the accused, stating that the evidence against them was circumstantial and they could not be linked to the crimes. On 31 March, the written order was given.

=== Aftermath ===
The prosecution decided not to challenge the verdict. Hussain's father, Mansoor Bhai, gave permission to the Outlook magazine editor, Vinod Mehta, to file an appeal in the Delhi High Court. On 7 April 2006, Mehta said that the magazine's lawyers would file an appeal for a re-investigation.

== See also ==
- List of journalists killed in India
