= Tal Hanan =

Israeli businessman

- טל חנן
- Born: 1973 (age 52–53); Israel
- Occupations: Special forces operator, businessman
- Known for: Team Jorge disinformation unit

Tal Hanan (Hebrew: טל חנן; born in 1973), also known by his code name Jorge, is an Israeli businessman and former special forces operator who has been involved in disinformation campaigns in order to manipulate elections in several countries. Hanan's organisation Team Jorge has, for instance, attempted to influence the 2015 Nigerian general election in collaboration with Cambridge Analytica.

The group operate a software called AIMS for creating fake online accounts on social media networks and using them to spread fake news.

Tal Hanan's operation was the subject of an undercover investigation conducted by journalists from TheMarker, Radio France, and Haaretz in Israel working together with the journalism organization Forbidden Stories. It was then jointly reported in The Guardian, Le Monde, Haaretz, Der Spiegel and others in February 2023. Hanan has denied any wrongdoing.

== See also ==
- Troll farm, company who creates fake accounts and uses them to influence the political landscape of a country
