= Murder of Rajdev Ranjan =

2016 murder incident in Bihar, India

Rajdev Ranjan
- Born: ca. 1971
- Died: May 13, 2016; Siwan, Bihar, India
- Cause of death: Gunshot to the head between the eyes, and shot in the neck
- Body discovered: near his office and Station Road in the Siwan market area
- Other name: Rajdeo Ranjan
- Occupations: Journalist and bureau chief
- Years active: 1994-2016
- Employer: Hindustan Daily
- Known for: frequently writing against Shahabuddin, former RJD MP, who was serving life imprisonment for the murder of two brothers
- Spouse: Asha Devi
- Children: 2 (1 son and 1 daughter)

Rajdev Ranjan, also known as Rajdeo Ranjan (c. 1971 – May 13, 2016), who was an Indian journalist for the Hindustan Daily in Siwan, Bihar, India, was killed in a drive-by shooting. His death received significant media coverage and was seen as a threat to journalism and freedom of expression in India. He is known to have been writing against Mohammad Shahabuddin, a former Rashtriya Janata Dal MP, who was serving a life sentence in connection with the murder of two brothers. Five contract killers were arrested, during the same month of Ranjan's murder, on May 25, 2016.

== Personal ==
Rajdev Ranjan was 45-year-old at the time of his death. He had a law degree, in addition to his post-graduate degree.

Ranjan was married to Asha Devi, a teacher, and he was murdered on May 13, 2016, the day before his wedding anniversary. He and his wife had two school-aged children, a boy and a girl. Ranjan had lived with his family at Mahadev Mission compound in Siwan. His remains were cremated.

== Career ==
Rajdev Ranjan started his career as a stringer from Siwan when he started at the Hindustan Daily in 1994. For over 24 years, Rajdev Ranjan had been an active journalist for the Hindi-language Hindustan Daily. As a journalist, his main focus had been reporting on politics and crime. Ranjan worked as a staff member before he was promoted to the bureau chief position, a position which he held for about seven years until his murder. As bureau chief, he was in charge of a group of six journalists. The Hindustan Daily is a branch of the Hindustan Times Media company.

Ranjan had reported against former RJD MP Mohammad Shahabuddin at least 4 times. One month before his murder, Ranjan reported on state politician Abdul Ghafoor's meeting and meal shared with imprisoned Shahabuddin inside the Siwan prison. Ranjan's name also appeared on a hit list that is claimed by Ranjan's wife to be made by Shahabuddin himself.

== Death ==
Siwan within India relative to the capital New Delhi.

Rajdev Ranjan was by Siwan railway station on his way to his office from gathering news when he was murdered by attackers on bikes. Ranjan received gunshot wounds to the neck and head, both at close-range. He had first been shot between the eyes and in the neck. The shooting occurred at approximately 8 p.m. in the Siwan market area. Ranjan died later at a hospital.

Ranjan's killers may be members of a gang in Siwan. Ranjan's family met with local Bharatiya Janata Party MP Om Prakash Yadav, who said, "I am absolutely sure that Shahabuddin is behind Rajdev's killing." Ranjan had been threatened before and once had been held at gunpoint, according to several of his fellow journalists. Convicted murderer Mohammed Shahabuddin allegedly had made a hit list and Ranjan's name was seventh on that list. According to Ranjan's wife, he was aware of such a list and told her about people on the list who had been killed before his name.

=== Investigation ===
The Siwan police started the investigation. They brought several items to Siwan forensic scientists to examine, such as "a 7.65 mm pistol with two cartridges and three motorcycles allegedly used by the assailants." Ranjan's assailants are believed by investigators to have been hired by Laddan Mian (or Miyan), Shahabuddin's aide, which could link Shahabuddin to the crime, but he was released after 14 days of questioning. Police held three people for questioning about the murder of Rajdev Ranjan, who all said they were disturbed by what Ranjan had been reporting. The alleged shooters mentioned Shahabuddin's name multiple times during questioning about who the leader was in this attack. Authorities have been attempting to find evidence from Ranjan's cell phone and CCTV footage that may shed light on the murder.

The Central Bureau of Investigation (CBI) started a case on Ranjan's murder. They continued the investigation that the police of Siwan had started in which it became apparent that the murder had been planned out. The CBI team consisted of three inspectors, two deputy superintendents of police, and five sub-inspectors.

During the investigation, Shahabuddin was released from prison. He was seen with a man by the name of Mohammad Kaif. Kaif has been running from the law since his part in the murder of three brothers. In addition, Kaif was wanted for Ranjan's murder, and photographs of him with Shahabuddin have caused Asha Devi, Ranjan's widow, and Ranjan's co-workers to question if there had been an arrangement between the two for Ranjan's death. Mohammad Kaif, who police say is a prime suspect in the murder, surrendered and was taken into custody.

Two other people have recently been brought to light as connected with Ranjan's murderer. Shahabuddin and several other important leaders have been spotted with several of the people accused of murdering Ranjan, including Mohammad Kaif and Mohammad Javed. Mohammad Javed has still not been found.

In the CBI investigation of the crime scene and discussion with the Siwan police, who originally had been handling the case, there have been six suspects allegedly involved in the murder of Rajdev Ranjan. The list of suspects include Azaharuddin Beig, Rohit Kumr Soni, Vijay Kumar Gupta, Rajesh Kumar, Sonu Kumar Gupta, and Rishu Kumar Jaiswal. The apex court is not allowing bail for the six people suspected in Ranjan's murder. The bail is not currently being allowed because the investigation is still underway by the CBI. Shahabuddin is claims the men were not accused until later after which he had already met them.

The CBI had asked for six months to investigate the murder but was only granted three months to do so by the apex court.

== Context ==
Ranjan was allegedly targeted "as a result of having published several articles in the Hindustan Daily concerning the questionable actions of Shahabuddin." Ranjan's most recent work published against Shahabuddin had been a photograph of Shahabuddin in jail where he is being held, eating with the Bihar Minister Abdul Gafoor. Angered by Ranjan's work, Shahabuddin supposedly placed Ranjan's name as seventh on his hit list. Shahabuddin is thought to have then "hired five people to murder Ranjan." The shooting took place under the Town police station in Dakshin Tola, where four gunshots were heard. There are journalist friends of Ranjan's who said "someone had held Ranjan at gunpoint to threaten him about ten years ago." Asha Devi, Ranjan's widow, believes that Ranjan had been a target of Shahabuddin's for his work a while before he was murdered. A colleague of Ranjan's said that Ranjan "had received a phone call that evening and had left in a hurry," something "uncharacteristic of Ranjan" according to the source. This is not the first in a string of murders and attempted murders committed by people connected to Shahabuddin; there had been other names on Shahabuddin's hit list, one of which, Rajeev Roshan, had been murdered as well in 2014. Ranjan had written an article about Chawanni Singh, Shahabuddin's sharp shooter, and about how police were making progress in a murder case involving Singh. He had written the article just before his murder. Back in 2014, police had discovered that Shahabuddin had made a hit list contain twenty-three names. According to police, it was evident that "the list was made in order of who was a priority to kill first." Ranjan's coworkers at the Hindustan have said that Ranjan had "received previous threats from people working for Shahabuddin, and he is not the only one to have gotten them." Ranjan's wife said that Ranjan had even once "received a threat that his office would be burned down."

== Impact ==
One day before Ranjan's murder, another journalist, Indradeo Yadav, was shot in Chatra district, Jharkhand.

While those two murders were being investigated, the Press Council of India advocated for a law that would guide the investigations into the murder of journalists across the country. A statement was issued by the organization's chief who was Supreme Court judge: "It is a matter of grave concern that three journalists were killed in the country in the last four months and another died in a tragic accident while on the line of duty. I urge upon the Government of India to enact a special law for protection of journalists and speedy trial of cases of attacks and assaults them in special fast track courts as recommended by the Sub-Committee for Safety of Journalists appointed by the Press Council.

== Reactions ==
Irina Bokova, director-general of UNESCO, said, "I condemn the murder of Rajdev Ranjan. I call on the authorities to investigate these killings to prevent impunity for all crimes against freedom of expression and freedom of information from taking root."

There has been a call for justice against Ranjan's murderers by the journalists of Siwan.

The Bihar government had attempted to make a move to prevent Shahabuddin from being released from jail, but it was not successful even though they had said they had their finest lawyers on the job. Because of this, the government has been heavily criticized lately by a large number of siwan citizens. People became increasingly disturbed when two leaders, Shahabuddin and Bihar Health Minister Tej pratapYadav, were spotted with two of Ranjan's supposed killers.

Rajdev Ranjan's wife Asha Devi said that officials are not doing enough in the investigation out of fear of Shahabuddin. Asha Devi has been working to get the case transferred from Siwan to Delhi in hopes of it being better managed. In response to the photographs of Shahabuddin with Kaif, Devi said, "How is it that the police did not know where the culprits were? Strict action should be taken against them. Nitish Kumar did not take cognizance of the matter, that is why I had to go to Delhi. He should correct his mistake and he should make proceedings against these culprits. CBI should take the murder probe, until then the truth will not come out."

Ranjan's family was visited by Prem Kumar, leader of the opposition Bharatiya Janata Party. Many leaders have shown their distress concerning the murder of Rajdev Ranjan, several of which were seen at the gathering offering condolences to Ranjan's family, including other BJP politicians Mangal Pandey and Sushil Kumar Modi. Assistant director general Sunil Kumar is quoted to have said, "Criminals involved in the murder will not be spared no matter how powerful they are."

== See also ==
- List of journalists killed in India
