= Sai Reddy =

Indian journalist

- Born: ca. 1962
- Died: 6 December 2013; Basaguda market, Bijapur district, Chhattisgarh
- Cause of death: Stabbing and beating
- Occupation: Journalist
- Years active: 20 years
- Employer: Deshbandhu (Hindi-language newspaper)
- Known for: His reporting in the Bijapur district on the conflict between Maoists and security forces
- Criminal charges: Reddy was held by security in 1998 under the Essential Commodities Act and again in 2008 for suspected relationships with the Maoists.

Sai Reddy (ca. 1962 – 6 December 2013) was an Indian journalist for the Hindi-language newspaper Deshandhu. He was murdered by the Maoists near a market in Basaguda, Bijapur district, Chhattisgarh. Both the Maoists and police were suspicious of Reddy's allegiance to the other side. Maoists believed he was assisting police to dislodge the Communist Party of India. The police arrested him for having close ties with the communists. Some journalists believed that Reddy was killed by other farmers. He had been known for playing an active role in the people's movement in Basaguda over the last few decades.

== Personal ==
Sai Reddy was born in 1962 and was from Basuguda, an area hit hard by the insurgent Naxalites. Reddy was held by the security forces in 1998 under the Essential Commodities Act and again in 2008 for suspected relationships with the Maoists. Many rural journalists supplement their incomes by selling agricultural products while also working as journalists, and Reddy also used this method to supplement his salary. His wife had a shop. He was living in Bijapur at the time he returned home.

== Career ==
Sai Reddy was a rural journalist. He reported on rural topics, as well as on corruption cases. He had at least 20 years of experience and covered the conflict with the Maoists for that long. He was known by peers and employer as independent and critical of all sides and careful to check on facts and figures while reporting.

Reddy's writings on the Naxal violence in the region gained him unwanted attention, and he was known to have angered the security forces, the anti-Maoist group Salwa Judum, and the Maoists. Tribal families in the Chhattisgarh area were subjected to violence during the insurgent conflict with the Indian authorities. Reddy was held by security in 1998 under the Essential Commodities Act and again in 2008 for suspected relationships with the Maoists. Around 2008, Reddy fled Chhattisgarh after his house was destroyed by fire and the police had arrested him, and returned later after apologising to the Moaists.

== Death ==
Location of Basaguda in India, where Reddy was murdered shown relative to the capital New Delhi.

Sai Reddy was murdered by 4 or more men after leaving the market in Basguda on 6 December 2013. The cause of death was from head and neck injuries that were caused by stabbing and beating. The attack occurred during the afternoon in front of witnesses. The attackers used sharp-edged weapons on Reddy when they attacked him, and he died en route to the hospital. Reddy had been receiving threats from the Maoists for some time. The Maoists officially took responsibility more than a month after the Reddy's murder. His troubles with the Maoists went back as far as 2008 when they torched his house.

== Context ==
By the time Maoists killed Sai Reddy, over 1500 civilians in the area had been killed by the armed political group.

Sai Reddy was one of at least eight Indian journalists who were killed during 2013. The level of violence against journalists in 2013 in India surpassed the previous high level of violence reached in 1997 when seven were killed. Nemi Chand Jain was also killed in Chhattisgarh in February 2013. According to news reports, Jain was killed by the Maoists and the group confirmed it, which makes Reddy the second journalist killed by the Maoist in 2013. He was one of 70 journalists killed worldwide in 2013. Forbidden Stories named Sai Reddy as 1 of 13 reporters investigating environmental issues that were killed between 2009 and 2019.

== Reaction ==
Within 45 days of Reddy's murder, the Maoists not only took responsibility for his murder but said they were mistaken about his working for the police.

After his killing outside the market in front of eyewitnesses, police suspected Maoists and that was confirmed by a press release released after the attack. Journalists in Basaguda marched through the lands of the Maoists over a three-day period to protest his death and out of concern for their own safety.

The Indian Journalists Union called for arrests. The president and secretary of Journalists' Forum Assam (JFA) called Reddy's murderers "cowards" and threw their support behind the journalists of the Chattishgrah who demonstrating against Reddy's murder. The JFA, which has also experienced problems in Assam supported the principle of neutrality of journalists between political and security forces

Irina Bokova, the director general of UNESCO, also responded to Reddy's murder, "I urge the authorities to investigate this crime. Violence against media workers undermines the ability of journalists to carry out their work freely as well as the right of citizens to receive the independent information they need."

The Committee to Protect Journalists requested that India investigate his murder and a spokesperson said, "Journalists in Chhattisgarh have become targets in the conflict between the Indian state and the Maoists for simply reporting the realities on the ground."

== See also ==
- List of journalists killed in India
