= Laurent Richard =

French journalist

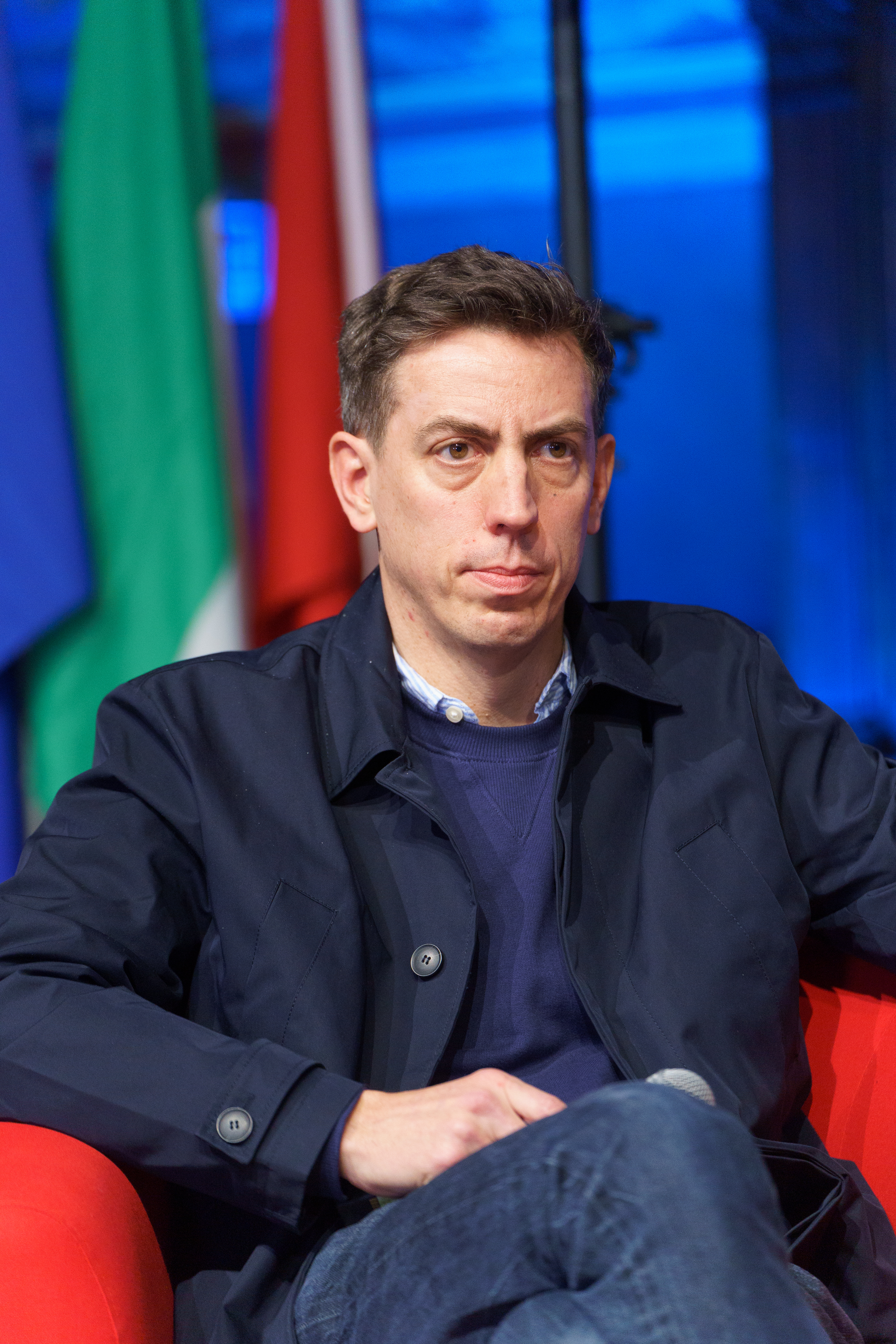
- Richard at the International Journalism Festival in 2024
- Occupations: Journalist; Documentary filmmaker; Television producer
- Years active: 2004–present
- Organization: Forbidden Stories
- Television: Cash Investigation

Laurent Richard is a French journalist, documentary filmmaker and producer. He is the founder of Forbidden Stories. He was awarded the European Journalist of the Year by Prix Europa. He is a Pulitzer Center on Crisis Reporting grantee.
