= Efigenia Vásquez Astudillo =

Colombian reporter and journalist

María Efigenia Vásquez Astudillo (approx. 1986 – October 8, 2017) was a reporter and host for Renacer Kokonuko 90.7 FM radio station in Colombia, as well as a communicator for the Colombian indigenous people of Kokonuko.

== Biography ==
Efigenia Vásquez Astudillo was an indigenous leader of the Kokonuko people, which allied with Páez people also known as the Nasa people, located in the municipality of Puracé, Cauca Department, southwest of Colombia. She was part of the Indigenous Guard of her community for three years. Efigenia worked voluntarily in the indigenous Renacer Kokonuco radio, linked to the Regional Indigenous Council of Cauca that was a branch of the National Indigenous Organization of Colombia (Spanish: Organización Nacional Indígena de Colombia or ONIC).

Efigenia was interested in communication processes within the indigenous community from an early age. This interest led her to participate in journalist meetings and "own communication" seminars at departmental and national levels. With the passage of time, she joined the Renacer Kokonuko radio station for indigenous Kokonuko people, in which she managed several programs such as the Indigenous Dawn and Minga (Minga is a Colombian indigenous word that means a tradition and movement when people gather to protest or work).

The radio station was also a space for Efigenia to denounce clashes that took place between the Mobile Anti-Disturbance Squad (ESMAD), a unit of the National Police of Colombia, and the Kokonuko people, within the process called "recovery of Mother Earth". This is a mechanism through which indigenous communities claim territories, which according to these, have been historically stripped of them in processes such as colonization and armed conflict.

Efigenia was 31 years old when she was killed in clashes on October 8, 2017. Recently, she had separated from her partner, so her participation in the station had decreased since she had to devote more time to her three children. In addition, she had a crop of strawberries that helped her with the support of her family. Her work at the radio did not generate any income, she did it voluntarily.

Hilda María Astudillo, her mother, said “She became a journalist so she could be a voice for the voiceless. She was always campaigning for her family and her children so they could live in peace when they grow up.”

=== October 8, 2017 clashes ===
According to the virtual magazine Generación Paz, the Kokonuko community began a process of recovery of Mother Earth a few years ago in the Aguas Tibias property of Diego Angulo, a businessman from the City of Popayán (the Capital of the Colombian department of Cauca), where a tourist center and thermal water resort were located.

Efigenia went to the disputed property of Aguas Tibias to support and document a confrontation of her community with ESMAD on Sunday, October 8, 2017. She had the task of recording and reporting on what was happening in the area. At one point in the confrontation when the Kokonuko people threw stones, they heard gunshots coming from the ESMAD, one of those shots left Efigenia wounded in her chest, according to the Kokonuko people.

As documented by FLIP, members of the Indigenous Guard requested an ambulance to pick up Efigenia, but the driver told them that he was not allowed to enter the place. They got a private car to pick her up, but according to an indigenous Kokonuko, the ESMAD prevented the car from reaching Efigenia. At last, they were able to take her to the San José de Popayán Hospital (at the Capital City of Popayán), but she died because of her wound.

=== Investigations ===
The Colombian Health service made a press release that determined that the wound of Efigenia caused by a multiple-firearm projectiles, which caused a heart wound caused her death. The type of projectile could be a shotgun or an unconventional explosive device.

Different hypotheses arose who was the murder. The National Indigenous Organization of Colombia, ONIC, affirmed that the ESMD shot the communicator. The commander of the Police in the southwest of the country, William Salamanca, suggested that the Kokonuko community itself would have been responsible for the type of gunshot. The third hypothesis is the Prosecutor's Office and is that the death was caused by an explosive of shrapnel from one of the two parties.

Irina Bokova, that time the Director General of the United Nations Educational, Scientific and Cultural Organization (UNESCO), urgently asked the Colombian government investigate the murder of journalist. The FLIP asked the Colombian government to investigate the murder in order to punish the perpetrators of murder, praising Efigenia Vásquez Astudillo as journalist who was speaking for and defending rights of the indigenous people of Cauca.

Forbidden Stories included Efigenia in a list of 13 reporters investigating environmental issues that have been killed between 2009 and 2019.
