= Ríodoce =

Mexican weekly newspaper

Ríodoce is a Mexican weekly dedicated to coverage of organized crime and the Mexican drug war in Sinaloa, Mexico. The newspaper is based in Culiacán.

== History ==
The paper was founded in 2003 by a group of reporters from the daily Noroeste, including Javier Valdez Cárdenas.

In September 2009, Ríodoce published a series on drug trafficking entitled "Hitman: Confession of an Assassin in Ciudad Juárez." One morning a few days after the conclusion of the series, a grenade was thrown into Ríodoce's office, damaging the building but causing no injuries. The attackers were never identified.

In 2011, Valdez Cárdenas was awarded the International Press Freedom Award of the Committee to Protect Journalists, "an annual recognition of courageous journalism". Later in the same year, the trustees of Columbia University awarded Ríodoce the Maria Moors Cabot Prize for journalism that contributes to "inter-American understanding". In 2013, PEN International gave Ríodoce the "Excellence in Journalism" award.

On May 15, 2017, Valdez Cárdenas was shot and killed by unidentified gunmen. He was the sixth Mexican journalist killed in 2017.

== See also ==
- List of newspapers in Mexico
