= Santanu Bhowmik =

- Born: 12 January 1989
- Died: 20 September 2017 (aged 28); Tripura, India
- Cause of death: Murder
- Occupation: Journalist

Santanu Bhowmik (12 January 1989–20 September 2017) was a journalist murdered in the North-eastern state of Tripura in India while covering the raasta roko (road blockade) by Indigenous People's Front of Tripura (IPFT).

Santanu worked for Channel Dinraat television station and was covering a clash at Mandai between the indigenous wing of the ruling Communist Party of India (Marxist) and IPFT activists in which Bhowmik was suddenly attacked with sharp weapons.

He was later found with multiple stab injuries and died before he could be taken to a hospital. Police arrested four members of the IPFT in connection with the murder.

Santanu's father Sadhan Bhowmik has demanded that Central Bureau of Investigation probe the death.

== See also ==
- Sudip Datta Bhaumik
- List of journalists killed in India
