= Javier Valdez Cárdenas =

Mexican crime journalist and murder victim

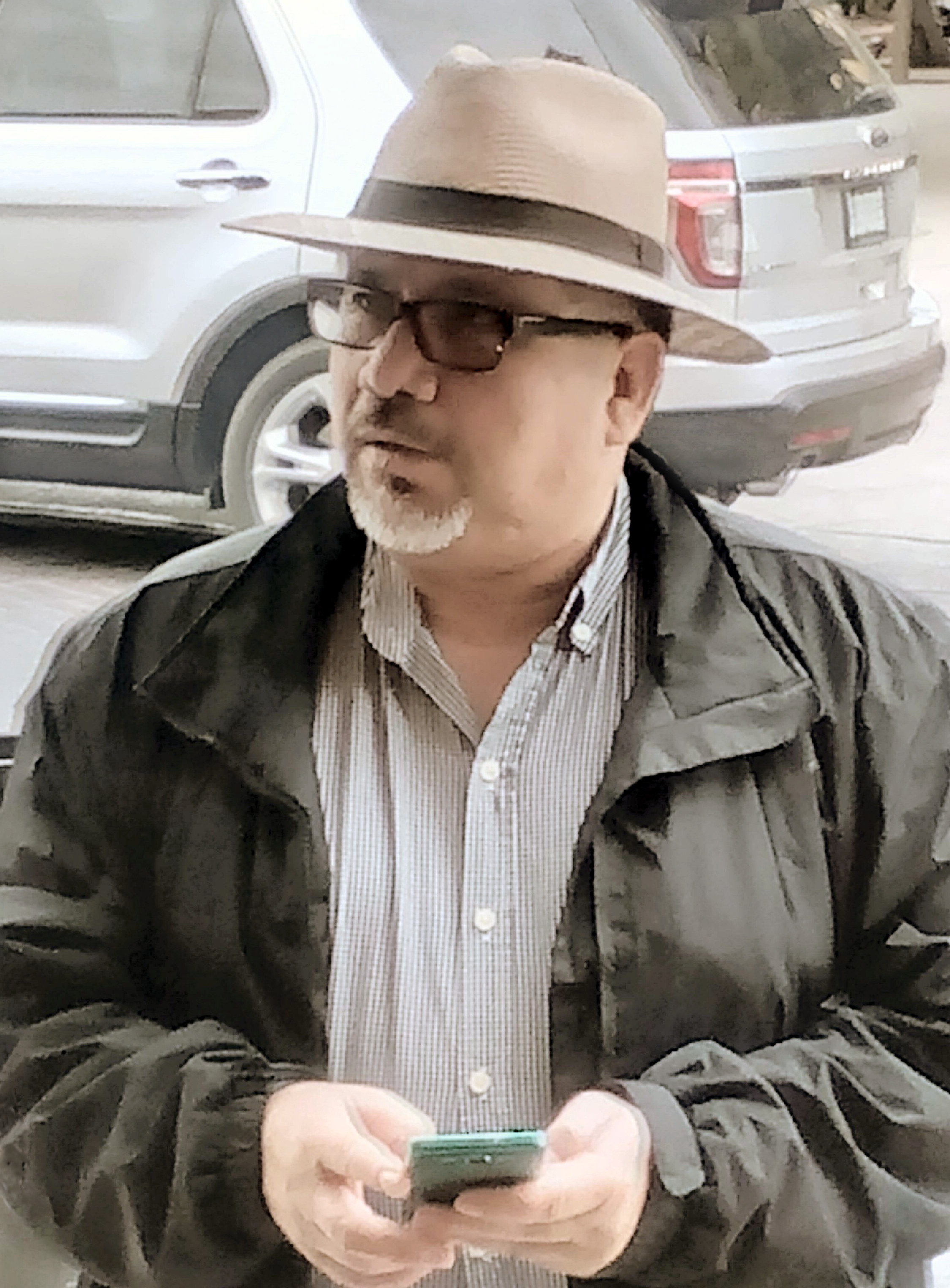
- Born: April 14, 1967; Culiacán, Sinaloa, Mexico
- Died: May 15, 2017 (aged 50); Culiacán, Sinaloa, Mexico
- Occupations: Journalist, author
- Organization: Ríodoce
- Known for: Investigative journalism of organized crime
- Awards: International Press Freedom Award (2011)

Javier Valdez Cárdenas (April 14, 1967 – May 15, 2017) was a Mexican journalist and founder of Ríodoce, a newspaper based in Sinaloa. He received several international awards for his writings on drug trafficking and organized crime in the Mexican drug war.

== Early life and career ==
Javier Valdez Cárdenas was born on April 14, 1967, in Culiacán, Sinaloa, Mexico. He graduated from the Autonomous University of Sinaloa with a degree in sociology. In the early 1990s, Valdez Cárdenas worked as a reporter for the national TV station, Canal 3, in Culiacán. He then joined the Sinaloa-based newspaper Noroeste and became a correspondent for the Mexico City-daily newspaper La Jornada in 1998.

In 2003, he and other reporters from the daily newspaper Noroeste founded Ríodoce, a weekly dedicated to crime and corruption in Sinaloa, considered one of Mexico's most violent states. Valdez Cárdenas was also the author of several books on drug trafficking, including Miss Narco, which chronicles the lives of the girlfriends and wives of drug lords, and Los morros del narco: Niños y jóvenes en el narcotráfico mexicano ("The Kids of the Drug Trade: Children and teenagers in Mexican drug trafficking").

In September 2009, Ríodoce published a series on drug trafficking entitled "Hitman: Confession of an Assassin in Ciudad Juárez." One morning a few days after the conclusion of the series, a grenade was thrown into Ríodoce's office, damaging the building but causing no injuries. The attackers were never identified.

Valdez Cárdenas' work is being continued by Forbidden Stories and the German newspaper Zeit online.

Before his death, Valdez Cárdenas was married to fellow journalist and human rights defender, Griselda Triana.

=== Awards ===
In 2011, Valdez Cárdenas was awarded the International Press Freedom Award of the Committee to Protect Journalists, "an annual recognition of courageous journalism". In his acceptance speech, he called the violence of Mexican drug trafficking "a tragedy that should shame us", blaming the citizenry of Mexico for giving the drug war its deaths and the governments of the US and Mexico for giving the drug war its guns. Later in the same year, the trustees of Columbia University awarded Ríodoce the Maria Moors Cabot Prize for journalism that contributes to "inter-American understanding".

== Death ==
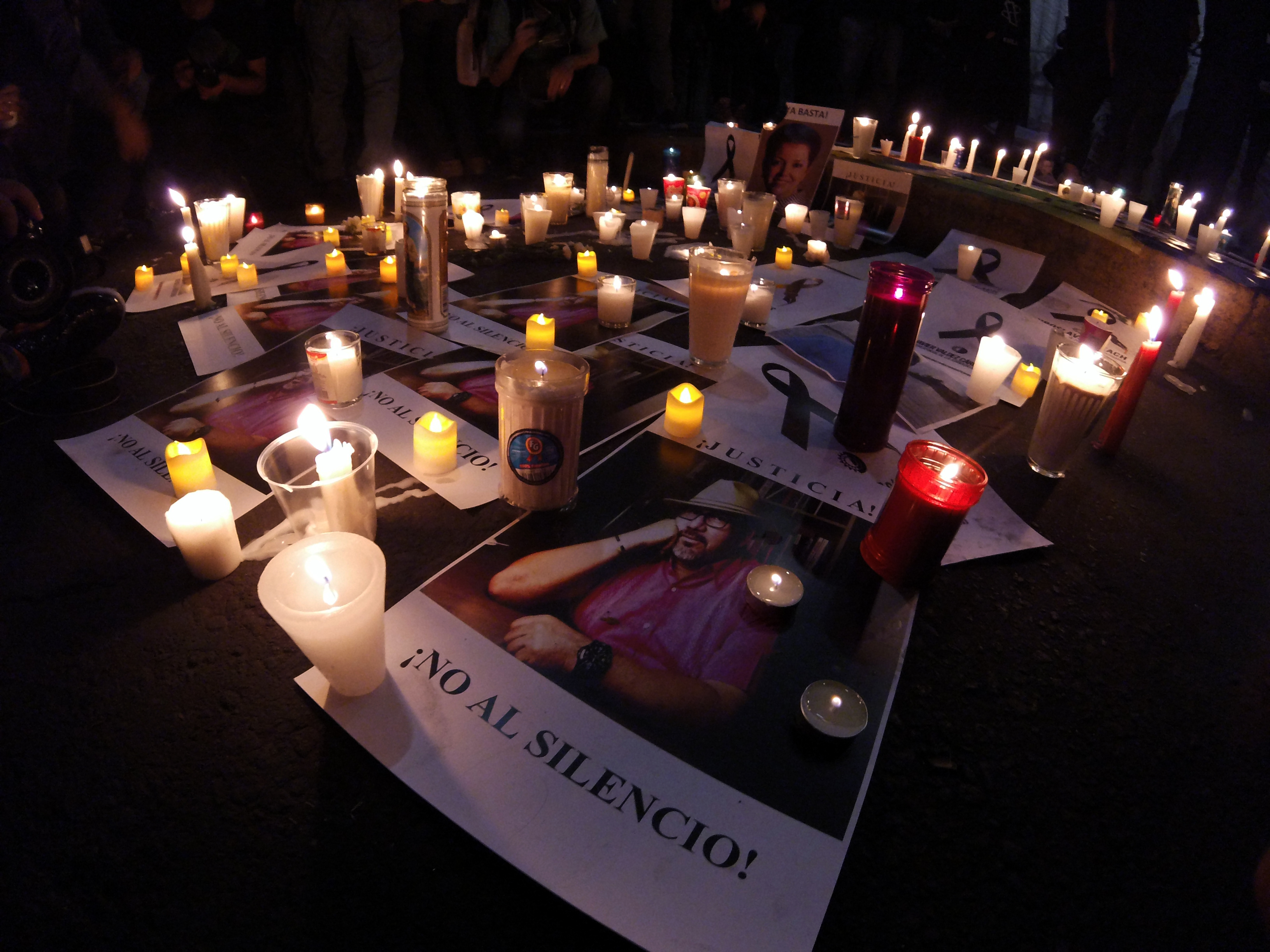
Demonstration against the murder of Javier Valdez, in Mexico City

On May 15, 2017, Valdez Cárdenas was shot 12 times and killed by unidentified gunmen around noon, blocks away from the Ríodoce offices in Culiacán, Sinaloa when he was 50 years old. The murder was condemned by the U.S. embassy in Mexico, the United Nations, and the European Union. A memorial to Cardenas was made in the Uncensored Library with his work available to be read.

== See also ==
- List of journalists and media workers killed in Mexico
