= Killing of Raju Risaldar =

Killing by police in India

Raju Risaldar, labelled the don of Vadodara (alt.: Baroda) by the media, was killed by police in an encounter (also referred to as the Vadodara encounter) in June 1993. Raju was accused of being involved in multiple cases of extortion, murder and contract killing. He was also a political activist of Shiv Sena and its chief of Vadodara district unit. Risalder rose to prominence following the August 1991 killing of a Congress Party leader.

In February 1993, Chief Minister Chimanbhai Patel was credited with strong-arming Risalder into an uneasy alliance to keep the peace between Hindu and Muslim communal activists in Baroda in the lead up to an election in which the BJP was expected to contest the traditional Congress Party dominance of elections in the region by issuing orders to have several of Risalder's lieutenants arrested. Risalder and Shiv Sena were then tasked with ensuring that the BJP turnout would be low. According to The Times of India, leaders of the Hindu community cooperated out of a desire to avert the communal rioting and destruction of shops and other property that were expected if Congress lost the election.

Risalder's henchmen were accused of murdering of Dinesh Pathak, the resident editor of the popular Gujarati daily Sandesh. Raju was arrested in Bombay and was shot dead by Gujarat Police in Vadodara.

== See also ==
- Pakki encounter
- Abdul Latif – Ahmedabad based don and his contemporary.
