= Sudip Datta Bhaumik =

Indian journalist

Sudip Datta Bhaumik (died 21 November 2017) was a journalist killed in the north-eastern state of Tripura in India by a police officer of the Tripura State Rifles during an altercation. Sudip was a reporter for the Bengali language newspaper Syandan Patrika and the local television channel News Vanguard. He had gone to meet the commandant of the Second TSR after obtaining an appointment with him. He had an altercation with a personal staff officer (PSO) of the commandant outside the latter’s office, during which the PSO shot him dead.

The Tripura chief minister, Manik Sarkar, and the union home minister of state, Kiren Rijiju, condemned the killing.

== See also ==
- Santanu Bhowmik
- List of journalists killed in India
