= Forbidden Stories =

Non-profit journalism organisation

- Formation: 2017; 9 years ago
- Founder: Laurent Richard
- Founded at: Paris
- Website: forbiddenstories.org

Forbidden Stories is a non-profit organization with the mission "to continue and publish the work of other journalists facing threats, prison, or murder." To achieve this, it allows journalists to send their work to Forbidden Stories, so other journalists have access to the material in case the original investigator is not able to follow it anymore. It partners with organizations such as Reporters Without Borders and Freedom of the Press Foundation.

Internationally it has been praised by the Columbia Journalism Review, Daily Times, Deutschlandfunk, The Guardian, Le Monde, and RTBF.

In March 2018, it received the "journalism project of the year" grand prize at the French Annual Journalism Summit and was on the shortlist of the European Press Prize for the category innovation in 2019.

== Background ==
The Forbidden Stories venture was envisioned by Laurent Richard, a French investigative journalist and filmmaker (Note: According to the April 17, 2018, Nieman Reports article, Laurent Richard is the co-founder of French public television show "Cash Investigation" and the producer of "several long-form investigative stories for television". In 2012 "Cash Investigation" uncovered the tax evasion scandal in Luxembourg, known as LuxLeaks. Richard oversaw coverage of LuxLeaks. The International Consortium of Investigative Journalists expanded on LuxLeaks with the Panama Papers. Richard was a 2017 Knight-Wallace fellow at the University of Michigan. He is also the founder and executive director of the nonprofit investigative newsroom Freedom Voices Network.) in 2015, after the January 7, 2015, Charlie Hebdo shooting in which 12 people were killed and 11 others were injured—all journalists and cartoonists—by members of terrorist group Al-Qaeda's branch in Yemen. The offices of Charlie Hebdo were near Richard's workplace.

Daphne Caruana Galizia died in a car bomb explosion on October 16, 2017. On October 30, 2017, Reporters Without Borders (RSF) and NGO Freedom Voices Network announced the launch of "Forbidden Stories," a secure encrypted online platform (Note: They use three open source technologies—Signal, PGP, and SecureDrop and host the data in many places.) that allows threatened journalists to upload their work and secure their data and information. Forbidden Stories, which was founded by Laurent Richard, allows journalists to continue the investigative reporting of "silenced" journalists and to unveil their stories to a wide audience. (Note: Richard and his cameraman were briefly detained in Baku on May 14 and their equipment was confiscated including his footage of his report on government corruption in Azerbaijan. Fortunately he had given a copy to Khadija Ismayilova, who "smuggled it to France on his behalf". According to an October 24, 2017 article by CJR's Jon Allsop, this experience was another motivation for "launching a centralized online platform for investigative journalists in dangerous situations". According to the Nieman Report, Azerbaijan filed a failed lawsuit against Richard and his colleague for "describing the country as a dictatorship on "Cash Investigation" —the "first time in history that a foreign government brought a defamation suit against French journalists on their own soil".) The purpose of "Forbidden Stories" was to "deter would-be attacks on journalists by backing up their work, and to publicize murders and disappearances of colleagues such as Caruana Galizia." Forbidden Stories continues the "work of killed, imprisoned, or otherwise incapacitated journalists."

Richard said The Daphne Project was modeled after similar initiatives in the past involving the murder of other journalists, such as The Arizona Project, in which 38 American journalists completed the investigative work of Don Bolles following his 1976 murder. In 2015 colleagues of Khadija Ismayilova of the Organized Crime and Corruption Reporting Project (OCCRP) continued her work on "the corruption and tax evasion of the ruling family in Baku" through The Khadija Project, after she was imprisoned in Azerbaijan. Associação Brasileira de Jornalismo Investigativo (ABRAJI), a Brazilian investigative journalism NGO, carried on the work of Tim Lopes who was burned alive for his work on drug trafficking in Rio de Janeiro in 2002.

== Stories ==
Forbidden Stories has continued the work of journalists after they have died:

- After the murder of Miroslava Breach, Forbidden Stories continues her investigation of human rights violations, drug trafficking, and government corruption in cooperation with Bellingcat and the Latin American Center for Investigative Journalism.
- In project Green Blood, the work of 13 journalists killed for reporting on environmental issues has continued: Crispin Perez, Desidario Camangyan, Ardiansyah Matra'is, Gerardo Ortega, Darío Fernández Jaén, Wisut Tangwittayaporn, Hang Serei Odom, Sai Reddy, Mikhail Beketov, Jagendra Singh, Soe Moe Tun, Karun Misra, and María Efigenia Vásquez Astudillo.
- The investigation of the kidnapping and murder of Ecuadorian journalist Javier Ortega, photographer Paúl Rivas, and their driver Efraín Segarra is part of Deadly border.
- After the murder of Daphne Caruana Galizia, Forbidden Stories continues her investigation in The Daphne Project.
- Javier Valdez Cárdenas was killed after his investigations into the Sinaloa Cartel.
- Cecilio Pineda was killed after claiming ties between local officials and drug traffickers in Mexico.
- The investigation into corruption in Ghanaian football was continued after the assassination of Ahmed Hussein-Suale.
- In the cartel project the report of Regina Martínez on "thousands of individuals who had mysteriously disappeared" and Mexican drug cartels has been continued.
- As part of an investigation into disinformation called Story Killers, the work of Gauri Lankesh was continued. The investigation series also exposed Team Jorge.
- Following the murder of Victoria Roshchyna on 19 September 2024 in a Russian jail, Forbidden Stories launched the international Viktoriia Project, to establish the circumstances of her death and investigate the circumstances of other Ukrainians (many civilians) held in Russian captivity.

In 2021 Forbidden Stories was part of the team of investigative journalists that published the Pegasus Project, about NSO spyware that targeted activists and journalists.

== Supporters ==
Prominent supporters are:

- Can Dündar, former editor-in-chief of Turkish newspaper Cumhuriyet
- Khadija Ismayilova, Azerbaijani investigative journalist
- Marina Walker Guevara, deputy director of the U.S.-based International Consortium of Investigative Journalists
- Bastian Obermayer, Pulitzer Prize-winning German investigative journalist with the newspaper Süddeutsche Zeitung
- Fabrice Arfi, Co-head of investigations at French online newspaper Mediapart
- Will Potter, American investigative journalist
