= Hindustan (newspaper) =

Indian Hindi-language daily newspaper

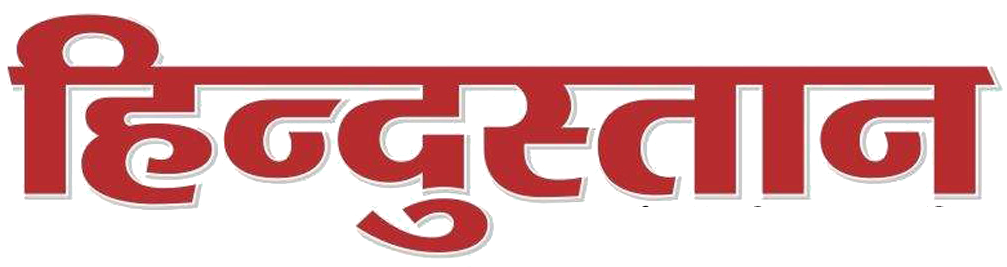

- Type: Daily newspaper
- Format: Broadsheet
- Owner: HT Media Ltd
- Publisher: Ajay Kumar Jain
- Editor-in-chief: Shashi Shekhar
- Founded: 12 April 1936; 89 years ago
- Language: Hindi
- Headquarters: Kasturba Gandhi Marg, New Delhi - 110001
- Country: India
- Circulation: 1,666,724 (as of April 2023)
- Sister newspapers: Hindustan Times; Mint
- Website: www.livehindustan.com

Hindustan (IAST: Hindustāna) is an Indian Hindi-language daily newspaper. According to WAN-IFRA, it ranked 13th in the world by circulation in 2016 and per the Audit Bureau of Circulations was 6th in India in 2022. Madan Mohan Malaviya launched it in 1936. It is published by Hindustan Media Ventures Limited. Earlier it was part of HT Media Ltd group, which spun off its Hindi business into a separate company named Hindustan Media Ventures Limited in December 2009.

It ranks as the second most-read daily in the country. Hindustan has 21 editions across Hindi belt. They are spread across Delhi, Haryana (Faridabad), Bihar (Patna, Muzaffarpur, Gaya, Bhagalpur and Purnea), Jharkhand (Ranchi, Jamshedpur and Dhanbad), Uttar Pradesh (Lucknow, Varanasi, Meerut, Agra, Allahabad, Gorakhpur, Bareilly, Moradabad, Aligarh, and Kanpur) and Uttarakhand (Dehradun, Haridwar, Haldwani). Apart from these, the paper is also available in key towns like Mathura, Saharanpur, Faizabad. The major editions of Hindustan are available online in epaper format.

== In Bihar ==
Hindustan dominates in Bihar with a readership of about 5 million (as per the IRS 2011, Q4). It commands a massive 73% share of the Hindi readership market of Bihar. On 24 April 2018, Hindustan launched its 5th edition in Purnea. On 13 May 2016, Hindustan's reporter, Rajdev Ranjan, was shot to death in a drive-by shooting.

== See also ==
- Print media in India
