= This Land Belongs to the Army =

- Directed by: Maga.Tamizh Prabhagaran
- Produced by: Maga.Tamizh Prabhagaran, under the banner of Beyond Slavery Frames
- Cinematography: Maga.Tamizh Prabhagaran; Vetri Velan
- Music by: isaivaanar Sampath Selvam; Melvin R.Young
- Release date: 31 January 2014 (United Kingdom)
- Running time: 49 min.
- Language: English

This Land Belongs to the Army is a 2014 documentary film by Indian journalist and filmmaker Maga.Tamizh Prabhagaran. This film shows Sri Lankan civil war and shows the current post-war status of Sri Lanka. It also shows several controversial acts by the Sri Lankan government and the armed forces including Sinhalization and Land grabbing by the military. The film also features new testimonies from Tamil victims and an exclusive interview with a who is said to be a Sri Lankan Army officer, who speaks about the use of chemical and heavy weapons during the civil war.

The film maker was detained by the Sri Lankan State Forces under terrorism charges but the film was completed by January 2014.

== Release in British Parliament and screening in the University College London ==
This film was released in Houses of Commons, British Parliament on January 31, 2014. The full film was screened in University College London on second day of 'International Conference on State Grabs of Tamil Land in the Island of Sri Lanka' organized by British Tamils Forum.

== Screening in United Nations ==
A special sub conference during 25th regular session of United Nations Human Rights Council to discuss on human rights problems in Sri Lanka was held on 25 March 2014. Sri Lankan human rights activists Nimalka Fernando, Sunandha Deshapriya, Fr. Bondcarlant, representatives of the amnesty international, several Indian human rights activists also in discussion. At the end of the conference " This Land Belongs to the Army" documentary film by Maga.Tamizh Prabhagaran was screened to the delegates.

== Filmmaker arrested ==
During the filmmaker Sri Lankan trip, he was arrested by Sri Lankan Army and detained for four days by Terrorist Investigation Department. After the pressure of International communities, Journalist Movements, Tamil Parties and Indian Government he was released on 28 December 2013.

New York based movement Committee to Protect Journalists called for the immediate release of an Indian journalist and filmmaker who was arrested in Sri Lanka on Wednesday while allegedly filming and photographing a military base.

Prabhakaran was arrested by Sri Lankan security forces in the northern Kilinochchi district and is undergoing an investigation by the island nation's Terrorist Investigation Department on charges of violating visa regulations and taking pictures of a military installation, The New Indian Express reported.

Tamil Prabhakaran, who is a contributor to Junior Vikatan, a Chennai-based Tamil-language magazine, was working on a documentary about the current state of the Tamil population in the north, according to international news reports.

== Alleged use of chemicals weapons during the war ==
The Indian news channel NewsX broadcast the footage of a person who appears to be a Sri Lankan army soldier reportedly boasting of the use of chemical weapons against LTTE fighters and civilians during the final stages of the armed conflict in Sri Lanka.

But as per media reports the filmmaker Maga.Tamizh Prabhagaran listup the proofs for chemical weapons usage in Sri Lanka. From his interview 'The cartoonist Prageeth Eknaligoda went missing after he started researching the Sri Lankan military's chemical weapon use and started publicising his findings to diplomats out of Sri Lanka. His wife also wrote a letter to BBC Sinhala about Prageeth's chemical weapons investigation.

=== Interview of an army officer ===
The footage shows an alleged Sri Lankan soldier pointing to a chemical weapon and describing in detail how it works.

"This one is a very potent weapon," says the soldier pointing to ammunition, adding, "When it hits the grounds it disintegrates into several pieces. The chemical in this burns the skin immediately, We used this in the last stages of the war. We used it on LTTE fighters holed up on the beach. All the people died when we used this" Pointing to another store of weapons, a soldier explains, "This one is dropped from a plane. It will explode only when it hits the ground. An area of 1 square Km is completely destroyed by this".

=== Sri Lankan reaction ===
Sri Lankan army spokesperson Brigadier Ruwan Wanigasooriya denied the allegations and told the media "As you know Sri Lanka did not manufacture weapons or munitions and we procured our inventories from know suppliers through government to government interventions. The LTTE however were known for their attempts at manufacturing arms and munitions and large stocks of chemicals were even recovered from their bases during search operations. The latest video is another attempt by some parties to sensationalize baseless allegation against the Army in particular and the Government in general. We reject such appalling attempts driven by vested interests".

== Film Festivals ==
1. Official Selection : 7th International Documentary and Short Film Festival of Kerala 2. Official Selection : International Festival of Local Televisions 2014 3. Screened in Social Justice Film Festival, Chennai

== Awards ==
Kalakkam's Best Documentary Award'2014

- Kalakkam – Art and Literature Movement

Special Mention

- Social Justice Film Festival

== See also ==
- Maga.Tamizh Prabhagaran, director
- Manipur: The Land of Tears, film by same director
