= St. Philip Neri Church shelling =

2006 artillery bombing in Allaipiddy, Sri Lanka

- The Roman Catholic church which provided shelter to the refugees after the Allaipiddy massacre and during the subsequent shelling
- Location: Allaipiddy, Jaffna district, Sri Lanka
- Date: 13 August 2006 (+6 GMT)
- Target: Sri Lankan Tamil refugees
- Attack type: Artillery fire
- Weapon: Artillery shells
- Deaths: 36
- Perpetrator: Sri Lankan Army

The St. Philip Neri Church shelling by the Sri Lankan Army occurred in Allaipiddy village, off the coast of Sri Lanka's Jaffna Peninsula, on 13 August 2006 . The shelling killed 36 Tamil civilians and injured as many as 54.

== Background ==
As tensions increased between the rebel Liberation Tigers of Tamil Eelam (LTTE) and the Sri Lankan Army, small clashes took place near Allaipiddy. It is believed that the LTTE was planning to overrun Jaffna. Hundreds of civilians took shelter in St. Philip Neri Church because of the fighting and to avoid shelling.

== Incident ==
On the morning of 12 August 2006, LTTE cadres landed near Allaipiddy, prompting government forces to withdraw to the nearby Navy base. The Sri Lankan Army then commenced shelling LTTE positions, continuing through the night. By midnight, the LTTE called off its offensive and left Allaipiddy. However, the Army and the Navy kept firing indiscriminately on the area; and on the early morning of 13th August long range artillery shells from the army camps in Jaffna town and Palaly fell on the St. Philip Neri Church at 04:30 am, killing 20 Tamil civilians and injuring 54. The final death roll rose up to 36 in the following days.

== Aftermath ==
The wounded civilians were prevented from being taken to the Jaffna Hospital for treatment by the hostile Navy at Allaipiddy junction but were allowed to proceed after pleading by the Catholic priest Fr. Thiruchelvam Nihal Jim Brown and the Acting Magistrate of Kayts. On 20th August, Fr. Brown disappeared on his way to check on the church, suspected to be at the hands of local Navy men who had become suspicious of him following the shelling.

The Army denied responsibility for the shelling of the church and suggested that the LTTE was to blame. However, according to the former parish priest of Allaipiddy, most people believe that the church was hit by fire from government forces. The UTHR(J) reported that survivors claimed that the shelling came from a military base in Palaly. AsiaNews repeated this claim.

== See also ==
- List of attacks on civilians attributed to Sri Lankan government forces
