= List of Indian documentary filmmakers =

This is a list of notable documentary filmmakers from India arranged in alphabetical order.

== A ==
- Amrit Vatsa
- A. K. Chettiar
- Aarti Shrivastava
- Akanksha Damini Joshi
- Amudhan R P
- Anand Patwardhan
- Anurag Singh
- Anwar Jamal
- Aparna Sanyal
- Arun Chadha
- Ashvin Kumar
- Shah Alam (filmmaker)

== B ==
- Bharat Bala
- Biju Toppo

== C ==
- C. S. Venkiteswaran
- Chalam Bennurkar

== D ==
- Debalina Majumder
- Deepika Narayan Bhardwaj
- Dinanath Gopal Tendulkar
- Dr.Shri Prakash Baranwal
- [Divya Bharathi]

== E ==
- Ezra Mir

== F ==
- Faiza Ahmad Khan
- Farha Khatun

== G ==
- Gauhar Raza
- George Thengummoottil
- Goutam Ghose
- Sonali Gulati

== H ==
- Harjant Gill

== J ==
- Jagat Murari

== K ==
- Kartiki Gonsalvus (Academy Award Winner for best short documentary)
- Kalyan Varma
- K P SASI
- K. Bikram Singh
- K. M. Chaitanya
- Kabir Khan

== L ==
- Lalit Vachani
- Leena Manimekalai

== M ==
- M. F. Husain
- Maga.Tamizh Prabhagaran
- Mainak Bhaumik
- Mazhar Kamran
- Mike Pandey
- Mira Nair
- Meghnath
- Mujibar Rahaman
- Munmun Dalaria

== N ==
- Nakul Singh Sawhney
- Nandan Saxena
- Nisha Pahuja
- Nishtha Jain
- Nirmal Baby Varghese

== P ==
- Pan Nalin
- Payal Kapadia
- Pankaj Butalia
- Paromita Vohra
- Prakash Jha
- Parvez Sharma
- Pavel (film director)
- Pranab Kumar Aich

== Q ==
- Qaushiq Mukherjee

== R ==
- Raja Sen
- Rajesh S. Jala
- Rajesh Touchriver
- Rakesh Sharma (filmmaker)
- Ritu Sarin
- Rintu Thomas
- Ramon Chibb
- Rituparno Ghosh
- Ritwik Ghatak
- Renu Negi

== S ==
- Sandesh Kadur
- Shiny Benjamin
- Saba Dewan
- Sanjay Kak
- Sathish Kalathil
- Satyaprakash Upadhyay
- Shashwati Talukdar
- Shriprakash Prakash
- Shaunak Sen
- Shekar Dattatri
- Sonali Gulati
- Sridhar Rangayan
- Stalin K
- Sushmit Ghosh
- Shyam Benegal

== T ==
- Tarun Majumdar

== V ==
- Vidhu Vinod Chopra
- Vijaya Mulay
- Vinay Shukla
- Varrun Sukhraj
