= K. S. Balachandran =

Indian actor (1944–2014)

K.S. Balachandran
- Born: 10 July 1944
- Origin: Jaffna, Sri Lanka
- Died: 26 February 2014 (aged 69)
- Genres: Theater play, short films
- Occupations: Actor, writer, director, producer
- Years active: 1970–2013
- Website: www.ksbalachandran.ca

K. S. Balachandran (Tamil: கே. எஸ். பாலச்சந்திரன்; 10 July 1944 – 26 February 2014) was a Sri Lankan Tamil actor, writer, director and producer whose career spanned over four decades in Sri Lanka and Canada. His work focused largely on Tamil theatre and film.

Balachandran was known for his contributions to Sri Lankan Tamil radio drama and later to Tamil Canadian media and cinema. He continued his filmmaking in Toronto, Ontario, Canada, where he appeared in several independent productions and hosted a satirical television talk show, The Wonderful YT Lingam Show, which commented on current affairs and cultural topics.

Earlier in his career, he gained attention in Sri Lanka for his acting and writing in Tamil radio plays, noted for their distinct dialects and cultural realism.

Balachandran also received posthumous recognition for his influence on Tamil-language media in Canada.

He died in February 2014 due to heart complications.

== Filmography ==
- Vaadai Kaatru (1978)
- Aval Oru Jeevanathi (1980)
- Nadu Potra Vaalka (1981)
- Sharmilavin Idhaya Raagam (1993)
- 1999 (2009)
