= A Gun & a Ring =

- Directed by: Lenin M. Sivam
- Written by: Lenin M. Sivam
- Produced by: Vishnu Muralee
- Starring: Jon Berrie; Thenuka K Baskar M Mathivasan S Kandasamy G David B George; Arthur Simeon
- Cinematography: Suresh Rohin
- Edited by: Pras Lingam; Lenin M. Sivam
- Music by: Pravin Mani
- Production company: Eyecatch Multimedia Inc
- Release date: 2013
- Running time: 104 minutes
- Country: Canada
- Language: Tamil

A Gun & a Ring is a 2013 Canadian Tamil-language drama film written and directed by Lenin M. Sivam. The film explores the harsh realities faced by different generations of Toronto Sri Lankans. It was nominated for Golden Goblet Award at the 16th Shanghai International Film Festival. It was also officially selected for the 37th Montreal World Film Festival (WFF) took place 22 August – 2 September 2013 to present under "Focus on World Cinema".

== Plot ==
The film explores the intertwined stories of seemingly ordinary people over a two-week period in Toronto. A young man, Gnanam, who attributes all his failures to his dark past and tries to confront it once and for all; a passionate detective, John, who questions his integrity and passion after making a fateful call; a depressed gay teenager, Aathi, who blames his father and his ideology for the suicidal death of his lover; a compassionate widower, Sornam, who is too preoccupied with the war back in Sri Lanka to protect his daughter from harm's way; a grieving man, Ariyam, who questions his immigrant life in Canada after the tragic death of his only son; and a brave young war victim, Aby, who arrives at a Canadian airport with the hope of a fresh start only to find that she's been abandoned by her fiancé. The film tries to delve deeper into the harsh realities faced by different generations of immigrants as they try to build a life in the adopted land yet unable to let go of their pasts.

== Cast ==
- Jon Berrie as Detective John
- Thenuka Kantharajah as Aby
- Baskar Mahendran as Gnanam
- Mathivasan Seenivasagam as Sornam
- Kandasamy Gangatharan as Ariyam
- Shelly Antony as Aathi
- David Brandon George as George
- Sekar Thambirajah as Navam
- Arthur Simeon as Abit
- Selvajothy Ravindran as Latha
- Gobi Thiru as Senthil
- Michael Johnson as Detective Peter
- Bhavani Somasundaram as Kala
- Kiruthika Thusyanthan as Sevanthi
- Mayoora Manokararasan as Malar
- Thenusha Yogathasan as Meenu
- Kokilan Maheswaran as Raj
- Suthan Mahalingam as Alex
- Komeswaran Annalingam as Young Gnanam
- Nisar Nagalay as Muthupandi

== Production ==
According to CBC, with this film, Sivam "subverts the traditional Tamil love story with a tender trans romance". The film was noted for its depiction of the "Sri Lankan civil war’s impact on Toronto-area Tamils" and "(t)ouching upon controversial social issues that affect the Tamil diaspora".

== Recognitions ==
- Golden Goblet Award Nominee, Shanghai International Film Festival in June, 2013
- Official Selection, Montreal World Film Festival in August, 2013
- Official Selection, Louisville's International Festival of Film in October, 2013
- Official Selection, American CineRockom International Film Festival in October, 2013
- Best Film Award Nominee, Hamilton Film Festival in November, 2013
- Best Film, Best Director and Best Actress Awards, Norway Tamil Film Festival in April, 2014
- Privilege screening, Chennai Women's International Film Festival in May, 2014
- Official Selection, International Film Festival of Colombo in September, 2014
- Best Film, Best Director, Best Editor, Best Actor and Best Actress Awards, Chennai Kalakam Awards in October, 2014
- Best Film, Best Director, Best Screenplay, Best Editor, Best Actress, Best Villain, Best Composer and Best Child Artist Awards, Canadian Tamil Film Awards in May, 2015
