= Sengadal =

2011 film

- Poster
- Directed by: Leena Manimekalai
- Written by: C. Jerrold; Antonythasan Jesuthasan
- Produced by: Janaki Sivakumar
- Starring: Leena Manimekalai; Antonythasan Jesuthasan
- Cinematography: M. J. Radhakrishnan
- Edited by: Sreekar Prasad
- Music by: L. V. Ganesan
- Production company: Tholl Paavai Theatres
- Release date: August 2011 (Durban)
- Running time: 90 minutes
- Country: India
- Languages: Tamil; English

Sengadal (The Dead Sea) is a 2011 Indian Tamil-language independent film written and directed by Leena Manimekalai, who makes her directing debut and stars in the film. Produced by Janaki Sivakumar, the film features cinematography by M. J. Radhakrishnan and editing by Sreekar Prasad. The film was initially banned by the regional centre of the Censor Board, but Appellate Tribunal authorities of the board at New Delhi cleared the film in July 2011 after legal struggle. Sengadal was part of the Indian Panorama at the 42nd International Film Festival of India after the censor board had cleared the film.

== Plot ==
At Dhanushkodi arrive the Tamil refugees from Sri Lanka, an unending stream of people dispossessed of their lands and Gods, to an uncertain future with ever receding hopes of return. Fishermen fishing in ignorance of friendly and enemy waters get dumped as rebels, spies and smugglers and unceremoniously beaten to death or shot or maimed. Yet, each morning sees their boats launched once again. Manimekalai, the filmmaker, Munusamy, the fisherman, Rosemary, the social worker in Jesuit Christian Refugee Services, try hard to retain their sanity in this mad jumble. Their interactions with the dead or living refugees, their skirmishes with the Indian and Sri Lankan States, their personal lives overrun by external events - form the kernel of this narration. Soori, a half-wit Sri Lankan Tamil, who connects to the world through his radio, stands aloof in this bleak world of despair sending lightning jolts of truth into the dark recesses of History. No wonder, he vanishes into the blue and Manimekalai is forced by the State to return to the world of civil obedience. Munusamy is killed and Rosemary turns to her God, the same God who parted the Red Sea to save his flock in their flight from annihilation.

== Cast ==
- Shobasakthi
- Leena Manimekalai
- Nimal
- Rosemary

== Production ==
This film was a people participatory work, says director. The movie was filmed in Dhanuskodi, India which is just 18 km from Sri Lanka. When talking about the movie, the director says, the real victory of her movie would be, even if one fisherman is saved from killing of Sri Lankan navy. Writer, director, producer Leena Manimekalai, tried gather funds via crowd sourcing for the distribution of the movie.

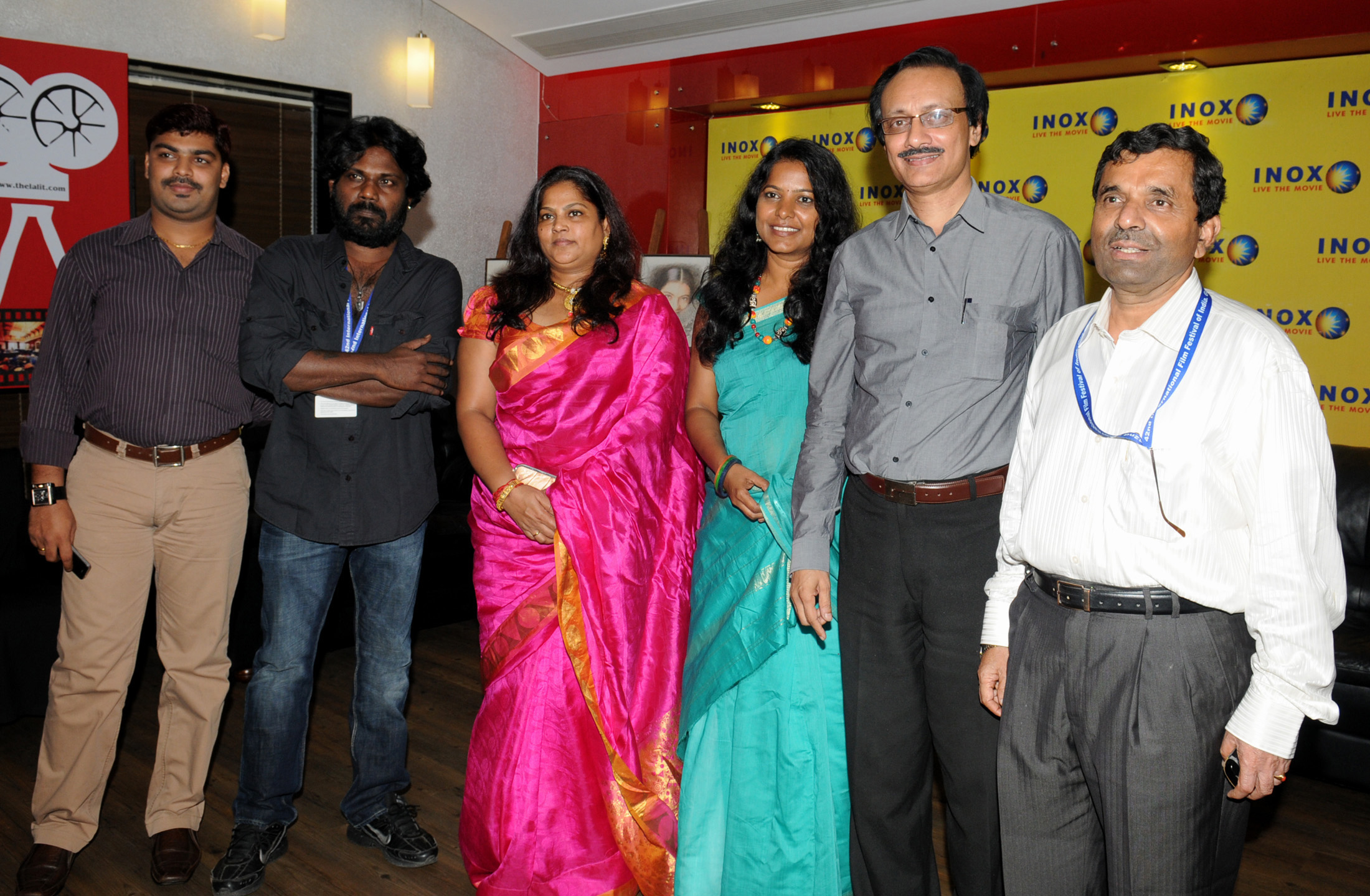
Film crew, IFFI (2011)

== List of official selections ==
- Sengadal the DeadSea had won the GFI Production grant for 2010
- Only Tamil film to be screened at the 42nd International Film Festival of India.
- Official Selection, International Competition, 32nd Durban International Film Festival, August 2011
- Official Selection, First Film Competition, 35th World Montreal Film Festival, September 2011
- Official Selection, International Competition, Mumbai Film Fest, MAMI, October 2011
- NAWFF Award (Best Asian Woman Film award), Tokyo International Film Festival, November 2011
- Indian Panorama, Indian International Film Festival, Goa, December 2011
- World Cinema Official Selection, International Film Festival of Kerala, 2011
- Chithrabarathi Competition, Bangalore International Film Festival, 2011
- Official Korean Premiere, International Women Film Festival, South Korea, 2012
- Official Taiwan Premiere, International Women Film Festival, Taipei, 2012
- NAWFF Premieres at International Women Film Festivals at Israel and Beijing, 2012
- Pecheurs De Monde International Film Festival, Lorient, France, 2013
- Rare Picks at Hundred years of Indian Cinema Package, 2013
