= 1999 (film) =

2009 film by Lenin M. Sivam

- 1999 international poster
- Directed by: Lenin M. Sivam
- Written by: Lenin M. Sivam
- Produced by: Sabesan Jeyarajasingam; Jeya Subramaniyam
- Starring: K. S. Balachandran; Ampalavanar Katheeswaran; Suthan Mahalingam; Thelepan Somasegaram; Kaandee Kana; Deva Gasparson; Vince Jerad; Sutha Shan; Madona T. Alphonse; Mannoge Rajanan; Gobiraj Thiruchelvam
- Cinematography: Sabesan Jeyarajasingam
- Edited by: Arul Shankar
- Music by: Raj Thillaiyampalam
- Production companies: Khatpanalaya Production Inc; Bagavan Productions
- Release dates: 14 October 2009 (Vancouver International Film Festival); 23 October 2009 (Canada)
- Running time: 101 minutes
- Country: Canada
- Language: Tamil

1999 is a 2009 Canadian Tamil-language crime drama film written and directed by Lenin M. Sivam. It had its world premiere at the 2009 Vancouver International Film Festival (VIFF).

The film explores a Toronto Sri Lankan gang scene in the late 1990s. With a time frame that spans less than 24 hours, it attempts to delve deep inside the Tamil gang community. It opens with a shooting that results in the end of a peace treaty between two rival gangs in Scarborough. With investigators closing in and rival gang members out for revenge, 1999 maps out the toll that gang participation takes not only on the individual, but the direct impacts it has on family and community.

The film received the CBC Audience Choice Award at the 2010 ReelWorld Film Festival, was one of the top 10 Canadian films at Vancouver International Film Festival, and received the Midnight Sun Award at the 2010 Oslo Tamil Film Festival. The film addresses the topic of crime in Toronto by "exploring the rivalry between two gangs" in the city.

== Cast ==
- Thussanth as Anpu
- Thelepan Somasegaram as Kumar
- Kaandee Kana as Ahilan
- Ampalavanar Ketheeswaran as Suntharam
- K. S. Balachandran as Ahilan's grandfather
- Madona T. Alphonse as Udumpan
- Vince Jerad as Mathan
- Deva Gasperson as Moddayan
- Gobiraj Thiruchelvam as Kannan
- Ajith Nagarajah as Nanthan
- Jeron Thanabalasingam as Jeevan
- Sutha Shan as Aavi
- Anojan Thavaraja as Sathi
- Mannoge Rajanan as Murali
- Satheeskumar Ehamparam as Soonan
- Visnumathan Vilvaraja as Maranai's brother
- Thavakumar Ketharanathan as Suganthan
- Latheepan Tharmanathan as Kiruban
- Pathmini Rajanan as Selvi Acca
- Sugunathan Mahendrarajah as taxi driver

== Soundtrack ==
The soundtrack of 1999 was composed by Raj Thillaiyampalam except for tracks "Struggle" and "Angel Remix", which were composed by Hemo from Lyrically Strapped. It was produced by Lenin M. Sivam.

Track #	Song	Singer(s)	Lyrics
1	"Mozhi"	S P Balasubramaniam	Sutharshan
2	"Angel"	Karthik, Lyrically Strapped	Raj Thillaiyampalam
3	"Malare"	Tippu / Harini	Sutharshan
4	"Struggle"	Lyrically Strapped	Lyrically Strapped
5	"Nenjathai"	Tippu / Prashanthi	Raj Thillaiyampalam
6	"Angel Remix"	Lyrically Strapped	Lyrically Strapped
7	"1999 Theme"	Instrumental	Instrumental

== Production ==
The film, "an exploration of Tamil youth gangs that once fought in the streets of Scarborough, was informed by the director’s interviews with ex-gang members and youth workers."

The film was described by Variety as the director's "breakout first feature (...) set on Toronto’s late ‘90s Sri Lankan gang scene."

== Awards and recognitions ==
- CBC Reel Audience Choice Award, ReelWorld Film Festival in April 2010
- Best Film Award (Midnight Sun), Oslo Tamil Film Festival in February 2010
- Top 10 Canadian Films, Vancouver International Film Festival in October 2009
- Official Selection, Toronto Tamil Studies Conference in May 2010
- Best Feature Film Award, Toronto Independent Art Film Society (IAFS) in June 2010
- Official Selection, University of Toronto Cinema Studies Student Union (CINSSU) in March 2010
- Official Selection, York University Centre for Asian Research (YCAR) in September 2010
- Part of the 'Best Features' Showcase, Toronto 2010 Moving Image Film Festival (MIFF) in October 2010
- Official Selection, Swiss South Indian Film Festival (SSIFF) in October 2010
- Official Selection, Illankai Tamil Sangam (ITS) in November 2010
- Official Selection, Canadian Tamil Film Festival (CTFF) in January 2011
- Official Selection, London Happy Soul Festival (HSF) in June 2011
- Best Feature Film Award, Chennai Ulagayutha International Tamil Film Festival (CUITFF) in July 2011
