= Allaipiddy massacre =

2006 massacre in Jaffna, Sri Lanka

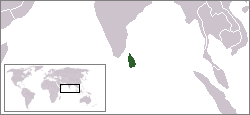
- Location of Sri Lanka
- Location: Allaipiddy, Jaffna district, Sri Lanka
- Date: May 13, 2006 (+05:30 GMT)
- Target: Sri Lankan Tamil civilians
- Attack type: Firing
- Weapon: Guns
- Deaths: 13

The Allaipiddy massacre or Allaipiddy murders refers to the May 13, 2006 killing of 13 minority Tamil civilians in separate incidents in three villages on the islet of Kayts in northern Sri Lanka.

== Incident ==
The massacre took place on the night of May 13, 2006 in the villages of Allaipiddy, Puliyankoodal, and Vangalady. In each of the three incidents, Sri Lankan Navy entered a home and opened fire on the residents. The deadliest incident took place in Allaipiddy, where nine people, including two children, died. Three more were killed in Puliyankoodal and one in Vangalady. Several people were wounded. The killings took place two days after the Liberation Tigers of Tamil Eelam (LTTE) launched a suicide assault on a naval convoy in which 18 sailors died.

At least 150 people fled Allaipiddy after the massacre. Refugees who reached the de facto rebel capital Killinochchi, who spoke through an LTTE translator, alleged harassment by the Sri Lankan Navy and accused it of carrying out the massacre.

== Reactions ==
The Sri Lankan government denounced the killings and blamed the LTTE, suggesting that the massacre "could very well be a part of the LTTE strategy to divert international opinion". The LTTE, meanwhile, blamed the government.

The International Crisis Group identified the Sri Lankan Navy and members of the Eelam People’s Democratic Party, an anti-LTTE Tamil political party and paramilitary organization, as the most likely culprits. The local human rights group University Teachers for Human Rights stated that it had confirmed the involvement of Navy personnel and EPDP members and Amnesty International acknowledged that it had "received credible reports that Sri Lanka Navy personnel and armed cadres affiliated with the [EPDP] ... were present at the scene of the killings".

After the massacre, Anglican Bishop Duleep de Chickera visited Allaipiddy as part of a fact-finding mission to northern Sri Lanka. In his report he stated:

"After I visited the Allaipiddy island and saw for myself the tension that prevailed after the gruesome massacre of civilians, eight of whom belonged to one family. Surviving members of this family witnessed the killing and are likely to be able to identify the killers. The movement of civilians from this island following a threatening order presumably by a group adds to the misery of this people and to the complex nature of human suffering. In such instances the people have little desire to move and it is only a speedy investigation into the massacre and deliberate measures of dialogue and trust building between the people and the Sri Lanka Armed Forces that will somewhat stem the fear and panic and dislocation of an already previously displaced people".

== Investigation ==
Local newspapers have reported that the investigation into the murders has stalled in Kayts District Courts due to lack of cooperation from various involved parties.

== See also ==
- St. Philip Neri Church bombing
- List of attacks on civilians attributed to Sri Lankan government forces
