= Lenin M. Sivam =

Sri Lankan-born Canadian filmmaker

Lenin M. Sivam is a Sri Lankan-born Canadian filmmaker, writer, director, editor, and producer based in Toronto, Ontario. His work focuses on stories drawn from Sri Lankan Tamil diaspora communities and explores themes of identity, migration, secrecy, trauma, and social stigma. He is known for feature films including 1999 (2009), A Gun & a Ring (2013), Roobha (2018), and The Protector (2022).

His films have screened at international festivals including the Vancouver International Film Festival, Montreal World Film Festival, ReelWorld Film Festival, and Fantasia International Film Festival, and have received audience awards and international recognition within diaspora film circuits.

== Early life and background ==
Sivam was born in Jaffna, Sri Lanka, and later immigrated to Canada, settling in Toronto. His work is closely informed by the experiences of the Sri Lankan Tamil community in Scarborough and the broader Greater Toronto Area, and by the social realities of immigrant life in Toronto.

== Career ==
=== Early work ===
Before directing feature films, Sivam made short films and developed projects centred on South Asian immigrant experiences in Canada, establishing his focus on community-based storytelling and socially grounded narratives.

=== 1999 (2009) ===
Sivam wrote and directed the Tamil-language crime drama 1999, which examines gang violence among Tamil youth in Scarborough, Toronto, and the social pressures facing immigrant families.

The film was selected for the Vancouver International Film Festival as part of the Canadian Images program and screened at ReelWorld Film Festival.

Coverage in NOW Toronto and the Waterloo Chronicle highlighted the film’s engagement with intergenerational conflict and youth alienation within the Tamil diaspora.

=== A Gun & a Ring (2013) ===
Sivam’s second feature, A Gun & a Ring, is a multi-character ensemble drama set in Toronto’s Sri Lankan Tamil community, exploring interconnected lives shaped by migration, secrecy, and the long shadow of the Sri Lankan civil war.

The film screened at the Montreal World Film Festival and received coverage from the Montreal Gazette, Tamil Guardian, Behindwoods, TamilCulture, and Lanka Reporter.

Reports noted sold-out screenings in London and strong audience response within diaspora communities.

=== Roobha (2018) ===
In 2018, Sivam wrote and directed Roobha, a Tamil-language Canadian feature film centred on a romance between a married Sri Lankan Tamil man and a transgender woman, examining gender identity, stigma, secrecy, and emotional isolation.

The film opened at ReelWorld Film Festival and received coverage from Toronto.com, the Cambridge Times, and the Waterloo Chronicle.

Reviews from Asian Movie Pulse and Rogers Movie Nation highlighted the film’s restrained tone and social context.

=== The Protector (2022) ===
Sivam wrote, directed, and edited the English-language psychological thriller The Protector, blending small-town Canadian realism with elements of South Asian folklore and suspense.

The film screened at the Fantasia International Film Festival in Montreal as part of the 2022 lineup.

In July 2022, Variety reported that Alarm Pictures acquired North American distribution rights to the film following its festival run.

== Themes and style ==
Across his body of work, Sivam’s films consistently engage with themes of displacement, belonging, secrecy, trauma, and cultural conflict within immigrant and diaspora communities. Journalists and critics have noted his focus on everyday domestic spaces, restrained performances, and narratives rooted in social realism rather than spectacle.

== Critical reception ==
Sivam’s films have received coverage from Canadian mainstream media and international film publications, with critics frequently noting his focus on marginalised communities and emotionally restrained storytelling.

== Filmography ==
=== Feature films ===
Year	Title	Credited as			Notes
Year	Title	Director	Writer	Editor	Notes
2009	1999	Yes	Yes	No	
2013	A Gun & a Ring	Yes	Yes	Yes	
2018	Roobha	Yes	Yes	No	
2022	The Protector	Yes	Yes	Yes	

=== Short films ===
- A Few Good People (2006)
- Strength (2007)
- The Next Door (2008)

== Awards and recognition ==
- CBC Audience Choice Award – ReelWorld Film Festival (2010) for 1999.
- Midnight Sun Award – Oslo Tamil Film Festival (2010) for 1999.
- Top 10 Canadian Films – Vancouver International Film Festival (2009) for 1999 (Canadian Images program).
- Golden Goblet Award nomination – Shanghai International Film Festival (2013) for A Gun & a Ring.
- Official Selection – Montreal World Film Festival (2013) for A Gun & a Ring.
- Audience Award – London Tamil Film Festival (2013) for A Gun & a Ring.
- Opening Film – ReelWorld Film Festival (2018) for Roobha.
- Fantasia International Film Festival – Official Selection (2022) for The Protector.
- North American distribution acquisition – Alarm Pictures for The Protector (2022).

== Legacy and impact ==
Sivam is regarded in Canadian and Tamil media as one of a small group of filmmakers bringing Sri Lankan Tamil diaspora experiences to the screen in a Canadian context. Publications such as Canadian Immigrant and NOW Toronto have noted his focus on stories that are rarely depicted in mainstream Canadian cinema, particularly those centred on immigrant family dynamics, identity, and post-war trauma.
