= Roobha =

- Directed by: Lenin M. Sivam
- Written by: Lenin M. Sivam
- Story by: Antonythasan Jesuthasan
- Produced by: Warren Sinnathamby
- Starring: Amrit Sandhu; Antonythasan Jesuthasan; Thenuka Kantharajah, Sornalingam Vyramuthu, Cassandra James, Dan Bertolini, Tharshiny Varapragasam, Bhavani Somasundaram, Ishwaria Chandru
- Cinematography: Arsenij Gusev
- Edited by: Thomas Buschbeck; Rohan Fernando
- Music by: Asif Illyas
- Production company: Next Productions
- Release date: 25 August 2018 (Montreal)
- Running time: 104 minutes
- Country: Canada
- Languages: Tamil; English

Roobha is a 2018 Canadian film directed and written by Lenin M. Sivam. It was produced by Warren Sinnathamby under the banner of Next Productions and stars Amrit Sandhu and Antonythasan Jesuthasan. It is based on a story by Antonythasan Jesuthasan, who writes under the pseudonym Shoba Sakthi. The film explores the harsh realities faced by a young South-Asian trans-woman who struggles to make a living in Toronto after she is ostracized by her family.

Roobha had its world premiere at Montreal World Film Festival on August 25, 2018. It was also the opening film of the 18th Annual Reelworld Film Festival in Toronto, Canada, an Official Selection for the Cambridge Film Festival, Official Selection in the World Panorama Section of the International Film Festival of India in Goa, Official Selection of the Windsor International Film Festival in Canada, Official Selection of the Whistler Film Festival in Canada, London Indian Film Festival in UK, Official Selection of the Melbourne Indian Film Festival in Australia, and Kashish Mumbai International Queer Film Festival.

== Plot ==
Roobha, a trans-woman, struggles to make a living in Toronto after she is ostracized by her family. Her chance encounter with a family man, Anthony, leads to a beautiful romance. However, their blissful existence is short-lived as their families soon discover their relationship.

== Cast ==
- Amrit Sandhu as Roobha, a trans-woman who is ostracized by her family, and faces homophobia as she struggles to make a living .
- Antonythasan Jesuthasan as Anthony, a middle-aged hardworking family man who falls in love with Roobha.
- Thenuka Kantharajah as Pavun, a dedicated homemaker who is shaken to the core when her husband seeks love elsewhere.
- Sornalingam Vairamuthu as Manoharan, a father who is distraught to learn that his son wants to assert his gender as a woman.
- Cassandra James as Lucia, a trans-woman who comes to the aid of Roobha in her hour of need.
- Bhavani Somasundaram as Mani
- Sumathy Balram as Rani
- Dan Bertolini as Maya
- Tharshiny Varapragasam as Mata
- Brian Scott Carleton as Dr. Jefferson
- Tony Cauch as Dr. Finch
- Ishwaria Chandru as Vasuki
- Angela Chrstine as Mai
- Claudio Venditi as Sam
- James Coburn (not to be confused with James Coburn) as Dr. Lawrence
- Gwenlyn Cumyn as Receptionist

== Festivals ==
- Official Selection, Montreal World Film Festival in August, 2018
- Opening Film, Reelworld Film Festival in September, 2018
- Official Selection, Cambridge Film Festival in October, 2018
- Official Selection, Windsor International Film Festival in October, 2018
- Official Selection, International Film Festival of India in November, 2018
- Official Selection, Whistler Film Festival in December, 2018
- Official Selection, London Indian Film Festival in June, 2019
- Official Selection, KASHISH Mumbai International Queer Film Festival in June, 2019
- Official Selection, Indian Film Festival of Melbourne in July, 2019

== Reception ==
A review at That Shelf wrote, "Sivam’s bittersweet love story highlights the best and the worst of what humanity has to offer. The film depicts acts of prejudice, cruelty, and malice that leave you feeling cynical about a better tomorrow. But Roobha also features acts of love, compassion, and selflessness that remind us what makes the world worth saving" while Asian Movie Pulse found " There was a number of scenes where it felt like it could have been better but considering the importance of the way the story is said and the budget, it is an accomplishment the makers could be proud of."
