= White Van Stories =

- Genre: Documentary
- Directed by: Leena Manimekalai

Production
- Running time: 120 Minutes

Original release
- Network: Channel 4

White Van Stories is a documentary by Indian filmmaker Leena Manimekalai for Channel 4 on the long history of enforced disappearances in Sri Lanka. It interviews people who have lost their families, how they cope with the trauma and tragedy, and how they all move along with their lives. It also covers their protest to know about what happened to their relatives.

Leena filmed the historical protests of the families of the disappeared in Jaffna and Colombo who were asking for justice, truth, and reparation, declaring "No Peace" until their loved ones return. She followed seven women who shared their stories across the East, South, and North provinces. Access was incredibly challenging. The North of Sri Lanka was heavily militarized and this is a story that had been largely impenetrable to the media as enforced disappearances also included journalists who were considered even slightly critical of the state and its policies. Ultimately, the film had to be made under severe vigilance and intimidation by the Lankan military. On one occasion, Leena was asked to leave the country and on another, detained for hours of questioning at a check post where they confiscated her tapes and denied her permission to film. The premiere of White Van Stories was broadcast on Channel 4.

"The making of White Van Stories was not a scripted journey. It was rather mystical. Maybe my constant urge to tell stories that otherwise had been forgotten pointed me towards that direction."

— Leena Manimekalai about her documentary White Van Stories on Channel 4
