= Leena Manimekalai =

Film maker, poet, and actor

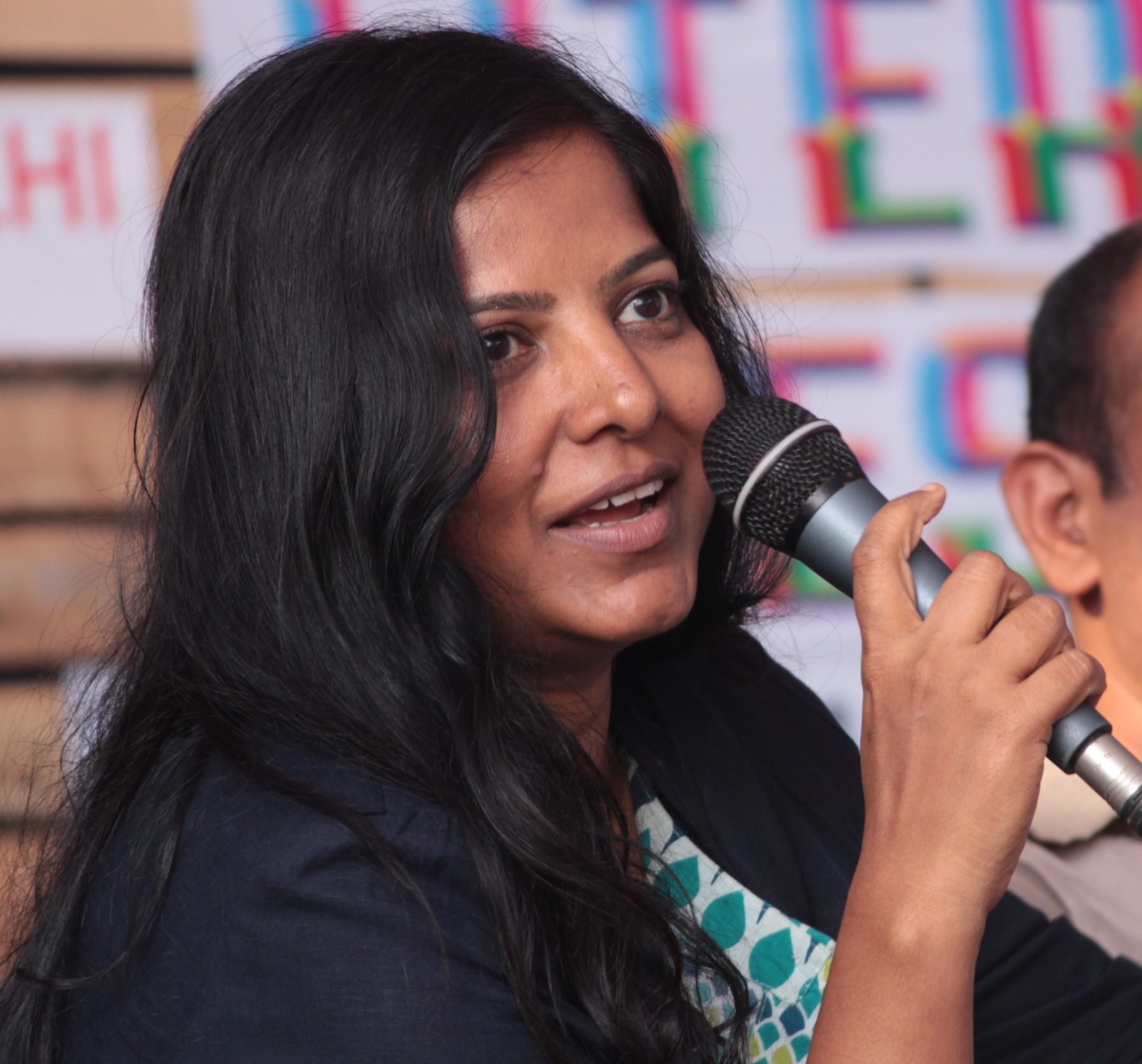
- Website: leenamanimekalai.com

Leena Manimekalai is an Indian filmmaker, poet and an actor. Her works include five published poetry anthologies and several films in genres, documentary, fiction and experimental poem films. She has been recognised with participation, mentions and best film awards in many international and national film festivals.

== Films and activism ==
After a brief period as an assistant director with mainstream filmmakers and an intensive experience as a Television Producer and Anchor, she debuted in 2002 with the short documentary film Mathamma. The 20-minute-long docu-fiction is about devoting girl children to the deity, a practice prevalent among the Arundhatiyar community in Mangattucheri village near Arakkonam, Chennai. Her other films too deal with the issues of the marginalised. Parai is a film on violence against Dalit women. She went on the road with her films across hundreds of villages serving her videos a tool for participatory dialogue with the masses on compelling issues.

Break the Shackles is about the effects of globalisation on rural Tamil villages.

Waves After Waves explores how art rejuvenates the lives of children, devastated by the 2004 tsunami at the coastal villages of Tamil Nadu. Leena was inspired to do this project while she was serving as a volunteer in tsunami-hit regions of Tamil Nadu doing art therapy workshops for children. Altar is a documentary intervention on child marriage customs prevailing in the Kambalathu Naicker community in the central parts of Tamil Nadu. A Hole in the Bucket takes a look at the dynamics of water crisis in the city of Chennai in the context of families with different income levels.

Manimekalai has expressed opposition to censorship in Indian cinema: "CBFC is an archaic institution and it has to go. It is as simple as that. It is such a sore in the skin of democracy. I do not know when filmmakers will realise the very existence of CBFC is an insult to our sensibilities and collectively come together to bring it down. The 1952 Cinematograph Act has to be challenged if we think we are not stupid." Manimekalai's first feature film Sengadal completed production in 2011.

"The making of White Van Stories was not a scripted journey. It was rather mystical. Maybe my constant urge to tell stories that otherwise had been forgotten pointed me towards that direction."

— Leena Manimekalai about her documentary White van stories on Channel 4

Manimekalai's White Van Stories is a 70-minute documentary feature on enforced disappearances in Sri Lanka.

== Personal life ==
Manimekalai is bisexual and came out in her second poetry collection, Ulagin Azhagiya Muthal Penn (The Most Beautiful First Woman in the World).

== Support for LGBT and Pride march ==
"We always have a notion that the metropolises are open to discuss about LGBT than the rural areas. But, it is a false notion. The rural and the tribal people find it easy to share us about the topics that are usually considered taboo by the urban people"

— Leena Manimekalai on Alan Turing Rainbow Festival Organized by Srishti Madurai

Leena Manimekalai along with Anjali Gopalan supported the Asia's first Genderqueer Pride Parade organised by Gopi Shankar Madurai of Srishti Madurai in July 2012. Leena is the author of Antharakanni, the first poetry collection in Tamil on lesbian love. Springing from Tamil folklore, her twilight poems are enchanting with lesbian sensuality. Along with her poems, it has free hand translations of "balaclave" poems of Pussy Riot, the feminist punk band of Russia whose rioters are right now in prison on 'sedition' charges which adds a guerrilla status to the anthology. A Tamil version of openly bisexual Afro American poet June Jordan's cult verse 'About my rights' is another highlight of Antharakanni.

In 2016, she directed a documentary about the troubles faced by two transgender women while they look for a rental apartment in Chennai and the obstacles. It is titled "IS IT TOO MUCH TO ASK?" and was first screened on 21 November 2016, and later many other film festivals all over the world.

== Filmography ==
=== Director ===
| Year | Title | Category |
|---|---|---|
| 2003 | Mathamma | Documentary |
| 2004 | Parai | Documentary |
| 2004 | Break the Shackles | Documentary |
| 2004 | Love Lost | Video Poem |
| 2005 | Connecting Lines | Documentary |
| 2005 | Altar | Documentary |
| 2006 | Waves After Waves | Documentary |
| 2007 | A Hole in the Bucket | Documentary |
| 2008 | Goddesses | Documentary |
| 2011 | Sengadal | Feature Fiction |
| 2012 | My Mirror is the Door | Video Poem |
| 2012 | Ballad of Resistance | Video Portrait |
| 2013 | White Van Stories | Documentary |
| 2017 | Is it too much to Ask | Documentary |
| 2021 | Maadathy | Feature film |
| 2022 | Kaali | Documentary film |

=== Actor ===
| Year | Title | Role | Director | Length | Category |
|---|---|---|---|---|---|
| 2004 | Chellamma | Protagonist | Sivakumar | 90 mins | Feature fiction |
| 2005 | Love Lost | Protagonist | Leena Manimekalai | 5 mins | Video Poem |
| 2004 | The White Cat | Female Protagonist | Sivakumar | 10 mins | Short Fiction |
| 2011 | Sengadal the Dead Sea | Female Protagonist | Leena Manimekalai | 102 mins | Feature Fiction |

== Publications ==
=== Poem collections ===
| Year | Original Title | English Title |
|---|---|---|
| 2003 | Ottrailaiyena | As a Lone Leaf |
| 2009 | Ulakin Azhakiya Muthal Penn | The First Beautiful Woman in the World |
| 2011 | Parathaiyarul Raani | Queen of Sluts |
| 2012 | Antharakanni | – |
| 2016 | Chichili | – |

== Awards and achievements ==
- 2004: Retro – Ethnographic Montages, Chicago Women in Director's Chair International Film Festival
- 2004: Silver Trophy for the Best Documentary in Europe Movies Film Festival
- 2005: Best Actor and Best Experimental Video in Independent Art Film Festival
- 2005: Best Documentary in Paris and Norway Independent Diaspora Festivals
- 2005: European Union Fellowship for Conflict Resolution in Media
- 2005: Retrospective, International Democratic Socialist Youth Film Festival, Venezuela
- 2006: International Jury in Asian Film Festival, Malaysia
- 2007: Jury Award for Best Cinema of Resistance – John Abraham National Award
- 2008: Golden Conch for Best International Documentary in Mumbai International Film Festival
- 2008: Visiting Scholar Fellowship, Berlinale
- 2008: Nomination to Horizon Award, Munich International Film Festival
- 2008: Nomination – Asia Pacific Screen Awards, Brisbane
- 2008: One Billion Eyes National Award – Best Documentary
- 2008: Commonwealth Scholarship and Fellowship Plan, Birds Eye View Film Festival, London
- 2008: Iyal Best Poetry Award from The Tamil Literary Garden for Ulakin Azhakiya Muthal Penn
- 2011: Sirpi Literary Award for the contribution to Tamil Poetry
- 2011: Indian Panorama Selections for Sengadal
- 2011: NAWFF Award for Best Asian Women Cinema (Tokyo) – Sengadal
- 2012: As Jury, International Women Film Festival, Seoul.
- 2013: Lenin Award from Thamizh Studio (instituted in the name of film editor B. Lenin) who highlights social issues.
- 2014: Srishti Tamil Lambda Literary Award for her book "Antharakanni" conferred by Bracha Ettinger and Anjali Gopalan Advisory Board of Srishti Madurai
- 2015: L’Oreal Paris Femina Women Awards 2015

== Row over Kaali poster ==
Leena Manimekalai was on the receiving end of significant backlash and threats of violence after posting an image of the Hindu goddess Kaali as a poster for her documentary film Kaali on her twitter account. The image contained a picture of Manimekalai in costume as the goddess Kali smoking a cigarette with the rainbow gay pride flag. Canada’s Aga Khan Museum, where the film had been presented once on 2 July, issued a statement expressing regret that the tweet "inadvertently caused offence".

== See also ==
- List of Indian documentary filmmakers

== Sources ==
- Abdul Latheef Naha (30 July 2006). "Giving voice to the voiceless". The Hindu. Chennai, India. Archived from the original on 19 March 2008.
- S. R. Ashok Kumar (2 November 2007). "Filled by poignant images". The Hindu. Archived from the original on 4 November 2007.
- S. R. Ashok Kumar (14 April 2006). "With social change as goal". The Hindu. Chennai, India. Archived from the original on 10 May 2006.
- P. Oppili (22 September 2005). "A documentary on students and politics". The Hindu. Archived from the original on 7 December 2005.
