= Antonythasan Jesuthasan =

Shobasakthi

- அந்தோனிதாசன் யேசுதாசன்
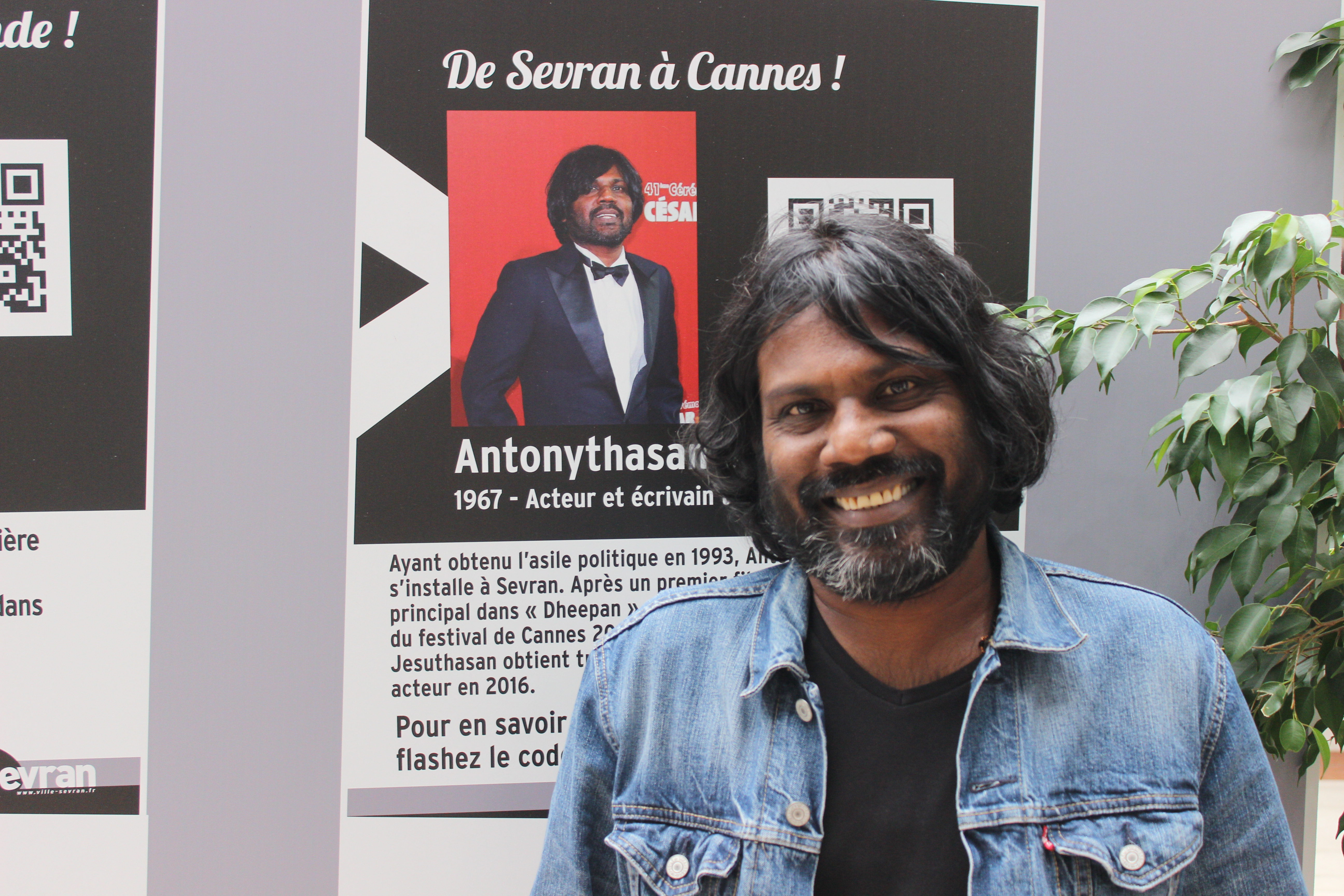
- Jesuthasan in September 2018
- Born: Antonythasan Jesuthasan; 1967 (age 58–59); Allaipiddy, Jaffna District, Northern Province, Dominion of Ceylon (now Sri Lanka)
- Other name: Shobasakthi
- Citizenship: Sri Lankan (1967-89)
- Occupations: Author, actor
- Website: shobasakthi.com

Antonythasan Jesuthasan (Tamil: அந்தோனிதாசன் யேசுதாசன்; born 1967), also known by the pseudonym Shobasakthi (Tamil: ஷோபா சக்தி), is a Sri Lankan Tamil author and actor.

== Early life and family ==
Jesuthasan was born in 1967. He is originally from the village of Allaipiddy on the island of Velanaitivu in northern Sri Lanka. Appalled by the Black July anti-Tamil riots, Jesuthasan joined the militant Liberation Tigers of Tamil Eelam (LTTE) as a "helper" when he was around 15 or 16. He became a full-time member of the LTTE in 1984, receiving training locally and taking on the noms de guerre "Thasan" and "Buckle". A natural artist, Jesuthasan took part in the LTTE's 1985 street drama Vidduthalaikaali (Liberation Kali).

Jesuthasan became disillusioned with the LTTE and left the organisation in December 1986 for which he received the customary punishment. After the Indo-Lanka Accord was signed in July 1987 Jesuthasan moved to the capital Colombo. However, when war broke out between the LTTE and the Indian Peace Keeping Force, Jesuthasan was arrested in Colombo for being a LTTE member. He was released once the peace talks between the LTTE and the Premadasa government started.

In 1988 Jesuthasan, aged 19, travelled to Hong Kong, the only place he could go to without a visa. He stayed at the Chungking Mansions for six months before moving to Thailand with the help of the UNHCR, living as a refugee in a suburb of Bangkok. Unable to find fake British or Canadian passports, Jesuthasan, his brother and sister obtained fake French passports from a Frenchman and travelled to France in 1993 where they were granted political asylum.

In August 1990 the Sri Lanka Army invaded Allaipiddy as they tried to recapture Jaffna Fort. Around 85 youths were rounded up by the army and never heard of again. According to Jesuthasan amongst them were 23 of his relatives who were killed by the army and their bodies thrown into a well. Jesuthasan's parents fled by boat to Madras, India in 1990 after the Sri Lanka Navy took over Allaipiddy and turned it into a naval base.

== Career ==
Jesuthasan had various low-paid jobs in Paris including stacking shelves in supermarkets, cooking, dish washing, street sweeping, labouring, construction work and working as a bellhop at Euro Disney. He became involved in left-wing politics, joining the Revolutionary Communist Organization of which he was a member for four years. He severed all connections with the LTTE and started campaigning, along with his leftist friends, against the Sri Lankan Civil War and the numerous atrocities and human rights abuses committed by the Sri Lankan government and the LTTE.

During his time in the Revolutionary Communist Organization, Jesuthasan's friends introduced him to literature. In the late 1990s Jesuthasan started writing, under the pseudonym Shobasakthi, short stories, plays, political essays and novels about his personal experiences during the civil war. His first novel Gorilla (2001) was based in his own experience as a child soldier in the LTTE. Gorilla was translated into English in 2008. His second novel Traitor (2003) was based on the 1983 massacre of political prisoners in Sri Lanka. Traitor was translated into English in 2010.

Jesuthasan's acting career started in 2011 when he wrote and starred in Sengadal (The Dead Sea), a film about Tamil fishermen struggling to make a living in the largely abandoned village of Dhanushkodi in southern India. The film was initially banned in India after the Chennai Regional Censor Board refused to rate the film. After a legal battle the film was given an "Adult" rating by the censor.

Jesuthasan starred in Dheepan, which won the Palme d'Or at the 2015 Cannes Film Festival, in 2015. The film tells the story of Dheepan (Jesuthasan), a former LTTE member, who claims political asylum in France by finding a woman and girl to pose as his wife and daughter. According to Jesuthasan the film was 50% autobiographical.

Despite the civil war having ended in May 2009 with the military defeat of the LTTE, Jesuthasan does not feel it's safe for him to return to Sri Lanka because of the continuing "armed attacks against minorities" and unknown fate of LTTE members taken prisoner by the Sri Lankan military.

When Jesuthasan traveled to Canada for the Toronto International Film Festival's screening of Dheepan, he was questioned about his past with the Tamil Tigers. He was allowed to attend the festival, but he said the authorities kept his travel document at the airport, handing it back only when he left.

== Works ==
Year	Title	Publisher
2001	Gorilla	Adaiyalam
2003	Thesathuroki	Adaiyalam
2004	Mm	Karuppu Piradhigal
2007	Veelaikarikalin Puthagam	Karuppu Piradhigal
2009	M.G.R. Kolai Valakku	Karuppu Piradhigal
2010	Por Innum Oyavillai	Karuppu Piradhigal
2010	Nan Eppothu Adimayaiyirunthen	Karuppu Piradhigal
2011	Panchathukku Puli	Karuppu Piradhigal
2014	Muppathu Nira Sol	Karuppu Piradhigal
2014	Evaraluum Katpanai Seiya Mudiyatha Nan	Karuppu Piradhigal
2014	Kandy Veeran	Karuppu Piradhigal
2015	Box	Karuppu Piradhigal
2017	Shoba - Itinéraire d'un réfugié (co-author: Clémentine V, Baron)	Le Livre de Poche
2019	Ichaa	Karuppu Piradhigal
2021	Moumin	Karuppu Piradhigal
2022	Salam Alaik	Karuppu Piradhigal
2022	Karung Kuil	Karuppu Piradhigal
2024	Yuththa Thooshanam	Karuppu Piradhigal

== Translated works ==
Year	Title	Publisher
2008	Gorilla (English translation by Anushiya Ramaswamy)	Random House
2010	Traitor (English translation by Anushiya Ramaswamy)	Penguin
2014	The MGR Murder Trial (English translation by Anushiya Ramaswamy	Penguin
2018	Friday et Friday (French translation by Faustine Imbert-Vier, Élisabeth Sethupathy and Farhaan Wahab)	Zulma
2021	La sterne rouge (French translation by Léticia Ibanez)	Zulma

== Filmography ==
=== Feature films ===
Year	Title	Role	Notes
2011	Sengadal	Sivanandhan	Also co-writer
2015	Dheepan	Dheepan / Sivadhasan	
2018	Roobha	Antony	Also story writer
2018	Paris Pigalle	Hakim	
2018	Friday And Friday	Friday	Also co-writer
2018	A Private War	Thamilselvan	
2019	Casanova, Last Love	Jarba	
2020	BAC Nord	Tamilian	
2022	Notre-Dame on Fire	Jonas	
2022	Woman at Sea	Jesus	
2023	Princes of the Desert	Kumail	
2024	Her and Him and the Rest of the World	Phone repairer	
2024	Sorgavaasal	Seelan	

=== Other works ===
Year	Title	Role	Notes
2017	Unlock	Appa	short film
2017	Little Jaffna	Sathya	short film
2017	Threesome	Shoba	short film
2018	Paris métèque	rose seller	music video
2019	Counting and Cracking	Thirru	play
2020	The Loyal Man	Iya	short film
2021	Coyotes	Amine	TV Series
2022	Dilemme Dilemme	Indian	short film
2022	Appa	Appa	short film
2023	Sans Contact	Mahendra	short film
2023	Men In Blue	Vijayan	short film
