= The Protector (2022 film) =

2022 Canadian thriller film

- Directed by: Lenin M. Sivam
- Written by: Lenin M. Sivam
- Produced by: Munire Armstrong; Brandon Jourdin
- Starring: Chelsea Clark; Rebecca Jenkins; Andrew Gillies; Munro Chambers; Jasmin Geljo; Pras Lingam
- Cinematography: Kalinga Deshapriya
- Edited by: Lenin M. Sivam
- Music by: Kalaisan Kalaichelvan
- Production company: Bagavan Productions
- Distributed by: Alarm Pictures (international sales) and levelFILM (Canada)
- Release date: 28 July 2022; (Fantasia International Film Festival)
- Running time: 94 minutes
- Country: Canada
- Language: English

The Protector is a 2022 Canadian suspense thriller film written, directed and edited by Lenin M. Sivam and produced by Munire Armstrong. The film stars Chelsea Clark as a young woman on probation in a seemingly crime-free small town, alongside Rebecca Jenkins, Andrew Gillies, Munro Chambers, Jasmin Geljo and Pras Lingam. Blending Canadian small-town drama with elements of South Asian folklore and magical realism, the story centres on a mysterious book about a god known as "the Protector" and the violent secrets the town is hiding.

The film was shot in and around Sault Ste. Marie, Ontario during the winter of 2021. It had its world premiere at the 2022 Fantasia International Film Festival in Montreal, and subsequently screened at genre and independent festivals in North America, Europe and Asia, including opening-night slots at the Blood in the Snow Film Festival in Toronto and the Sault Ste. Marie International Film Festival, and the closing-night gala at the Jaffna International Cinema Festival in Sri Lanka. According to the University of Jaffna, the film later garnered the Best Feature Film Award at the Canal de Panama International Film Festival.

After its festival run, The Protector was picked up for North American sales and distribution by Alarm Pictures, and was released on Canadian digital platforms by levelFILM in February 2023, followed by availability on Amazon Prime Video and other VOD services in Canada and the United States. Critics generally praised the film’s premise, folklore elements and performances—particularly Clark’s lead turn—while offering more mixed views on its narrative and tonal execution.

== Plot ==
After serving ten years in a juvenile detention centre for a violent incident she maintains was an accident, Evelyn is released on probation into the custody of Dr. Flora, a strict psychiatrist who arranges for her to live and work in the small Northern Ontario town of Wilfred. The town has an uncanny reputation: it has been statistically free of crime for a decade, and the local police chief Gordon insists that Wilfred is “protected” and safe for everyone who follows the rules.

Trying to rebuild her life, Evelyn takes a job at a local deli and slowly begins to form a connection with her co-worker Eloah. She struggles with intrusive memories of her past and with the close surveillance imposed by Gordon and Flora, who monitor her behaviour and movements.

On her birthday, Evelyn receives an anonymous package containing a strange religious book. The text describes a god known as “The Protector”, a powerful being who can be invited to bring peace and prosperity to a specific place in exchange for strict obedience and sacrifice from its inhabitants. As Evelyn becomes obsessed with the book, she starts to notice oddities and inconsistencies in the town’s history, including unexplained disappearances and unreported crimes.

Convinced that Wilfred’s apparent harmony hides a violent bargain, Evelyn begins investigating the town’s past and the origins of the “Protector” myth. Her search draws the attention of a mysterious stranger connected to the book and deepens the conflict between her and the authorities tasked with supervising her. As her mental state deteriorates and reality increasingly blurs with the book’s mythology, Evelyn must decide whether confronting the truth is worth risking her newfound freedom and the fragile safety of the people around her.

== Cast ==
- Chelsea Clark as Evelyn
- Rebecca Jenkins as Dr. Flora
- Andrew Gillies as Chief Gordon
- Munro Chambers as Eloah
- Pras Lingam as Bhairava
- Jasmin Geljo

== Production ==
=== Development and inspiration ===
Sivam has described The Protector as an attempt to combine his lifelong fascination with Hindu mythology—especially the god Bhairava, whom he encountered at a temple near his childhood village in northern Sri Lanka—with his admiration for the suspense films of Alfred Hitchcock. He conceived the story as a small-town thriller in which a secular Canadian setting gradually reveals a supernatural and moral logic drawn from South Asian folklore.

In an essay about the film, Sivam wrote that he wanted to create a modern heroine who is “determined and resilient” but constrained by bureaucracy and institutional power, and to explore how ideas about protection and sacrifice can be used to justify both safety and violence.

=== Pre-production and filming ===
According to production listings, principal photography on The Protector took place over several weeks in early 2021, with the film officially listed as in pre-production by April 2021. The production was based in Sault Ste. Marie, Ontario, using the city and surrounding area to portray the fictional town of Wilfred.

Local film office material and subsequent press coverage note that the feature was one of a number of independent genre projects shot in the region during that period, highlighting Northern Ontario’s growing role as a stand-in for small-town and rural settings in Canadian film and television.

Cinematographer Kalinga Deshapriya, composer Kalaisan Kalaichelvan and sound designer Bret Killoran were all credited in festival materials, with Sivam also serving as the film’s editor. Sivam had previously collaborated with Deshapriya on the features A Gun & A Ring and Roobha.

== Release ==
=== Festival run ===
The Protector held its world premiere at the 2022 Fantasia International Film Festival in Montreal, as part of the festival’s Septentrion Shadows section, with screenings on 28 July and 1 August 2022. It was subsequently programmed in the Features Canada section of the 2022 Cinéfest Sudbury International Film Festival.

The film was selected as the opening-night feature of the Blood in the Snow Film Festival (BITS) in Toronto, and also opened the Sault Ste. Marie International Film Festival. In Sri Lanka it served as the closing film of the eighth Jaffna International Cinema Festival, as reported by local press and the University of Jaffna’s Department of Media Studies.

In the United States, The Protector screened at the Philadelphia Asian American Film Festival (PAAFF) in November 2022, accompanied by a virtual Q&A with Sivam and members of the cast.

In the Caribbean, The Protector was named an official selection of the LUSCA Fantastic Film Fest in Puerto Rico, with Caribbean Cinemas listing the feature as part of its Lusca programme. In 2023 it was included among the feature selections of the Global Tourism Film Festival (GTFF) in North Bay, Ontario, where trade coverage highlighted the film as a Northern Ontario–shot feature.

=== Distribution and streaming ===
Alarm Pictures acquired North American rights to The Protector from Hewes Pictures ahead of the Fantasia premiere, with levelFILM handling Canadian release. The film was released on Canadian transactional platforms in February 2023, including Apple TV, Google Play and major cable VOD services, and became available for streaming on Amazon Prime Video in Canada and the United States later that month.

== Reception ==
=== Critical response ===
Reviewing the film at Fantasia, Jon Mendelsohn of CBR praised Chelsea Clark’s performance and the central concept but concluded that The Protector “offers an extremely intriguing premise” without fully exploring its themes. Edgar Chaput of Tilt similarly commended the ambition of its blend of mythology and thriller elements while describing its execution as uneven, arguing that the film “has good ideas but messy execution”.

Canadian outlet In The Seats highlighted the film’s visual atmosphere and the originality of its mythological framing, writing that Sivam “paints outside the box” in his approach to genre, while noting that the narrative structure might divide audiences.

== Festivals ==
The following is a selection of festival screenings for The Protector:

Year	Festival	Location	Notes	Ref.
2022	Fantasia International Film Festival	Montreal, Canada	World premiere; Septentrion Shadows section	
2022	Cinéfest Sudbury International Film Festival	Sudbury, Ontario, Canada	Features Canada programme	
2022	Blood in the Snow Film Festival	Toronto, Ontario, Canada	Opening-night film	
2022	Sault Ste. Marie International Film Festival	Sault Ste. Marie, Ontario, Canada	Opening film of the festival	
2022	Jaffna International Cinema Festival	Jaffna, Sri Lanka	Closing film of the 8th edition	
2022	Philadelphia Asian American Film Festival	Philadelphia, Pennsylvania, United States	Official selection with director Q&A	
2022	LUSCA Fantastic Film Fest	San Juan, Puerto Rico	Official selection	
2022	Canal de Panama International Film Festival	Panama City, Panama	Official selection; later received Best Feature Film Award	
2023	Global Tourism Film Festival	North Bay, Ontario, Canada	Official selection; Northern Ontario–shot feature	

== Awards ==
Year	Festival	Award	Category	Result	Ref.
2022	Canal de Panama International Film Festival	Best Feature Film Award	The Protector	Won	
