= Allaippiddi =

Allaippiddi அல்லைப்பிட்டி අලපිටිය
- Village
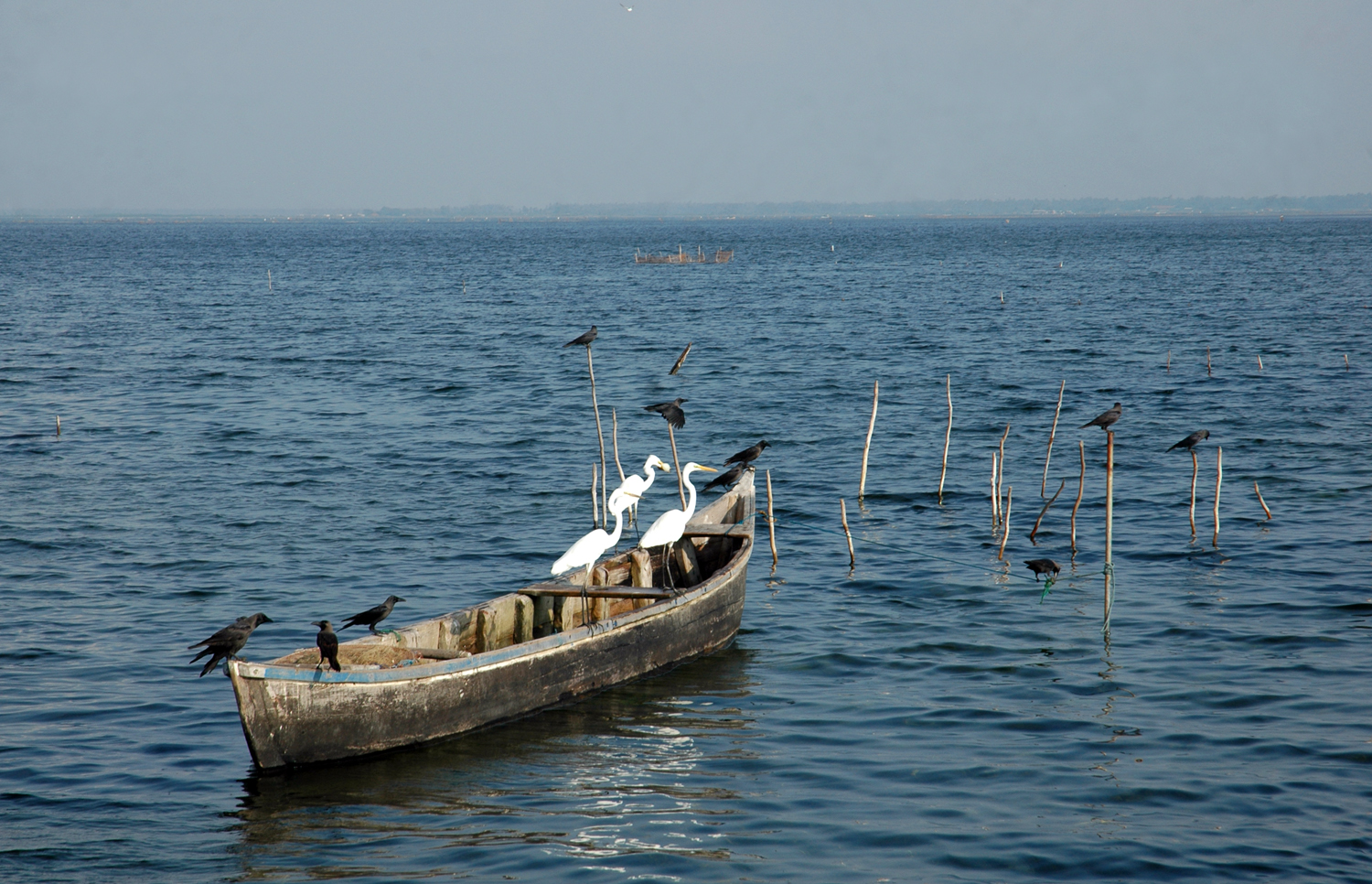

- Location within Northern Province
- Coordinates: 9°37′0″N 79°58′0″E
- Country: Sri Lanka
- Province: Northern Province
- District: Jaffna District
- DS Division: Islands South

Allaippiddi or Allaipiddy (Tamil: அல்லைப்பிட்டி, Sinhala: අලපිටිය Alapitiya) is a village on Velanai Island off the coast of the Jaffna Peninsula in Sri Lanka’s Northern Province.

== Geography ==
Allaipiddy is strategically located on the causeway from Jaffna via the Pannai bridge. After Mandaitivu, past the abandoned aluminium factory, lies a Sri Lanka Navy garrison approximately 500 m from Allaipiddy.

== Demography ==
Most residents of the village are Sri Lankan Tamils and the majority are Roman Catholics. The population was estimated at around 800 in May 2006, and at least 150 residents fled the village after the Allaipiddy massacre of 13 May 2006.

== Notable residents ==
- Antonythasan Jesuthasan, author and actor, was born in Allaipiddy.
