= Varrun Sukhraj =

Indian writer and director

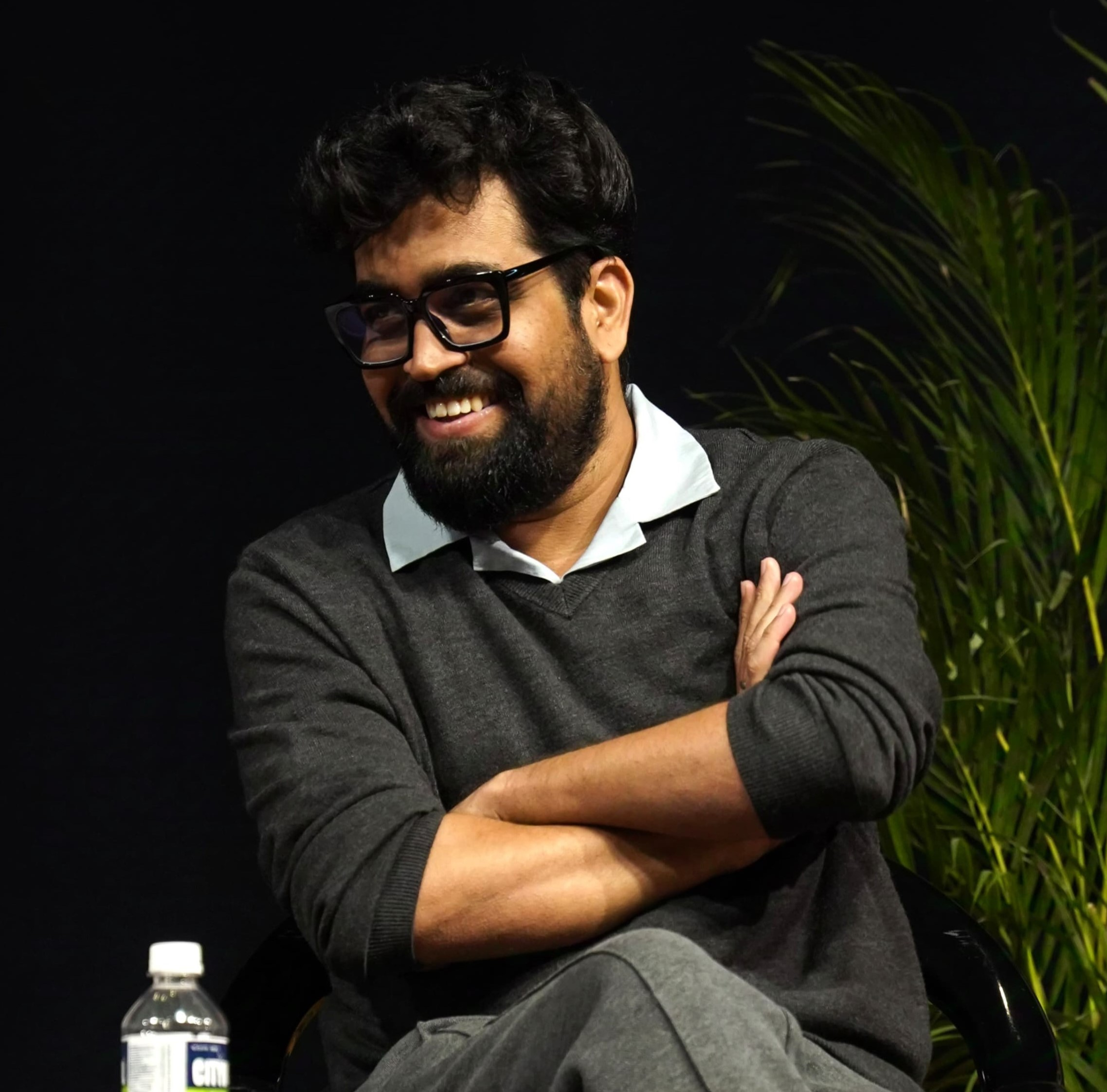
- Citizenship: Indian
- Occupation: Film Director
- Years active: 2016-present
- Spouse: Sneha Desai
- Awards: The Peabody Award

Varrun Sukhraj (16 June 1988) is an Indian writer and director. He is known for his acclaimed documentary "Too Much Democracy" (2022), based on Indian farmers' protest in 2020. Which screened at The International Documentary and Short Film Festival of Kerala. He is also known for his sensitive filmmaking style that raises awareness of critical societal issues through his films and storytelling.

== Early life and career ==
Varrun was born in a business family, and grew up in Khed, Ratnagiri, he later moved to Pune city for his higher studies. In 2016, he founded his own production house in Mumbai and directed his first TV series, Naammatra which was focused on farmer suicides in Maharashtra.

In 2022, His documentary Film Too Much Democracy was released, based on 2020–2021 Indian farmers' protest. The protest saw farmers marching towards Delhi to oppose the new farm bills introduced by the Government of India.

In 2024, He collaborated with stand-up comedians Kunal Kamra and Shyam Rangeela on the film titled Jamoora (Jester), which was released in India in October 2024.

His upcoming project, a biographical film on the life of Chhatrapati Rajarshi Shahu, a revolutionary Indian king from the early British era.

== Filmography ==
Year	Film	Notes
2018	Naammatra	
2022	Too Much Democracy	
2024	Jamoora	
2026	The Great Indian Illusion	
2026	Ulfat	
TBA	Shahu Chhatrapati	
