= Shriprakash =

Shriprakash (born 23 December 1966) is an Indian activist and independent documentary filmmaker.

== Biography ==
Shriprakash was born in December 1966 from a family of farmers in the state of Bihar, in an area that in 2000 became a separate state called Jharkhand. He graduated in Science and Journalism from University and soon became interested in video as an activist medium. With his films he has attempted to capture the struggles and aspirations of indigenous local communities in Bihar and Jharkhand, and to give them a voice. "I do not impose my views," he explains. "I am only the instrument that takes the camera to the place of struggle. It's the people participating in the struggle who actually make the film. They live out their lives and voice their concerns in their own words. I only record."

Shriprakash has directed and produced many documentary films during the last 15 years. He is also the chief co-ordinator of Kritika, a group working in the Jharkhand region since 1990 in the areas of culture and communication. He only uses his first name as a protest for the Indian caste system, which discriminates depending on the caste one belongs to, since family names in India indicate the caste of the family.

== Filmography ==
=== The fire within (Buru Sengal) (2002) ===
Length: 57 min.
Original language: Hindi and Santhali
Synopsis: A film about the socio-political, ecological impact of the 150-year-old Indian coal industry in the Jharkhand region.
Synopsis from Indymedia India: Circa 1775 the first coal mine was blasted in the Raniganj area. The indigenous people owned this coal rich land till the British dispossessed them. Since the 19th century, specially the World Wars and after, the railways were introduced and large-scale coal extraction began. These mine were owned by the private parties, who were engaged by ruthless exploiting the nature /human resource. Then came our tryst with destiny, and the story counties without any twist. 25 years after the independence- the Coal industry was nationalised and the situation worsened as the Mafia and corrupt bureaucrat ushered in an era of violent culture. Today, while approximately Rs. 10 billion goes to the government as royalty from the black diamond, four to five thousand crores is siphoned away as black money from the coal industry. The people, who owned these lands, are left to languish as no one talks about their plight. No rehabilitation, no compensation, no jobs. River Damodar is the most polluted river today. The open mine literally on fire; there is no water and the land has turned totally infertile. From being owners of land the indigenous people are forced to turn into coal stealers in the eyes of the law. The Fire Within draws a painful portrait of the transformation of the land of the Tana Bhagats; a sect of the oraon tribe who were believers of non-violence and Ganghian philosophy to a land witnessing violent Naxalite movement today. At the same time it talks about the mafia, corruption, the energy politics, – how a peaceful area is declared a disturbed area. Now the whole area is under control of under ground Maoist gorilla groups. The land of the Tana Bhagats, a peaceful sect of the Oraon tribe who follow a Gandhian lifestyle and philosophy, is today besieged by Naxalite violence. In tracing the impact of the underground Maoist guerrillas, the film touches upon corruption, the mafia, energy politics and displacement of villages, and tribal identity in an area where coal has been mined for the last 150 years.
Awards: Best Film Award, XVIII Black International Cinema, 2003. Grand Jury Award, Film South Asia ’03. Special Jury Mention, Earth-Vision Film Festival 2002 Film Festival in Asian Social Forum, 2003, Hyderabad 9th Energy Film Festival, Lausanne, 2003 Documentary Film Festival, Istanbul, 2003

=== Buddha Weeps in Jadugoda (1999) ===
Length: 76 min.
Original language: Hindi
Synopsis: Jadugoda is an area in the state of Bihar populated by Adivasi (tribal peoples of India). It first came into prominence when uranium deposits were discovered in the area, since Jadugoda is India's only underground uranium mine. The film documents the devastating effects of uranium mining by Uranium Corporation of India Limited in Jadugoda. For the last thirty years, the radioactive wastes have been just dumped into the rice fields of the Adivasis. The government agency mining the uranium makes no attempt to protect the lives of the people and environment of the area. The unsafe mining of uranium has resulted in excessive radiation which has led to genetic mutations and slow deaths. Medical reports reveal that the impact of radiation on the health of tribal peoples has already been devastating. The film is an attempt to record the tragedy that has played havoc with the lives of the people of Jadugoda.

=== Do not I have the right to live? (1998) ===
Original language: Hindi
Length: 52 min.
Synopsis: The story of a woman displaced by a coal mine.

=== Another revolt (Addo Miyad Ulgulan) (1995) ===
Original language: Hindi
Length: 40 min.
Synopsis: The film shows the struggle against the Koel Karo hydel project in Jharkhand, which threatened the lives and livelihood of thousands of tribals living in the area.

=== Serenj Sakub (1995) ===
Original language: Mundari
Length: 10 min.
Synopsis: A docudrama on the Birsa movement.

=== In whose defence (Kiski Raksha) (1994) ===
Original language: Hindi
Length: 52 min.
Synopsis: Controversial film on the tribal movement in the Netrahat region against the army's decision to extend its firing range into land and forests occupied by the people. The film captures the spirit and determination shown by tribals, drawn from 245 villages in Jharkhand, in opposing the government's plans to extend an army firing range in the forest area of Netrahat that they have occupied for centuries. The people's movement forced the army to abandon its plans.

=== Beyond Imposed Identities (Aaropit Pahchan ke Paar) ===
Co-director and camera person.
Length: 30 min.
Synopsis: Musahars, often referred to as Dalits among Dalits, are at the bottom-rung of society in the Gangetic plains. Descendants of a Chhotanagpur tribe, Musahars are scattered all over the paddy-growing plains, providing the so-called un-skilled labour. The film captures the everyday life, the day-to-day struggle of Musahars. Aware of plural voices among the community, the film deals with the question of emancipation and the importance of Musahar legends, myth and tradition in seeking that emancipation. It also focuses on the contrasting views on Musahars' association with the pig and liquor. The voices of self-assertion mark the narrative of the film that shatters the centuries-old, and incessant, myth about the Musahar as a rat-eating community.

Screening and awardsScreening and awards

Film	Year	Award(s)	Screening
	2018	Lifetime achievement award (By international Uranium Film Festival Rio, Brazil for working in issue of Uranium mining and it's impacts on human and environment for more than 2 decades and also worked in 3 countries)	Window Rock Arizona, USA, International Travelling Uranium Film Festival
Kis Ki Raksha? (In Whose Defence?)	1994		· International Video Film Festival, Thiruvananthapuram, 1994 · Video Film Festival, Buenos Aires, 1995 · Prakriti Film Festival, [University Grants Commission-Consortium for Educational Communication] 1997
Addo Miyad Ulgulan (Another Revolt)	1995		· Mumbai International Film Festival, 1996 · Video Film Festival, Buenos Aires, 1996
Ragi Kana Ko Bonga Buru (Buddha Weeps in Jadugoda)	1999	· Earth-Vision International Film Festival, Tokyo, 2000 (Grand Prize) Vermont Film Festival, USA, 2001 · Thunder Bird Film Festival, USA, 2001 (Best Film Award) · Film South Asia-Kathmandu, 1999 (Third Best Film Award) · Earth-Vision Environmental Film Festival, CA, USA, 2002 (Runner-up)	· Hong Kong Film Festival, 2000 · Mumbai International Film Festival, 2000 · International Film Festival, Istanbul, 2001 · United Nations Association Film Festival, USA, 2000 · Broadcast by NHK-Japan and Free Speech TV, USA, 2001
Buru Sengal (The Fire Within)	2002	· Earth-Vision Film Festival 2002, USA (Special Jury Mention) · XVIII Black International Cinema, Berlin, 2003(Best Film) · Film South Asia, Kathmandu 2003 (Jury Mention)	· Film Festival in Asian Social Forum, 2003 Hyderabad · Documentary Film Festival, Istanbul, 2003 ·
Buru Gaara (Pahari Nadi)		Best Film on Social Issues - 56TH National Films Award 2008	· Film Fest on Women: Jamia Millia University, New Delhi, 2007. · Subaltern Fest by Public Service Broadcasting Trust, New Delhi- 2007. · Black International Cinema, Berlin, 2008 · Tribal International Film Festival, Indore, 2008. · Manipal University, Dept. of Mass Communications, 2008. · VISCULT FILM FESTIVAL, Finland 2011 · SIIRRETYT- SIEMENPUU INTERNATIONAL FILM FESTIVAL, Finland 2011
Jadugoda – The Black Magic	2007		· Royal School of Medicine, London, and IPPNW Meeting. · 18th World Congress of IPPNW, New Delhi, 2008 · Uranium Film Festival, Rio 2012
Baha (The Tale of A Wild Flower)- Fiction	2008	· Special filmmaker award in XXIV.Black International Cinema- Berlin /Germany & U.S.A.-2009 · Best Film and Best Director awards in First Santhali and Regional Language film festival – Tatanagar, - 2010	· SIIRRETYT- SIEMENPUU INTERNATIONAL FILM FESTIVAL, Finland 2011
Delayed Justice	2009		· Vibgyor film Festival, Kerala, 2010 · SIIRRETYT- SIEMENPUU INTERNATIONAL FILM FESTIVAL, Finland 2011
EER- Stories in Stone	2011		· SIIRRETYT- SIEMENPUU INTERNATIONAL FILM FESTIVAL, Finland 2011
Hul Sengal Aguwa (Unsung Heroes of Hul)	2012		· International Indigenous Film festival, Kathmandu 2013
Nabikei	2017		International Travelling Uranium film festival, 2018 (Window Rock, Arizona, Grant -New Mexico, Albuquerque, New Mexico) The world nuclear victim forum, Hiroshima- 2015 Multi-Cultural Center theatre, University of California, St. Barbara 2018 Imagine India · Spain 2018 Mumbai · TISS Mumbai, 2019 · St. Xavier, Mumbai, 2019 · Bombay Press Club, 2019 Hyderabad · IIT Hyderabad · Shoib hall, SVK, Baghlingampally, Hyderabad, 2019 · Somajiguda press club, 2019 · Laamakaan, Banjara hills, Hyderabad, 2019
Keemat Chukati Zindagi			CET Film Festival, Kerala, 2020 (in association with Minimal Cinema) 13th International Documentary and Short film festival, Kerala (IDSFFK)
