= Maga.Tamizh Prabhagaran =

Tamil Prabhakaran is an Indian Tamil journalist and documentary film maker.

== Career ==
=== Early career ===
He went to War zones of Sri Lanka in 2012. During this time, he was investigated by a group of Sri Lankan Army officials in Elephant pass. After he returned to India, he wrote a series articles titled as 'Pulithadam Thedi'(A Journey of 25 days in bloodstain Lanka) in Junior Vikatan, a leading Tamil magazine.

=== Book ===
The series which published on Junior Vikatan, later published as a book. It is a one of a kind first-hand account on post-war situations of Sri Lanka.

=== Interview of Irom Sharmila ===
In November 2013, he took a case against the Manipur government regarding the arbitrary restrictions to meet Irom Sharmila, who had been on a hunger strike, protesting against the Armed Forces (Special Powers) Act, 1958 for about 13 years. After twenty days of legal battle, he finally met Sharmila. The Manipur High Court passed an order directing the authorities concerned to grant him permission to meet Sharmila, according to Assam Jail Manual which is also applicable to Manipur.

=== Arrest in Sri Lanka ===
In December 2013, he went to Sri Lanka second time. On his fifth day of visit (25 December 2013), he was arrested by Sri Lankan Army. After he was detained for three days in Colombo by Terrorist Investigation Department. During his arrest, Tamil Nadu was shock, and gave voice for his release. New York based Journalist group 'Committee to Protect Journalists' also condemned his arrest. Dravida Munnetra Kazhagam leader Kalaignar Karunanidhi, Marumalarchi Dravida Munnetra Kazhagam leader Vaiko, Viduthalai Chiruthaigal Katchi leader Thol.Thirumavalavan, PMK leader Ramadoss, May17 movement Thirumuruan Gandhi and various Tamil Media associations also demand his immediate release from Sri Lankan Army custody. On 28 December 2013, he was released and deported to India.,

=== Works ===
- Directed This Land Belongs to the Army, a documentary film. This film also exposes the Sri Lankan government's policy of Sinhalisation and system land grabbing of Sri Lankan forces. It also features new testimonies from Tamil genocide victims and an exclusive interview with a Sri Lankan Army officer, who confesses to the indiscriminate use of chemical and heavy weapons against the Tamils in 2009.
- Directed Manipur: The Land of Tears, a television documentary.
